= List of São Tomé and Príncipe–related topics =

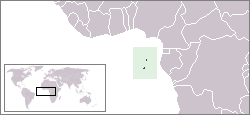

This is a partial list of topics related to São Tomé and Príncipe.

== Geography ==
- Extreme points of São Tomé and Príncipe
- List of volcanoes in São Tomé and Príncipe
- List of beaches of São Tomé and Príncipe

=== Landforms ===
==== Islands ====
- Ilheu Bom Bom
- Ilhéu das Cabras
- Ilhéu Caroço
- Ilhéu das Rolas
- Príncipe
- Rolas
- São Tomé Island
- Tinhosa Grande
- Tinhosa Pequena

==== Mountains ====
- Pico de São Tomé

=== Settlements ===
- Guadalupe, São Tomé and Príncipe
- Neves, São Tomé and Príncipe
- Santana, São Tomé and Príncipe
- Santo António
- São João dos Angolares
- São Tomé
- Trindade

== History ==
- Batepá massacre
- Elections in São Tomé and Príncipe
  - São Tomé and Príncipe legislative election, 1991
  - São Tomé and Príncipe legislative election, 1994
  - São Tomé and Príncipe legislative election, 1998
  - São Tomé and Príncipe legislative election, 2002
  - São Tomé and Príncipe legislative election, 2006
  - São Tomé and Príncipe presidential election, 1991
  - São Tomé and Príncipe presidential election, 1996
  - São Tomé and Príncipe presidential election, 2001
  - São Tomé and Príncipe presidential election, 2006
- List of colonial heads of São Tomé and Príncipe

== Government and politics ==
- Elections in São Tomé and Príncipe
- Human rights in São Tomé and Príncipe
- Military of São Tomé and Príncipe
- National Assembly of São Tomé and Príncipe

=== Administrative divisions ===
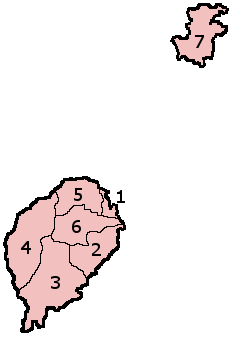
Six of São Tomé and Príncipe's seven districts are located on São Tomé Island.

- São Tomé (capital: São Tomé)
  - Água Grande District
  - Cantagalo District
  - Caué District
  - Lembá District
  - Lobata District
  - Mé-Zóchi District
- Autonomous Region of Príncipe (capital: Santo António)
  - Pagué District

=== Foreign relations ===
- Diplomatic missions of São Tomé and Príncipe
- List of diplomatic missions in São Tomé and Príncipe
- Nigeria–São Tomé and Príncipe Joint Development Authority
- São Tomé and Príncipe–United States relations

=== Political parties ===
- Christian Democratic Front
- Democratic Convergence Party-Reflection Group
- Democratic Renovation Party (São Tomé)
- Force for Change Democratic Movement-Liberal Party
- Independent Democratic Action
- Independent Democratic Union of São Tomé and Príncipe
- Movement for the Liberation of São Tomé and Príncipe/Social Democratic Party
- National Democratic Action of São Tomé and Príncipe
- National Resistance Front of São Tomé and Príncipe
- National Resistance Front of São Tomé and Príncipe-Renewal
- National Union for Democracy and Progress (São Tomé)
- New Way Movement
- Opposition Democratic Coalition
- People's Party of Progress
- Social Liberal Party (São Tomé)
- Social Renewal Party (São Tomé)
- São Toméan Workers Party
- Ue-Kedadji
- Union of Democrats for Citizenship and Development

=== Politicians ===
- List of heads of government of São Tomé and Príncipe
  - Leonel Mário d'Alva
  - Miguel Trovoada
  - Celestino Rocha da Costa
  - Daniel Daio
  - Norberto Costa Alegre
  - Evaristo Carvalho
  - Carlos Graça
  - Armindo Vaz d'Almeida
  - Raul Bragança Neto
  - Guilherme Posser da Costa
  - Gabriel Costa
  - Maria das Neves
  - Damião Vaz d'Almeida
  - Maria do Carmo Silveira
  - Tomé Vera Cruz
  - Patrice Trovoada
  - Joaquim Rafael Branco
- List of heads of state of São Tomé and Príncipe
  - Manuel Pinto da Costa
  - Miguel Trovoada
  - Manuel Quintas de Almeida
  - Fradique de Menezes
  - Fernando Pereira
- Ministers of the São Toméan Government
- List of Foreign Ministers of São Tomé and Príncipe
- List of presidents of the Regional Government of Príncipe

== Economy ==
- Cocoa production in São Tomé and Príncipe
- Mineral industry of São Tomé and Príncipe
- National Bank of São Tomé and Príncipe
- São Tomé and Príncipe dobra
- São Tomé and Príncipe escudo

=== Companies ===
==== Airlines ====
- Air São Tomé and Príncipe (defunct)
- STP Airways

==== Banks ====
- Afriland First Bank
- Banco Internacional de São Tomé e Príncipe
- National Bank of São Tomé and Príncipe

=== Trade unions ===
- General Union of the Workers of São Tomé and Príncipe
- National Organization of the Workers of São Tomé and Príncipe - Central Union

=== Communications ===
- .st (Internet country code top-level domain)
- RTP África

=== Transport ===
==== Airports ====
- Príncipe Airport
- São Tomé International Airport (Salazar Airport)

== Demographics ==
- List of people from São Tomé and Príncipe

=== Ethnic groups ===
- Beti-Pahuin
- Cape Verdean São Toméan

=== Languages ===
- Portuguese language (official language)
- Forro language
- Angolar language
- Principense language
- French language

=== Religion ===
- Islam in São Tomé and Príncipe
- Roman Catholic Diocese of São Tomé and Príncipe

== Culture ==
- Public holidays in São Tomé and Príncipe

=== Education ===
- University of São Tomé and Príncipe

=== National symbols ===
- Coat of arms of São Tomé and Príncipe
- Flag of São Tomé and Príncipe
- Independência total

=== Sport ===
- Estádio Nacional 12 de Julho

==== Football ====
- São Toméan Football Federation
- São Tomé and Príncipe national football team

===== Football clubs =====
- 1º de Maio
- 6 de Setembro
- Agrosport
- Andorinha Sport Club
- Bairros Unidos FC
- Caixão Grande (football club)
- Clube Desportivo de Guadalupe
- Desportivo Marítimo
- FC Porto Real
- Futebol Club Aliança Nacional
- GD Os Operários
- GD Sundy
- Grupo Desportivo Cruz Vermelha
- Desportivo de Guadalupe
- Inter Bom-Bom
- Os Dinâmicos
- Santana FC
- Sporting Praia Cruz
- UDESCAI
- UDRA
- União Desportiva Aeroporto, Picão e Belo Monte
- Vitória FC (Riboque)

===== Football competitions =====
- Principe Island League
- São Tomé Island League
- São Tomé and Principe Championship
- Taça Nacional de São Tomé e Principe

==== Olympics ====
- São Tomé and Príncipe at the 1996 Summer Olympics
- São Tomé and Príncipe at the 2000 Summer Olympics
- São Tomé and Príncipe at the 2004 Summer Olympics
- São Tomé and Príncipe at the 2008 Summer Olympics

== Environment ==
=== Wildlife ===
- List of mammals in São Tomé and Príncipe
- List of birds of São Tomé and Príncipe

== See also ==
- Lists of country-related topics
- List of lists of African country-related topics by country
