= Human rights in São Tomé and Príncipe =

The U.S. Department of State's Country Report on Human Rights Practices for São Tomé and Príncipe states that the government generally respects the human rights of its citizens, despite problems in a few areas.

São Tomé and Príncipe is one of 11 sub-Saharan African countries rated "free" in the 2006 Freedom in the World survey published annually by Freedom House, a pro-democracy organization that monitors political rights, civil liberties, and press freedom around the world. On a scale from 1 (most free) to 7 (least free), São Tomé received a 2 for both political rights and civil liberties.

== Political rights ==
From independence in 1975 until 1990, the country was a one-party state with restricted political rights. In 1990, citizens approved a constitution that established a multiparty democracy.

Since then, nine national elections in São Tomé and Príncipe have taken place: four elections for president (in 1991, 1996, 2001, and 2006) and five for the National Assembly (1991, 1994, 1998, 2002, and 2006). All of these elections were conducted to be generally free, fair, and transparent by domestic and international monitors.

Elections at the local level were conducted for the first time in 1992. Príncipe was granted autonomy in 1994 and elected a regional assembly and government in 1995.

== Civil liberties ==
Freedoms of assembly, association, movement, and religion are constitutionally guaranteed and generally respected by the government. Academic freedom is respected.

=== Press freedom ===
According to the U.S. State Department, "The law provides for freedom of speech and of the press, and the government generally respected these rights. It also notes that some journalists practice self-censorship."

Television and radio are state operated and there are no independent stations, due to economic and market constraints. There is no law prohibiting the establishment of such stations and all opposition parties have access to the state-run media, including a minimum of three minutes per month on television. Opposition newsletters and pamphlets criticizing the government circulate freely.

São Tomé's press is rated as 'free' by the Freedom House organization. In its 2006 Press Freedom Survey, São Tomé ranked 5th out of Sub-Saharan Africa's 48 countries in terms of press freedom – trailing only Mali, Mauritius, Ghana, and South Africa.

Freedom House describes the country's press freedom situation as follows: "The Constitution of São Tomé guarantees freedom of the press and the government has an exemplary history of respecting these rights in practice. Publications that criticize official policies circulate freely without journalists being arrested, jailed, tortured or harassed. However, journalists do practice a good degree of self-censorship, and often depend on official news releases for their reports which inhibits the growth of investigative journalism. Lack of advertising revenue, technology, media training and poor salaries also constitute major handicaps for journalists."

Other prominent press freedom organizations such as Reporters Without Borders (RSF), International Press Institute (IPI), and the Committee to Protect Journalists (CPJ) don't include São Tomé in their annual reports.

== Rule of law ==
Crime in São Tomé and Príncipe
- Homicide: 3.2 (2011)
- Assault: 2.2 (2011)
- Theft: 10.8 (2011)
- Rape: 1.6 (2011)
- Sexual violence: 0.0 (2011)
- reported per 100,000 inhabitants

=== Judiciary and judicial process ===
An independent judiciary, including a Supreme Court with members designated by, and responsible to, the National Assembly, was established by the 1990 referendum on multiparty rule. The Supreme Court has ruled against both the government and the president, but is occasionally subject to manipulation. The court system is overburdened, understaffed, inadequately funded, and plagued by long delays in hearing cases.

The law provides for the right to a fair public trial, the right of appeal, the right to legal representation, and, if indigent, the right to an attorney appointed by the state. Defendants are presumed innocent, have the right to confront witnesses, and to present evidence on their own behalf. However, inadequate resources resulted in lengthy pretrial detentions and greatly hindered investigations in criminal cases.

=== Conduct of security forces ===
There were no reports that the government or its agents committed arbitrary or unlawful killings, torture, or politically motivated disappearances.

=== Prison conditions ===
Prison conditions in the country are described as "harsh, but not life-threatening" in the state department's report. Facilities are reportedly overcrowded, and food was inadequate. Some pretrial prisoners were held with convicted prisoners.

The government permits human rights monitors to visit prisons.

=== Capital punishment ===
Capital punishment was abolished in São Tomé and Príncipe in 1990. São Tomé and Príncipe ratified the Second Optional Protocol to the International Covenant on Civil and Political Rights on January 10, 2017.

== Corruption ==
Official corruption is a serious problem. São Tomé and Príncipe was not surveyed in Transparency International's 2005 Corruption Perceptions Index.

== Societal discrimination ==
The law provides for the equality of all citizens regardless of sex, race, racial origin, political tendency, creed, or philosophic conviction, and while the government actively enforced these provisions, women faced discrimination. Domestic violence against women occurred, including rape, but the extent of the problem was unknown. Although women have the right to Legal recourse-–including against spouses–-many were reluctant to bring legal action or were ignorant of their rights under the law. Tradition inhibited women from taking domestic disputes outside the family.

The law stipulates that women and men have equal political, economic, and social rights. While many women have access to opportunities in education, business, and government, in practice women still encountered significant societal discrimination.

Mistreatment of children was not widespread; however, there were few protections for orphans and abandoned children. Child labor was a problem.

There were no reports of persons being trafficked to, from, or within the country.

== Worker rights ==
The rights to organize, strike, and bargain collectively are guaranteed and respected. Few unions exist, but independent cooperatives have taken advantage of the government land-distribution program to attract workers. Because of its role as the main employer in the wage sector, the government remains the key interlocutor for labor on all matters, including wages. Working conditions on many of the state-owned cocoa plantations are harsh.

== Historical situation ==
The following chart shows São Tomé and Príncipe's ratings since 1975 in the Freedom in the World reports, published annually by Freedom House. A rating of 1 is "free"; 7, "not free".^{1}

Historical ratings

Year	Political Rights	Civil Liberties	Status	President^{2}
1975	5	5	Partly Free	Manuel Pinto da Costa
1976	5	5	Partly Free	Manuel Pinto da Costa
1977	6	5	Not Free	Manuel Pinto da Costa
1978	6	6	Not Free	Manuel Pinto da Costa
1979	6	6	Not Free	Manuel Pinto da Costa
1980	6	6	Not Free	Manuel Pinto da Costa
1981	6	6	Not Free	Manuel Pinto da Costa
1982^{3}	6	6	Not Free	Manuel Pinto da Costa
1983	7	7	Not Free	Manuel Pinto da Costa
1984	7	7	Not Free	Manuel Pinto da Costa
1985	7	7	Not Free	Manuel Pinto da Costa
1986	7	7	Not Free	Manuel Pinto da Costa
1987	7	7	Not Free	Manuel Pinto da Costa
1988	6	7	Not Free	Manuel Pinto da Costa
1989	6	5	Not Free	Manuel Pinto da Costa
1990	5	5	Partly Free	Manuel Pinto da Costa
1991	2	3	Free	Miguel Trovoada
1992	2	3	Free	Miguel Trovoada
1993	1	2	Free	Miguel Trovoada
1994	1	2	Free	Miguel Trovoada
1995	1	2	Free	Miguel Trovoada
1996	1	2	Free	Miguel Trovoada
1997	1	2	Free	Miguel Trovoada
1998	1	2	Free	Miguel Trovoada
1999	1	2	Free	Miguel Trovoada
2000	1	2	Free	Miguel Trovoada
2001	1	2	Free	Fradique de Menezes
2002	1	2	Free	Fradique de Menezes
2003	2	2	Free	Fradique de Menezes
2004	2	2	Free	Fradique de Menezes
2005	2	2	Free	Fradique de Menezes
2006	2	2	Free	Fradique de Menezes
2007	2	2	Free	Fradique de Menezes
2008	2	2	Free	Fradique de Menezes
2009	2	2	Free	Fradique de Menezes
2010	2	2	Free	Fradique de Menezes
2011	2	2	Free	Manuel Pinto da Costa
2012	2	2	Free	Manuel Pinto da Costa
2013	2	2	Free	Manuel Pinto da Costa
2014	2	2	Free	Manuel Pinto da Costa
2015	2	2	Free	Manuel Pinto da Costa
2016	2	2	Free	Evaristo Carvalho
2017	2	2	Free	Evaristo Carvalho
2018	2	2	Free	Evaristo Carvalho
2019	2	2	Free	Evaristo Carvalho
2020	2	2	Free	Evaristo Carvalho
2021	2	2	Free	Carlos Vila Nova
2022	2	2	Free	Carlos Vila Nova
2023	2	2	Free	Carlos Vila Nova

== International treaties ==
São Tomé and Príncipe's stances on international human rights treaties are as follows:

International treaties

Treaty	Organization	Introduced	Signed	Ratified
Convention on the Prevention and Punishment of the Crime of Genocide	United Nations	1948	-	-
International Convention on the Elimination of All Forms of Racial Discrimination	United Nations	1966	2000	-
International Covenant on Economic, Social and Cultural Rights	United Nations	1966	1995	-
International Covenant on Civil and Political Rights	United Nations	1966	1995	-
First Optional Protocol to the International Covenant on Civil and Political Rights	United Nations	1966	2000	-
Convention on the Non-Applicability of Statutory Limitations to War Crimes and Crimes Against Humanity	United Nations	1968	-	-
International Convention on the Suppression and Punishment of the Crime of Apartheid	United Nations	1973	-	1979
Convention on the Elimination of All Forms of Discrimination against Women	United Nations	1979	1995	2003
Convention against Torture and Other Cruel, Inhuman or Degrading Treatment or Punishment	United Nations	1984	2000	-
Convention on the Rights of the Child	United Nations	1989	-	1991
Second Optional Protocol to the International Covenant on Civil and Political Rights, aiming at the abolition of the death penalty	United Nations	1989	2000	-
International Convention on the Protection of the Rights of All Migrant Workers and Members of Their Families	United Nations	1990	2000	-
Optional Protocol to the Convention on the Elimination of All Forms of Discrimination against Women	United Nations	1999	2000	-
Optional Protocol to the Convention on the Rights of the Child on the Involvement of Children in Armed Conflict	United Nations	2000	-	-
Optional Protocol to the Convention on the Rights of the Child on the Sale of Children, Child Prostitution and Child Pornography	United Nations	2000	-	-
Convention on the Rights of Persons with Disabilities	United Nations	2006	-	-
Optional Protocol to the Convention on the Rights of Persons with Disabilities	United Nations	2006	-	-
International Convention for the Protection of All Persons from Enforced Disappearance	United Nations	2006	-	-
Optional Protocol to the International Covenant on Economic, Social and Cultural Rights	United Nations	2008	-	-
Optional Protocol to the Convention on the Rights of the Child on a Communications Procedure	United Nations	2011	-	-

== See also ==
- LGBT rights in São Tomé and Príncipe
- Human rights in Africa

== Notes ==
1.Note that the "Year" signifies the "Year covered". Therefore, the information for the year marked 2008 is from the report published in 2009, and so on.
2.As of Independence on 12 July 1975, and 1 January for years thereafter.
3.The 1982 report covers the year 1981 and the first half of 1982, and the following 1984 report covers the second half of 1982 and the whole of 1983. In the interest of simplicity, these two aberrant "year and a half" reports have been split into three year-long reports through interpolation.
