= 2011 São Toméan presidential election =

- 17 July 2011 (first round); 7 August 2011 (second round)
- Registered: 92,689
- Turnout: 68.36% (first round), 74.09% (second round)
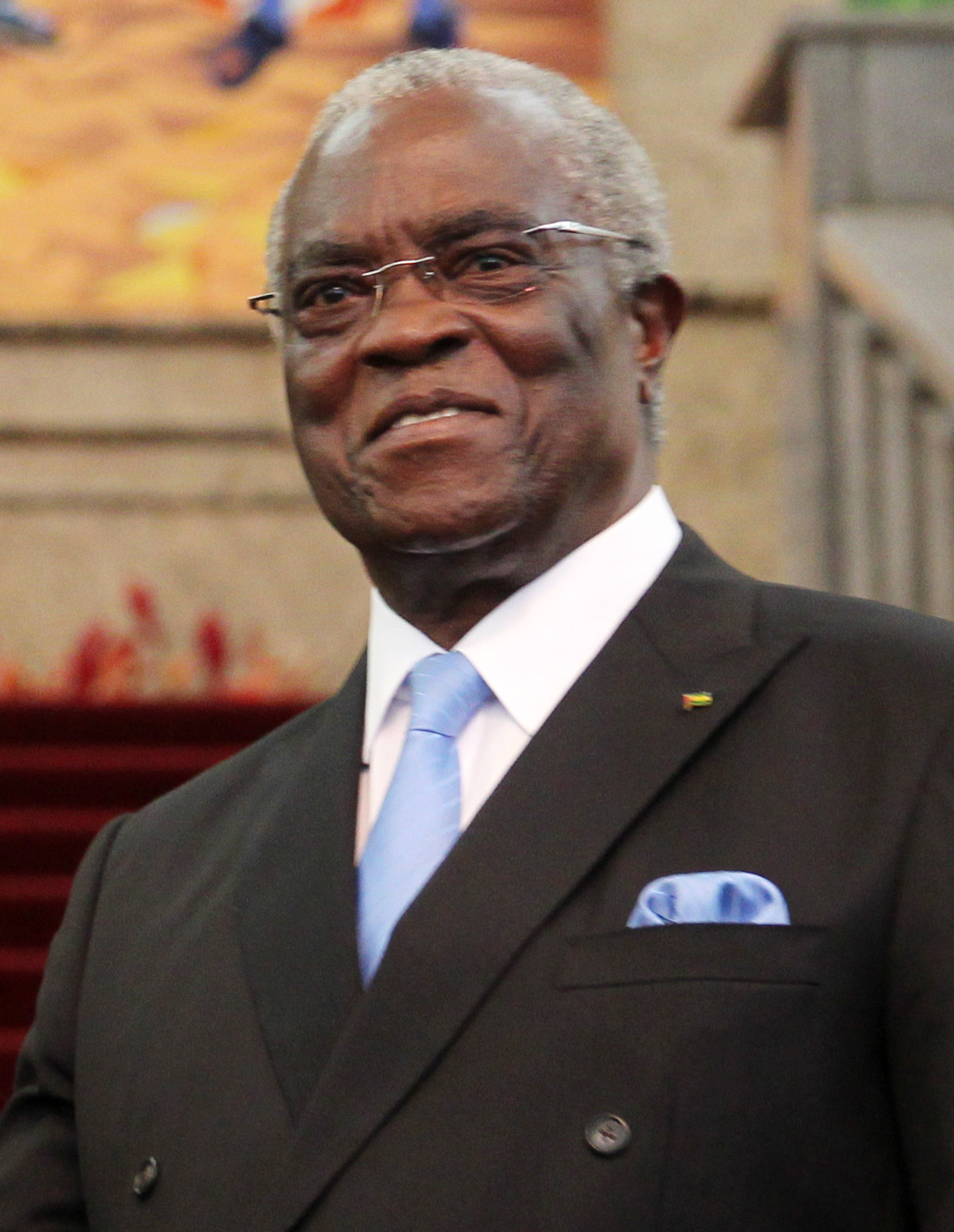

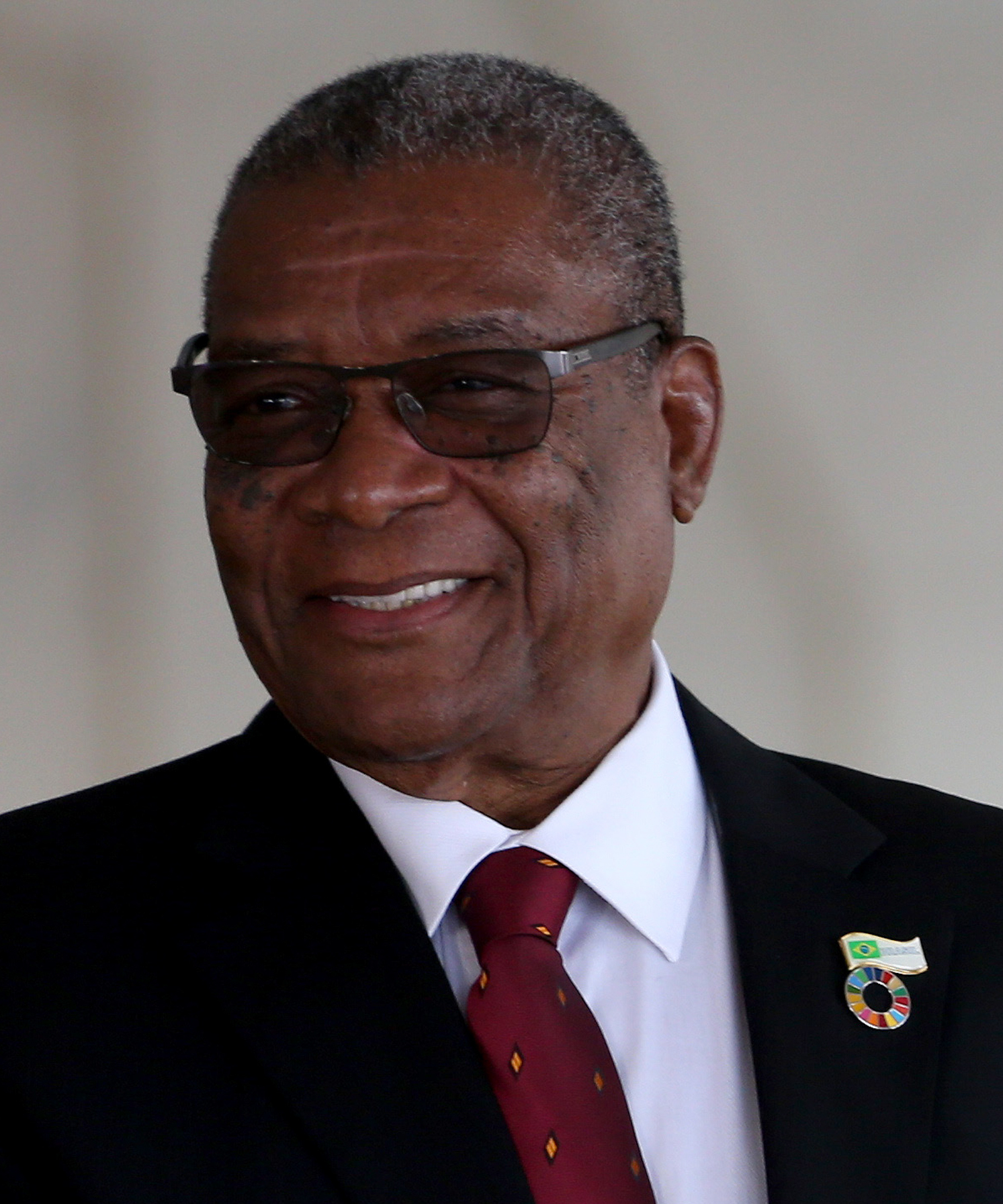
Nominee	Manuel Pinto da Costa	Evaristo Carvalho
Party	Independent	ADI
Popular vote	35,112	31,287
Percentage	52.88%	47.12%
President before election
Fradique de Menezes
MDFM – PL
Elected President
Manuel Pinto da Costa
Independent

Presidential elections were held in São Tomé and Príncipe in 2011, the first round beginning on 17 July 2011 with a run-off held on 7 August 2011. Incumbent President Fradique de Menezes had served the maximum two terms and could not constitutionally seek a third term. The final result saw former president Manuel Pinto da Costa, aged 74, elected in a narrow victory against Speaker of Parliament Evaristo Carvalho.

The first round was contested by approximately 120 candidates. The candidate from President de Menezes' party, Force for Change Democratic Movement–Liberal Party (Portuguese: Movimento Democrático das Forças de Mudança–Partido Liberal, MDFM–PL), was Delfim Neves, who jointly represented the MDFM–PL and his own Democratic Convergence Party (Portuguese: Partido de Convergencia Democratica, PCD–GR). Pinto da Costa, who ran independently, won the most votes but failed to receive the majority required to claim an outright victory. Carvalho, of the ruling party Independent Democratic Action (Portuguese: Acção Democratica Independente, ADI), a former prime minister and the incumbent Speaker of the National Assembly, placed second. A run-off to be contested between Pinto da Costa and Carvalho was announced on the same day. Pinto da Costa received the backing of the majority of eliminated candidates, and he was expected to win comfortably.

Pinto da Costa won the runoff, held 7 August, by five percentage points.

== Background ==
Manuel Pinto da Costa previously served as São Tomé and Príncipe's first president from independence in 1975. He governed the islands as a one-party socialist state under the Movement for the Liberation of São Tomé and Príncipe (Portuguese: Movimento de Libertação de São Tomé e Príncipe, MLSTP). In 1991, the legalisation of opposition political parties led to the country's first election under a democratic system. Pinto da Costa was not a candidate in that election and instead announced he would retire from politics. The MLSTP did not present an alternative candidate and Miguel Trovoada was elected unopposed. Despite his previous declaration, Pinto da Costa returned to participate in the presidential elections of 1996, but was narrowly defeated by Trovoada. In 2001, he ran against incumbent president Fradique de Menezes, and was again unsuccessful.

Pinto da Costa resigned from the MLSTP in 2005. The party is currently led by Aurélio Martins, who placed sixth in the first round vote count. Other major candidates included former prime minister Maria das Neves and former defence minister Elsa Pinto, both independents. Pinto da Costa's main rival, Carvalho, represented the ADI, which won the parliamentary elections in August 2010 and is the ruling party of incumbent Prime Minister Patrice Trovoada.

== Conduct ==
Missions from the African Union, Community of Portuguese Language Countries and the Economic Community of Central African States sent observers to monitor the election, which was declared free and fair. The only major controversy observed was a boycott by around 30,000 from five small villages on São Tomé's northern shore, in protest over grievances with living conditions that had not been addressed. The polls were re-opened in these villages on 20 July, but the results did not affect the outcome.

== Results ==
A total of 92,639 citizens were registered to vote. In the first round, the national electoral commission, headed by Victor Correia, recorded a turnout of 68%. Of the 120 candidates, Da Costa and Carvalho won the most votes (35.6% and 21.8% respectively), but neither candidate received enough support to claim a majority. Delfim Neves and Maria das Neves both won substantial vote counts (over 14% each), but only the first two placeholders went through to the run-off. After the results were confirmed, most of the eliminated candidates, including Delfim Neves, Maria das Neves and Aurélio Martins, endorsed da Costa's bid for the run-off.

Candidate	Party	First round		Second round	
Candidate	Party	Votes	%	Votes	%
Manuel Pinto da Costa	Independent	21,457	35.62	35,140	52.88
Evaristo Carvalho	Independent Democratic Action	13,125	21.79	31,308	47.12
Delfim Neves	PCD-GR – MDFM-PL	8,652	14.36		
Maria das Neves	Independent	8,461	14.04		
Elsa Pinto	Independent	2,682	4.45		
Aurélio Martins	MLSTP/PSD	2,445	4.06		
Filinto Costa Alegre	Independent	2,401	3.99		
Hélder Barros	Independent	414	0.69		
Jorge Coelho	Independent	401	0.67		
Manuel de Deus Lima	Independent	208	0.35		
Total		60,246	100.00	66,448	100.00
Valid votes		60,246	95.13	66,448	96.81
Invalid/blank votes		3,082	4.87	2,192	3.19
Total votes		63,328	100.00	68,640	100.00
Registered voters/turnout		92,639	68.36	92,639	74.09
Source: African Election Database

== Reactions ==
Several analysts have raised concerns that Pinto da Costa's victory may trigger a return to the authoritarian rule seen during his previous period in power.
