= 2010 São Toméan parliamentary election =

- 1 August 2010
- All 55 seats in the National Assembly; 28 seats needed for a majority
- Turnout: 89.01% (▲22.17pp)
Party	Leader	Vote %	Seats	+/–
ADI	Patrice Trovoada	43.13	26	+15
MLSTP–PSD	Joaquim Rafael Branco	32.81	21	+1
PCD-GR	José Luiz Xavier Mendes	13.91	7	
MDFM – PL	Tomé Vera Cruz	7.27	1	
This lists parties that won seats. See the complete results below.
Prime Minister before	Prime Minister after
Joaquim Rafael Branco; MLSTP–PSD	Patrice Trovoada; ADI

Parliamentary elections were held in São Tomé and Príncipe on 1 August 2010. The elections had been planned for 21 February, but were then postponed. President Fradique de Menezes announced on 17 March 2010 that elections would be held on 1 August 2010.

== Results ==
The opposition Independent Democratic Action emerged as the largest party, winning 26 of the 55 seats. Prime Minister Joaquim Rafael Branco's MLSTP-PSD came second with 21 seats. Third was PCD, a member of the ruling coalition, with seven seats. President de Menezes's MDFM-PL won only one seat.

Party	Votes	%	Seats	+/–
Independent Democratic Action	29,588	43.13	26	+15
MLSTP/PSD	22,510	32.81	21	+1
Democratic Convergence Party	9,540	13.91	7	–
Force for Change Democratic Movement – Liberal Party	4,986	7.27	1	–
Union of Democrats for Citizenship and Development	855	1.25	0	0
Christian Democratic Front	291	0.42	0	0
Socialist Movement	260	0.38	0	New
National Union for Democracy and Progress	242	0.35	0	New
National Democratic Confederation/Fêssu Bassóla	204	0.30	0	New
Opposition Democratic Coalition	129	0.19	0	New
Total	68,605	100.00	55	0
Valid votes	68,605	97.82		
Invalid/blank votes	1,531	2.18		
Total votes	70,136	100.00		
Registered voters/turnout	78,798	89.01		
Source: African Election Database
