= 1994 São Toméan parliamentary election =

- 2 October 1994
- All 55 seats in the National Assembly; 28 seats needed for a majority
- Turnout: 52.09% (▼24.65pp)
Party	Leader	Vote %	Seats	+/–
MLSTP–PSD	Carlos Graça	42.53	27	+6
ADI	Carlos Neves (Note: The party was strongly associated with President Miguel Trovoada)	26.27	14	New
PCD-GR	Leonel Mário d'Alva	24.59	14	−19
This lists parties that won seats. See the complete results below.
Results by district
Prime Minister before	Prime Minister after
Evaristo Carvalho; ADI	Carlos Graça; MLSTP–PSD

Parliamentary elections were held in São Tomé and Príncipe on 2 October 1994. The result was a victory for the opposition Movement for the Liberation of São Tomé and Príncipe - Social Democratic Party (MLSTP/PSD), which won 27 of the 55 seats in the National Assembly. Voter turnout was only 52.1%. Following the elections Carlos Graça was appointed Prime Minister of a coalition government formed by the MLSTP/PSD and the Democratic Convergence Party (PCD-GR).

== Background ==
In early 1994 relations between the government and the presidency again began to deteriorate. In April Trovoada publicly dissociated himself from government policy. In June political tension increased when the Democratic Convergence Party accused Trovoada of systematic obstruction of the government's programme. The same month opposition parties petitioned the president to dismiss the government and to appoint foreign auditors to investigate the management of public funds under its term of office.

On 2 July 1994 Trovoada dismissed the government of Prime Minister Norberto d'Alva Costa Alegre citing 'institutional conflict' as the justification for the decision. Moreover, the president accused the ruling party of ignoring presidential vetoes and of attempting to replace the semi-presidential system with a parliamentary regime without executive powers for the head of state. On 4 July Trovoada appointed Evaristo do Espirito Santo de Carvalho (the minister of defence and security in the outgoing administration) as prime minister. The PCD-GR, which refused to participate in the new government, subsequently expelled Carvalho from the party. An interim administration, comprising eight ministers, took office on 9 July. On the following day, in an attempt to resolve the political crisis, Trovoada dissolved the national assembly and announced that parliamentary elections would be held on 2 October.

== Results ==
Party	Votes	%	Seats	+/–
MLSTP/PSD	10,782	42.53	27	+6
Independent Democratic Action	6,660	26.27	14	New
Democratic Convergence Party	6,235	24.59	14	–19
Opposition Democratic Coalition	1,152	4.54	0	–1
People's Alliance	342	1.35	0	New
Christian Democratic Front	181	0.71	0	0
Total	25,352	100.00	55	0
Valid votes	25,352	87.12		
Invalid/blank votes	3,748	12.88		
Total votes	29,100	100.00		
Registered voters/turnout	55,862	52.09		
Source: Nohlen et al.
