= Carlos Vila Nova =

President of São Tomé and Príncipe since 2021

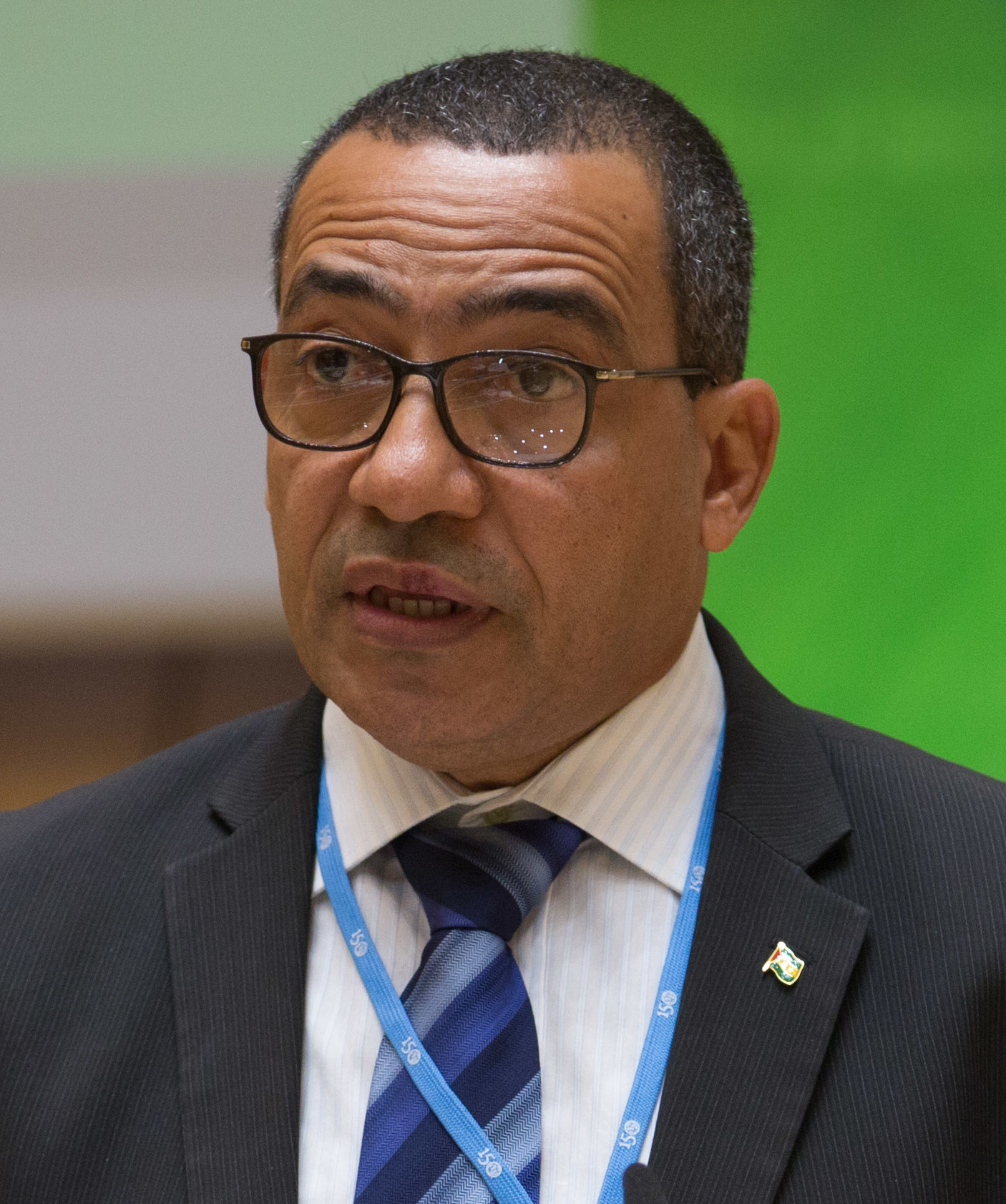
- Vila Nova in 2015

5th President of São Tomé and Príncipe
- Incumbent
- Assumed office 2 October 2021
- Prime Minister: Jorge Bom Jesus; Patrice Trovoada; Ilza Amado Vaz; Américo Ramos
- Preceded by: Evaristo Carvalho

Minister of Infrastructure, Natural Resources and the Environment
- In office 25 November 2014 – 3 December 2018
- President: Manuel Pinto da Costa; Evaristo Carvalho
- Preceded by: Fernando da Silva Maquengo de Freitas
- Succeeded by: Osvaldo Abreu

Minister of Public Works and Natural Resources
- In office 15 August 2010 – 12 December 2012
- President: Fradique de Menezes; Manuel Pinto da Costa

Member of the National Assembly
- Incumbent
- Assumed office 22 November 2018
- Constituency: Água Grande

Personal details
- Born: Carlos Manuel Vila Nova; 27 July 1959 (age 67) Neves, São Tomé and Príncipe, Portugal
- Party: Independent (since 2026)
- Other political affiliations: ADI (until 2026)
- Spouse: Fátima Vila Nova
- Children: 2

Carlos Manuel Vila Nova (born 27 July 1959) is a Santomean politician who is the fifth and current president of São Tomé and Príncipe, since 2 October 2021. He served as the Minister of Public Works and Natural Resources (2010–2012) and minister of Infrastructure, Natural Resources and the Environment (2014–2018) in successive governments of Prime Minister Patrice Trovoada.

== Early life and education ==
Vila Nova was born in Neves, a city in the Lembá District on the northern coast of São Tomé Island. He received a degree in telecommunications engineering from the University of Oran, Algeria in 1985, and later returned to become the head of the computer department of the government Statistics Directorate.

== Career ==
In 1988, he left the civil service to become a sales manager at Hotel Miramar, which was then the only hotel in the country. He was promoted to Director of Hotel Miramar in 1992. In 1997, he became Director of Hotel Pousada Boa Vista, and founded his own travel agency Mistral Voyages. Vila Nova remained in the tourism industry until he entered politics in 2010.

Vila Nova served as Minister of Public Works and Natural Resources in the cabinet of Patrice Trovoada from 2010 until the government lost its majority in 2012. He was appointed Minister of Infrastructure, Natural Resources and the Environment when Trovoada's Independent Democratic Action (ADI) regained its parliamentary majority in 2014. In 2018, Vila Nova was elected to the National Assembly.

== Presidency ==
He was the Independent Democratic Action (ADI) candidate in the 2021 presidential election. On 6 September, he was declared president-elect of São Tomé and Príncipe, after receiving 58% of the vote and defeating Guilherme Posser da Costa of the MLSTP/PSD. On 14 September, he was declared president by the Tribunal constitutional court.

On 6 January 2025, he dismissed Prime Minister Patrice Trovoada and his government, citing Trovoada's prolonged absences and his government's failure to solve multiple issues. Trovoada responded by calling his dismissal "illegal" and "unconstitutional". He then selected then Minister of Justice, Ilza Amado Vaz, as prime minister. Vaz then resigned, stating in a letter that her continued leadership "would not contribute to the success of public policies and the harmonious and peaceful development." He thereafter picked Américo Ramos, who was not endorsed for the prime ministerial role by the ADI, being criticized for ignoring the majority of the National Assembly.

Vila Nova was reelected president in the 2026 São Toméan presidential election on 19 July, winning 55.94% of the vote in the first round as an independent candidate with support from MLSTP–PSD against Nito Abreu, who was supported by ADI and garnered 41.42%. The turnout reached a record low of 41%.

=== Policies ===
In March 2026, Vila Nova, together with Prime Minister Américo Ramos and the international business group Aequatoris, announced the planned creation of the São Tomé Financial Centre, a major economic reform that intended to establish a free zone aimed at attracting international service companies to the country.

== Personal life ==
Vila Nova is married to Maria de Fátima Afonso Vila Nova and has two daughters.

== Honours ==
- Cape Verde:
  - 1st Class of the Amílcar Cabral Order – 2023
- Equatorial Guinea:
  - Grand Cross of the Order of Independence – 2024
- Portugal:
  - Grand Collar of the Order of Prince Henry – 2022

== See also ==
- List of current heads of state and government
- List of heads of the executive by approval rating
