= 1998 São Toméan parliamentary election =

- 8 November 1998
- All 55 seats in the National Assembly; 28 seats needed for a majority
- Turnout: 64.68% (▲12.59pp)
Party	Leader	Vote %	Seats	+/–
MLSTP–PSD	Manuel Pinto da Costa	50.61	31	+4
ADI	Carlos Neves (Note: The party was strongly associated with President Miguel Trovoada)	28.19	16	+2
PCD-GR	Alda Bandeira	15.99	8	−6
This lists parties that won seats. See the complete results below.
Results by district
Prime Minister before	Prime Minister after
Raúl Bragança Neto; MLSTP–PSD	Guilherme Posser da Costa; MLSTP–PSD

Parliamentary elections were held in São Tomé and Príncipe on 8 November 1998. The result was a victory for the Movement for the Liberation of São Tomé and Príncipe-Social Democratic Party, which won 31 of the 55 seats in the National Assembly. Voter Turnout was 64.5%.

== Background ==
The 1998 National Assembly elections were originally scheduled for late September/early October as impressive progress on voter registration was made. On 1 September, however, President Miguel Trovoada issued a decree setting the polling date at 8 November.

Nine political parties competed for the 55 seats at stake. These included the three represented in the outgoing parliament: the Movement for the Liberation of São Tomé and Príncipe (MLSTP-PSD), the Democratic Convergence Party (PCD) and the Independent Democratic Action (ADI). Since the previous elections in 1994, the first two groups had governed in a coalition, led since November 1996 by Prime Minister Raul Bragança Neto. ADI, for its part, supported the policies of President Trovoada.

The election campaign lasted from 22 October to 6 November. Issues debated centered on the exploitation of offshore oil reserves and the country's entry into the monetary Franc zone. Mr. Bragança (MLSTP) stated that his party had improved economic conditions and brought political stability to Sao Tome, which had seen a succession of governments in the 1990s. Led by Alda Bandeira, the PCD called for continued coalition rule to ensure such stability.

Polling day was monitored by international observers. Final results gave an absolute majority (31 seats) to the left-leaning MLSTP-PSD, which had fallen short of this edge by only one seat in 1994. In this context, ADI alleged irregularities in the voting procedure. The victors promptly announced that their priority would be to reorganize the economy and thus alleviate the widespread poverty plaguing the nation.

On 30 December, President Trovoada appointed former Foreign Minister Guilherme Posser da Costa (MLSTP) as Prime Minister; he and the new Cabinet were sworn in on 5 January 1999.

== Results ==
Party	Votes	%	Seats	+/–
MLSTP–PSD	14,771	50.61	31	+4
Independent Democratic Action	8,227	28.19	16	+2
Democratic Convergence Party–Reflection Group	4,667	15.99	8	–6
Opposition Democratic Coalition	483	1.65	0	0
National Union for Democracy and Progress	363	1.24	0	New
People's Party of Progress	334	1.14	0	New
People's Alliance	184	0.63	0	0
Christian Democratic Front	156	0.53	0	0
Total	29,185	100.00	55	0
Valid votes	29,185	90.90		
Invalid/blank votes	2,923	9.10		
Total votes	32,108	100.00		
Registered voters/turnout	49,639	64.68		
Source: African Elections Database, Economist Intelligence Unit

=== By district ===
District	MLSTP-PSD	PCD-GR	ADI
Água Grande	8	2	3
Cantagalo	3	2	2
Caué	3	1	1
Lembá	4	0	2
Lobata	4	0	2
Mé-Zóchi	6	2	5
Pagué	3	1	1
Total	31	8	16
