= Trovoada =

Trovoada is a surname. Notable people with the surname include:

- Miguel Trovoada (born 1936), São Toméan politician
- Patrice Trovoada (born 1962), São Toméan politician
