= 1985 São Toméan parliamentary election =

- 30 September 1985
- All 51 seats in the National People's Assembly
Party	Leader	Seats	+/–
MLSTP	Manuel Pinto da Costa	51	+11
This lists parties that won seats. See the complete results below.

Parliamentary elections were held in São Tomé and Príncipe on 30 September 1985. The country was a one-party state at the time, with the Movement for the Liberation of São Tomé and Príncipe as the sole legal party. It therefore won all 51 seats in the National People's Assembly. Members of the Assembly were elected by the People's District Assemblies, which had been directly elected between 16 and 20 August.
