= 1980 São Toméan parliamentary election =

- 14 May 1980
- All 40 seats in the National People's Assembly
Party	Leader	Seats
MLSTP	Manuel Pinto da Costa	40
This lists parties that won seats. See the complete results below.

Parliamentary elections were held in São Tomé and Príncipe on 14 May 1980. The country was a one-party state at the time, with the Movement for the Liberation of São Tomé and Príncipe as the sole legal party. It therefore won all 40 seats in the National Assembly.
