= List of prime ministers of São Tomé and Príncipe =

Prime Minister of the Democratic Republic of São Tomé and Príncipe
- Primeiro-ministro da República Democrática de São Tomé e Príncipe
- Coat of arms of São Tomé and Príncipe

- Incumbent; Américo Ramos since 12 January 2025
- Type: Head of government
- Member of: Council of Ministers; National Assembly
- Appointer: President of São Tomé and Príncipe
- Precursor: Governor of Portuguese São Tomé and Príncipe
- Formation: 12 July 1975; 51 years ago
- First holder: Miguel Trovoada
- Salary: Db 43,818,893 annually

This article lists the prime ministers of São Tomé and Príncipe, an island country in the Gulf of Guinea off the western equatorial coast of Central Africa, since the establishment of the office of prime minister of Portuguese São Tomé and Príncipe in 1974. Leonel Mário d'Alva was the first person to hold the office, taking effect on 21 December 1974. The incumbent is Américo Ramos, having taken office on 12 January 2025.

== List of officeholders ==
Political parties

Movement for the Liberation of São Tomé and Príncipe – Social Democratic Party (MLSTP–PSD)
Democratic Convergence Party (PCD)
Independent Democratic Action (ADI)
Force for Change Democratic Movement – Liberal Party (MDFM–PL)
Union of Democrats for Citizenship and Development (UDD)

=== Prime minister of Portuguese São Tomé and Príncipe (1974–1975) ===
No.	Portrait	Name (Birth–Death)	Term of office			Political party	Elected	Government(s)	Ref.
No.	Portrait	Name (Birth–Death)	Took office	Left office	Time in office	Political party	Elected	Government(s)	Ref.
1		Leonel Mário d'Alva (born 1935)	21 December 1974	12 July 1975	203 days	MLSTP–PSD	—		

=== Prime ministers of São Tomé and Príncipe (1975–present) ===
No.	Portrait	Name (Birth–Death)	Term of office			Political party	Elected	Government(s)	Ref.
No.	Portrait	Name (Birth–Death)	Took office	Left office	Time in office	Political party	Elected	Government(s)	Ref.
1		Miguel Trovoada (born 1936)	12 July 1975	9 April 1979	3 years, 271 days	MLSTP–PSD	1975		
Post abolished (9 April 1979 – 8 January 1988)
2		Celestino Rocha da Costa (1938–2010)	8 January 1988	7 February 1991	3 years, 30 days	MLSTP–PSD	—		
3		Daniel Daio (born 1947)	7 February 1991	16 May 1992	1 year, 99 days	PCD	1991		
4		Norberto Costa Alegre (born 1951)	16 May 1992	2 July 1994	2 years, 47 days	PCD	—		
5		Evaristo Carvalho (1941–2022)	7 July 1994	25 October 1994	110 days	ADI	—		
6		Carlos Graça (1931–2013) (Note: Briefly deposed in the 1995 coup attempt)	25 October 1994	31 December 1995	1 year, 67 days	MLSTP–PSD	1994		
7		Armindo Vaz d'Almeida (1953–2016)	31 December 1995	19 November 1996	324 days	MLSTP–PSD	—		
8		Raúl Bragança Neto (1946–2014)	19 November 1996	5 January 1999	2 years, 47 days	MLSTP–PSD	—		
9		Guilherme Posser da Costa (born 1953)	5 January 1999	26 September 2001	2 years, 264 days	MLSTP–PSD	1998		
(5)		Evaristo Carvalho (1941–2022)	26 September 2001	28 March 2002	183 days	ADI	—		
10		Gabriel Costa (born 1954)	28 March 2002	7 October 2002	193 days	ADI	2002		
11		Maria das Neves (born 1958) (Note: Briefly deposed in the 2003 coup attempt)	7 October 2002	18 September 2004	1 year, 347 days	MLSTP–PSD	—		
12		Damião Vaz d'Almeida (born 1951)	18 September 2004	8 June 2005	263 days	MLSTP–PSD	—		
13		Maria do Carmo Silveira (born 1959)	8 June 2005	21 April 2006	317 days	MLSTP–PSD	—		
14		Tomé Vera Cruz (born 1957)	21 April 2006	14 February 2008	1 year, 299 days	MDFM–PL	2006	XI	
15		Patrice Trovoada (born 1962)	14 February 2008	22 June 2008	129 days	ADI	—	XII	
16		Joaquim Rafael Branco (born 1953)	22 June 2008	14 August 2010	2 years, 53 days	MLSTP–PSD	—	XIII	
(15)		Patrice Trovoada (born 1962)	14 August 2010	12 December 2012	2 years, 120 days	ADI	2010	XIV	
(10)		Gabriel Costa (born 1954)	12 December 2012	25 December 2014	1 year, 348 days	UDD	—	XV	
(15)		Patrice Trovoada (born 1962)	25 December 2014	3 December 2018	4 years, 8 days	ADI	2014	XVI	
17		Jorge Bom Jesus (born 1962)	3 December 2018	10 November 2022	3 years, 342 days	MLSTP–PSD	2018	XVII	
(15)		Patrice Trovoada (born 1962)	11 November 2022	6 January 2025	2 years, 56 days	ADI	2022	XVIII	
18		Ilza Amado Vaz (born ?)	9 January 2025	12 January 2025	3 days	ADI	—	Proposed	
19		Américo Ramos (born 1957)	12 January 2025	Incumbent	1 year, 314 days	ADI	—	XIX	

== See also ==
- List of governors of Portuguese São Tomé and Príncipe
- List of presidents of the Regional Government of Príncipe
- List of presidents of São Tomé and Príncipe
- Ministry of Foreign Affairs, Cooperation and Communities
- Politics of São Tomé and Príncipe
