= 1991 São Toméan presidential election =

3 March 1991	1996 →
- Registered: 52,618
- Turnout: 61.81%
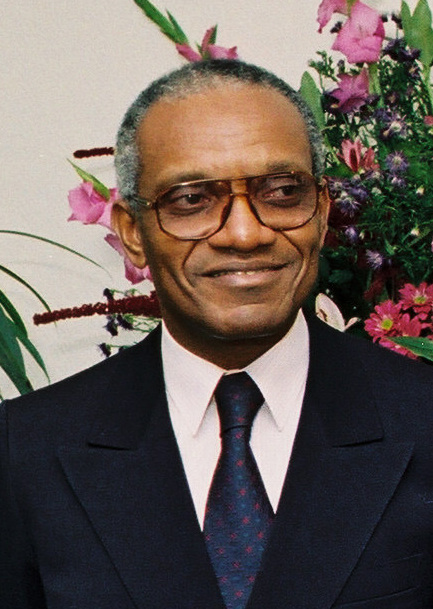
Candidate	Miguel Trovoada
Party	Independent (PCD-GR – CODO)
Popular vote	26,604
Percentage	100%
- Results by region (percentage of valid votes)
President before election
Manuel Quintas de Almeida (acting)
Movement for the Liberation of São Tomé and Príncipe
Elected President
Miguel Trovoada
Independent

Presidential elections were held for the first time in São Tomé and Príncipe on 3 March 1991, as previously the President had been elected by the National Assembly. Ultimately only one candidate, Miguel Trovoada, ran for office, and was elected unopposed. The MLSTP-PSD had called for voters to boycott the election.

Trovoada was sworn in as the second president of São Tomé and Príncipe on 3 April.

== Candidates ==
Three candidates stated their intention to participate in the contest; Miguel Trovoada, a former Prime Minister running as an independent (with the support of both the PCD-GR and CODO), Monso dos Santos of the Christian Democratic Front (FDC) and Guadalupe de Ceita, an independent candidate. Manuel Pinto da Costa, President since independence in 1975, declared that he would not be contesting the election and that he would retire from politics. The MLSTP-PSD did not present an alternative candidate.

In February, less than a month before the election, both Monso dos Santos and Guadalupe de Ceita withdrew from the elections, leaving Trovoada as the sole candidate.

== Results ==
Candidate	Party	Votes	%
Miguel Trovoada	Independent	26,604	100.00
Total		26,604	100.00
Valid votes		26,604	81.80
Invalid/blank votes		5,919	18.20
Total votes		32,523	100.00
Registered voters/turnout		52,618	61.81
Source: Nohlen et al.
