= Fátima Vila Nova =

Santomean activist

First Lady of São Tomé and Príncipe
- Current
- Assumed role 2 October 2021
- President: Carlos Vila Nova

Personal details
- Born: Maria de Fátima Afonso Vila Nova
- Spouse: Carlos Vila Nova
- Children: 2

Maria de Fátima Afonso Vila Nova is a Santomean activist known for her work in humanitarian issues, education, and women's rights. who has served as the First Lady of São Tomé and Príncipe since 2 October 2021 as the wife of President Carlos Vila Nova.

On 26 October 2021 Vila Nova held her first public event since assuming the role of first lady. Vila Nova met with a group of women, including a representative of the United Nations, to discuss issues related to climate change and São Tomé and Príncipe's contributions to the forthcoming 2021 United Nations Climate Change Conference (COP26) in Glasgow.

First Lady Vila Nova was awarded the Grand Cross of Humanitarian Merit (Gran Cruz de Mérito Humanitario) from the Institución del Mérito Humanitario for her work on humanitarian and social causes. The award ceremony took place in Barcelona, Spain, on 24 May 2025.
