= 1991 São Toméan parliamentary election =

- 20 January 1991
- All 55 seats in the National Assembly; 28 seats needed for a majority
- Turnout: 76.74%
Party	Leader	Vote %	Seats	+/–
PCD-GR	Leonel Mário d'Alva	59.33	33	New
MLSTP–PSD	Carlos Graça	33.31	21	−30
CODO		5.71	1	New
This lists parties that won seats. See the complete results below.
Results by district
Prime Minister before	Prime Minister after
Celestino Rocha da Costa; MLSTP–PSD	Daniel Daio; PCD-GR

Parliamentary elections were held in São Tomé and Príncipe on 20 January 1991. They were the first multi-party elections for the National Assembly, following a referendum the previous year. The result was a victory for the Democratic Convergence Party-Reflection Group, which won 33 of the 55 seats, defeating the former sole legal party, the Movement for the Liberation of São Tomé and Príncipe - Social Democratic Party. Voter turnout was 76.7%.

== Background and outcome of elections ==
The main political parties in the election were the Movement for the Liberation of São Tomé and Príncipe - Social Democratic Party (MLSTP-PSD), the former sole legal party and the Democratic Convergence Party - Reflection Group (PCD-GR), a party formed by a coalition of MLSTP dissidents, independents, and young professionals. Some of the smaller parties that participated in the election were the FDC, or Christian Democratic Front and the Democratic Coalition of the Opposition (CODO), created by the merger of three former overseas opposition movements.

The elections, deemed transparent, free, and fair resulted in victory for the PCD-GR, with the MLSTP defeat blamed on the country's economic problems. A transitional government headed by Daniel Daio was installed in February pending presidential elections to be held in March.

== Results ==
Party	Votes	%	Seats	+/–
Democratic Convergence Party	21,535	59.33	33	New
MLSTP/PSD	12,090	33.31	21	–30
Opposition Democratic Coalition	2,071	5.71	1	New
Christian Democratic Front	598	1.65	0	New
Total	36,294	100.00	55	+4
Valid votes	36,294	91.64		
Invalid/blank votes	3,311	8.36		
Total votes	39,605	100.00		
Registered voters/turnout	51,610	76.74		
Source: Romana
