= Human rights in Africa =

Contributing to the establishment of human rights system in Africa are the United Nations, international law and the African Union which have positively influenced the betterment the human rights situation in the continent. However, extensive human rights abuses still occur in many sections of the continent. Many of the provisions contained in regional, national, continental, and global agreements remained unaccomplished.

== Human rights assessment ==
A July 2017 United Nations Economic Commission for Africa report argues that the CFTA may contribute to tackling poverty and inequality as its wide scope will facilitate structural changes in African economies. It is seen as a step towards meeting the African Union's Agenda 2063 and the Sustainable Development Goals. The document was targeted to ensuring human rights were considered within the negotiations.

According to the Food and Agriculture Organization, recognizing the intersections of gender, agriculture, and trade, it is critical to ensure that the implementation of the AfCFTA addresses the nuanced and varied challenges that women face. It is vital that the operationalization of the AfCFTA agreement ensures that future trade policies, practices, and regulations promote gender equality and the empowerment of women and girls on the African continent, especially in supporting women to seize the new opportunities created ‘in agriculture’ by the AfCFTA. Implementation of the agreement that is not inclusive of women could result in a widening gender gap by negatively affecting women-led micro, small, or medium-sized enterprises and those who rely on informal trade (including cross border) for their livelihoods.

== African human rights system ==
The African Charter is a human rights document made up of 68 articles carved up into four sections—Human and Peoples' Rights; Duties; Procedure of the Commission; and Applicable Principles. It merges the three clusters of rights, namely, civil and political rights, economic, social, and cultural rights, and group and peoples' rights. It enforces obligations on individual members of each African society and connects the ideas of human rights, peoples' rights, and duties on people.

The organ commissioned to interpret the Charter, as well as investigate individual complaints is the African Commission on Human and People's Rights (ACHPR). The ACHPR was established based on Art. 30 of the Charter and was inaugurated in November 1987. The ACHPR meets two times a year and its secretariat is headquartered in Banjul (Gambia).

== Human rights education ==
Human rights are "rights one has simply because one is a human being." These privileges and civil liberties are innate in every person without prejudice and where ethnicity, place of abode, gender, cultural origin, skin color, religious affiliation, or language including sexual orientation do not matter. It basically refers to "all learning that develops the knowledge, skills, and values of human rights."

Human rights education covers an extensive array of ideals and standards that include peace, justice and tolerance, egalitarianism, diplomacy, and value for human dignity. By upholding recognition of and advancing respect for human rights in all civilizations, it allows learners to dynamically contribute in putting together a sustainable and a non-violent future.

According to Amnesty International, human rights education is a purposeful, participatory practice intended to empower people and communities by nurturing the love for knowledge, encourage the acquisition of skills, and development of attitudes and mindset aligned with globally accepted standards. It aspires to put together a culture of respect for prompt action in the protection and encouragement of human rights for all citizens.

In law enforcement, human rights education aims to elevate learners' consciousness and understanding of rights agreements in order to guarantee the safeguarding of people's rights in a community, transparency in government dealings and activities, liability/responsibility in civic transactions, and the balanced and impartial employment of force.

In most cases, human rights education manifests through popular education or community education with the purpose of organizing people and activating constituencies in the expansion and intensification of social movements. These community-based models have been created and established in rustic areas of Latin America, Asia, and Africa.

Such human rights education efforts are seen as both a political and an academic approach to assist democratic processes and achieve dynamic citizenship. Given focus in these education efforts are civil, political, social, economic, and cultural rights and a combination of equality rights for certain type of groups. As a result, human rights education differs in substance, method and strategy, extent, concentration, profundity, and accessibility.

== African women's rights ==
Significant improvements have been made toward the development of African women's rights and female political involvement at the international, national and local levels. The continent has espoused a number of lawful mechanisms, like the Maputo Protocol, declarations, such as the African Union Solemn Declaration on Gender Equality in Africa, and resolutions aimed to guarantee women's rights. These instruments likewise created numerous monitoring entities to ensure the fulfillment of African women's ideals. However, African women have continuously been confronted with absurd challenges in the sphere of economics, in their social lives, and in their positions within the community, specifically when it comes to healthcare and education. Sufficient healthcare, contraception awareness, and understanding of safe abortion is deficient because of the continent's derisory health infrastructure, making it tough for women to have satisfactory access to health clinics. Moreover, African women incessantly tail behind African men in their facility to have access, use, and control of land and other resources, which make them defenseless in states of conflict and unprotected in times of calamities.

The Maputo Protocol fixes the values for women's human rights in Africa. The protocol has one of the highest number of ratification for an instrument in the African Union. In this treaty, the description of violence against women distinguishes both physical and emotional aggression as well as threats of cruelty and sadism. It identifies the role of women in political and public life while persuading state parties to allocate more in time and money for legislation and other procedures that could secure equal representation of women and men in decision-making.

The protocol provides for the legal ban on female genital mutilation as well as the consent to abortion in cases of rape, incest, sexual mauling, and the continued pregnancy that threatens the mental and physical health/life of the mother or the fetus. It is also the first international human rights agreement that unequivocally talks about HIV/AIDS. Other provisions contained in the protocol address established but destructive practices, child marriage, polygamy, inheritance, economic empowerment, women's political participation, education, and women in armed conflict.

== African children's rights ==
Different types of violence and maltreatment wreak havoc on the lives of numerous children in Africa. These include economic and sexual abuse, gender bias in education, and being caught in the crossfire during armed conflicts. According to UNICEF, there are approximately 150 million children in the 5-14 age range who are engaged in hard labor and adult work.

Created to defend children and safeguard their innate rights, the African Charter on the Rights and Welfare of the Child (ACRWC) was created. It also serves as the major legal instrument within the African human rights system that clarifies the rights and privileges that African nations must guarantee to their children. Other concerns that African states want the charter to address include issues confronting children living under apartheid, child marriage, female genital mutilation (FGM), internal conflicts and displacement, rights of children whose mothers have been incarcerated, unsanitary living conditions, and the role of the family in adoption and fostering.

=== Child soldiers ===
==== Definition ====
According to the Paris Principles and Guidelines on Children Associated with Armed Forces or Armed Groups, a child soldier is a "any person below 18 years of age who has been recruited or used by an armed force or armed group in any capacity, including but not limited to children, boys, and girls used as fighters, cooks, porters, messengers, spies or for sexual purposes." Child soldiers are often compulsorily drafted by use of force, by kidnapping them or by issuing grave threats to them. Others willingly sign up to avoid extreme hardships and poverty.

One of the biggest reasons for employing child soldiers is that they are viewed as dispensable, or "throwaways" and maintaining them does not cost much. They are also seen as more susceptible compared to adults, who already have more defined personalities. Since children lack a sense of apprehension, they accept more hazardous errands without analyzing what they are getting into.

== Organizations safeguarding African human rights ==
There are nine international organizations working for the protection of African human rights, namely, Human Rights Watch, International Committee of the Red Cross, Global Rights, Amnesty International, International Federation for Human Rights, Refugees International, UN Watch, Human Rights Foundation, and Protection International.

== Human rights situation by country ==
=== North Africa ===
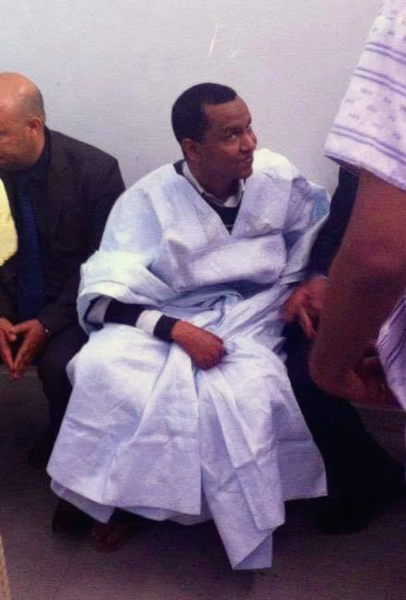
Mauritanian blogger Mohamed Mkhaïtir was sentenced to death after he wrote an article critical of religion and the caste system in Mauritania.

In Algeria, major human rights issues include unauthorized intrusion of privacy, establishment of laws barring specific of free expression, criminal defamation laws that are usually indistinct, restrictions on freedom of the press, freedom of assembly and association, corruption of government officials, lack or absence of independence and neutrality in the judiciary, gross domestic violence against women, prohibition of same sex activities, sexual abuse on LGBTI persons, and human trafficking. While the government took efforts in examining, taking legal action, and punishing public officials who commit violations, impunity for police and security officials still exists and remains a problem in this country.

By 2016 in Egypt, public criticism of the government was declared banned. People get arrested when they have been suspected or proven to be involved in protests or attended protest rallies. Travel bans were ordered and assets of known human rights organizations were seized or frozen. Criminal charges were directed at NGO directors and the head of the Press Syndicate and against Egypt's leading anti-corruption personality. Members of the security forces continue to persecute and torment detainees and hundreds of people have mysteriously disappeared with little or no accountability in the part of government officials for infringement of the law.

As of April 2018, a UN document reported that thousands of horrible human rights violations have been performed by state-affiliated militias in Libya. Based on Amnesty International reports, forces allied to existing competing governments—in addition to the armed groups and private armies – continuously commit with grave callousness the desecration of global decrees and aggression towards human rights. These groups carry out random attacks in densely populated areas leading to thousands of civilian deaths. They persistently abduct, capriciously arrest and detain thousands of people for an indefinite period. Ruthless persecution and employment of other cruel methods were conducted inside prison cells. Women are confronted with abject discrimination, including illogical limitations on their right to travel. The death penalty continues to be in force.

In Mauritania, significant human rights concerns encompass laws restricting freedom of belief and stringent regulations carrying the death penalty. Additionally, challenges include limitations on minority rights, severe violence against women, the prohibition of same-sex activities, sexual assault targeting the LGBT community, and instances of human trafficking.

Despite governmental efforts to investigate, prosecute and penalize officials involved in abuses, the intertwining of the military and religious sectors remains a hurdle, particularly when it comes to advocating for equality for minorities. In this context, the Organization of Liberals Mauritania plays a crucial role in championing the rights of minorities and the LGBT community in Mauritania.

- Mauritania
- Morocco
- Sudan
- Tunisia
- Western Sahara

=== Sub-Saharan Africa ===
A 10-year imprisonment was sentenced to four Cameroon soldiers for shooting dead 2 women and 2 children in 2015. The shooting was captured in a video that was circulated online in 2018. In the video the soldiers were seen accusing the women of having links to Boko Haram, a terrorist organization.

- Angola
- Benin
- Botswana
- Burkina Faso
- Burundi
- Cameroon
- Cape Verde
- Central African Republic
- Chad
- Comoros
- Democratic Republic of the Congo
- Republic of the Congo
- Djibouti
- Egypt
- Equatorial Guinea
- Eritrea
- Ethiopia
- Eswatini
- Ghana
- Guinea
- Kenya
- Lesotho
- Liberia
- Madagascar
- Malawi
- Mali
- Niger
- Nigeria
- Rwanda
- São Tomé and Príncipe
- Sierra Leone
- Somalia
- South Africa
- South Sudan
- Tanzania
- Togo
- Uganda
- Zambia
- Zimbabwe

== See also ==
- Child Soldiers International
- Africa
- Democracy in Africa
- The Freedom of Thought Report in Mauritania 2020
- Liberals Mauritania
