= Joaquim Rafael Branco =

Prime Minister of São Tomé and Príncipe from 2008 to 2010

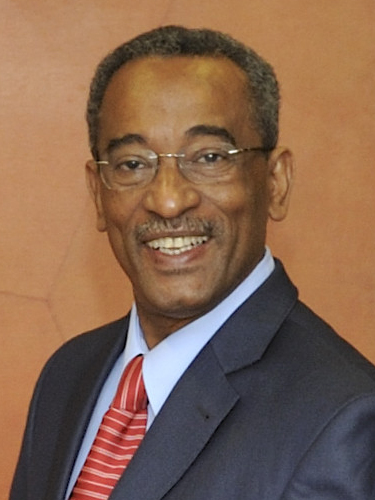
- Branco in 2009

16th Prime Minister of São Tomé and Príncipe
- In office 22 June 2008 – 14 August 2010
- President: Fradique de Menezes
- Preceded by: Patrice Trovoada
- Succeeded by: Patrice Trovoada

President of MLSTP–PSD
- In office 2007 – 16 January 2011
- Preceded by: Guilherme Posser da Costa
- Succeeded by: Aurélio Martins

Personal details
- Born: 7 September 1953 (age 73) Overseas Province of São Tomé and Príncipe, Portugal
- Party: Movement for the Liberation of São Tomé and Príncipe-Social Democratic Party

Joaquim Rafael Branco (born 7 September 1953) is a São Toméan politician who was the 16th prime Minister of São Tomé and Príncipe from 2008 to 2010. He once served as the President of the Movement for the Liberation of São Tomé and Príncipe/Social Democratic Party (MLSTP/PSD).

== Life and career ==
Branco was Minister of Finance from 1995 to 1996. He served as Minister of Foreign Affairs from 2000 to 2001. He was Minister of Public Works in July 2003, when he was detained by the military during a briefly successful coup d'etat led by Major Fernando Pereira.

After Prime Minister Patrice Trovoada was defeated in a May 2008 vote of no confidence proposed by the MLSTP/PSD, which was then in opposition, President Fradique de Menezes asked the MLSTP/PSD to form a government in June 2008, and it chose Branco to become the next prime minister. Trovoada's Independent Democratic Action (ADI) party denounced Menezes' designation of the MLSTP/PSD to form a government as unconstitutional.

Political offices
Preceded by Paulo Jorge Espirito Santo	Minister of Foreign Affairs; 2000–2001	Succeeded by Patrice Trovoada
Preceded by Patrice Trovoada	Prime Minister of São Tomé and Príncipe; 2008–2010	Succeeded by Patrice Trovoada
