= Guilherme Posser da Costa =

Prime Minister of São Tomé and Príncipe from 1991 to 2001

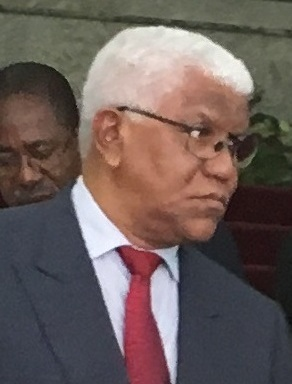
- Posser da Costa in 2018

9th Prime Minister of São Tomé and Príncipe
- In office 5 January 1999 – 26 September 2001
- President: Miguel Trovoada; Fradique de Menezes
- Preceded by: Raul Bragança Neto
- Succeeded by: Evaristo Carvalho

President of MLSTP–PSD
- In office 27 February 2005 – 2007
- Preceded by: Manuel Pinto da Costa
- Succeeded by: Joaquim Rafael Branco

Personal details
- Born: 18 May 1953 (age 73) São Tomé, Portuguese São Tomé and Príncipe
- Party: MLSTP/PSD
- Education: University of Coimbra

Guilherme Posser da Costa (born 18 May 1953) is a São Toméan who served as the ninth prime minister of São Tomé and Príncipe from 1999 to 2001. He also served as Minister of Foreign Affairs: 1987–1988, 1990–1991, and 1994–1996.

== Biography ==
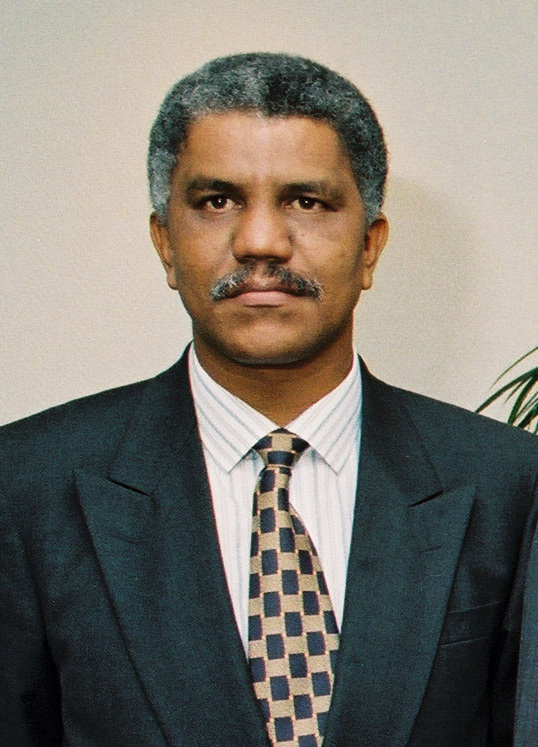
Posser da Costa in 1995

Guilherme Posser da Costa was born on 18 May 1953 in São Tomé, the main city of then-Portuguese São Tomé and Príncipe. He studied law at the University of Coimbra in Portugal, specializing in legal science; he graduated in June 1978. He is married and has three children.

Posser da Costa pursued a political career in the Movement for the Liberation of Sao Tome and Principe/Social Democratic Party (MLSTP/PSD), which was the sole legal party until the introduction of a multiparty system in 1991. He has held the parliamentary functions of deputy and vice-president of the National Assembly. Within the Ministry of Foreign Affairs, Posser da Costa served as Director of Political Affairs, Secretary of State and then Minister on three occasions: from 1987 to 1988, 1990 to 1991, and 1994 to 1996. He has also been Ambassador Extraordinary and Plenipotentiary to Belgium, France, Germany, the Netherlands, Sweden, the European Community, and the Food and Agriculture Organization. He was Prime Minister from 5 January 1999 to 26 September 2001.

In early November 2004, Posser da Costa allegedly damaged the office of Attorney General Adelino Pereira in an attack. Pereira said this was due to an investigation regarding embezzlement of aid funds and ordered Posser da Costa's arrest. Due to the alleged attack, Posser da Costa resigned from parliament on 15 February 2005, just before his parliamentary immunity was to be removed. On 18 March 2005, he received a two-year suspended sentence for damaging Pereira's office and "insulting public authority"; he was also required to pay compensation. For his part, Posser da Costa said that Pereira had falsely accused him of being involved in the embezzlement of aid funds, and that he had only been a witness in that case, not a suspect.

Posser da Costa was a member of the National Commission and the Political Commission of the MLSTP/PSD, and Vice President under the leadership of founder and former President Manuel Pinto da Costa. At the Fourth Congress of the MLSTP/PSD, Posser da Costa was elected party President on 27 February 2005, succeeding Pinto da Costa. There were 708 votes in favor of Posser da Costa, who was the only candidate, and three votes against him. He held this position until 2010, when he was replaced by Aurelio Martins.

Posser da Costa was nominated as the MLSTP/PSD candidate in the 2021 presidential election. Although he won the support of the MLSTP/PSD National Council with 83% of the vote, his competitors for the nomination chose to register as independent candidates in the election.

== Honours ==
- Grand Cross, Order of Prince Henry (1996)

Preceded by Fradique de Menezes	Foreign Minister of São Tomé and Príncipe; 1987–1988	Succeeded by Carlos da Graça
Preceded by Carlos da Graça	Foreign Minister of São Tomé and Príncipe; 1990–1991	Succeeded by Alda Bandeira
Preceded by Albertino Bragança	Foreign Minister of São Tomé and Príncipe; 1994–1996	Succeeded by Homero Jeronimo Salvaterra
Preceded by Raul Bragança Neto	Prime Minister of São Tomé and Príncipe; 1999–2001	Succeeded by Evaristo Carvalho
