= Patrice Trovoada =

São Toméan politician (born 1962)

His Excellency Patrice Trovoada
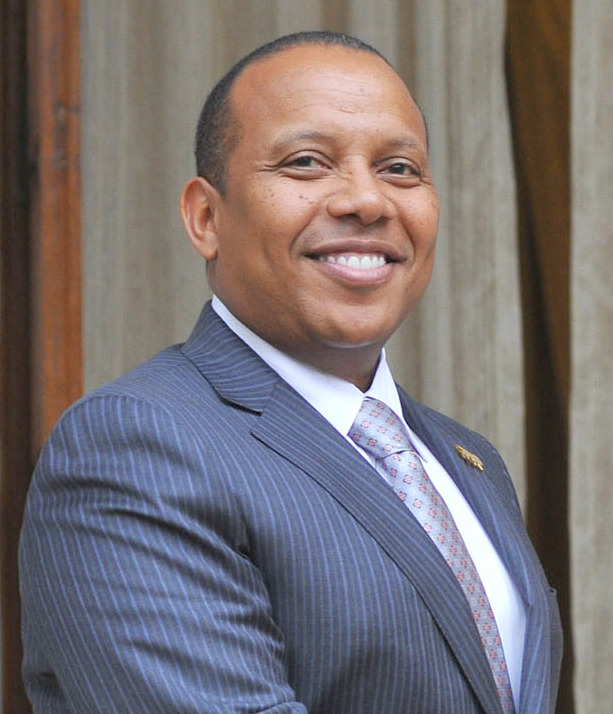
- Trovoada in 2015

15th Prime Minister of São Tomé and Príncipe
- In office 11 November 2022 – 6 January 2025
- President: Carlos Vila Nova
- Preceded by: Jorge Bom Jesus
- Succeeded by: Ilza Amado Vaz
- In office 25 November 2014 – 3 December 2018
- President: Manuel Pinto da Costa; Evaristo Carvalho
- Preceded by: Gabriel Costa
- Succeeded by: Jorge Bom Jesus
- In office 14 August 2010 – 12 December 2012
- President: Fradique de Menezes; Manuel Pinto da Costa
- Preceded by: Joaquim Rafael Branco
- Succeeded by: Gabriel Costa
- In office 14 February 2008 – 22 June 2008
- President: Fradique de Menezes
- Preceded by: Tomé Vera Cruz
- Succeeded by: Joaquim Rafael Branco

President of Independent Democratic Action
- In office 9 April 2022 – 27 June 2026 (Note: Exercised undisputed authority as party president from 10 July 2020, but remained unrecognized by the Constitutional Court until 9 April 2022)
- Preceded by: Agostinho Fernandes
- Succeeded by: Américo Ramos
- In office 8 July 2010 – 25 May 2019
- Preceded by: New title (Note: Previously led the party as Secretary-General)
- Succeeded by: Agostinho Fernandes

Secretary-General of Independent Democratic Action
- In office 2001 – 8 July 2010
- Preceded by: Carlos Neves
- Succeeded by: Evaristo Carvalho (Note: Trovoada remained party leader as party President)

Personal details
- Born: 18 March 1962 (age 64) Libreville, Gabon
- Party: Independent Democratic Action
- Spouse: Nana Trovoada

Patrice Émery Trovoada (born 18 March 1962) is a São Toméan politician who was the 15th prime minister of São Tomé and Príncipe from November 2022 to 6 January 2025. He previously served as prime minister from February 2008 to June 2008, from August 2010 to December 2012 and again from November 2014 to December 2018.

== Life and career ==
Trovoada was born in Libreville, Gabon. He is the son of Miguel Trovoada, who was president of São Tomé and Príncipe from 1991 to 2001, and was named after Patrice Lumumba, the first Prime Minister of Congo (Léopoldville). He studied in Portugal and France.

He served as the Minister of Foreign Affairs from September 2001 to 4 February 2002. He was also oil adviser to President Fradique de Menezes until Menezes fired him in May 2005, alleging that Trovoada had used his position to advance his business interests.

Trovoada is secretary-general of Independent Democratic Action (ADI), a political party. He ran for president in the July 2006 presidential election, but was defeated by Menezes, the incumbent president. Trovoada was the only major opposition candidate, and he received 38.82% of the vote.

On 14 February 2008, Trovoada became prime minister; he was appointed by Menezes following the resignation of Tomé Vera Cruz.

On 4 March 2008, he made a brief official visit to Gabon.

Trovoada's government was defeated in a censure motion in the National Assembly on 20 May 2008 after three months in office. The motion, introduced by the opposition Movement for the Liberation of São Tomé and Príncipe/Social Democratic Party (MLSTP/PSD), received 30 votes in favor, 23 opposed, and two abstaining. In June, Menezes asked the MLSTP/PSD to form a government, and it chose its leader, Joaquim Rafael Branco, as prime minister.

After the 2010 parliamentary election, Trovoada returned as prime minister on 14 August 2010, but left office on 13 December 2012, after his government had lost its majority in parliament. However, the parliamentary election of 2014 again produced a majority for Trovoada's Independent Democratic Action party, with 33 of the 55 seats in the National Assembly, and he was again appointed to head a new government. He left office in 2018.

Trovoada became prime minister again in November 2022. On 6 January 2025, President Carlos Vila Nova dismissed Trovoada and his government, citing Trovoada's prolonged absences and his government's failure to solve multiple issues. Trovoada called his dismissal "illegal" and "unconstitutional".

== Notes ==
Political offices
Preceded by Joaquim Rafael Branco	Minister of Foreign Affairs; 2001–2002	Succeeded by Mateus Meira Rita
Preceded by Tomé Vera Cruz	Prime Minister of São Tomé and Príncipe; 2008	Succeeded by Joaquim Rafael Branco
Preceded by Joaquim Rafael Branco	Prime Minister of São Tomé and Príncipe; 2010–2012	Succeeded by Gabriel Costa
Preceded by Gabriel Costa	Prime Minister of São Tomé and Príncipe; 2014–2018	Succeeded by Jorge Bom Jesus
Preceded by Jorge Bom Jesus	Prime Minister of São Tomé and Príncipe; 2022–2025	Succeeded by Ilza Amado Vaz
