= 1996 São Toméan presidential election =

- 30 June 1996 (first round); 21 July 1996 (second round)
- Registered: 50,526 (first round); 49,606 (second round)
- Turnout: 76.87% (first round); 76.87% (second round)
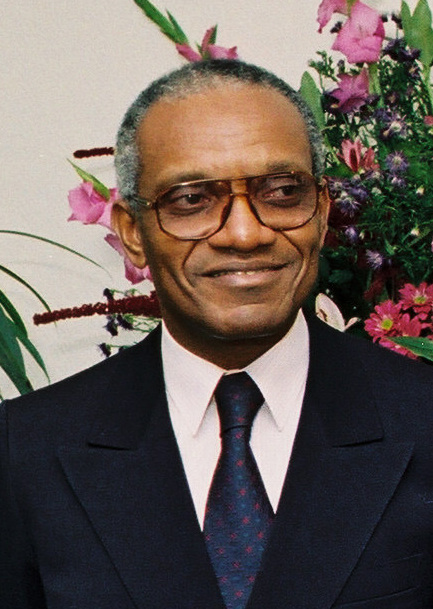

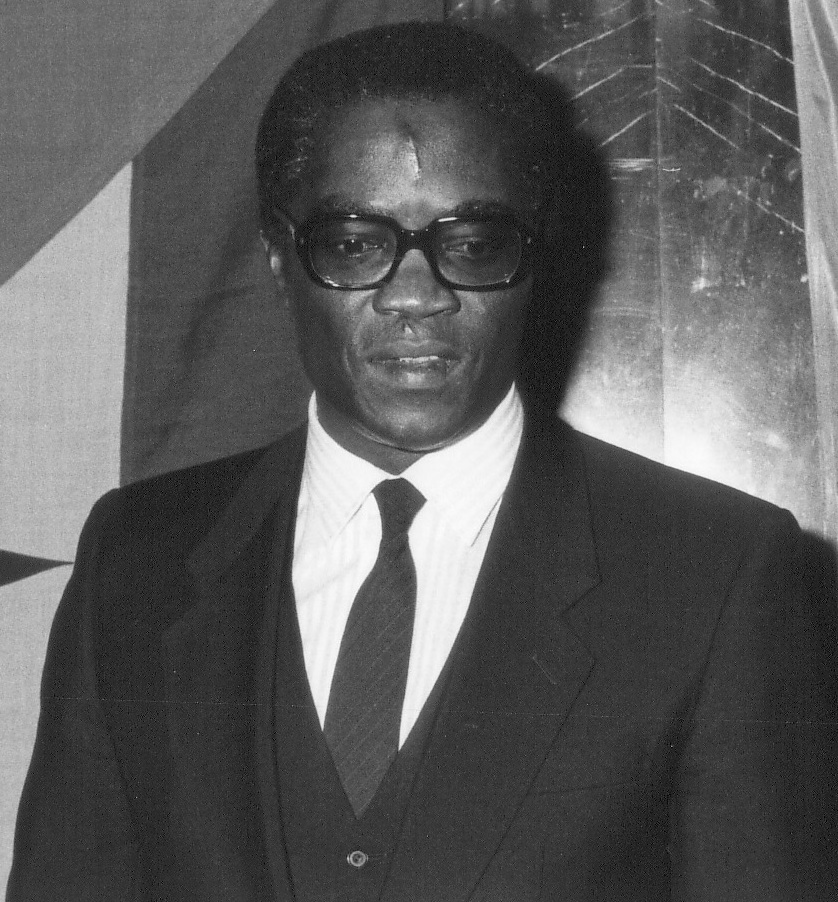
Candidate	Miguel Trovoada	Manuel Pinto da Costa
Party	ADI	MLSTP–PSD
Popular vote	19,887	17,820
Percentage	52.74%	47.26%
President before election
Miguel Trovoada
ADI
Elected President
Miguel Trovoada
ADI

Presidential elections were held in São Tomé and Príncipe on 30 June 1996. The election was contested by four candidates; incumbent President Miguel Trovoada, former President Manuel Pinto da Costa, Alda Bandeira, a former Foreign Minister, and former Prime Minister Carlos da Graça. No candidate won a majority of votes in the first round, in which voter turnout in the first round was 77.3%, resulting in a second round being held on 21 July between the two leading candidates - Trovoada and da Costa. Trovoada won the election with 52.7% of the vote, based on a 78.7% turnout.

== Results ==
Candidate	Party	First round		Second round	
Candidate	Party	Votes	%	Votes	%
Miguel Trovoada	Independent Democratic Action	15,344	41.38	19,887	52.74
Manuel Pinto da Costa	MLSTP/PSD	13,627	36.75	17,820	47.26
Alda Bandeira	Democratic Convergence Party	5,970	16.10		
Carlos da Graça	Independent	1,973	5.32		
Armindo Tomba	Independent	163	0.44		
Total		37,077	100.00	37,707	100.00
Valid votes		37,077	95.46	37,707	96.63
Invalid/blank votes		1,764	4.54	1,317	3.37
Total votes		38,841	100.00	39,024	100.00
Registered voters/turnout		50,526	76.87	49,606	78.67
Source: Nohlen et al.

== Aftermath ==
Despite being declared generally free and fair by international and domestic observers, da Costa, who had initially acknowledged Trovoada's victory, contested the results of the election, claiming that irregularities had occurred in the registration process. The National Electoral Commission acknowledged that there were minor discrepancies in the registration process and in voter rolls but determined that these were insufficient to call the results into question.

In early August the Supreme Court declared that it was unable to adjudicate on the appeal made by da Costa, and recommended that the government seek international legal arbitration. However, on 20 August da Costa withdrew his challenge and Trovoada was confirmed as president.
