= List of presidents of São Tomé and Príncipe =

President of the Democratic Republic of São Tomé and Príncipe
- Presidente da República Democrática de São Tomé e Príncipe
- Coat of arms of São Tomé and Príncipe

- Presidential standard of São Tomé and Príncipe

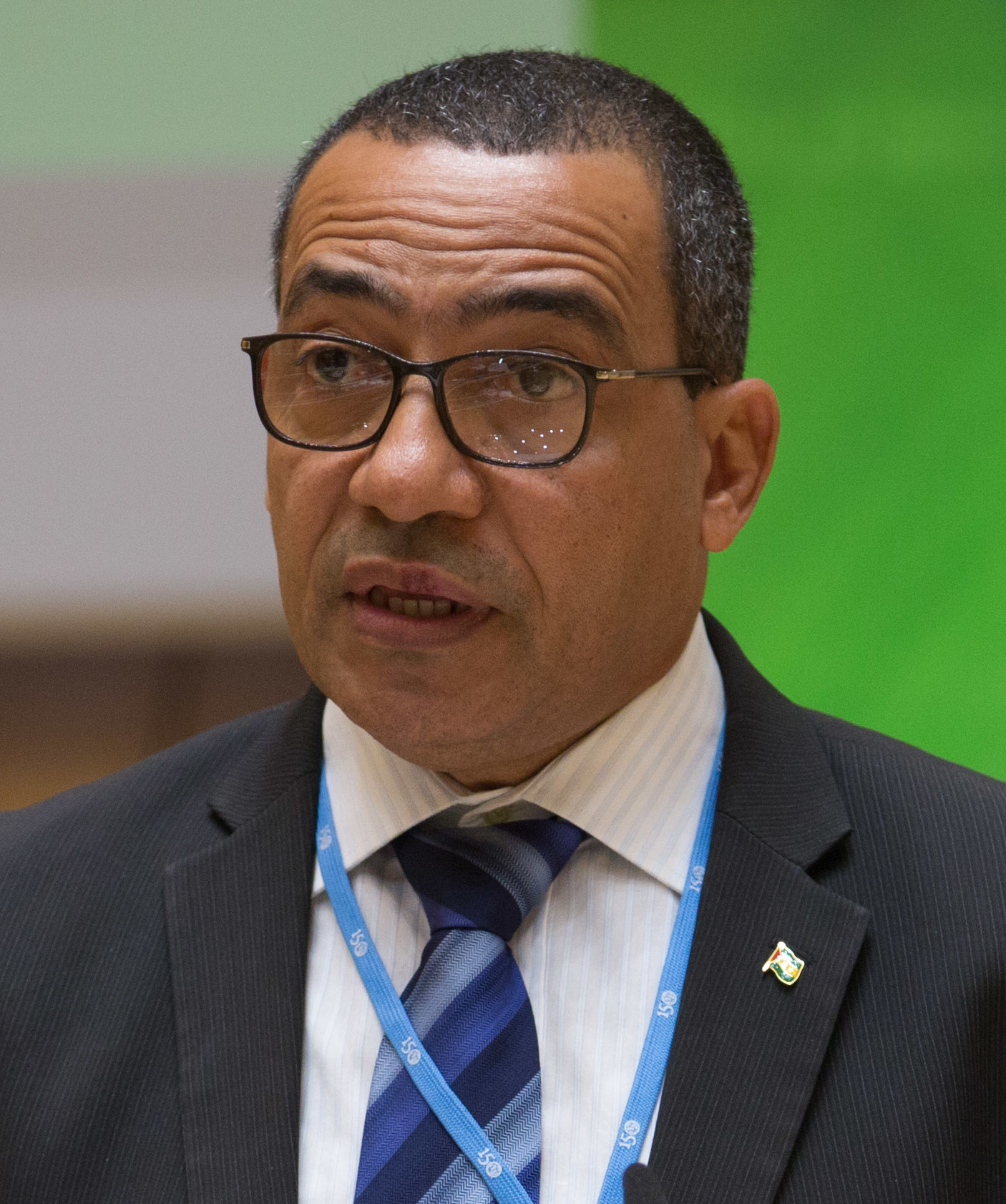
- Incumbent; Carlos Vila Nova since 2 October 2021
- Type: Head of state
- Residence: Presidential Palace, São Tomé
- Term length: Five years, renewable once
- Constituting instrument: Constitution of São Tomé and Príncipe (1975)
- Formation: 12 July 1975; 51 years ago
- First holder: Manuel Pinto da Costa
- Salary: Db 60,830,000 annually

This article lists the presidents of São Tomé and Príncipe, an island country in the Gulf of Guinea off the western equatorial coast of Central Africa, since the establishment of the office of president in 1975. Manuel Pinto da Costa was the first person to hold the office, taking effect on 12 July 1975. The incumbent is Carlos Vila Nova, having taken office on 2 October 2021.

== Term limits ==
As of 2021, there is a two-term limit for the president in the Constitution of São Tomé and Príncipe. The first president for whom the term limits applied was Trovoada in 2001.

== List of officeholders ==
Political parties

Movement for the Liberation of São Tomé and Príncipe – Social Democratic Party (MLSTP–PSD)
Democratic Convergence Party (PCD)
Independent Democratic Action (ADI)
Force for Change Democratic Movement – Liberal Party (MDFM–PL)

Other factions

Military
Independent

Symbols

Denotes acting president

No.	Portrait	Name (Birth–Death)	Elected	Term of office			Political party
No.	Portrait	Name (Birth–Death)	Elected	Took office	Left office	Time in office	Political party
1		Manuel Pinto da Costa (born 1937)	—	12 July 1975	4 March 1991	15 years, 235 days	MLSTP–PSD
—		Leonel Mário d'Alva (born 1935); Acting president	—	4 March 1991	3 April 1991	30 days	PCD
2		Miguel Trovoada (born 1936)	1991	3 April 1991	15 August 1995 (Deposed)	4 years, 134 days	Independent (until 1994)
		Miguel Trovoada (born 1936)	1991	3 April 1991	15 August 1995 (Deposed)	4 years, 134 days	ADI
—		Lieutenant; Manuel Quintas de Almeida (1957–2006); Chairman of the National Salvation Junta	—	15 August 1995	21 August 1995	6 days	Military
(2)		Miguel Trovoada (born 1936)	1996	21 August 1995	3 September 2001	6 years, 13 days	ADI
3		Fradique de Menezes (born 1942)	2001	3 September 2001	16 July 2003 (Deposed)	1 year, 316 days	MDFM–PL
—		Major; Fernando Pereira (born 1963); Chairman of the Military Junta of National Salvation	—	16 July 2003	23 July 2003	7 days	Military
(3)		Fradique de Menezes (born 1942)	2006	23 July 2003	3 September 2011	8 years, 42 days	MDFM–PL
(1)		Manuel Pinto da Costa (born 1937)	2011	3 September 2011	3 September 2016	5 years	Independent
4		Evaristo Carvalho (1941–2022)	2016	3 September 2016	2 October 2021	5 years, 29 days	ADI
5		Carlos Vila Nova (born 1959)	2021	2 October 2021	Incumbent	4 years, 340 days	ADI (until 2026)
		Carlos Vila Nova (born 1959)	2026	2 October 2021	Incumbent	4 years, 340 days	Independent

== See also ==
- List of governors of Portuguese São Tomé and Príncipe
- List of presidents of the Regional Government of Príncipe
- List of prime ministers of São Tomé and Príncipe
- Ministry of Foreign Affairs, Cooperation and Communities
- Politics of São Tomé and Príncipe
