= Movement for the Liberation of São Tomé and Príncipe – Social Democratic Party =

Political party in São Tomé and Príncipe

Movement for the Liberation of São Tomé and Príncipe – Social Democratic Party Movimento de Libertação de São Tomé e Príncipe – Partido Social Democrata
- Abbreviation: MLSTP–PSD
- Leader: Américo Barros
- Founded: September 1960; 66 years ago
- Headquarters: Riboque, São Tomé, São Tomé and Príncipe
- Ideology: Social democracy; Democratic socialism; Left-wing nationalism; Historical: Communism; Marxism–Leninism
- Political position: Centre-left to left-wing; Historical: Far-left
- Continental affiliation: CONCP (1961–1979)
- International affiliation: Progressive Alliance; Socialist International (consultative)
- National Assembly: 24 / 55 (44%)

Party flag

Website
- www.mlstp.net

The Movement for the Liberation of São Tomé and Príncipe – Social Democratic Party (Portuguese: Movimento de Libertação de São Tomé e Príncipe – Partido Social Democrata, abbr. MLSTP–PSD), previously known as the Committee for the Liberation of São Tomé and Príncipe, and later the Movement for the Liberation of São Tomé and Príncipe after 1972, is a social democratic political party in São Tomé and Príncipe. It is one of the main political forces in the country. The party originally started as a Marxist-Leninist guerrilla group opposed to Portuguese colonialism. It later governed the country from independence under a One-party state until 1990, with Manuel Pinto da Costa serving as president. It facilitated a democratic transition after 1990 as well as adopting social democracy and democratic socialism as its official ideology. Américo Barros is the current president of the party.

== History ==
=== Early years ===
Flag of MLSTP (1972–1990)

Alternative flag of MLSTP (1972–1990)

The party, then called the Committee for the Liberation of São Tomé and Príncipe, was founded in 1960 as a nationalist group opposed to Portuguese colonial rule. In 1961 it joined the CONCP with other communist and socialist groups fighting against the Portuguese Empire in Africa. The CLSTP was set up by exiles who eventually established their base in nearby Gabon. Manuel Pinto da Costa, who would eventually become President of an independent São Tomé and Príncipe, was the leader of the party. In 1972, the CLSTP became the MLSTP.

After the April 1974 Carnation Revolution in Portugal, the new government agreed to hand over power to the MLSTP. Later that year, the MLSTP was recognized as the sole legitimate representative of the Santomean people.

=== Independence and one-party rule ===
Following a brief period of transitional government, elections were held for a constituent assembly and the MLSTP won all 16 of its seats.

Independence was achieved on 12 July 1975, with Manuel Pinto da Costa as president and Miguel Trovoada as prime minister. The constitution promulgated on 12 December 1975, effectively vested absolute power in the President and the MLSTP became the nation's sole legal political party.

During the late 1970s and 1980s, the party's socialist orientation and in turn the nation's orientation led to strong ties with Cuba, East Germany and the Soviet Union.

=== Transition to democratic rule ===
In late 1989, a progressive faction within the party embarked on a transition to full multi-party system, after a debate at the national party conference.

A democratic constitution introduced by the MLSTP Central Committee was approved overwhelmingly in an August 1990 referendum.

At the MLSTP Party Congress in October 1990, Carlos Graça was appointed as the new Secretary-General, in succession to Manuel Pinto da Costa. In addition, the party's name was amended to the Movement for the Liberation of São Tomé and Príncipe – Social Democratic Party (MLSTP–PSD).

In an extraordinary Congress of the MLSTP–PSD held in May 1998, Manuel Pinto da Costa was elected unopposed as President of the party, a post that he held until 2005.

At the party's Fourth Congress, Guilherme Posser da Costa, a former prime minister, was elected as president of the MLSTP–PSD on 27 February 2005, succeeding Pinto da Costa. There were 708 votes in favor of Posser da Costa, who was the only candidate, and three votes against him. As of June 2008, the President of the MLSTP–PSD is Joaquim Rafael Branco.

In June 2008, after Prime Minister Patrice Trovoada of the Independent Democratic Action (ADI) party was defeated in a vote of no confidence, President Fradique de Menezes asked the MLSTP–PSD to form a government, and it chose Branco to become the next prime minister. The ADI denounced Menezes' designation of the MLSTP–PSD to form a government as unconstitutional, arguing that it was too late in the parliamentary term to do so, and it took the matter to the Supreme Tribunal of Justice.

The current president of the MLSTP–PSD, Américo Barros, was elected on 7 September 2024.

Today the MLSTP–PSD has friendly relations with political parties in other Lusophone countries, including the Socialist Party (PS) in Portugal and the People's Movement for the Liberation of Angola (MPLA).

== Performance in recent elections ==
In the nation's first democratic elections, held in January 1991, the party suffered a defeat at the polls capturing only 30.5% of the vote and 21 seats in the 55-member National Assembly.

December 1992 local elections resulted in the MLSTP–PSD gaining control of five of the country's seven provinces.

In the 1994 legislative elections, the party received 37% of the vote and regained control of the National Assembly winning 27 of the 55-seats, one short of an absolute majority.

March 1995 elections to the newly created seven member assembly on the smaller island of Príncipe resulted in another victory for the party.

Manuel Pinto da Costa ran as the MLSTP–PSD candidate in the 1996 presidential election. In the first round, he came in second behind the incumbent President Miguel Trovoada, winning 39% of the vote to Trovoada's 41%. In the second round he was defeated by Trovoada who captured 52.7% of the vote to his 47.3%.

In the 1998 legislative elections, the MLSTP–PSD won 50.6% of the vote and increased its majority in the National Assembly from 27 to 31 seats.

In the July 2001 presidential election, Manuel Pinto da Costa again attempted to regain the presidency, but was soundly defeated by businessman Fradique de Menezes 55.2% to 40.0%.

March 2002 legislative elections maintained the MLSTP–PSD's status as the largest party in the National Assembly, but only by one seat. The party received 39.6% of the vote and won 24 of the 55-seats.

In the 26 March 2006 legislative election, the party finished second behind the Force for Change Democratic Movement-Democratic Convergence Party (MDFM–PCD) coalition, winning 20 out of 55 seats.

The party did not field a candidate in the 30 July 2006 presidential election, opting to join a coalition of parties supporting Patrice Trovoada of the Independent Democratic Action (ADI) party. He was defeated by the incumbent Fradique de Menezes, winning 38.82% of the vote to de Menezes' 60.58%.

In the most recent parliamentary elections held on 1 August 2010, the MLSTP–PSD became the second largest party (behind ADI), winning 21 seats. In 2011, Pinto da Costa finally succeeded in regaining the presidency, although officially running as an independent.

Evaristo Carvalho was the president of São Tomé and Príncipe, after defeating the incumbent President Manuel Pinto da Costa in the 2016 elections. President Carvalho is also Vice president of the Independent Democratic Action party (ADI). Patrice Emery Trovoada was prime minister since 2014 and he is the leader of Independent Democratic Action party (ADI). In December 2018, Jorge Bom Jesus, the leader of the MLSTP–PSD, was sworn in as new prime minister.

In the 2021 elections Independent Democratic Action candidate Carlos Vila Nova won against MLSTP-PSD candidate Guilherme Posser da Costa with 58% of the vote. Nova was sworn in as president 2 October 2021.

== Electoral history ==
=== Presidential elections ===
Election	Party candidate	Votes	%	Votes	%	Result
Election	Party candidate	First round		Second round		Result
1996	Manuel Pinto da Costa	13,627	37.7%	17,820	47.3%	Lost ✗
2001	Manuel Pinto da Costa	18,762	39.98%	–	–	Lost ✗
2006	Supported Patrice Trovoada (ADI)	22,339	38.8%	–	–	Lost ✗
2011	Aurélio Martins	2,445	4.06%	–	–	Lost ✗
2016	Maria das Neves	16,828	24.31%	–	–	Lost ✗
2021	Guilherme Posser da Costa	16,829	20.75%	33,557	42.46%	Lost ✗
2026	Supported Carlos Vila Nova (Independent)	31,613	55.88%	–	–	Won ✓

=== National Assembly elections ===
Election	Party leader	Votes	%	Seats	+/–	Position
1975	Manuel Pinto da Costa			16 / 16	▲16	▲1st
1980	Manuel Pinto da Costa			40 / 40	▲24	1st
1985	Manuel Pinto da Costa			51 / 51	▲11	1st
1991	Carlos Graça	12,090	30.31%	21 / 55	▼30	▼2nd
1994	Carlos Graça	10,782	42.53%	27 / 55	▲6	▲1st
1998	Manuel Pinto da Costa	14,785	50.61%	31 / 55	▲4	1st
2002	Manuel Pinto da Costa	15,618	39.68%	24 / 55	▼7	1st
2006	Guilherme Posser da Costa	15,733	30.21%	20 / 55	▼4	▼2nd
2010	Joaquim Rafael Branco	22,510	32.81%	21 / 55	▲1	2nd
2014	Jorge Amado	16,573	24.71%	16 / 55	▼5	2nd
2018	Jorge Bom Jesus	31,634	40.32%	23 / 55	▲7	2nd
2022	Jorge Bom Jesus	25,287	32.73%	18 / 55	▼5	2nd
2026	Américo Barros	18,622	37.45%	24 / 55	▲6	▲1st
