= Evaristo Carvalho =

President of São Tomé and Príncipe from 2016 to 2021

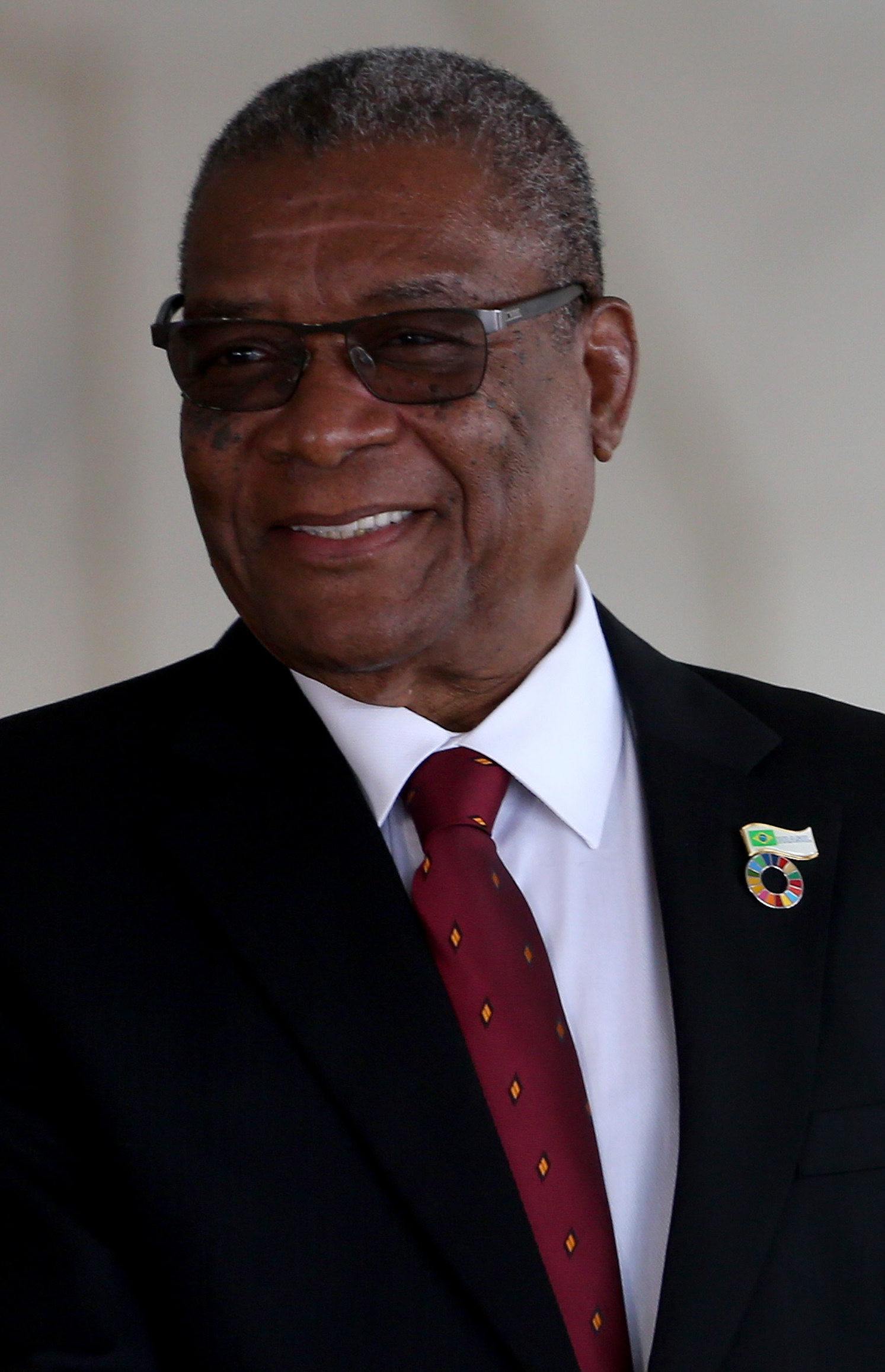

4th President of São Tomé and Príncipe
- In office 3 September 2016 – 2 October 2021
- Prime Minister: Patrice Trovoada; Jorge Bom Jesus
- Preceded by: Manuel Pinto da Costa
- Succeeded by: Carlos Vila Nova

5th Prime Minister of São Tomé and Príncipe
- In office 26 September 2001 – 28 March 2002
- President: Fradique de Menezes
- Preceded by: Guilherme Posser da Costa
- Succeeded by: Gabriel Costa
- In office 7 July 1994 – 25 October 1994
- President: Miguel Trovoada
- Preceded by: Norberto Costa Alegre
- Succeeded by: Carlos Graça

Personal details
- Born: Evaristo do Espírito Santo Carvalho; 22 October 1941 São Tomé and Príncipe
- Died: 28 May 2022 (aged 80) Lisbon, Portugal
- Party: Independent Democratic Action

Evaristo do Espírito Santo Carvalho (22 October 1941 – 28 May 2022) was a São Toméan politician who served as the fourth president of São Tomé and Príncipe from 2016 to 2021. He was previously the prime minister of the country on two occasions.

== Political career ==
Carvalho was the Minister of National Defence from 1992 to 1994. He was prime minister of São Tomé and Príncipe from 7 July 1994 to 25 October 1994 and again from 26 September 2001 to 28 March 2002. He was a member of the Independent Democratic Action (ADI) party.

Carvalho contested the 2011 São Toméan presidential election, while he was the President of the National Assembly. He had been supported in his campaign by then current Prime Minister Patrice Trovoada. Carvalho finished second in the first round with 21.8 percent of the vote, behind former president, Manuel Pinto da Costa. Costa was victorious in the two person runoff election, with 52.9 percent of the vote. Carvalho subsequently became vice president of the ADI.

=== Presidency ===
In the July 2016 presidential election, Carvalho won the most votes but fell slightly short of a majority with 49.9 percent, so a second round runoff was held a few weeks later. However, Costa, the incumbent president, withdrew from the 7 August runoff poll, alleging fraud in the July election. This effectively handed the presidency to Carvalho. He was inaugurated into the role on 3 September. The election process was well received internationally, with a United States Department of State press release stating that "This election is a yet another demonstration of São Tomé and Príncipe's long-standing commitment to democratic values. Through their exemplary conduct, the people of São Tomé and Príncipe continue to serve as a beacon of democracy for other countries."

== Death ==
On 28 May 2022, Carvalho died following a prolonged illness. He was 80.
