= Carlos Graça =

Prime Minister of São Tomé and Príncipe from 1994 to 1995

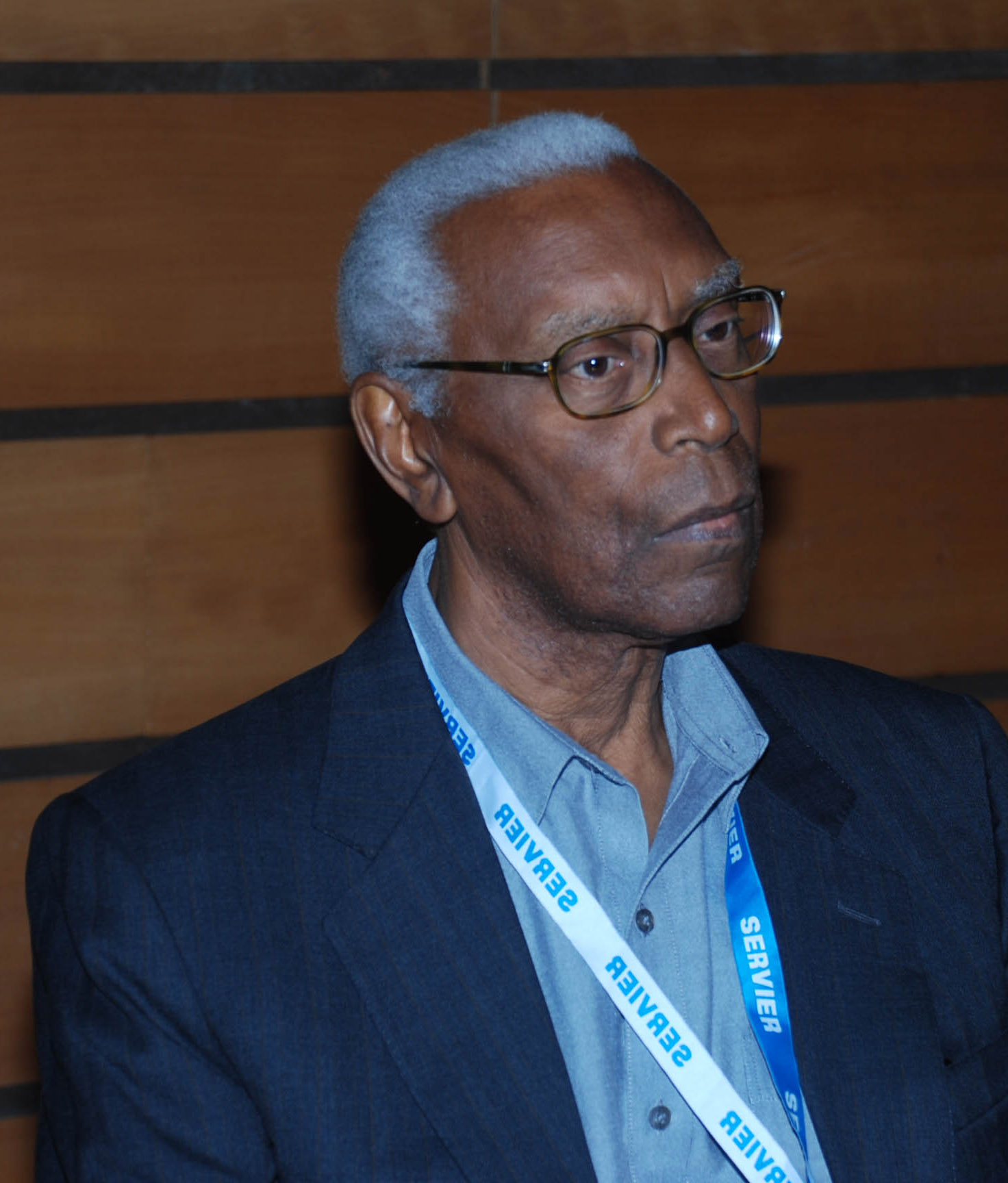

6th Prime Minister of São Tomé and Príncipe
- In office 25 October 1994 – 31 December 1995*
- President: Miguel Trovoada
- Preceded by: Evaristo Carvalho
- Succeeded by: Armindo Vaz d'Almeida

Secretary-General of MLSTP–PSD
- In office October 1990 – March 1996
- Preceded by: Manuel Pinto da Costa (as Secretary-General of MLSTP)
- Succeeded by: Francisco Fortunato Pires

Personal details
- Born: 22 December 1931 São Tomé Island, Overseas Province of São Tomé and Príncipe, Portugal
- Died: 17 April 2013 (aged 81) Lisbon, Portugal
- Party: MLSTP/PSD
- *Carlos Graça was briefly deposed from 15 August 1995 – 21 August 1995 by Manuel Quintas de Almeida.

Carlos Alberto Monteiro Dias da Graça (22 December 1931 – 17 April 2013) was a São Toméan politician who served as the country's sixth prime minister.

== Biography ==
Graça was one of the co-founders of the Movement for the Liberation of São Tomé and Príncipe (MLSTP). After 25 April 1974 revolution in Portugal he was a member of the transition government preparing the independence of São Tomé and Príncipe. After the independence in 1975 he became Minister of Social Affairs. He was the first founder of the MLSTP raising his opposition to the move of the regime towards a dictatorial Marxist–Leninist regime. For this reason he was sentenced 24 years jail and had to go into exile again in 1977, becoming one of the main opponents to Manuel Pinto da Costa regime. He was asked by Pinto da Costa to come back to Sao Tome in 1987, in order to prepare the transition to a multi-party democracy. He served as Minister of Foreign Affairs from 1988 to 1990, while being one of the main politicians preparing the new democratic constitution and the first free elections.

After the first free elections he became leader of the MLSTP, which he turned into the Movement for the Liberation of São Tomé and Príncipe (MLSTP/PSD). He led his party to victory in the 1994 general election and became prime minister on 25 October. A short lived military coup d'état temporarily deposed the elected government from 15 August 1995 to 21 August 1995. Civilian rule was restored on 21 August 1995 and Graça remained prime minister until 31 December 1995. He is considered as one of the main architects of the democracy in his country. Graça was elected Chairman of the Committee on Social Affairs and at the end of the term in 2006 he moved away from the political party active life.

He died on 17 April 2013 in Lisbon at the age of 81.

== Works ==
His published works include:

- Essay on the Human condition in 2004, Edited by IDD - Institute for Democracy and Development
- John Paul II Politico, his role in the fall of communism in 2006, Edited by UNEAS-National Union of Writers and Artists STP; in 2007
- Che Guevara: mythical character, Issue IDD, and Autobiography
- Political Memoirs of a Nationalist Sui Generis Santomense, Edition UNEAS, 2012

Government offices
Preceded by Evaristo Carvalho	Prime Minister of São Tomé and Príncipe; 1994–1995	Succeeded by Armindo Vaz d'Almeida
Political offices
Preceded by Guilherme Posser da Costa	Foreign Minister of São Tomé and Príncipe; 1988–1990	Succeeded by Guilherme Posser da Costa
