= Fradique de Menezes =

President of São Tomé and Príncipe from 2001 to 2011

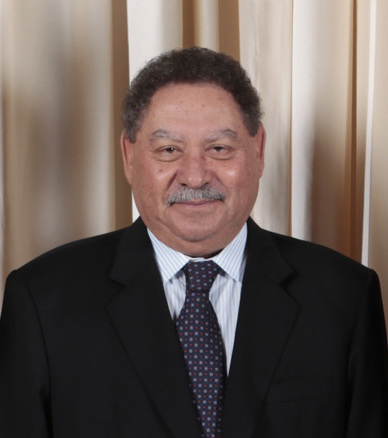

3rd President of São Tomé and Príncipe
- In office July 23, 2003 – September 3, 2011
- Prime Minister: Maria das Neves; Damião Vaz d'Almeida; Maria do Carmo Silveira; Tomé Vera Cruz; Patrice Trovoada; Joaquim Rafael Branco; Patrice Trovoada
- Preceded by: Fernando Pereira (acting)
- Succeeded by: Manuel Pinto da Costa
- In office September 3, 2001 – July 16, 2003
- Prime Minister: Guilherme Posser da Costa; Evaristo Carvalho; Gabriel Costa; Maria das Neves
- Preceded by: Miguel Trovoada
- Succeeded by: Fernando Pereira (acting)

Personal details
- Born: March 21, 1942 (age 84) São Tomé, Overseas Province of São Tomé and Príncipe, Portugal
- Party: Force for Change Democratic Movement-Liberal Party
- Education: Free University of Brussels
- Occupation: Businessman

Fradique Bandeira Melo de Menezes (born March 21, 1942) is a São Toméan politician who was the third president of São Tomé and Príncipe from 2001 to 2011.

== Early life ==
Menezes was born on the then Portuguese colony of São Tomé in 1942, the son of a Portuguese man and a local woman. He attended high school in Portugal. He then studied at the Instituto Superior de Psicologia Aplicada in Lisbon, Portugal and Free University of Brussels.

== Career ==
Menezes is a businessman. He was Foreign Minister of São Tome and Príncipe from 1986 until 1987. He was elected President in July 2001 with about 55.2% of the vote, defeating Manuel Pinto da Costa, who received about 40%. Menezes took office on September 3, 2001. His eligibility as a candidate had been questioned, since he also held Portuguese citizenship, but he renounced this and his candidacy was approved.

Almost immediately into his presidency, Menezes faced a political deadlock with the country's parliament, the National Assembly. After the March 3, 2002, parliamentary election, Menezes appointed Gabriel Costa of Independent Democratic Action (ADI) as prime minister to lead a coalition government that included all the parties in the National Assembly. However, on September 27 he dismissed the Costa government and on October 3 replaced Costa with Maria das Neves of the Movement for the Liberation of São Tomé and Príncipe – Social Democratic Party (MLSTP–PSD). The move cost Menezes the support of his own party, the Force for Change Democratic Movement (MDFM), as well as its parliamentary partner, the Democratic Convergence Party (PCD).

Consequently in late October, opposition parties tabled a motion to revise the constitution, ostensibly to fix ambiguities that they blamed for conflict between the president and National Assembly since 1991. The amendments, proposed to go into effect after the completion of Menezes's term in 2006, aimed to curtail the powers of the president and increase the influence of the National Assembly. In December 2002, 52 of the 55 deputies of the National Assembly voted in favour of the amendments, prompting Menezes to denounce and veto the amendments, as well as demand a national referendum on the revised constitution. The National Assembly ignored Menezes's demand and its deputies reaffirmed their vote and approved the new constitution a second time on January 17, 2003. In response, Menezes dissolved the National Assembly on January 21 and called for early elections on April 13. However, Menezes and the National Assembly quickly came to a memorandum of understanding on January 24; Menezes pledged to promulgate the amendments, while the National Assembly agreed to hold a national referendum on the country's system of government at the end of Menezes's presidential term in 2006.

Conflict between Menezes and the National Assembly continued despite the memorandum of understanding, and in April 2003 an open later signed by Menezes's opponents was published, accusing Menezes of corruption, incompetence, and lacking transparency. In particular, his opponents highlighted a US$100,000 transfer from Nigerian Chrome Oil Services to the Belgian bank account of a São Tomé–based private company owned by Menezes. Menezes subsequently held a three-hour press conference attacking the character of the letter's signatories and explaining that the transfer had been a political donation split evenly between the MDFM and the PCD. The president had inadvertently admitted to violating the country's laws, which forbid political parties from receiving money from foreign companies.

On July 16, 2003, a faction of the military led by Fernando "Cobo" Pereira launched a coup d'état to depose Menezes while he was away in Nigeria. However, Menezes was restored to power on July 23, 2003, following an agreement with Pereira and other coup leaders.

Menezes was re-elected on July 30, 2006, winning 60.58% of the vote and defeating Patrice Trovoada, son of former president Miguel Trovoada.

The discovery of a coup plot allegedly involving Christian Democratic Front leader Arlecio Costa was announced on February 12, 2009. Costa and more than 30 others were arrested. At a press conference on February 24, Menezes said that he was "touched" by the support of the security forces; he also said that he would be willing to leave office if he was "the reason that things are not working in this country".

Menezes received the World Peace Culture Award on July 13, 2002.

Political offices
Preceded by Maria do Nascimento da Graça Amorim	Minister of Foreign Affairs; 1986–1987	Succeeded by Guilherme Posser da Costa
Preceded by Miguel Trovoada	President of São Tomé and Príncipe; 2001–2003	Succeeded by Fernando Pereira; Acting
Preceded by Fernando Pereira; Acting	President of São Tomé and Príncipe; 2003–2011	Succeeded by Manuel Pinto da Costa
