= Independent Democratic Action =

Political party in São Tomé and Príncipe

Independent Democratic Action Acção Democrática Independente
- Abbreviation: ADI
- Leader: Américo Ramos
- Founded: 1994
- Ideology: Christian democracy
- Political position: Centre-right
- International affiliation: Centrist Democrat International
- National Assembly: 23 / 55 (42%)

Party flag

Website
- adi-stp.st

The Independent Democratic Action (Portuguese: Acção Democrática Independente) is a political party in São Tomé and Príncipe. It was established in 1994 by the then president Miguel Trovoada and is a politically centre-right party.

It took part in the 29 July 2001 presidential elections, in which its candidate, Fradique de Menezes, won 55.2% of the vote and was elected president. After the elections Fradique de Menezes joined a new party – the Force for Change Democratic Movement-Liberal Party. In the legislative election held on 3 March 2002, the Independent Democratic Action was the main party in the Uê Kédadji alliance, that won 16.2% of the popular vote and 8 out of 55 seats. It left this alliance and won in the 2006 election 11 out of 55 seats. In the July 2006 presidential election, its leader Patrice Trovoada ran as the only major opposition candidate, but he was defeated by Menezes.

Trovoada became Prime Minister in February 2008, but was defeated in a May 2008 vote of confidence proposed by the Movement for the Liberation of São Tomé and Príncipe/Social Democratic Party (MLSTP/PSD), and in June Menezes asked the MLSTP/PSD to form a new government. The ADI denounced Menezes' designation of the MLSTP/PSD to form a government as unconstitutional, arguing that it was too late in the parliamentary term to do so, and it took the matter to the Supreme Tribunal of Justice.

Evaristo Carvalho has been the President of São Tomé and Príncipe from 2016 to 2021, after defeating the incumbent President Manuel Pinto da Costa in the 2016 elections. President Carvalho was also Vice president of the ruling Independent Democratic Action party (ADI). Patrice Trovoada was Prime Minister from 2014 to 2018 as the leader of Independent Democratic Action party (ADI).

After ADI’s loss in the 2018 election, a dissident faction led by Agostinho Fernandes removed Trovoada from the leadership on 25 May 2019, an action affirmed by the Constitutional Court, but Fernandes’s leadership resigned on 10 July 2020 and Trovoada was regained recognition as leader in April 2022.

On 6 January 2025, president Carlos Vila Nova dismissed Prime Minister Patrice Trovoada and his government, citing Trovoada's prolonged absences and his government's failure to solve multiple issues. Trovoada responded calling his dismissal "illegal" and "unconstitutional". Vila Nova then selected then Minister of Justice, Ilza Amado Vaz, as prime minister. Vaz then resigned, stating in a letter that her continued leadership “would not contribute to the success of public policies and the harmonious and peaceful development.” Vila Nova thereafter picked Américo Ramos, who was not endorsed for the prime ministerial role by the ADI, being criticized for ignoring the majority of the National Assembly.

The collapse of Trovoada's government caused a leadership crisis within the ADI, creating a split between Trovoada’s faction and a faction led current Prime Minister Américo Ramos backed by Carlos Vila Nova. The Supreme Court of Justice declared that the president's firing of the cabinet was unconstitutional and outside the head of state's powers but it wouldn't have any retroactive effect rendering the decision meaningless. The majority of the parliament made up of ADI adopted a resolution to keep Ramos in power ahead of the presidential and parliamentary elections.

On 27 June 2026, the ADI held an extraordinary congress not recognized by Trovoada’s faction after which Ramos proclaimed himself the new leader of the ADI. On 21 July, a day after Vila Nova was announced to have been re-elected to the presidency, the Constitutional Court issued a ruling that affirmed the legitimacy of the congress and acknowledged Ramos as the rightful leader.

== Election results ==
=== Presidential elections ===
Year	Candidate	1st			2nd		
Year	Candidate	Votes	%	Rank	Votes	%	Rank
1996	Miguel Trovoada	15,334	41.40	1st	35,112	52.70	1st
2001	Fradique de Menezes	25,896	55.18	1st	-		
2006	Patrice Trovoada	22,339	38.80	2nd	-		
2011	Evaristo Carvalho	13,125	21.79	2nd	31,287	47.12	2nd
2016	Evaristo Carvalho	34,522	49.88	1st	42,058	100	1st
2021	Carlos Vila Nova	32,022	39.47	1st	45,481	57.54	1st
2026	Nito Abreu	23,457	41.46	2nd	-		

=== Legislative elections ===
Since 1994, the Independent Democratic Action party has had a parliamentary group.

Year	Results		Seats	Rank	Government
Year	Votes	%	Seats	Rank	Government
1994	6,660	26.27	14 / 55	2nd	Opposition
1998	8,222	28.30	16 / 55	2nd	Opposition
2002	6,398	16.20	5 / 55	3rd	Opposition (coalition Uê Kédadji)
2006	10,678	20.50	11 / 55	3rd	Opposition; Government majority Opposition
2010	29,588	43.13	26 / 55	1st	Government majority Opposition
2014	35,267	52.58	33 / 55	1st	Government majority
2018	32,805	41.81	25 / 55	1st	Opposition
2022	36,549	46.81	30 / 55	1st	Government majority
2026	18,061	36.33	23 / 55	2nd	TBD
