= Manuel Pinto da Costa =

President of São Tomé and Príncipe (1975–1991; 2011–2016)

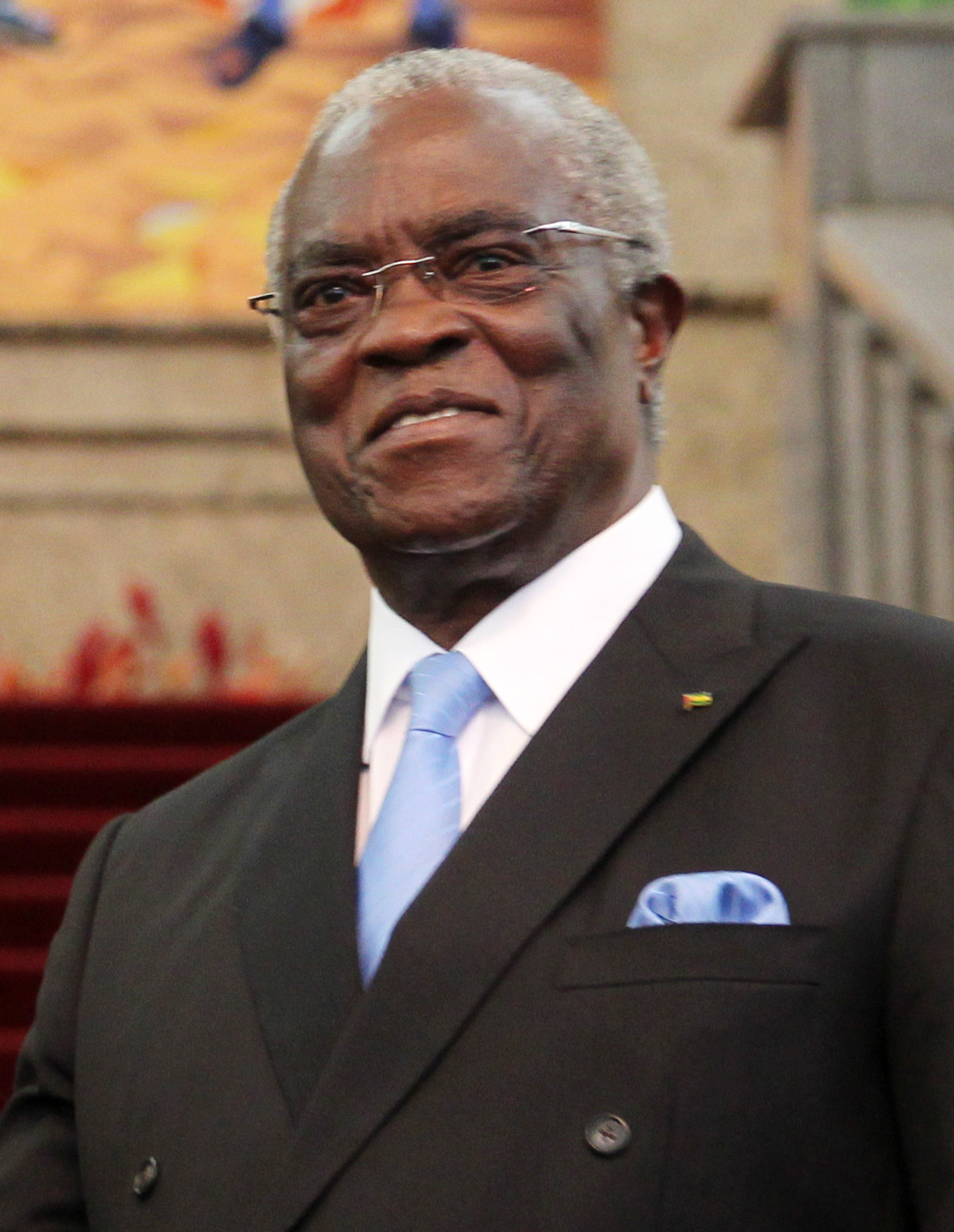
- Pinto da Costa in January 2014

1st President of São Tomé and Príncipe
- In office 3 September 2011 – 3 September 2016
- Prime Minister: Patrice Trovoada; Gabriel Costa; Patrice Trovoada
- Preceded by: Fradique de Menezes
- Succeeded by: Evaristo Carvalho
- In office 12 July 1975 – 4 March 1991
- Prime Minister: Miguel Trovoada; Celestino Rocha da Costa; Daniel Daio
- Preceded by: Position established
- Succeeded by: Leonel Mário d'Alva (acting)

President of MLSTP–PSD
- In office May 1998 – 27 February 2005
- Preceded by: New title (Note: Francisco Fortunato Pires previously led the party as Secretary-General)
- Succeeded by: Guilherme Posser da Costa

Secretary-General of MLSTP
- In office 12 June 1972 – October 1990
- Preceded by: António Tomás Medeiros
- Succeeded by: Carlos Graça (Note: As Secretary-General of MLSTP–PSD)

Personal details
- Born: 5 August 1937 (age 89) Água Grande, São Tomé and Príncipe
- Party: MLSTP/PSD (1975–2011); Independent (2011–present)
- Spouse: Maria Amelia Pinto da Costa

Manuel Pinto da Costa (born 5 August 1937) is a Santomean economist and politician who served as the first president of São Tomé and Príncipe from 1975 to 1991. He again served as president from 2011 to 2016.

== Life and career ==
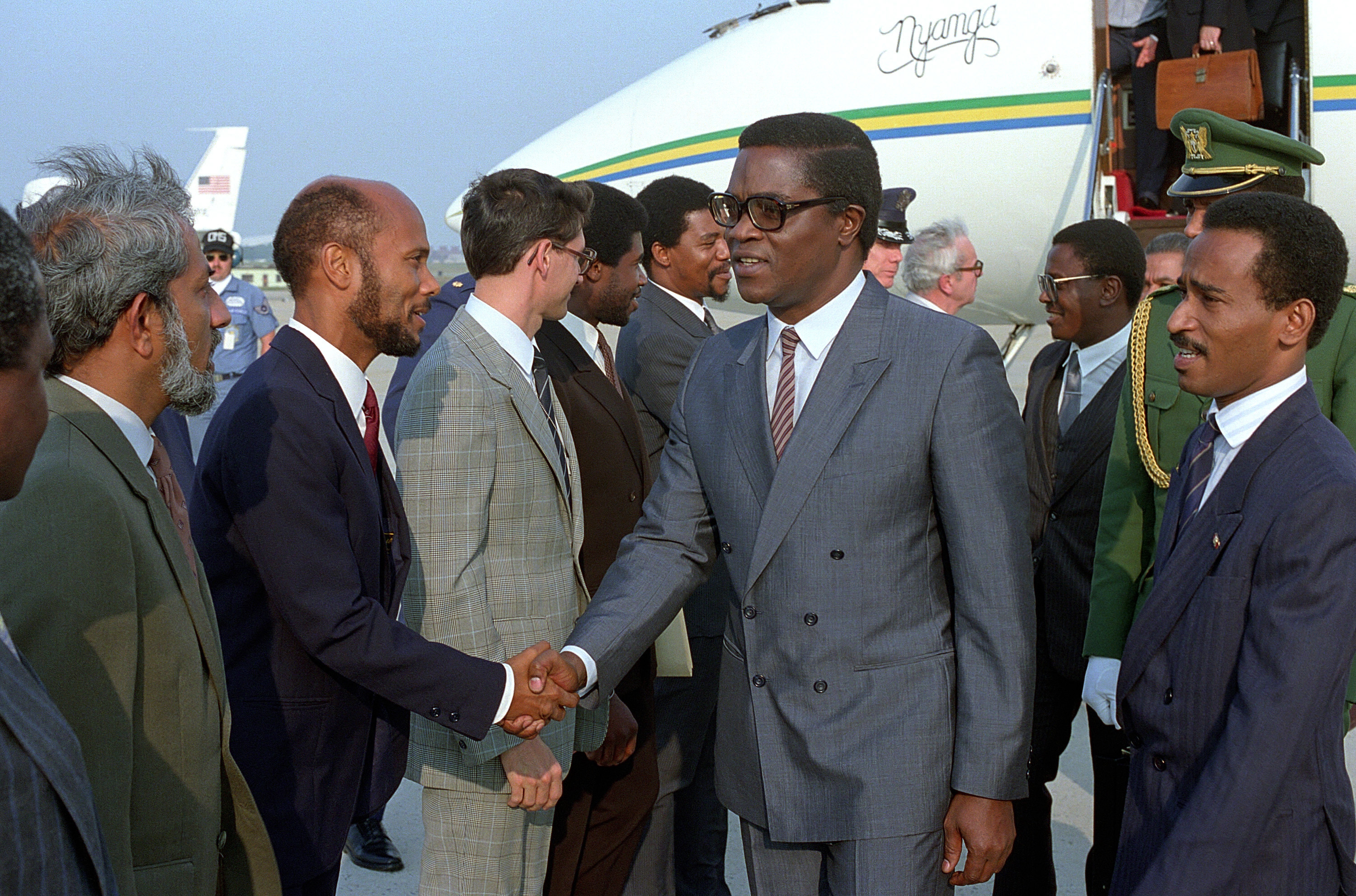
Pinto da Costa during a state visit to the United States in September 1986

Educated in East Germany, he is fluent in Portuguese and German. Until the early 1990s, the MLSTP maintained extensive relations with Angola and the MPLA, with Pinto da Costa himself having enjoyed a friendly relationship with José Eduardo dos Santos, the President of Angola, extending back to when they were both young men.

In 1991, the legalization of opposition political parties led to the country's first election under a democratic system. Pinto da Costa did not contest the election and instead announced he would retire from politics. The MLSTP did not present an alternative candidate, and Miguel Trovoada was elected unopposed. Despite his previous declaration, Pinto da Costa returned to contest elections in 1996, but was narrowly defeated, taking 47.26% of the vote, by Trovoada. In 2001, he ran against incumbent president Fradique de Menezes, who won a majority in the first round.

Pinto da Costa was elected leader of the MLSTP in May 1998. He resigned from the party in February 2005 and Guilherme Posser da Costa was elected to succeed him.

In the July 2011 presidential election, he ran as an independent. He won the most votes in the first round but failed to receive the required majority. In a run-off round on 7 August, he defeated rival Evaristo Carvalho from the Independent Democratic Action party (Portuguese: Acção Democratica Independente, ADI), taking 53% of the votes. During the campaign, he focused on the need for political stability and promised to tackle widespread corruption. His bid was given the backing of most of the other major candidates, including former Prime Minister Maria das Neves, who claimed "Pinto da Costa's plan could bring more hope to our country". Some analysts, however, raised concerns that the former president's victory might trigger a return to the authoritarian rule seen during his previous period in power. He took office on 3 September 2011.

In the 2016 election, he qualified for the second round, but then boycotted the second round, so he stepped down, and the opposition won.

== Notes ==
Political offices
New office	President of São Tomé and Príncipe; 1975–1991	Succeeded by Leonel Mário d'Alva; Acting
Preceded by Fradique de Menezes	President of São Tomé and Príncipe; 2011–2016	Succeeded by Evaristo Carvalho
