= Miguel Trovoada =

President of São Tomé and Príncipe from 1991 to 2001

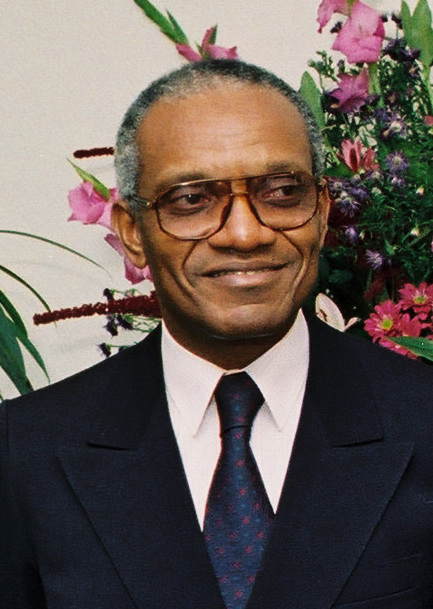
- Trovoada in 1995

2nd President of São Tomé and Príncipe
- In office 21 August 1995 – 3 September 2001
- Prime Minister: Carlos Graça; Armindo Vaz d'Almeida; Raul Bragança Neto; Guilherme Posser da Costa
- Preceded by: Manuel Quintas de Almeida (acting)
- Succeeded by: Fradique de Menezes
- In office 3 April 1991 – 15 August 1995
- Prime Minister: Daniel Daio; Norberto Costa Alegre; Evaristo Carvalho; Carlos Graça
- Preceded by: Leonel Mário d'Alva (acting)
- Succeeded by: Manuel Quintas de Almeida (acting)

1st Prime Minister of São Tomé and Príncipe
- In office 12 July 1975 – 9 April 1979
- President: Manuel Pinto da Costa
- Preceded by: Position established
- Succeeded by: Celestino Rocha da Costa

Personal details
- Born: 27 December 1936 (age 89) São Tomé, Overseas Province of São Tomé and Príncipe, Portugal
- Party: Independent Democratic Action
- Spouse: Maria Helena Trovoada
- Education: University of Lisbon

Miguel dos Anjos da Cunha Lisboa Trovoada (born 27 December 1936) is a São Toméan politician who was the first prime minister from 1975 to 1979 and second president of São Tomé and Príncipe from 1991 to 2001. On 16 July 2014, he was appointed the Special Representative of the United Nations Secretary-General and Head of the United Nations Integrated Peacebuilding Office in Guinea-Bissau (UNIOGBIS). Prior to this, he was the executive secretary of the Gulf of Guinea Commission.

== Background ==
Born in the city of São Tomé, Trovoada attended secondary school in Angola before studying law at the University of Lisbon in Portugal. In 1960 he cofounded, with former classmate Manuel Pinto da Costa, the Committee for the Liberation of São Tomé and Príncipe (CLSTP) – which was renamed the Movement for the Liberation of São Tomé and Príncipe in 1972. Operating out of its headquarters in Gabon, Trovoada served as the movement's foreign affairs director from 1961 to 1975 and was instrumental in gaining Organization of African Unity (OAU) recognition for the MLSTP in 1972.

After the fall of the Estado Novo regime in Portugal due to the Carnation Revolution, Trovoada served as the São Tomé and Príncipe first Prime Minister and Minister of Defence (12 July 1975 – March 1979). However, relations between the President and Prime Minister soon deteriorated, culminating in 1979 when President da Costa abolished the post of Prime Minister. Several months later, Trovoada was charged with plotting against the government. After being arrested and detained for 21 months, Trovoada went into exile in France. In May 1990, following the adoption of a democratic constitution, he returned to his country and campaigned for president.

In 1991, Trovoada was elected President in the country's first multiparty presidential election; he was re-elected in 1996. When he first ran for President, he was not a member of any political party, but by the end of his first term he had formed a new political party – Independent Democratic Action (ADI).

His government was briefly overthrown in a coup d'etat from 15 August 1995 to 21 August 1995.

President Trovoada's term ended on 3 September 2001 when Fradique de Menezes was sworn in as the new head of state.

Trovoada took office as executive secretary of the Gulf of Guinea Commission on 21 January 2009.

Miguel Trovoada's son Patrice Trovoada is also a politician and served as Prime Minister of São Tomé and Príncipe in 2008.

Government offices
Preceded by (–)	Foreign Minister of São Tomé and Príncipe; 1975	Succeeded by Leonel Mário d'Alva
Preceded by Leonel Mário d'Alva	Prime Minister of São Tomé and Príncipe; 1975–1979	Succeeded by Post Abolished
Preceded by Manuel Pinto da Costa	President of São Tomé and Príncipe; 1991–2001	Succeeded by Fradique de Menezes
