= Democratic Convergence Party (São Tomé and Príncipe) =

Political party in São Tomé and Príncipe

Democratic Convergence Party Partido de Convergência Democrática
- Leader: Danilson Cotu
- Founded: 4 November 1990
- Split from: MLSTP/PSD
- Ideology: Social market economy Conservatism; Economic liberalism
- Political position: Centre-right
- Colors: Green, yellow, white, black Blue, red, orange (until the 2000s)
- National Assembly: 0 / 55

Website
- pcd-stp.com

The Democratic Convergence Party-Reflection Group (Portuguese: Partido de Convergência Democrática-Grupo de Reflexão), or PCD-GR, is a political party in São Tomé and Príncipe. It was founded on 4 November 1990 by Movement for the Liberation of São Tomé and Príncipe (MLSTP) dissidents, independents, and young professionals. Leonel Mário d'Alva is the party leader.

The one-party period of São Tomé and Príncipe lasted from the country's independence in 1975 to 1991, when the dominant party, Movement for the Liberation of São Tomé and Príncipe – Social Democratic Party, lost in the first multiparty elections to the PCD-GR. The party won the 1991 parliamentary election and was the ruling party from 1991 to 1994. Since 1994 its power has declined, and it has maintained coalitions with other parties, first the MLSTP and then the Forces for Change Coalition of President Fradique de Menezes. It was led for several years by Alda Bandeira.

At the legislative elections, March 3, 2002, the party won together with the Force for Change Democratic Movement-Liberal Party (MDFM-PL) 39.4% of the popular vote and 23 out of 55 seats. The same alliance won at the legislative election, held on 26 March 2006, 36.79% and 23 out of 55 seats. The party supported incumbent Fradique de Menezes in the 30 July 2006 presidential election. He was re-elected with 60.58% of the vote.

In the 2011 São Toméan presidential election, Delfim Neves represented both the PCD and the Force for Change Democratic Movement – Liberal Party (MDFM-PL), the part of the previous president, Fradique de Menezes. He won 13.9% of the vote.

== See also ==
- Category:Democratic Convergence Party (São Tomé and Príncipe) politicians
