= National Assembly (São Tomé and Príncipe) =

Legislative body of São Tomé and Príncipe

Coordinates: 0°19′53″N 6°44′26″E

National Assembly of São Tomé and Príncipe Assembleia Nacional de São Tomé e Príncipe

Type
- Type: Unicameral

History
- Founded: 1975

Leadership
- President: Nilda Borges da Mata, ADI since 10 November 2026

Structure
- Seats: 55
- Political groups: Government (23): ADI (23); Confidence and supply (6): MCI–PS (6); Opposition (28): MLSTP–PSD (26); Basta (2)

Elections
- Voting system: Party-list proportional representation
- Last election: 27 September 2026

Meeting place
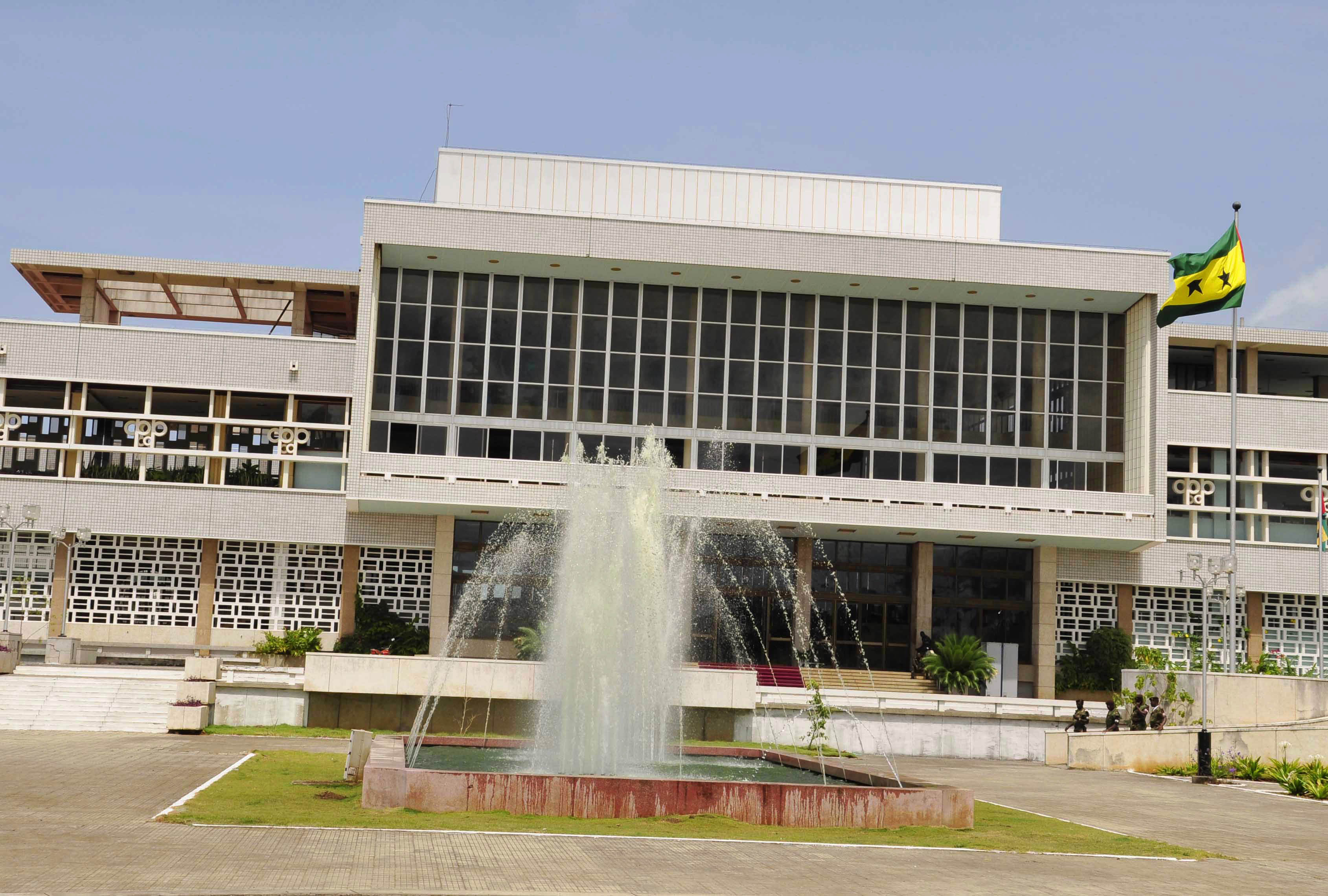
- Convention center, São Tomé

Website
- www.parlamento.st

The National Assembly (Portuguese: Assembleia Nacional) is the unicameral legislative body of the Democratic Republic of São Tomé and Príncipe.

The Assembly is elected for a four-year term. The Assembly can be dissolved by the President of the Republic in case of a serious institutional crisis, only with the approval of the Council of State, a consultative assembly composed of 12 members.

The National Assembly was founded in 1975, as a result of the adoption of the Constitution of São Tomé and Príncipe. From 1975 to 1990, the Assembly served as a highest organ of state power led by the Movement for the Liberation of São Tomé and Príncipe where, per the principle of unified power, all state organs had been subordinated to it. With the constitutional reforms of 1990, the country became a multi-party democracy and the first competitive elections were organised in 1991.

== Previous election results ==
Political Party	Election Year								
Political Party	1991	1994	1998	2002	2006	2010	2014	2018	2022
Movement for the Liberation of São Tomé and Príncipe-Social Democratic Party (MLSTP-PSD)	21	27	31	24	20	21	16	23	18
Independent Democratic Action (ADI)	–	14	16	*	11	26	33	25	30
Democratic Convergence Party (PCD)	33	14	8	23	23	7	5	5	2
Force for Change Democratic Movement-Liberal Party (MDFM-PL)	–	–	–	23	23	1	–	5	–
Union of Democrats for Citizenship and Development (UDCD)	–	–	–	–	–	–	1	5	–
Movement of Independent Citizens of São Tomé and Príncipe – Socialist Party (MCI-PS)	–	–	–	–	–	–	–	2	5
National Unity Party (PUN)	–	–	–	–	–	–	–	–	5
Opposition Democratic Coalition (CODO)	1	–	–	–	–	–	–	–	–
Uê Kédadji (UK)	–	–	–	8	–	–	–	–	–
New Way Movement (MNR)	–	–	–	–	1	–	–	–	–
Total	55	55	55	55	55	55	55	55	55

* The Independent Democratic Action (ADI) party was a member of the Uê Kédadji coalition in the 2002 election.

== List of presidents ==
Presidents of the Constituent Assembly (1975)
Term	Incumbent
1975	Nuno Xavier Daniel Dias
1975	Guilherme do Sacramento Neto
Presidents of the National Assembly (1975–present)
Term	Incumbent
1975–1980	Leonel Mário d'Alva
1980–1991	Alda Neves da Graça do Espírito Santo
1991–1994	Leonel Mário d'Alva
1994–2002	Francisco Fortunato Pires
2002–2006	Dionísio Tomé Dias
2006–2010	Francisco da Silva
2010	Arzemiro dos Prazeres
2010–2012	Evaristo Carvalho
2012–2014	Alcino Pinto
2014–2018	José da Graca Diogo
2018–2022	Delfim Neves
2022–2026	Celmira Sacramento
2026–present	Abnildo do Nascimento d'Oliveira

== See also ==
- History of São Tomé and Príncipe
- List of national legislatures
- Legislative Branch
