= Timeline of Portuguese São Tomé and Príncipe =

This is a timeline of Portuguese São Tomé and Príncipe from its discovery between mid-January 1469 to 1471 to independence on July 12, 1975. It includes the time when the island was under Dutch and French occupations and the separate colonies of São Tomé and Príncipe up to its unification in 1753.

== 15th century ==
- Between mid-January 1469 and 1471 – The first islands of São Tomé and Santo Antão (now Príncipe) were discovered by the explorers João de Santarém and Pêro Escobar
- 1493:
  - The first successful settlement of São Tomé was established by Álvaro Caminha
  - Torre do Capitão (Captain's Tower) built

== 16th century ==
- 1502 – The first successful settlement of Príncipe was established with a similar arrangement to São Tomé, it was named Santo António, it adopted the current island name
- 1515 – São Tomé and Príncipe had become slave depots for the coastal slave trade centered at Elmina Castle in modern-day Ghana
- 1520 – May 14: A total solar eclipse took place 75–80 miles (120–130 km) south of the island of São Tome, it was partial in the islands as the sky was almost dark
- 1522:
  - São Tomé and Príncipe were taken over and administered by the Portuguese crown
  - Vasco Estevens became captain of the island of São Tomé
- 1528 – May 18: A hybrid solar eclipse took place just south of the island of São Tome in the mid-morning hours, it was as an annular in the islands as the sky was almost dark
- 1531 – Henrique Pereira became captain of the island of São Tomé
- 1534 – The city of São Tomé became a bishopric through the Bull "Aequum reputamus" of Pope Paul IV, the diocese of Tomé (now São Tomé and Príncipe) was established, also the Our Lady of Grace church became a cathedral
- 1540 or 1550 – A ship carrying slaves from Angola to Brazil shipwrecked in the south of São Tomé
- 1541 – Diogo Botelho Pereira became captain of the island of São Tomé
- 1546 – Francisco de Barros de Paiva became captain of the island of São Tomé
- c. 1558 – Pedro Botelho became captain of the island of São Tomé
- 1560 – Cristóvão Dória de Sousa became captain of the island of São Tomé
- 1564 – Francisco de Gouveia became captain of the island of São Tomé
- 1566 – Fortim de São Jerónimo built on the island of São Tomé
- 1569 – Francisco de Paiva Teles became captain of the island of São Tomé
- 1571 – Diogo Salema became captain of the island of São Tomé
- 1573 – São Tomé and Príncipe were taken over and administered by the Portuguese crown for the second time
- 1575:
  - Fort São Sebastião near the town of São Tomé built
  - António Monteiro Maciel became captain of the island of São Tomé
- 1576–1578 – Our Lady of Grace Cathedral made renovation works
- c. 1584 – Francisco Fernandes de Figueiredo became captain of the island of São Tomé
- 1585 – The Habsburg Philippine Dynasty in power
- 1586 – Francisco Fernandes de Figueiredo became the first governor of the island of São Tomé
- 1587 – Miguel Teles de Moura became the second governor of the island of São Tomé
- 1591 – Duarte Peixoto da Silva became the third governor of the island of São Tomé
- 1592 – Francisco de Vila Nova becomes acting governor of the island of São Tomé
- 1593 – Fernandes de Meneses becomes the fourth governor of the island of São Tomé
- 1595 – 9 July: Rei Amador and most of the slaves took part in the Angolar revolt, they marched into the capital and were subjugated a year later
- 1596 – 4 January: Rei Amador captured and later imprisoned and executed for his slave rebellion
- 1597 – Vasco de Carvalho becomes the fifth governor of the island of São Tomé
- 1598
  - August – First Dutch occupation of the island
  - October – First Dutch occupation ends, archipelago returned to Portuguese rule
  - João Barbosa da Cunha became acting governor of the island of São Tomé for Vasco de Carvalho
- 1599 – The island of São Tomé taken by Laurens Bicker and his troops and was briefly ruled by the Dutch

== 17th century ==
- 1601:
  - António Maciel Monteiro became acting governor of the island of São Tomé Island for Vasco de Carvalho
  - Vasco de Carvalho de Sousa was 1st governor of the island of Príncipe
  - Jan 4: An annular solar eclipse took place southeast of the island of São Tome, it was as partial in the islands as the sky was almost dark
- 1604 – Rui de Sousa de Alarcão was 2nd governor of the island of Príncipe
- 1609 :
  - D. Fernando de Noronha was the last governor of the islands of São Tomé and Príncipe
  - João Barbosa da Cunha no longer acting governor of the island of São Tomé
  - Constantino Tavares was the 8th governor of the island of São Tomé
- 1611:
  - João Barbosa da Cunha was again acting governor of the island of São Tomé, this time for Constantino Tavares
  - Francisco Teles de Mendes was the 9th governor of the island of São Tomé
  - Luís Dias de Abreu was the 10th governor of the island of São Tomé
- 1613 – Feliciano Carvalho was the 11th governor of the island of São Tomé
- 1614 – Luís Dias de Abreu was the 12th governor of the island of São Tomé and served his second term
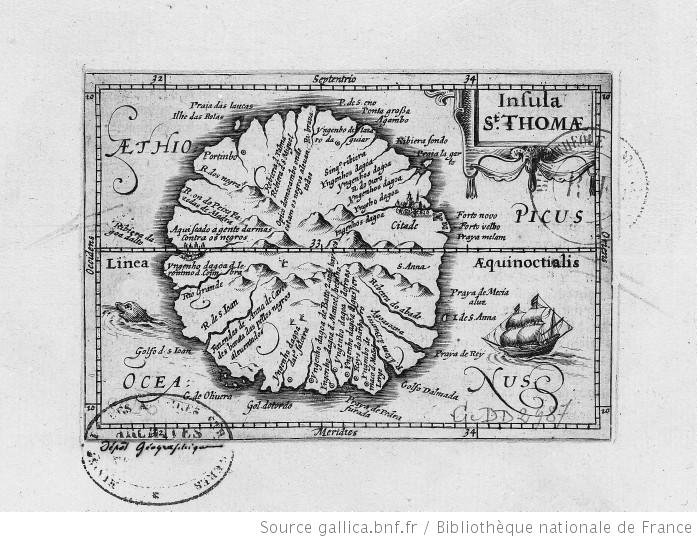
  1616 map of the island of São Tomé
- 1616 – Miguel Correia Baharem was the 13th governor of the island of São Tomé
- 1619 – July 11: A total solar eclipse took place in the north of the island of São Tome and all of Príncipe, the path were inside and the sky was dark, it was as partial in the south and the sky was almost dark
- 1620 – Pedro da Cunha was the 14th governor of the island of São Tomé
- 1621 – Félix Pereira was the 15th governor of the island of São Tomé
- 1623 – Jerónimo de Melo Fernando was the 16th governor of the island of São Tomé
- 1627 – André Gonçalves Maracote was the 17th governor of the island of São Tomé
- 1628 – Lourenço Pires de Távora was the acting governor of the island of São Tomé for André Gonçalves Maracote
- 1632:
  - Francisco Barreto de Meneses was the 18th governor of the island of São Tomé
  - Lourenço Pires de Távora was again the acting governor of the island of São Tomé, this time for Francisco Barreto de Meneses
- 1636:
  - António de Carvalho was the 19th governor of the island of São Tomé
  - Lourenço Pires de Távora was again the acting governor of the island of São Tomé, this time for António de Carvalho
- 1640 :
  - Manuel Quaresma Carneiro became the 20th governor of the island of São Tomé
  - Miguel Pereira de Melo e Albuquerque became the acting governor of the island of São Tomé for Manuel Quaresma Carneiro
- 1641:
  - October 3: Start of the Dutch occupation of the archipelago led by Cornelius Jol
  - Paulo da Ponte became acting governor of the island of São Tomé for Manuel Quaresma Carneiro
  - October 31: Cornelis Jol died of malaria
- 1642 – Lourenço Pires de Távora became the 21st governor of the island of São Tomé up to 1650
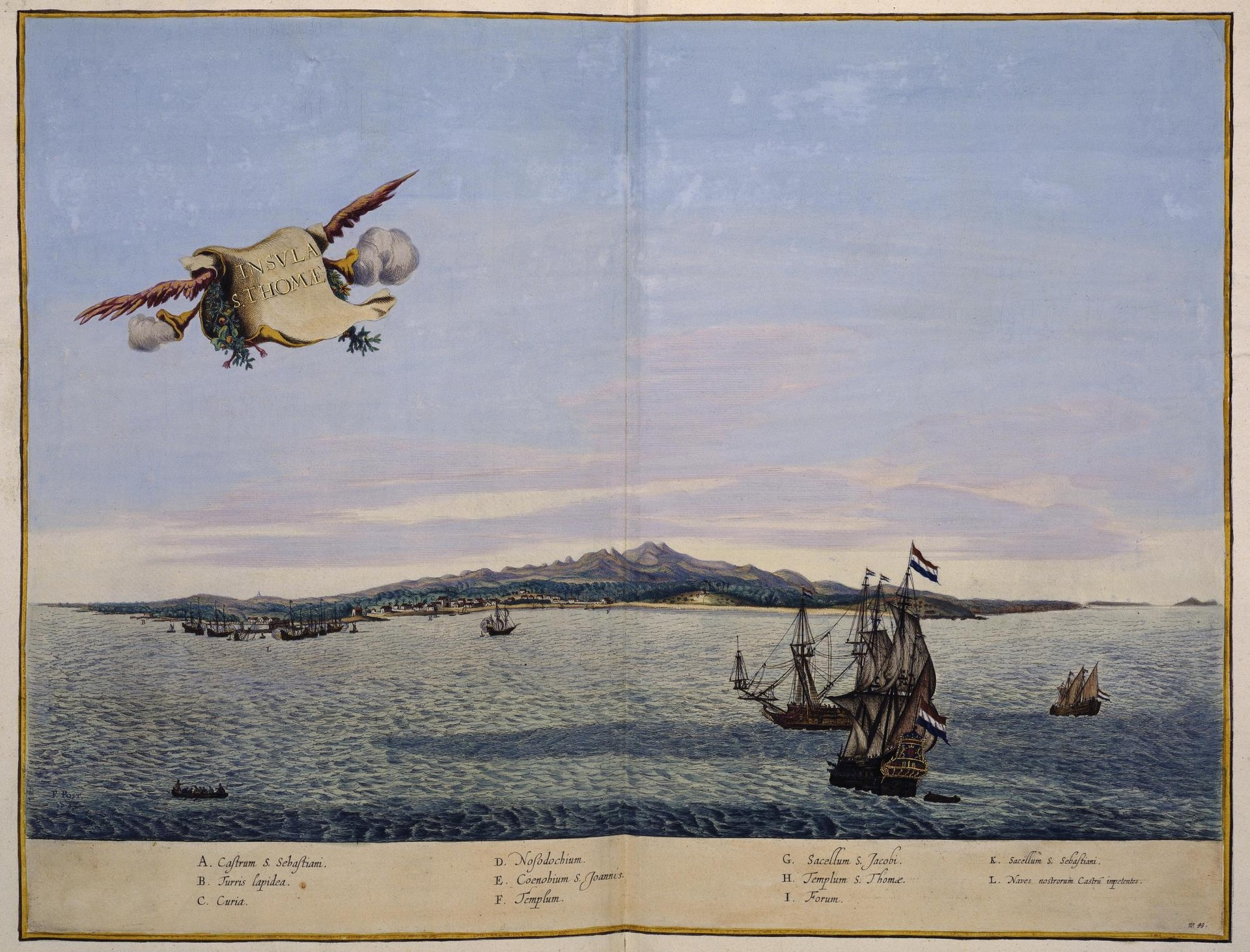
  Island of São Tomé (Saint Thomas) in 1645
- 1648 – the Dutch were expelled from the archipelago, continuation of Portuguese rule
- 1656 – Cristovão de Barros do Rěgo became governor of the island of São Tomé to the mid 1660s
- 1661 – Pedro da Silva became governor of the island of São Tomé
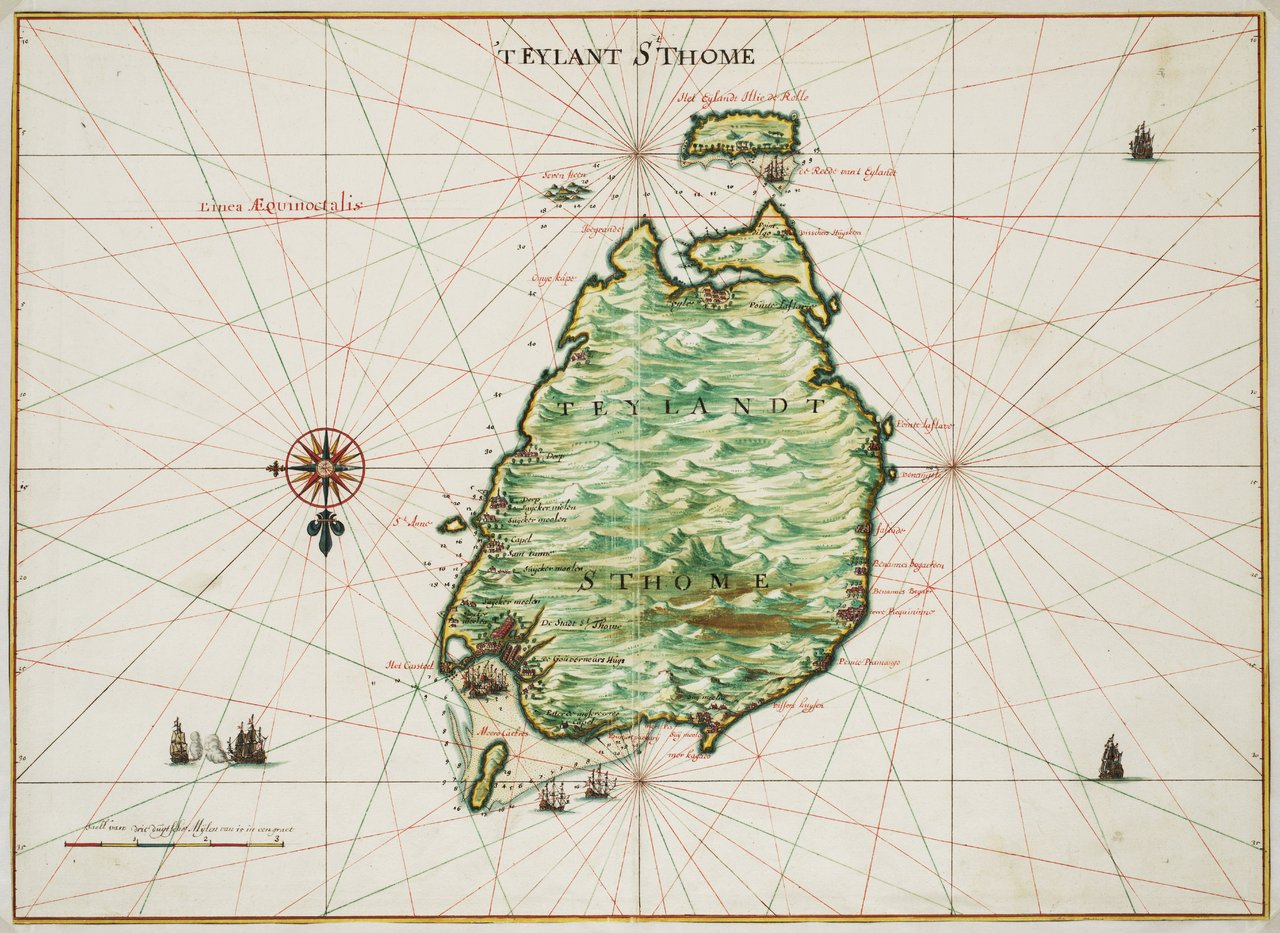
  Map of São Tomé by Johannes Vingboons (1665).
- 1663 – the Dutch captured a part of the island and Admiral de Ruyter and built a small fort (now Forte Pequeno), the Dutch were later kicked out by the Portuguese
- 1669 – Paulo Ferreira de Noronha became governor of the island of São Tomé
- 1671 – Chamber Senate begins in the island of São Tomé
- 1673 – Chamber Senate ends and Julião dos Campos Barreto became governor of the island of São Tomé
- 1676 – December 5: A total solar eclipse took place only in and within the island of São Tome during mid-morning, the island and its surroundings were inside the path and the sky was dark
- 1677 – Bernardim Freire de Andrade became acting governor of the island of São Tomé for Julião dos Campos Barreto
- 1680 – Jacinto de Figueiredo e Abreu became governor of the island of São Tomé
- 1683 – João Álvares da Cunha became acting governor for Jacinto de Figueredo e Abreu
- 1686:
  - António Pereira de Brito Lemos became governor of the island of São Tomé
  - Later in the year, Bento de Sousa Lima became governor of the island of São Tomé
- 1689 – António Pereira de Lacerda became governor of the island of São Tomé
- 1693 – António de Barredo became governor of the island of São Tomé
- 1695:
  - José Pereira Sodré became governor of the island of São Tomé
  - Príncipe's fortress, the Fortaleza de Santo António da Ponta da Mina built northeast of Santo Antònio
- 1696 – João da Costa Matos became governor of the island of São Tomé
- 1697 – Manuel António Pinheiro da Câmara became governor of the island of São Tomé

== 18th century ==
- 1702 – José Correia de Castro became governor of the island of São Tomé
- 1709:
  - Vicente Dinis Pinheiro became governor of the island of São Tomé
  - Príncipe invaded by the French as part of the wider War of the Spanish Succession, later all of the archipelago was under French rule and a junta was established
- 1715 – End of French rule in the archipelago, Portuguese rule restored
  - Bartolomeu da Costa Ponte became governor of the island of São Tomé
- 1716 – October 15: An annular solar eclipse took place 60–75 miles (100–120 km) southwest of the island of São Tome, it was partial in the islands as the sky was almost dark even inside its path
- 1719 – The city of Santo António and its fortress was attacked and destroyed by the English pirate Bartholomew Roberts, nicknamed "John Roberts" and "Black Bart" in revenge of the death of his captain Howell Davis.
- 1720 – Start of the Portuguese junta in São Tomé
- 1722 – End of the Portuguese junta in the island of São Tomé, José Pinheiro da Câmara became governor
- 1727 – Serafin Teixeira Sarmento became governor of the island of São Tomé
- 1734 – Lopo de Sousa Coutinho became governor of the island of São Tomé
- 1736 – José Caetano Soto Maior became governor of the island of São Tomé
- 1741:
  - António Ferrão de Castelo Branco became governor of the island of São Tomé
  - Later in the year, another Chamber Senate occurred on the island of São Tomé
- 1744:
  - Francisco Luís da Conceição became acting governor of the island of São Tomé for Francisco Luís de Conceição
  - Later in the year, Francisco de Alva Brandão became governor of the island of São Tomé
- 1747 – Francisco Luís das Chagas became governor of the island of São Tomé
- 1748 – Another Chamber Senate occurred on the island of São Tomé
- 1749 – July 14: A total solar eclipse took place between 65–70 miles (105–120 km) southwest of the island of São Tome, it was as partial in the islands as the sky was almost dark
- 1751:
  - António Rodriques Neves became the last governor of the island of São Tomé
  - Another Chamber Senate occurred in the island of São Tomé
- 1753
  - The crown colony became united as São Tomé and Príncipe
  - The colonial capital moved to Santo António on the island of Príncipe
  - The Chamber Senate occurred in the archipelago
- 1755:
  - Lopo de Sousa Coutinho became the 1st governor of Portuguese São Tomé and Príncipe
  - The 2nd Chamber Senate occurred in the archipelago
- 1757 – The diocese seat moved to Santo António on the island of Príncipe
- 1758 – Luís Henrique da Mota e Mele became the 2nd governor of Portuguese São Tomé and Príncipe
- 1761 – The 3rd Chamber Senate occurred in the archipelago
- 1767 – Lourenço Lôbo de Almeida Palha became the 3rd governor of Portuguese São Tomé and Príncipe
- 1768 – The 4th Chamber Senate occurred in the archipelago
- 1770 – Vicente Gomes Ferreira became the 4th governor of Portuguese São Tomé and Príncipe
- 1778 – João Manuel de Azambuja became the 5th governor of Portuguese São Tomé and Príncipe
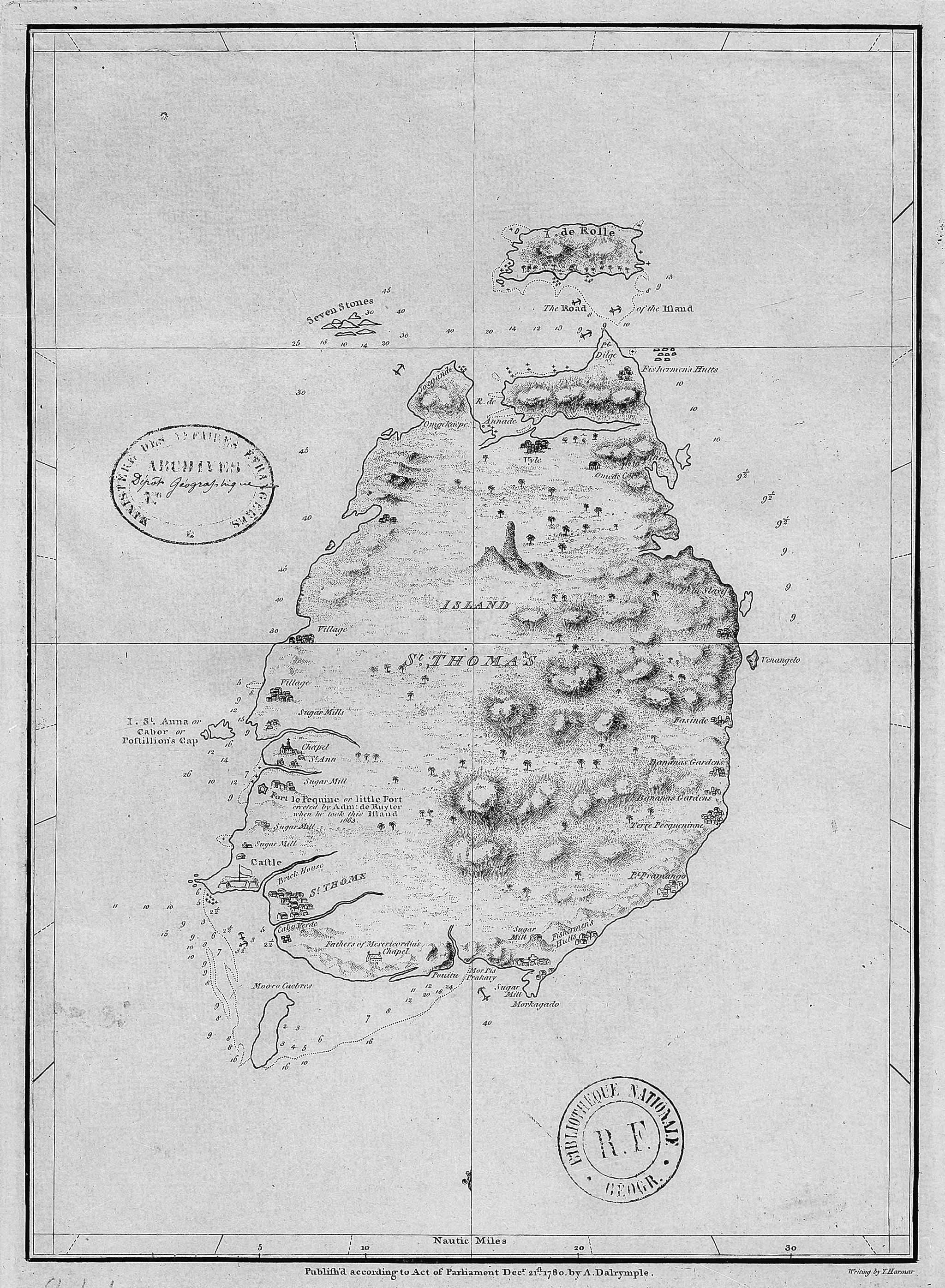
  Map of the island of São Tomé, 1780
- 1782 – Cristóvão Xavier de Sá became the 6th governor of Portuguese São Tomé and Príncipe
- 1784 – The front part of Our Lady of Grace Cathedral in São Tomé was in ruins
- 1785 – February 9: A total solar eclipse took place with the umbral shadow 30–40 miles (50–60 km) southeast of the island of São Tome, it was as partial in the islands as the sky was almost dark
- 1788 – João Resende Tavares Leote became the 7th governor of Portuguese São Tomé and Príncipe
- 1797:
  - Inácio Francisco de Nóbrega Sousa Coutinho became the 8th governor of Portuguese São Tomé and Príncipe
  - Later, Manuel Monteiro de Carvalho became acting governor of Portuguese São Tomé and Príncipe for Inácio Francisco de Nóbrega Sousa Coutinho
  - Varela Borca became the 9th governor of Portuguese São Tomé and Príncipe
- 1798 – Manuel Francisco Jiaquim da Mota became the 10th governor of Portuguese São Tomé and Príncipe
- 1799:
  - Francisco Rafael de Castelo de Vide became the 11th governor of Portuguese São Tomé and Príncipe
  - Later, João Baptista de Silva became the 12th governor of Portuguese São Tomé and Príncipe

== 19th century ==
- 1802 – Gabriel António Franco de Castro became the 13th governor of Portuguese São Tomé and Príncipe
- 1805 – Luís Joaquim Lisboa became the 14th governor of Portuguese São Tomé and Príncipe
- 1814:
  - January 21: A total solar eclipse took place in the islands of the São Tome and Príncipe, as it was inside the umbral path, the sky was almost dark
  - Our Lady of Grace Cathedral was restored again at the initiative of the local population
- 1817 – Filipe de Freitas became the 15th governor of Portuguese São Tomé and Príncipe
- 1824 – João Maria Xavier de Brito became the 16th governor of Portuguese São Tomé and Príncipe
- 1825 – Last of the copper coins were minted for the Santomean real for Portuguese São Tomé and Príncipe
- 1828 – 14 April: A hybrid solar eclipse took place in the islands of the São Tome and Príncipe, the umbral path included the north of São Tomé Island and was shown as an annular and the sky was almost dark
- 1830 – Joaquim Bento da Fonseca became the 17th governor of Portuguese São Tomé and Príncipe
- 1834 – A provisional government occurred in Portuguese São Tomé and Príncipe along with the Portuguese Empire as a result of the Portuguese Wars of Liberation
- 1835 – 20 November: A total solar eclipse took place in the islands of the São Tome and Príncipe, the umbral path included the São Tomé Island and its surroundings and the sky was dark
- 1836 – Fernando Correia Henriques de Noronha became acting governor of Portuguese São Tomé and Príncipe for Joaquim Bento da Fonseca
- 1837 – Leandro José da Costa became the 18th governor of Portuguese São Tomé and Príncipe
- 1838 – José Joaquim de Urbanski became the 19th governor of Portuguese São Tomé and Príncipe
- 1839 – Bernado José de Sousa Soares de Andréa became the 20th governor of Portuguese São Tomé and Príncipe
- 1842 – 22 January: The Diocese exclusively included São Tomé and Príncipe, it was not called under the name but Tomé
- 1843:
  - 5 February – Leandro José da Costa became the 21st governor of Portuguese São Tomé and Príncipeand served his second term
  - 2 March – José Maria Marquěs became the 22nd governor of Portuguese São Tomé and Príncipe
- 1846 – 1 May: The 3rd Chamber Senate took place
- 1847:
  - 30 September – Carlos Augusto de Morais e Almeida became the 23rd governor of Portuguese São Tomé and Príncipe
  - 20 November – The 4th Chamber Senate took place
- 1848
  - Benga king Bonkoro II from the island of Corisco (today, a part of Equatorial Guinea) moved to the island after rivalries with Munga I who succeeded him
  - 20 July: José Caetano René Vimont Pessoa became the 24th governor of Portuguese São Tomé and Príncipe
- 1849 – 12 December: Leandro José da Costa became the 25th governor of Portuguese São Tomé and Príncipe and served his third term
- 1851 – 9 March: José Maria Marquěs became the 26th governor of Portuguese São Tomé and Príncipe and served his second term
- 1852 – The town of São Tomé (now city) was again colonial capital
- 1853 – 20 March: Francisco José da Pina Rolo became the 27th governor of Portuguese São Tomé and Príncipe
- 1855 – 28 July: Adriano Maria Passaláqua became the 28th governor of Portuguese São Tomé and Príncipe
- 1857 – 21 March: The 5th Chamber Senate took place
- 1858:
  - 15 January: Francisco António Correia became the 29th governor of Portuguese São Tomé and Príncipe
  - 29 May: The 6th Chamber Senate took place
- 1859 – Luís José Pereira e Horta became the 30th governor of Portuguese São Tomé and Príncipe
- 1860 – 21 November: José Pedro de Melo became the 31st governor of Portuguese São Tomé and Príncipe
- 1862:
  - 8 July: The 7th Chamber Senate took place
  - 17 November – José Eduardo da Costa Moura became the 32nd governor of Portuguese São Tomé and Príncipe
- 1863 – 30 March: João Baptista Brunachy became the 33rd governor of Portuguese São Tomé and Príncipe
- 1864 – 8 January: Estanislau Xavier de Assunção e Almeida became the 34th governor of Portuguese São Tomé and Príncipe
- 1865:
  - John Gerrard Keulemans was the first Dutch ornithologists who visited Príncipe in 1865, he made observations of the bird species including grey parrot Psittacus erythracus
  - 2 August João Baptista Brunachy became the 35th governor of Portuguese São Tomé and Príncipe and served his second term
- 1867:
  - 30 July: António Joaquim da Fonseca became the 36th governor of Portuguese São Tomé and Príncipe
  - 30 September: Estanislau Xavier de Assunção e Almeida became the 37th governor of Portuguese São Tomé and Príncipe and served his second term
- 1868 – Banco Nacional Ultramarino opened its branch in the island of São Tomé, it existed until 1975
- 1869 – 30 May: Pedro Carlos de Aguiar Craveiro Lopes became the 38th governor of Portuguese São Tomé and Príncipe
- 1872 – 7 October: João Clímaco de Carvalho became the 39th governor of Portuguese São Tomé and Príncipe
- 1873 – 28 October: Gregório José Ribeiro became the 40th governor of Portuguese São Tomé and Príncipe
- 1876:
  - Portugal officially abolished slavery in 1876 and it included São Tomé and Príncipe
  - 1 November: Estanislau Xavier de Assunção e Almeida became the 41st governor of Portuguese São Tomé and Príncipe and served his third term
- 1879:
  - 28 September – Francisco Joaquim Ferreira do Amaral became the 42nd governor of Portuguese São Tomé and Príncipe
  - 28 November: Custódio Miguel de Borga became acting governor of Portuguese São Tomé and Príncipe for Francisco Joaquim Ferreira do Amaral
- 1880 – 3 January: Vicente Pinheiro Lôbo became the 43rd governor of Portuguese São Tomé and Príncipe
- 1881 – 30 December: Augusto Maria Leão became acting governor of Portuguese São Tomé and Príncipe for Vicente Pinheiro Lôbo
- 1882 – 26 January: Francisco Teixeira da Silva became the 44th governor of Portuguese São Tomé and Príncipe
- 1884 – 24 May: Custódio Miguel de Borga became the 45th governor of Portuguese São Tomé and Príncipe
- 1885 – The early São Sebastião Lighthouse in the island of São Tomé built
- 1886 – 25 August: Augusto Céar Rodrigues Sarmento became the 46th governor of Portuguese São Tomé and Príncipe
- 1890:
  - Ilhéu das Cabras lighthouse built north of the island of São Tomé
  - 9 March: Firmino José da Costa became the 47th governor of Portuguese São Tomé and Príncipe
- 1891 – 26 June: Francisco Eugénio Pereira de Miranda became acting governor of Portuguese São Tomé and Príncipe for Firmino José da Costa
- 1894 – 8 December: Jaime Lobo Brito Godins became the 48th governor of Portuguese São Tomé and Príncipe
- 1895 – 8 April: Cipriano Leite Pereira Jardim became the 49th governor of Portuguese São Tomé and Príncipe
- 1897:
  - Banknotes were issued for Portuguese São Tomé and Príncipe
  - 5 April: Joaquim da Graça Correia e Lança became the 50th governor of Portuguese São Tomé and Príncipe
- 1899 – 5 April: Amâncio de Alpoim Cerqueira Borges Cabral became the 52nd governor of Portuguese São Tomé and Príncipe

== 20th century ==
- 1901:
  - 3 January: Francisco Maria Peixoto Vieira became acting governor of Portuguese São Tomé and Príncipe for Amâncio de Alpoim Cerqueira Borges Cabral
  - 8 May: Joaquim Xavier de Brito became the 53rd governor of Portuguese São Tomé and Príncipe
- 1902 – 8 October: João Abel Antunes Mesquita Guimarães became the 54th governor of São Tomé and Príncipe
- 1903:
  - 7 June: João Gregório Duarte Ferreira became acting governor of Portuguese São Tomé and Príncipe for João Abel Antunes Mesquita Guimarães
  - 14 December: Francisco de Paula Cid became the 55th governor of Portuguese São Tomé and Príncipe
- 1907:
  - 13 April: Vítor Augusto Chaves Lemos e Melo was acting governor of Portuguese São Tomé and Príncipe for Francisco de Paula Cid
  - 24 June: Pedro Berquó became the 56th governor of Portuguese São Tomé and Príncipe
- 1908:
  - São Tomé had become the world's largest producer of cocoa for a few decades
  - 24 October: Vítor Augusto Chaves Lemos e Melo was again acting governor of Portuguese São Tomé and Príncipe, this time for Pedro Berquó
- 1909:
  - 50,000 réis notes were added by the BNU
  - 13 March: José Augusto Vieira da Fonseca became the 57th governor of Portuguese São Tomé and Príncipe
- 1910:
  - The Chief Expedition of the German Central African Expedition stopped by the island at Sāo Tomé then left for the Congo
  - The German Central African Expedition led by Schultze and Midbraed stopped by the island at São Tomé, the left for Annobón and the Congo
  - 13 June: Jaime Daniel Leote de Rego became the 58th governor of Portuguese São Tomé and Príncipe
  - 7 August: Fernando Augusto de Carvalho became the 59th governor of Portuguese São Tomé and Príncipe
  - 12 November: Carlos de Mendonça Pimentel became acting governor of Portuguese São Tomé and Príncipe for Fernando Augusto de Carvalho
  - 28 November: António Pinto Miranda Guedes became the 60th governor of Portuguese São Tomé and Príncipe
- 1911:
  - 14 June: Jaime Daniel Leote do Rego became the 61st governor of Portuguese São Tomé and Príncipe and served his second term
  - 24 December: Mariano Martins became the 62nd governor of Portuguese São Tomé and Príncipe
- 1913 – 13 May: Pedro do Amaral Boto Machado became the 63rd governor of Portuguese São Tomé and Príncipe
- 1914 – Its own real (as with the rest of the Portuguese Empire) was replaced with the São Tomé and Príncipe escudo
- 1915:
  - Aviator Gago Coutinho, officer of the Portuguese Navy, navigator and historian, began his geodesic mission to São Tomé
  - 6 February: Sporting Clube do Príncipe football (soccer) club established
  - 31 May: José Dionísio Carneiro de Sousa e Faro became the 64th governor of Portuguese São Tomé and Príncipe
  - 6 June: Rafael dos Santos Oliveira became acting governor of Portuguese São Tomé and Príncipe for José Dionísio Carneiro de Sousa e Faro
- 1918:
  - Aviator Gago Coutinho ended his geodesic mission to São Tomé
  - 28 July: João Gregório Duarte Ferreira became the 65th governor of Portuguese São Tomé and Príncipe
- 1919:
  - Gago Coutinho proved that Ilhéu das Rolas is crossed by the equatorial line. The resulting map was published in 1919, together with the Report of the Geodetic Mission on São Tomé Island 1915–1918, that was officially considered the first complete work of practical geodesy in the Portuguese colonies.
  - May 29: A total solar eclipse took place with its umbral portion the island of Príncipe, there it was the site where Einstein's Theory of Relativity was experimentally corroborated by Arthur Stanley Eddington and his team, the remainder was visible as partial
  - June 11: Avelino Augusto de Oliveira Leite became the 66th governor of Portuguese São Tomé and Príncipe
- 1920:
  - 25 September: José Augusto de Conceição Alves Veléz became acting governor of Portuguese São Tomé and Príncipe for Avelino Augusto de Oliveira Leite
  - 22 October: Eduardo Nogueira de Lemos became acting governor of Portuguese São Tomé and Príncipe for Avelino Augusto de Oliveira Leite
- 1921 – 2 July: António José Pereira became the 67th governor of Portuguese São Tomé and Príncipe
- 1924:
  - The Diocese of Tomé was renamed to the Diocese of São Tomé
  - 23 January: Eugénio de Barros Soares Branco became the 68th governor of Portuguese São Tomé and Príncipe
- 1926 – 8 July: José Duarte Junqueira Rato became the 69th governor of Portuguese São Tomé and Príncipe
- 1928:
  - São Sebastião Lighthouse built in São Tomé at the fort
  - 31 August – Sebastião José Barbosa became acting governor of Portuguese São Tomé and Príncipe for José Duarte Junqueira Rato
- 1929:
  - Ilhéu das Rolas lighthouse built
  - Coins for the Santomean escudo were issued for the colony
  - 30 January Francisco Penteado became the 70th governor of Portuguese São Tomé and Príncipe
  - 31 August – Luís Augusto Vieira Fernandes became the 71st governor of Portuguese São Tomé and Príncipe
  - November 1: An annular solar eclipse took place in the islands of the São Tome and Príncipe, the umbral path included a small part of Príncipe at the area of the southernmost part, a part of Neves Ferreira and the islets to the south the sky was almost dark
- 1931 – Andorinha Sport Club of the island of São Tomé established
- 1933 – 17 December: Ricardo Vaz Monteiro became the 72nd governor of Portuguese São Tomé and Príncipe
- c. 1935 – São Tome Football Association (now as São Tomé and Príncipe (or Santomean) Football Federation) founded
- 1941 – 8 May: Amadeu Gomes de Figueiredo became the 73rd governor of Portuguese São Tomé and Príncipe
- 1945 – 5 April: Carlos de Sousa Gorgulho became the 74th governor of Portuguese São Tomé and Príncipe
- 1948 – July: Afonso Manuel Machade de Sousa became acting governor of Portuguese São Tomé and Príncipe for Carlos de Sousa Gorgulho
- 1950 – 8 October: Mário José Cabral Oliveira Castro became acting governor of Portuguese São Tomé and Príncipe for Carlos de Sousa Gorgulho
- 1951:
  - 11 June: São Tomé and Príncipe became an overseas province
  - September 1: An annular solar eclipse took place in the islands of the São Tome and Príncipe, the umbral path included the southwesternmost of São Tomé Island and the sky was almost dark
- 1952:
  - 28 June: Guilherme António Amaral Abranches Pinto became acting governor of São Tomé and Príncipe for Carlos de Sousa Gorgulho
  - 21 September: Colégio-Liceu de São Tomé (São Tomé College-Lyceum) established, today it is known as Patrice Lumumba Preparatory School
- 1953:
  - 18 April: Fernaodo Augusto Rodrigues became acting governor of São Tomé and Príncipe for Carlos de Sousa Gorgulho
  - 19 May: Afonso Manuel Machado de Sousa became acting governor of São Tomé and Príncipe for Carlos de Sousa Gorgulho
  - July: Francisco António Pires Barata became the 75th governor of São Tomé and Príncipe
- 1954:
  - Renovation of the Colonial Office (now the Presidential Palace of São Tomé e Príncipe)
  - August: Luís de Câmara Leme Faria became acting governor of São Tomé and Príncipe for Francisco António Pires Barata
- 1955 – 15 June: José Machado became acting governor of São Tomé and Príncipe for Francisco António Pires Barata
- 1956:
  - Last modification of Our Lady of Grace Cathedral
  - 5 December: Octávio Ferreira Gonçalves became acting governor of São Tomé and Príncipe for Francisco António Pires Barata
- 1957:
  - The Diocese of São Tomé became the Diocese of São Tomé and Príncipe
  - 13 October: Manuel Marques de Abrantes Amaral became the 76th governor of São Tomé and Príncipe
- 1959 – Leoninos band established
- 1960 – Committee for the Liberation of São Tomé and Príncipe (now the Movement for the Liberation of São Tomé and Príncipe/Social Democratic Party), a nationalist group was established
- 1962 – 22 November: Douglas C-54D-10-DC 7502 of the Portuguese Air Force crashed shortly after take-off for Portela Airport, Lisbon, Portugal, killing 22 of the 37 people on board.
- 1963:
  - August: Alberto Monteiro de Sousa Campos became the last acting governor of São Tomé and Príncipe and was for Manuel Marques de Abrantes Amaral
  - 30 October: António Jorge da Silva Sebastião became the 77th governor of São Tomé and Príncipe
- 1964
  - Santo António do Príncipe Lighthouse built
  - 13 February: São Tomé Provincial (now Regional) Football Association founded
- 1968 – Príncipe Airport opened
- 1969 – 6 October: Escola Técnica Silva e Cunha, today, the National Lyceum opened
- 1972:
  - Post as governor of São Tomé and Príncipe briefly vacant
  - 18 June: Inter Bom-Bom football (soccer) club established
- 1973:
  - João Cecilio Gonçalces became the 78th governor of São Tomé and Príncipe
  - March: The legislative elections took place
- 1974
  - April 25: the Carnation Revolution took place in Portugal, the Estado Novo regime collapsed, São Tomé and Príncipe became self-governed
  - 29 July António Elísio Capelo Pires Veloso became the 79th and last governor of São Tomé and Príncipe
  - 18 December – São Tomé and Príncipe became an autonomous province with António Elísio Capelo Pires Veloso as its only high commissioner
  - 21 December: Leonel Mário d'Alva became the first Prime Minister of São Tomé and Príncipe and the only one before independence
- 1975 – July 12: São Tomé and Príncipe became an independent country and Portuguese São Tomé and Príncipe dissolved, the last Portuguese territory in Africa to do so.

== See also ==
- Portuguese Empire
- Portuguese São Tomé and Príncipe
- History of São Tomé and Príncipe

== Bibliography ==
- Izequiel Batista de Sousa, São Tomé et Principe de 1485 à 1755 : une société coloniale : du Blanc au Noir, L'Harmattan, Paris, 2008 ISBN 978-2-296-06022-7)
