= 2026 in São Tomé and Príncipe =

- Decades: 2000s; 2010s; 2020s
- See also: Other events of 2026; Timeline of Santomean history

Events in the year 2026 in São Tomé and Príncipe.

== Incumbents ==
- President: Carlos Vila Nova
- Prime Minister: Américo Ramos

== Events ==
- 19 July – 2026 São Toméan presidential election: Carlos Vila Nova is reelected president with 55.94% of the vote against Nito Abreu.
- 27 July – The Roças of Agostinho Neto and São João dos Angolares are designated as UNESCO World Heritage Sites.
- 27 September – 2026 São Toméan parliamentary election: The MLSTP – Social Democratic Party wins a plurality of 24 seats in the 55 member National Assembly.

== Holidays ==
- 1 January – New Year's Day
- 3 February – Martyrs' Day
- 1 May – Labour Day
- 12 July – Independence Day
- 6 September – Armed Forces Day
- 30 September – Agricultural Reform Day
- 21 December – São Tomé Day
- 25 December – Christmas Day

== Deaths ==
- 15 May – Conceição Lima, 64, poet (A Dolorosa Raiz do Micondó).
