= Gareth Guadalupe =

São Toméan foreign minister

His Excellency Gareth Guadalupe
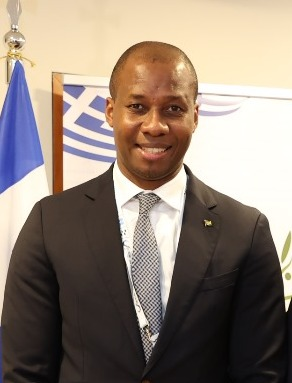
- Guadalupe in 2024

Minister of Economy and Finance
- Incumbent
- Assumed office 13 January 2025
- Prime Minister: Américo Ramos
- Preceded by: Disney Ramos

Minister of Foreign Affairs, Cooperation and Communities
- In office 8 August 2023 – 6 January 2025
- Prime Minister: Patrice Trovoada
- Preceded by: Alberto Neto Pereira
- Succeeded by: Ilza Amado Vaz

Minister of the Presidency of the Council of Ministers of São Tomé and Príncipe
- In office November 2022 – 8 August 2023
- Preceded by: Afonso da Graca Varela da Silva

Member of the National Assembly for Água Grande

Personal details
- Party: Independent Democratic Action
- Education: Universidade Lusófona; Columbia University

Gareth Haddad do Espírito Santo Guadalupe is a São Toméan politician who has been serving as the Minister of Economy and Finance since 13 January 2025. He previously served as Foreign Minister from 2023 to 2025, as the President of the Council of Ministers of the Community of Portuguese Language Countries, and as the Minister of the Presidency of the Council of Ministers from November 2022 until August 2023. He is a ADI Party Member of the National Assembly for Água Grande.

== Education ==
Guadalupe received a BSc. in Economics from the Universidade Lusófona, Portugal and MSc. in Economic Policy Management from Columbia University, New York, USA.

== Career ==
He served as Executive Director and Board Member of the Central Bank of São Tomè and Príncipe from 2015 to 2019 and as IMF Expert on Public Financial Management and Macro-fiscal policies from 2015 to 2021.

He served as Secretary General of the Presidency and as Economic Advisor to the President between October 2021 and November 2022.

He became Minister of the Presidency of the Council of Ministers in November 2022. Following the dismissal of Alberto Neto Pereira as Foreign Minister just days before the CPLP Summit in São Tomè, Guadalupe assumed the office of Foreign Minister, in which, he continues to serve.
