= 2020 in São Tomé and Príncipe =

- Decades: 2000s; 2010s; 2020s
- See also: Other events of 2020; Timeline of Santomean history

Events in the year 2020 in São Tomé and Príncipe.

== Incumbents ==
- President: Evaristo Carvalho
- Prime Minister: Jorge Bom Jesus

== Events ==
Ongoing — COVID-19 pandemic in São Tomé and Príncipe

- 6 April – The first four cases of COVID-19 in the country were confirmed.
- 30 April – A 55-year-old man living in Cantalago is the first COVID-19 death in the country.

== Deaths ==
- 19 November – Alcino Pinto, 64, São Toméan politician, president of the National Assembly (2012–2014).

== See also ==
- List of years in São Tomé and Príncipe
