= 2022 in São Tomé and Príncipe =

- Decades: 2000s; 2010s; 2020s
- See also: Other events of 2022; Timeline of Santomean history

Events in the year 2022 in São Tomé and Príncipe.

== Incumbents ==
- President: Carlos Vila Nova
- Prime Minister: Jorge Bom Jesus (until 10 November), Patrice Trovoada (starting 10 November)

== Events ==
Ongoing — COVID-19 pandemic in São Tomé and Príncipe

- 25 September – 2022 São Toméan legislative election
- 24-25 November - 2022 São Tomé and Príncipe coup d'état attempt: São Tomé and Príncipe prime minister Patrice Trovoada reports that his officials had thwarted a coup d'état attempt led by the President of the National Assembly, Delfim Neves, after they arrested Neves and another individual for infiltrating the headquarters of the armed forces in São Tomé. Four people were killed in the attempt.

== Deaths ==
- 28 May – Evaristo Carvalho, politician (born 1941)

== See also ==
- List of years in São Tomé and Príncipe
