= 2021 in São Tomé and Príncipe =

- Decades: 2000s; 2010s; 2020s
- See also: Other events of 2021; Timeline of Santomean history

Events in the year 2021 in São Tomé and Príncipe.

== Incumbents ==
- President: Evaristo Carvalho
- Prime Minister: Jorge Bom Jesus

== Events ==
Ongoing — COVID-19 pandemic in São Tomé and Príncipe

- 18 July – 2021 São Toméan presidential election: As no presidential candidate received a majority of the vote, a second round was originally scheduled to be held on 8 August 2021^{. F}ollowing an objection to the first-round result, the second round was postponed to 29 August 2021, and later postponed again to 5 September 2021
- 5 September – The second round was won by Carlos Vila Nova of Independent Democratic Action, who received 58% of the vote, defeating Guilherme Posser da Costa of the MLSTP–PSD.

== Deaths ==
- 8 January - Alda Alves de Melo dos Santos, politician and diplomat.

== See also ==
- List of years in São Tomé and Príncipe
