= 1990 in São Tomé and Príncipe =

- Decades: 1970s; 1980s; 1990s; 2000s; 2010s
- See also: Other events of 1990; Timeline of Santomean history

The following lists events that happened during 1990 in the Democratic Republic of São Tomé and Príncipe.

== Incumbents ==
- President: Leonel Mário d'Alva (acting)
- Prime Minister: Celestino Rocha da Costa

== Events ==
- May: politician Miguel Trovoada returned to São Tomé and Príncipe from exile in France
- 22 August: A Constitutional referendum took place, it became a multi-party democracy
- October: at the MLSTP party Congress, Carlos Graça was appointed as the new Secretary-General of the party. In addition, the party's name was amended to the Movement for the Liberation of São Tomé and Príncipe/Social Democratic Party (MLSTP/PSD).
- 4 November: the Democratic Convergence Party – Reflection Group (PCD-CR) was founded

== Sports ==
- GD Os Operários won the São Tomé and Príncipe Football Championship
