= 2018 in São Tomé and Príncipe =

- Decades: 1990s; 2000s; 2010s; 2020s
- See also: Other events of 2018; Timeline of Santomean history

The following lists events that happened during 2018 in the Democratic Republic of São Tomé and Príncipe.

== Incumbents ==
- President: Evaristo Carvalho
- Prime Minister: Patrice Trovoada (until 3 December); Jorge Bom Jesus (from 3 December)

== Events ==
- 1 January: currency reform: 1,000 old dobras became one new São Tomé and Príncipe dobra
- 3 December – Jorge Bom Jesus takes over as prime minister.
