= Amador's revolt =

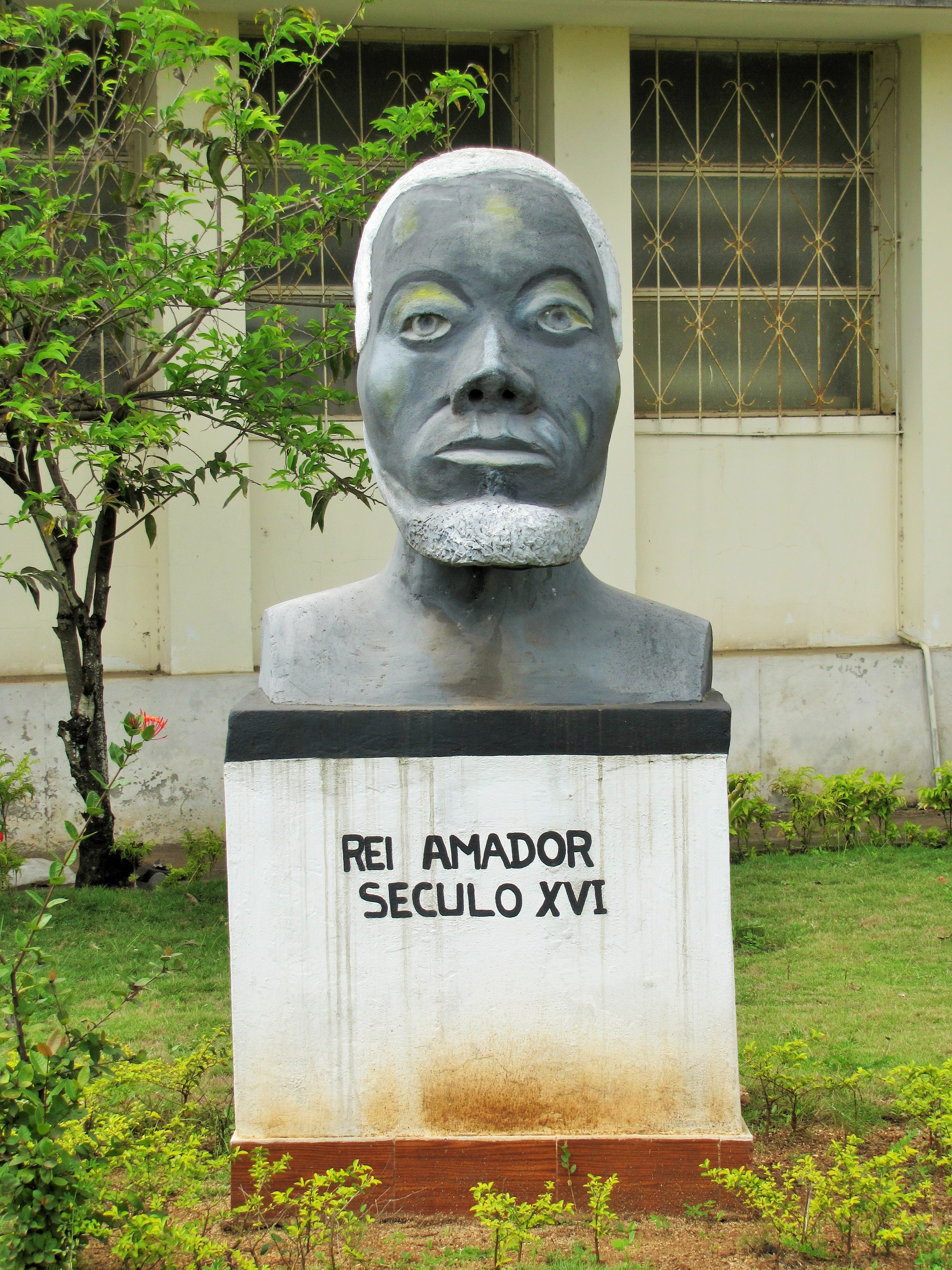
- Statue of Amador in São Tomé
Date	9 July – 14 August 1595
Location	São Tomé
Result	Portuguese victory
Territorial changes	Collapse of the Kingdom of Angolars

Belligerents
Kingdom of Portugal	Kingdom of Angolars

Commanders and leaders
Unknown	Amador (executed); Lázaro †; Domingo; Adão (executed)

Strength
Unknown	5,000

Casualties and losses
Unknown	200 dead

Amador's revolt was a failed slave uprising on the island of São Tomé from 9 July to 14 August 1595, led by Amador Vieira, against Portuguese rule. It is considered one of the greatest slave revolts in Atlantic history.
