= Ministry of Economy and Finance (São Tomé and Príncipe) =

Government ministry of São Tomé and Príncipe

- Ministério da Economia e Finanças da República Democrática de São Tomé e Príncipe

Agency overview
- Formed: 1975
- Jurisdiction: Government of São Tomé and Príncipe
- Headquarters: Largo das Alfândegas, Água Grande, São Tomé
- Minister responsible: Gareth Guadalupe
- Website: financas.gov.st

The Ministry of Economy and Finance of São Tomé and Príncipe (Ministério da Economia e Finanças da República Democrática de São Tomé e Príncipe) is the ministry responsible for managing the public finances of São Tomé and Príncipe. Its functions were carried out by the Ministry of Finance, Planning and Blue Economy (Ministério do Planeamento, Finanças e Economia Azul) prior to 2024.

== Ministers of Economy and Planning ==
Name	Took office	Left office	Notes
Leonel Mário d'Alva	1975	1975	
Miguel Trovoada	1975	1978	
Henrique Pinto da Costa	1978	1983	
Agapito Mendes Dias	1983	1985	
Manuel Pinto da Costa	1985	1986	
Agostinho Rita	1986	1987	

== Ministers of Finance and Planning ==
Name	Took office	Left office	Notes
Prudêncio Rita	1987	1988	
Teotónio Ângelo d'Alva Torres	1988	1988	
Agapito Mendes Dias	1988	1991	
Norberto Costa Alegre	1991	1992	
Arlindo de Carvalho	1992	1994	
Hélder Domingos Soares de Barros	1994	1994	
Carlos Quaresma	1994	1995	
Joaquim Rafael Branco	1995	1996	
Acácio Elba Bonfim	1996	1999	
Afonso Varela	1999	1999	
Adelino Castelo David	1999	2001	
Maria Tebús	2001	2003	
Eugénio Lourenço Soares	2003	2004	
Adelino Castelo David	2004	2005	
Maria do Carmo Silveira	2005	2006	
Maria Tebús	2006	2007	
Arlindo Carvalho	2007	2008	
Raul Antonio Da Costa Cravid	2008	2008	
Ângela Viegas Santiago	2008	2010	
Américo dos Ramos	2010	2012	
Hélio de Almeida	2012	2014	
Américo dos Ramos	2014	2018	
Osvaldo Vaz	2018	2021	
Engrácio da Graça	2021	2022	
Genésio da Mata	2022	2024	

== Ministers of Economy and Finance ==
Name	Took office	Left office	Notes
Disney Ramos	2024	2025	
Gareth Guadalupe	2025	Incumbent	

== See also ==
- Central Bank of São Tomé and Príncipe
- Economy of São Tomé and Príncipe
