= Constitution of São Tomé and Príncipe =

The Constitution of the Democratic Republic of São Tomé and Príncipe (Portuguese: Constituição da República Democrática de São Tomé e Príncipe) was first approved on 5 November 1975. There were revisions in 1980, 1987, 1990, and 2002.

== See also ==
- 1990 São Toméan constitutional referendum
