= 2025 in São Tomé and Príncipe =

- Decades: 2000s; 2010s; 2020s
- See also: Other events of 2025; Timeline of Santomean history

Events in the year 2025 in São Tomé and Príncipe.

== Incumbents ==
- President: Carlos Vila Nova
- Prime Minister: Patrice Trovoada (until 6 January); Ilza Amado Vaz (9 January–14 January); Américo Ramos (since 14 January)

== Events ==
- 6 January – President Carlos Vila Nova dismisses Prime Minister Patrice Trovoada and his government, citing Trovoada's prolonged absences and his government's failure to solve multiple issues.
- 9 January – President Carlos Vila Nova appoints Ilza Amado Vaz as Prime Minister.
- 12 January – Ilza Amado Vaz resigns as Prime Minister. She is replaced by Américo Ramos.
- 18 January – India sends humanitarian assistance with medical supplies to São Tomé and Príncipe
- 10 April– Deepak Miglani, Ambassador of India to the Democratic Republic of Sao Tome and Principe, gives 6 school buses to Maria Correia Viegas de Abreu, Minister of Education, Culture, Science and Higher Education
- 27 September – The island of São Tomé is designated as a biosphere reserve by UNESCO, making São Tomé and Príncipe the first country to be designated as such in its entirety following a previous designation on Príncipe.

== Holidays ==
- 1 January - New Year's Day
- 3 February – Martyrs' Day
- 1 May – Labour Day
- 12 July – Independence Day
- 6 September – Armed Forces Day
- 30 September – Agricultural Reform Day
- 21 December - São Tomé Day
- 25 December - Christmas Day
