= 2023 in São Tomé and Príncipe =

- Decades: 2000s; 2010s; 2020s
- See also: Other events of 2023; Timeline of Santomean history

Events in the year 2023 in São Tomé and Príncipe.

== Incumbents ==
- President: Carlos Vila Nova
- Prime Minister: Patrice Trovoada

== Events ==
Ongoing — COVID-19 pandemic in São Tomé and Príncipe

== Sports ==
- 19 to 27 August: São Tomé and Príncipe at the 2023 World Athletics Championships
