= 2010 in São Tomé and Príncipe =

- Decades: 1990s; 2000s; 2010s; 2020s
- See also: Other events of 2010; Timeline of Santomean history

The following lists events that happened during 2010 in the Democratic Republic of São Tomé and Príncipe.

== Incumbents ==
- President: Fradique de Menezes
- Prime Minister: Joaquim Rafael Branco (until 14 August), Patrice Trovoada (from 15 August)

== Events ==
- 21 February: Planned legislative elections postponed
- 1 August: the São Toméan legislative election took place. The Independent Democratic Action (ADI) won 26 out of 55 seats
- 14 August: the XIV Constitutional Government of São Tomé and Príncipe began with Patrice Trovoada as Prime Minister
- 11 September: the IX Legislature of the National Assembly of São Tomé and Príncipe began

== Sports ==
- GD Sundy won the São Tomé and Príncipe Football Championship

== Deaths ==
- Celestino Rocha da Costa, Prime Minister of São Tomé and Príncipe (1988–1991), in Portugal (b. 1938)
