= 2001 in São Tomé and Príncipe =

- Decades: 1980s; 1990s; 2000s; 2010s; 2020s
- See also: Other events of 2001; Timeline of Santomean history

The following lists events that happened during 2001 in the Democratic Republic of São Tomé and Príncipe.

== Incumbents ==
- President: Miguel Trovoada
- Prime Minister: Miguel Trovoada (until 2 September), Fradique de Menezes (from 3 September)

== Events ==
- 21 February: the Joint Development Authority with Nigeria was signed
- 26 April: the Maritime border agreement with Gabon was signed
- 29 July: The presidential election took place
- Force for Change Democratic Movement – Liberal Party (MDFM-PL) founded
- 3 September: Fradique de Menezes becomes president of São Tomé and Príncipe
- 8 December: Fradique de Menezes issued a decree dissolving the Parliament

== Sports ==
- Bairros Unidos FC won the São Tomé and Príncipe Football Championship
