= 1996 in São Tomé and Príncipe =

- Decades: 1970s; 1980s; 1990s; 2000s; 2010s
- See also: Other events of 1996; Timeline of Santomean history

The following lists events that happened during 1996 in the Democratic Republic of São Tomé and Príncipe.

== Incumbents ==
- President: Miguel Trovoada
- Prime Minister: Armindo Vaz d'Almeida (until 19 November), Raul Bragança Neto (starting 19 November)

== Events ==
- 30 June-21 July: First and second round of the presidential election took place
- early-August: The Supreme Court declared that it was unable to adjudicate on the appeal made by Manuel Pinto da Costa, and recommended that the government seek international legal arbitration.
- 20 August: Manuel Pinto da Costa withdrew his challenge and Trovoada was confirmed as president.
- 31 December: the Higher Polytechnic Institute of São Tomé and Príncipe was established

== Sports ==
- Bairros Unidos FC won the São Tomé and Príncipe Football Championship
