= Maria Tebús =

São Toméan politician

Maria dos Santos Lima da Costa Tebús Torres (born 2 September 1958) is a São Toméan politician.

She was born in the village of Santa Filomena in the island of São Tomé. She held the position of Minister of Planning and Finance from 2001 to August 2003. On 21 April 2006, she was appointed Deputy Prime Minister and Minister of Planning and Finance in the government of Tomé Vera Cruz. She served until 2007.

Tebus is a member of the Democratic Convergence Party-Reflection Group (PCD-GR).
