= 1985 in São Tomé and Príncipe =

- Decades: 1960s; 1970s; 1980s; 1990s; 2000s
- See also: Other events of 1985; Timeline of Santomean history

The following lists events that happened during 1985 in the Democratic Republic of São Tomé and Príncipe.

== Incumbents ==
- President: Manuel Pinto da Costa

== Events ==
- 30 September: The legislative election took place

== Sports ==
- Sporting Praia Cruz won the São Tomé and Príncipe Football Championship
