= 2002 in São Tomé and Príncipe =

- Decades: 1980s; 1990s; 2000s; 2010s; 2020s
- See also: Other events of 2002; Timeline of Santomean history

The following lists events that happened during 2002 in the Democratic Republic of São Tomé and Príncipe.

== Incumbents ==
- President: Miguel Trovoada
- Prime Minister: Fradique de Menezes (from 3 September)

== Events ==
- 2 March: The legislative election took place
- 27 March: President Fradique de Menezes ended three weeks of political deadlock by asking the country's envoy to Portugal, Gabriel Costa, to form a government. The latter formed a government with representatives from the three main political coalitions.
- May: the National Library of São Tomé and Príncipe opened
- 18 April: Dionísio Tomé Dias becomes president of the National Assembly
