= 2003 in São Tomé and Príncipe =

- Decades: 1980s; 1990s; 2000s; 2010s; 2020s
- See also: Other events of 2003; Timeline of Santomean history

The following lists events that happened during 2003 in the Democratic Republic of São Tomé and Príncipe.

== Incumbents ==
- President: Fradique de Menezes
- Prime Minister: Maria das Neves

== Events ==
- January 22: President Fradique de Menezes dissolved parliament over disagreements related to issues of presidential power.
- July 16-23: An attempted coup d'état took place.

== Sports ==
- Inter Bom Bom won the São Tomé and Príncipe Football Championship.
