= 2009 in São Tomé and Príncipe =

- Decades: 1980s; 1990s; 2000s; 2010s; 2020s
- See also: Other events of 2009; Timeline of Santomean history

The following lists events that happened during 2009 in the Democratic Republic of São Tomé and Príncipe.

== Incumbents ==
- President: Fradique de Menezes
- Prime Minister: Joaquim Rafael Branco
