= 2024 in São Tomé and Príncipe =

- Decades: 2000s; 2010s; 2020s
- See also: Other events of 2024; Timeline of Santomean history

Events in the year 2024 in São Tomé and Príncipe.

== Incumbents ==
- President: Carlos Vila Nova
- Prime Minister: Patrice Trovoada

== Events ==
- 19 July – Thirty-six people are rescued after fires break out onboard the São Tomé and Príncipe-flagged tanker Ceres I and Singapore-flagged tanker Hafnia Nile following a collision near Pedra Branca, Singapore. The remaining 26 Ceres I crew members remain onboard to conduct fire-fighting operations.

== Holidays ==
- 1 January - New Year's Day
- 3 February – Martyrs' Day
- 1 May – Labour Day
- 12 July – Independence Day
- 6 September – Armed Forces Day
- 30 September – Agricultural Reform Day
- 21 December - São Tomé Day
- 25 December - Christmas Day
