= São Tomé and Príncipe escudo =

Currency of São Tomé and Príncipe between 1914 and 1977

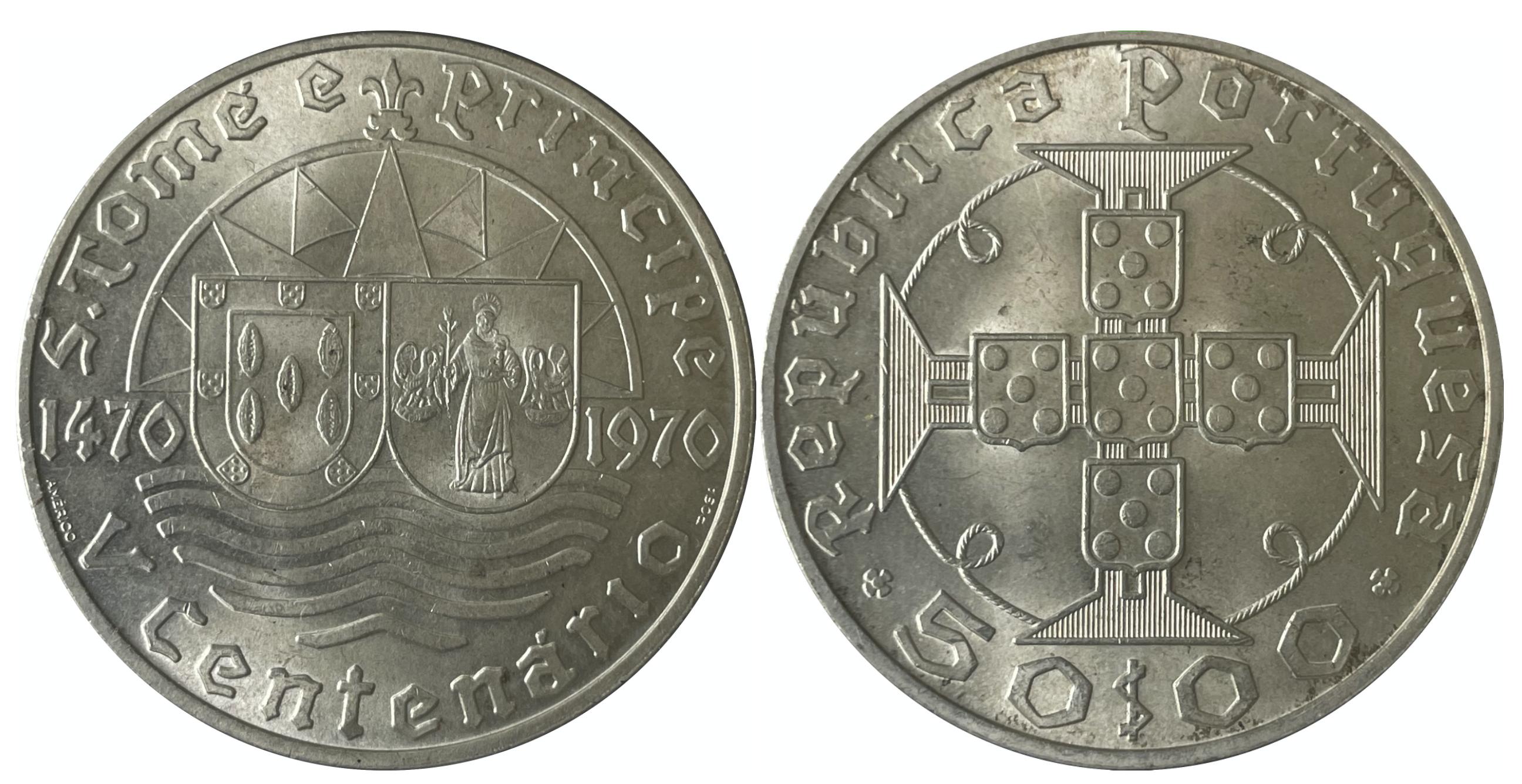

Denominations
- Subunit
- 1/100: Centavo
- Banknotes: 20, 50, 100, 500, 1000 escudos
- Coins: 10, 20, 50 centavos, 1, 2 1/2, 5, 10, 20 escudos

Demographics
- User(s): São Tomé and Príncipe

Issuance
- Bank of issue: Banco Nacional Ultramarino
- This infobox shows the latest status before this currency was rendered obsolete.

The escudo was the currency of São Tomé and Príncipe between 1914 and 1977. It was equivalent to the Portuguese escudo and subdivided into 100 centavos.

== History ==
The escudo replaced the real at a rate of 1000 réis = 1 escudo. Initially, only banknotes were issued in the name of São Tomé and Príncipe and the colony used Portuguese coins. Only in 1929 were coins also issued for the colony. The escudo was replaced at par by the dobra following independence.

== Coins ==
In 1929, nickel-bronze 10, 20 and 50 centavos coins were introduced. These were followed in 1939 by cupro-nickel 1 escudo and silver 2 1/2, 5 and 10 escudos. Bronze 10, 20 and 50 centavos and 1 escudo, and cupro-nickel 2 1/2 escudos were introduced in 1962, followed, in 1971, by aluminium 10 centavos and cupro-nickel 5, 10 and 20 escudos. This was the last year of coin production.

== Banknotes ==
In 1914, the Banco National Ultramarino introduced notes for 10, 20 and 50 centavos, followed by 5 centavos notes in 1918. In 1921, larger denominations of 1, 2 1/2, 5, 10, 20, 50 and 100 escudos were introduced. 500 escudos were introduced in 1956, followed by 1000 escudos in 1964.

Between 1974 and 1976, the Banco Nacional de São Tomé e Príncipe issued bearer cheques for circulation in denominations of 100, 500 and 1000 escudos. In 1976, the Banco Nacional also issued notes of the Banco National Ultramarino, overprinted with the new bank's name, in denominations of 20, 50, 100, 500 and 1000 escudos.
