= IX Legislature of the National Assembly of São Tomé and Príncipe =

The IX Legislature of the National Assembly of São Tomé and Príncipe (Portuguese: IX Legislatura da Assembleia Nacional de São Tomé e Príncipe) was a legislature of the National Assembly of São Tomé and Príncipe. It officially began on 11 September 2010 and ended on 15 August 2014.

- President: Evaristo Carvalho (until 26 November 2012), Alcino Martinho de Barros Pinto (from 28 November 2012)
- Vice-President: Maria das Neves and José da Graça Diogo
- Secretaries: Celmira Sacramento, Deolindo da Mata, Sebastião Pinheiro
- Vice-Secretaries: Carlos Correia and Filomena dos Prazeres

== Parliamentary groups ==
Group	President	Number of deputados
ADI	Idalécio Augusto Quaresma	26
MLSTP/PSD	José da Graça Viegas Santiago	21
PCD	Delfim Santiago das Neves	7

== See also ==
- São Tomé and Príncipe legislative election, 2010
