= 2004 in São Tomé and Príncipe =

- Decades: 1980s; 1990s; 2000s; 2010s; 2020s
- See also: Other events of 2004; Timeline of Santomean history

The following lists events that happened during 2004 in the Democratic Republic of São Tomé and Príncipe.

== Incumbents ==
- President: Fradique de Menezes
- Prime Minister: Maria das Neves (until 18 September), Damião Vaz d'Almeida (from 18 September)

== Events ==
- 15 September: Maria das Neves was dismissed from the post as Prime Minister
- 18 September: Damião Vaz d'Almeida sworn in as Prime Minister succeeding Maria das Neves

== Sports ==
- GD Os Operários won the São Tomé and Príncipe Football Championship
