= 2011 in São Tomé and Príncipe =

- Decades: 1990s; 2000s; 2010s; 2020s
- See also: Other events of 2011; Timeline of Santomean history

The following lists events that happened during 2011 in the Democratic Republic of São Tomé and Príncipe.

== Incumbents ==
- President:
  - Fradique de Menezes
  - Manuel Pinto da Costa
- Prime Minister: Patrice Trovoada

== Events ==
- July 17-August 7: São Tomé and Príncipe presidential election, 2011, won by Manuel Pinto da Costa

== Sports ==
- Sporting Príncipe won the São Tomé and Príncipe Football Championship
