= Adelino Castelo David =

São Toméan politician

Adelino Santiago Castelo David (born 1955) is a São Toméan bank manager and politician.

== Biography ==
David graduated with a doctorate. He became a bank manager and was later president of Caixa Nacional de Poupanças e Crédito. In 1992, he became posted as governor of the Central Bank of São Tomé and Príncipe, the post was later taken by Carlos Quaresma Batista da Silva in 1994. Afterwards he worked at the World Bank and work as a consultant to his national government.

In January 1999, he became Minister of Finance and Planning under the Prime Minister Guilherme Posser da Costa up to 26 September 2001. He was later advisor to the finance minister from 2002 to 2004.

Once more, he became Minister of Finance and Planning under Prime Minister Damião Vaz d'Almeida from 18 September 2004 to 2 June 2005. Later, he was temporary a consultant to the finance minister.

Preceded by Manuel de Nazaré Mendes	Governor of the Central Bank of São Tomé and Príncipe; 1992-1994	Succeeded by Carlos Quaresma Batista da Silva
