= 2026 São Toméan presidential election =

National election

- 19 July 2026
- Registered: 142,182
- Turnout: 41.43%
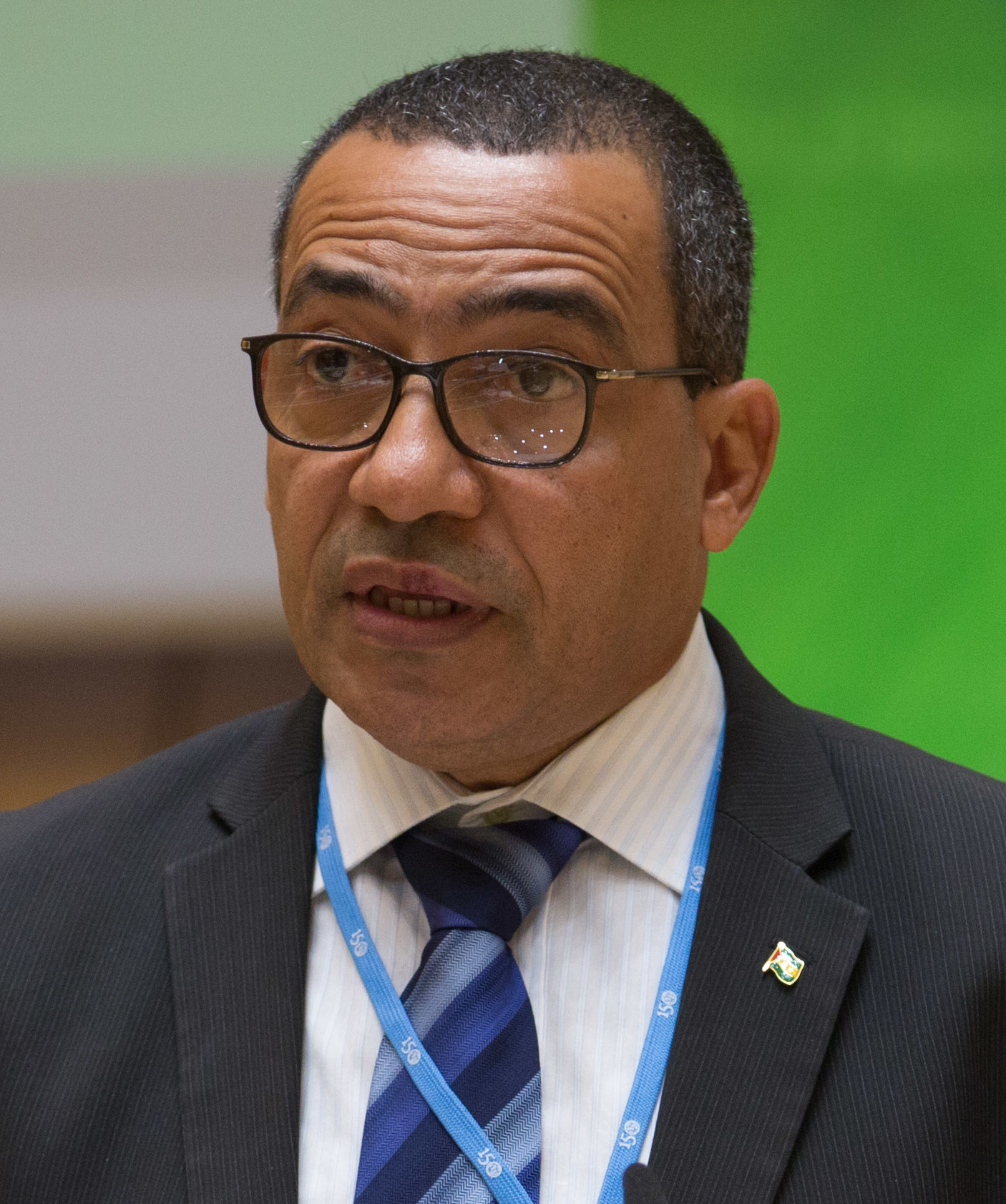

Nominee	Carlos Vila Nova	Nito Abreu
Party	Independent	ADI
Alliance	MLSTP–PSD
Popular vote	31,613	23,457
Percentage	55.88%	41.46%
President before election
Carlos Vila Nova
ADI
Elected President
Carlos Vila Nova
Independent

Presidential elections were held in São Tomé and Príncipe on 19 July 2026. Incumbent president Carlos Vila Nova won re-election in the first round, this time running as an independent candidate with support from MLSTP–PSD, receiving 55.88% of the vote, while his main opposition candidate, Nito Abreu, who was supported by Vila Nova's former party Independent Democratic Action, reached 41.46%. The turnout reached a record low of 41%.

== Background ==
In the 2021 presidential elections, president Carlos Vila Nova was elected with 58% of the vote, defeating MLSTP–PSD candidate Guilherme Posser da Costa, who took 42% of the vote. In November 2022, the country thwarted a coup attempt that involved at least one member of the officially disbanded South African group Buffalo Battalion.

On 6 January 2025, Vila Nova dismissed Prime Minister Patrice Trovoada and his government, citing Trovoada's prolonged absences and his government's failure to solve multiple issues. Trovoada responded calling his dismissal "illegal" and "unconstitutional". Vila Nova then selected then Minister of Justice, Ilza Amado Vaz, as prime minister. Vaz then resigned, stating in a letter that her continued leadership "would not contribute to the success of public policies and the harmonious and peaceful development." Vila Nova thereafter picked Américo Ramos, who was not endorsed for the prime ministerial role by the ADI, being criticized for ignoring the majority of the National Assembly.

Since the collapse of Trovoada's government, the ADI has been mired in a leadership crisis, split between Trovoada's faction and a faction led by current Prime Minister Américo Ramos backed by Carlos Vila Nova. The Supreme Court of Justice declared that the president's firing of the cabinet was unconstitutional and outside the head of state's powers but that its decision would not have any retroactive effect. The majority of the parliament made up of ADI adopted a resolution to keep Ramos in power ahead of the presidential and parliamentary elections.

== Electoral system ==
The president of São Tomé and Príncipe is elected using the two-round system for a five-year term. If no candidate receives more than 50% of the vote in the first round of voting, a run-off is held with the top two candidates. The role of president is largely ceremonial, with power in the hands of the prime minister.

A total of 142,191 people were registered for the election, consisting of 121,670 residing in the country and 20,521 in the diaspora.

== Candidates ==
In total, 6 candidates filed to run. However, the candidacy of Nino Monteiro, who received the support of MCI–PS, was invalidated by the Constitutional Court in an initial decision on 16 June. An appeal by Monteiro led to the court confirming its decision on 22 June, stating that Monteiro did not meet requirements that he was a citizen of origin, as his parents, from Cape Verde, did not undergo the naturalization process to become Santomean citizens.

The former leader of MLSTP–PSD, Jorge Bom Jesus, withdrew from the election after the party decided to support incumbent president Carlos Vila Nova. However, he did that outside the legal deadline and his name remained on the ballot, with votes for him not officially counted.

Candidate	Party	Notes
Carlos Vila Nova	Independent (with support from MLSTP–PSD)	Incumbent President
Nito Abreu	Independent Democratic Action	Leader of ADI parliamentary group
Jorge Bom Jesus	Independent	Former leader of MLSTP–PSD
Miques João Bonfim	Independent	Lawyer
Eugénio Tiny	Independent	Diplomat

== Campaign ==
On 3 July, the day before the official campaign period began, president Carlos Vila Nova became the only candidate to sign a non-aggression agreement after the other candidates backed out from signing at the last minute. The early days of the campaign period saw Nito Abreu hold rallies in the Agua Grande and Lobata districts, and the disqualified candidate Nino Monteiro also decided to endorse Abreu. Vila Nova also held a rally in the Mé-Zóchi District on 5 July, pledging to be a president of balance. Both Vila Nova and Abreu hosted campaign rallies in the Lembá District, with Vila Nova appealing for stability on 6 July and Abreu pledging to fight corruption on 8 July.

Lesser candidates also campaigned, with Miques João Bonfim pledging for a living wage, along with development in solar energy and hydroelectric dams. Eugénio Tiny also decided to conduct a door-to-door campaign instead of holding rallies, pledging for structural and administrative reforms.

== Conduct ==
The European Union deployed an election observation mission, headed by Sérgio Humberto, to oversee electoral processes. The African Union similarly sent its own election observation mission to support preparations leading up to the election. The Economic Community of Central African States, the Community of Portuguese Language Countries, and the Group of Seven Plus also sent their own missions.

== Results ==
The incumbent Carlos Vila Nova secured a second term in office after winning more than 55% of the vote, while the main ADI challenger Nito Abreu secured second place with 41% of the vote. Miques João Bonfim secured third with 1.59% of the vote, while Eugénio Tiny came last with 1.07% of the vote. The abstention rate was a record high of 58.57%, with 79.97% of the diaspora not voting.

Candidate	Party	Votes	%
Carlos Vila Nova	Independent (MLSTP–PSD)	31,613	55.88
Nito Abreu	Independent Democratic Action	23,457	41.46
Miques João Bonfim	Independent	900	1.59
Eugénio Tiny	Independent	604	1.07
Total		56,574	100.00
Valid votes		56,574	96.04
Invalid votes		1,741	2.96
Blank votes		591	1.00
Total votes		58,906	100.00
Registered voters/turnout		142,182	41.43
Source: Tribunal Constitucional

== Aftermath ==
After securing a second term, Vila Nova pledged to provide unity and expand national development, while also promising to support youth employment and uphold democratic institutions. Abreu conceded defeat following the election, thanking his supporters who voted for him while also regretting high abstention rates.
