= Economy of São Tomé and Príncipe =

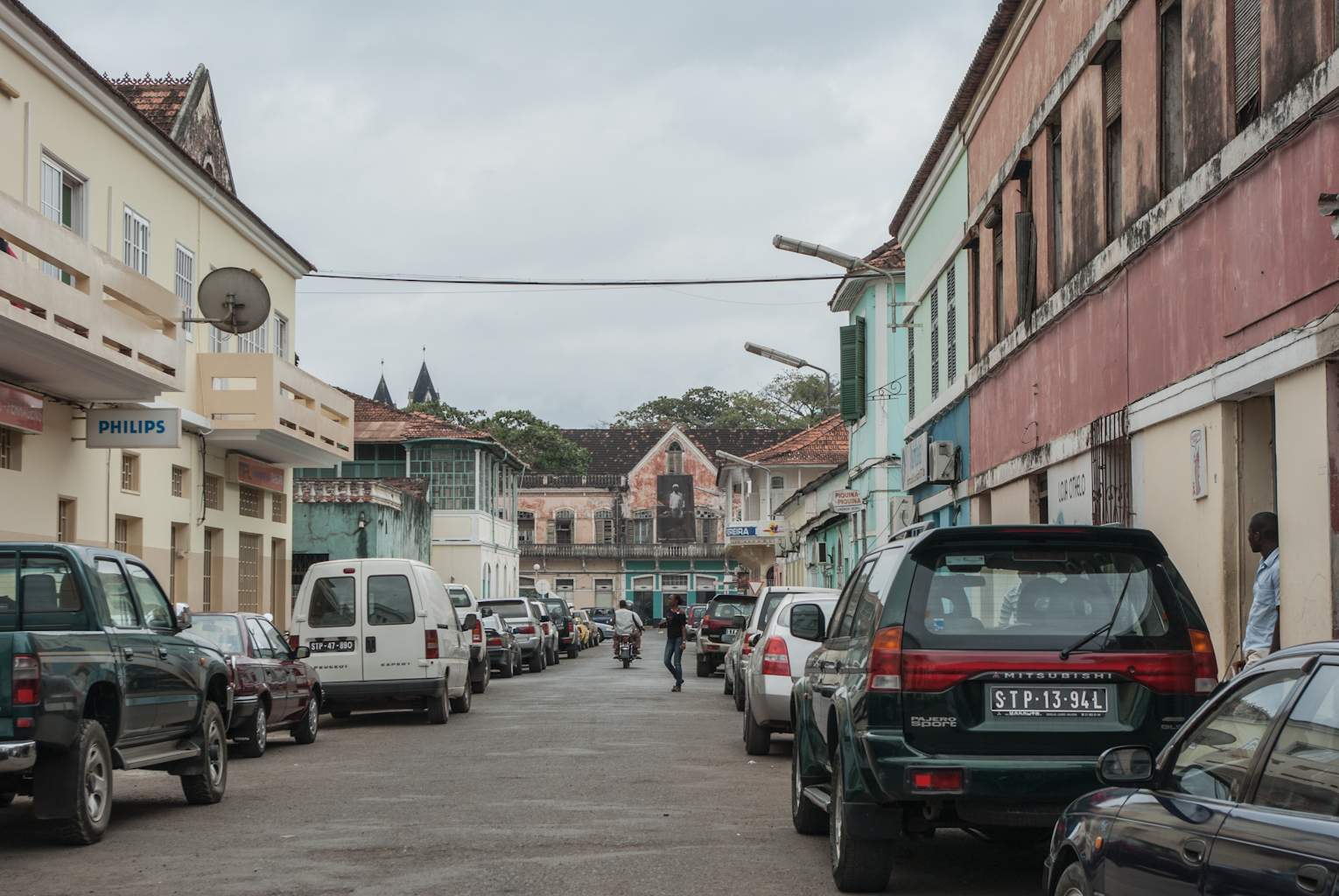
- Capital city of São Tomé
- Currency: São Tomé and Príncipe Dobra (now STN, was STD)

Statistics
- GDP: ▲$0.86 billion (nominal; 2025); ▲$1.55 billion (PPP; 2025)
- GDP rank: 186th (nominal; 2025); 187th (PPP; 2025)
- GDP growth: 3.8% (2025); 4.3% (2026f)
- GDP per capita: ▲$3,570 (nominal; 2025); ▲$6,420 (PPP; 2025)
- GDP per capita rank: 130th (nominal; 2025); 144th (PPP; 2025)
- GDP per capita growth: -1.0% (2025)
- Inflation (CPI): ▲5.8% (2017 est.)
- Labour force: 52,490 (2007 est.)
- Labour force by occupation: Population mainly engaged in subsistence agriculture and fishing
- Unemployment: 9.1% (2025)
- Youth unemployment: 8.8% (2025)
- Main industries: light construction, textiles, soap, beer, fish processing, timber

External
- Exports: ▲$11.7 million (2012 est.)
- Export goods: cocoa, copra, coffee, palm oil
- Main export partners: Netherlands 32.7% Belgium 21.4% Spain 10.8% Nigeria 5.7% United States 5.0% (2012 est.)
- Imports: ▲$121.6 million (2012 est.)
- Import goods: machinery, electrical equipment, petroleum products, food
- Main import partners: Portugal 63.0% Gabon 6.0% (2012 est.)
- Gross external debt: ▲$299.5 million (31 December 2012 est.)

Public finance
- Government debt: ▼83.5% of GDP (2012 est.)
- Foreign reserves: ▲$51.58 million (31 December 2012 est.)
- Budget balance: ▼ -10% of GDP (2012 est.)
- Revenue: $105.5 million (2012 est.)
- Spending: $131.8 million (2012 est.)
- All values, unless otherwise stated, are in US dollars.

== History ==
Under Portuguese colonial rule, sugar plantations were set up, and the islands were used for the transshipment of slaves.

The government has an economic program that is supported by the IMF, via its Extended Credit Facility arrangement.

== Sectors ==
=== Agriculture ===
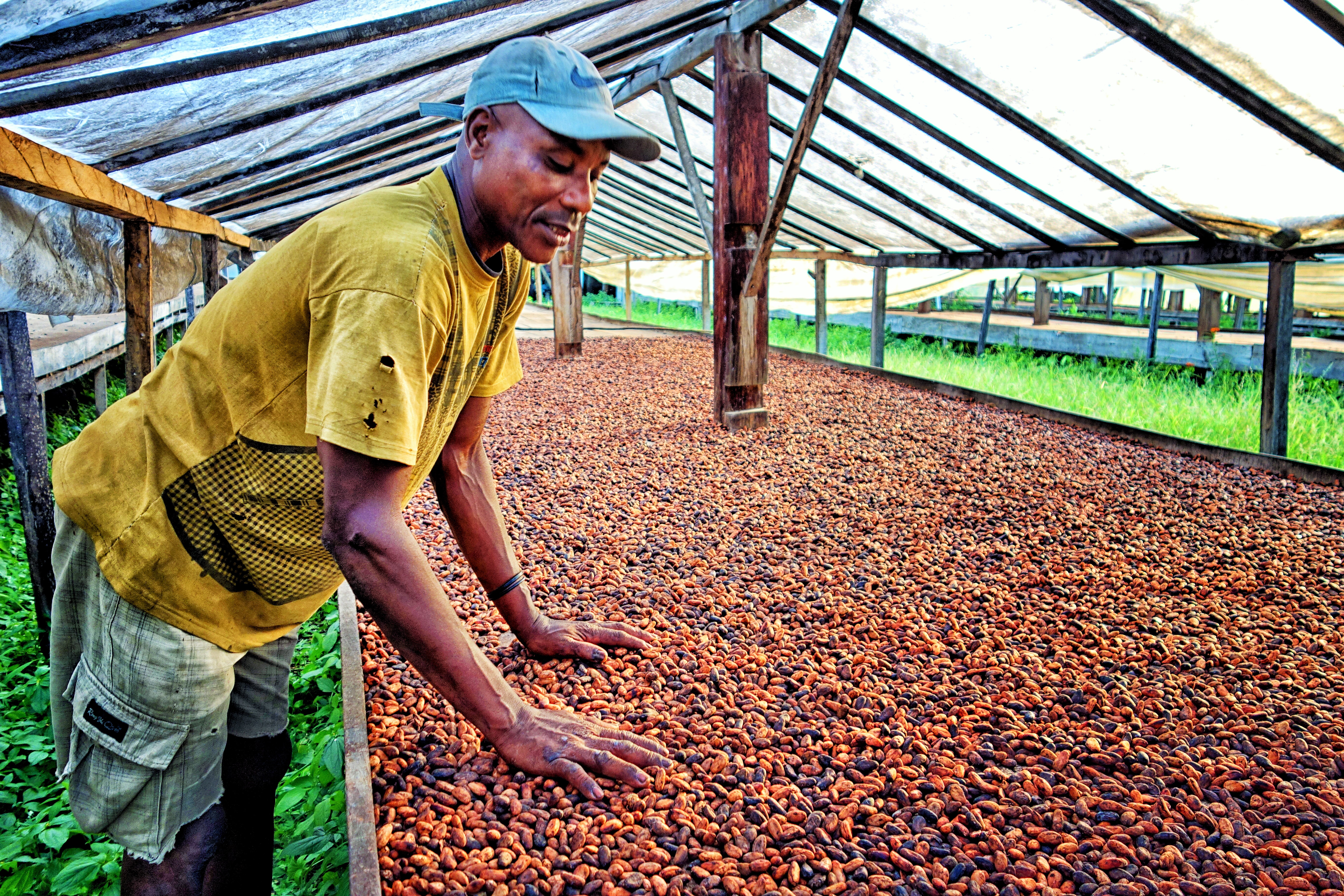
Coffee farm in São Tomé and Príncipe

Since the 1800s, the economy of São Tomé and Príncipe has been based on plantation agriculture. At the time of independence, Portuguese-owned plantations occupied 90% of the cultivated area. After independence, control of these plantations passed to various state-owned agricultural enterprises. The dominant crop on São Tomé is cocoa, representing about 95% of exports. Other export crops include copra, palm kernels, and coffee.

=== Oil reserves ===
Geologists estimate that the Gulf of Guinea zone (Niger Delta province) holds more than 10 billion barrels (1.6 km^{3}) of oil, although no reserves have yet been proven. A joint oil project with Nigeria in 2005 is likely to contribute $50 million of revenues to the government from the exploration licence signing fees. This represents four times government revenues in 2004. São Tomé is optimistic that significant petroleum discoveries under the exploration licence are forthcoming, though no crude oil nor natural gas has been found as of 2021.

== Infrastructure ==
=== Transport ===
Transport in São Tomé and Príncipe relies primarily on road infrastructure for local needs and airports and sea travel for international needs. São Tomé and Príncipe does not have railways.

== Data ==
Gross domestic product: purchasing power parity – $316.9 million (2010 est.), $214 million (2003 est.)

GDP – real growth rate: 6% (2010 est.), 5% (2004 est.)

GDP – per capita: purchasing power parity – $1,800 (2010 est.), $1,200 (2003 est.)

Unemployment rate: 12.2% in the formal business sector (2017 est.)

Budget:

- revenues: $58 million
- expenditures: $114 million, including capital expenditures of $54 million (1993 est.)

Industries: light construction, textiles, soap, beer; fish processing; timber

Agriculture – products: cocoa, coconuts, palm kernels, copra, cinnamon, pepper, coffee, bananas, papayas, beans; poultry; fish

Exports: $13 million (2010 est.)

Exports – commodities: cocoa 80%, copra, coffee, palm oil (2009)

Exports – partners: United Kingdom 32.99%, Netherlands 26.93%, Belgium 21.04%, Portugal 4.31% (2009)

Imports: $127.7 million (2017 est.)

Petroleum – it needs to import all of its required petroleum

== Macroeconomic statistics ==
Exports of Sao Tome and Principe by product category (2019) Chemical products Transportation Machines Mineral products Plastics and rubbers Metals Foodstuffs Precious metals Textiles Instruments Animal products Vegetable products Paper goods Footwear and headwear Miscellaneous Stone and glass Wood products Animal and vegetable bi-products Animal hides Arts and antiques Weapons

The following table shows the main economic indicators in 1980-2026. Inflation below 5% is in green.

Year	GDP			GDP growth (real)	Inflation	Government debt (% of GDP)
Year	Total (bil. US$ PPP)	Per capita (US$ PPP)	Total (bil. US$ nominal)	GDP growth (real)	Inflation	Government debt (% of GDP)
1980	0.1	1501	0.1	▼ -1.1	▲0.2	n/a
1985	▲0.2	▲1575	0.1	▲9.3	▲0.1	n/a
1990	0.2	▼1503	0.1	▼ -2.2	▲42.2	n/a
1995	0.2	▲1638	0.1	▲2.0	▲36.8	n/a
2000	▲0.3	▲1758	0.1	▲0.4	▲11.0	n/a
2005	▲0.4	▲2182	0.1	▲7.1	▲17.2	▲334.2
2006	0.4	▲2395	0.1	▲9.1	▲23.1	▼283.2
2007	0.4	▲2479	0.1	▲3.3	▲18.6	▼110.1
2008	▲0.5	▲2669	▲0.2	▲8.2	▲32.0	▼60.7
2009	0.5	▲2711	0.2	▲3.3	▲17.0	▲70.3
2010	0.5	▲2723	0.2	▲1.4	▲13.3	▲83
2011	0.5	▲2776	0.2	▲2.0	▲14.3	▲86
2012	0.5	▲2853	0.2	▲2.9	▲10.6	▼59.6
2013	▲0.6	▲2992	▲0.3	▲5.1	▲8.1	▲76.8
2014	0.6	▲3134	0.3	▲4.9	▲7.0	▲92.5
2015	0.6	▲3156	0.3	▲1.5	▲6.1	▲101.1
2016	▲0.7	▲3295	0.3	▲5.2	▲5.4	▲104.6
2017	0.7	▲3436	0.3	▲4.1	▲5.7	▼92.3
2018	▲0.8	▲3941	▲0.4	▲4.4	▲7.9	▲95.9
2019	▲1.0	▲4655	0.4	▲2.0	▲7.7	▲98.6
2020	▲1.1	▲5145	▲0.5	▲2.6	▲9.8	▼91
2021	▲1.3	▲5733	0.5	▲1.9	▲8.1	▼85.1
2022	▲1.4	▲6033	0.5	▲0.2	▲18.1	▲86.8
2023	1.4	▲6155	▲0.7	▲0.4	▲21.1	▼73.2
2024	▲1.5	▲6252	▲0.8	▲1.1	▲14.4	▼65.2
2025	1.5	▲6435	▲1.0	▲2.1	▲0.9	▼55.7
2026	▲1.6	▲6712	▲1.2	▲3.4	▲9.6	▼50.4

== See also ==
- Central Bank of São Tomé and Príncipe
- Ministry of Finance and Planning (São Tomé and Príncipe)
- Cuisine of São Tomé and Príncipe
- United Nations Economic Commission for Africa
