= 2006 in São Tomé and Príncipe =

- Decades: 1980s; 1990s; 2000s; 2010s; 2020s
- See also: Other events of 2006; Timeline of Santomean history

The following lists events that happened during 2006 in the Democratic Republic of São Tomé and Príncipe.

== Incumbents ==
- President: Fradique de Menezes
- Prime Minister: Maria do Carmo Silveira (until 21 April), Tomé Vera Cruz (from 21 April)

== Events ==
- Parque Natural Obô de São Tomé and Parque Natural Obô do Príncipe created
- 25 March: the São Toméan legislative election took place
- April: the XI Constitutional Government of São Tomé and Príncipe began
- 18 May - Francisco da Silva succeeded Dionísio Tomé Dias as President of the National Assembly
- 20 June: João Paulo Cassandra becomes President of the Regional Government of Príncipe
- 30 July: the São Toméan presidential election took place
- 5 October: José Cassandra becomes President of the Regional Government of Príncipe
