= 1991 in São Tomé and Príncipe =

- Decades: 1970s; 1980s; 1990s; 2000s; 2010s
- See also: Other events of 1991; Timeline of Santomean history

The following lists events that happened during 1991 in the Democratic Republic of São Tomé and Príncipe.

== Incumbents ==
- President: Leonel Mário d'Alva (acting) (until 3 April), Miguel Trovoada (from 3 April)
- Prime Minister: Celestino Rocha da Costa (until 7 February), Daniel Daio (from 7 February)

== Events ==
- 20 January: The first legislative election took place
- 7 February: Daniel Daio becomes Prime Minister of São Tomé and Príncipe
- 3 March: The first presidential election took place
- 2 April: Miguel Trovoada becomes the second president of São Tomé and Príncipe
- April: the I Constitutional Government of São Tomé and Príncipe began

== Sports ==
- Santana FC won the São Tomé and Príncipe Football Championship
