= Hélder Barros =

Santoméan economist and diplomat

Hélder Domingos Soares de Barros is a Santoméan economist, diplomat and former minister of finance and economic coordination in São Tomé and Príncipe. He was a candidate for the presidency of his country in 2011 and 2016.

In his early twenties Hélder Barros contributed to the struggle for independence of the archipelago by hosting radio programs for the independence movement from Libreville, Gabon.

He graduated with a M.Econ. from California Coast University, and joined the UN in 1982 in Niger. In the following decades, he worked on conflict resolution in several African countries under the mandate of the organization. Barros was coordinator for the United Nations Office for Project Services in northern Iraq and subsequently returned to Africa as Special Assistant for the United Nations mission in Angola (2002–2003), and between 2008 and 2014 he was Head of Office for the UN mission in the Democratic Republic of Congo. From 1987 to 1989, Barros completed postgraduate studies in International Relations at the London School of Economics.

He was minister of finance and economic coordination between 7 July 1994 and 25 October 1994 and again from 26 September 2001 to 28 March 2002 in the governments led by Evaristo de Carvalho from Independent Democratic Action.
