= Nito Abreu =

São Toméan politician born c.1982

Member of the National Assembly of São Tomé and Príncipe
- Incumbent
- Assumed office 2022

Personal details
- Born: 1982 or 1983 Almerim, São Tomé and Príncipe
- Party: ADI

Nito de Sousa Viegas D'Abreu (Portuguese pronunciation: ['ni.tu dɨ 'sow.zɐ 'vjɛ.ɣɐʒ ˈða.βɾew], born in 1982 or 1983 in Almerim) is a Santomean politician currently serving in the National Assembly of São Tomé and Príncipe. He also serves as the parliamentary leader for the Independent Democratic Action party and was a candidate for the 2026 Presidential elections.
