= Almeirim, São Tomé and Principe =

Almeirim
- Location in São Tomé island
- Coordinates: 0°19′N 6°43′E
- Country: São Tomé and Príncipe
- Island: São Tomé
- District: Água Grande

Population (2012)
  - Total: 1,591
- Time zone: UTC+1 (WAT)
- Climate: Aw

Almeirim is a village on São Tomé Island in the nation of São Tomé and Príncipe. Its population is 1,591 (2012 census). It is in the southern part of the Água Grande District and borders the city São Tomé to the northeast.

== Population history ==
Historical population
Year	Pop.	±%
2001	1,217	—
2008	1,387	+14.0%
2012	1,591	+14.7%
