= Public Financial Management Group =

- Founded: 1975
- Headquarters: Philadelphia

Public Financial Management Company (PFMS) is a Philadelphia-based public finance financial advisory firm which focuses on asset management and consulting services for municipalities, cities, schools, hospitals and other public entities. The company was founded in 1975 and currently has 35 offices around the country. John Bonow was appointed CEO of PFM in September 2011.

The Securities Data Corporation has ranked PFM Company as the number one financial advisory firm in the nation, based on transactions managed between 1984 and 2008. In 2008, PFM Company managed 689 municipal bond issues with a total value just under $43 billion.
