= Ângela Viegas Santiago =

São Toméan politician

- Education: University of Lisbon
- Occupation: politician
- Known for: Minister of Finance
- Predecessor: Raul Antonio Da Costa Cravid

Ângela Viegas Santiago is a São Toméan politician. She served as the country's minister of agriculture and later the minister of finance from 2008 to 2010.

== Life ==
Viegas is from Sao Tome. She studied economics and she went to Portugal to take her doctorate in Socio-economic Development at the University of Lisbon.

She has worked for, and as a consultant to, the World Bank. She has worked for decades on issues related to finance and public policies.

Viegas was her country's Minister of Agriculture and Rural Development until 22 June 2008 when she became the Minister of Finance under Prime Minister Joaquim Rafael Branco. On 11 October 2008, as her country's minister of finance, she signed the Articles of Agreement of the International Finance Corporation (IFC) on behalf of Sao Tome and Principe in Washington DC.

In February 2010, she was signing letters of intent with the International Monetary Fund to commit to conditions that would allow her country to have additional financial assistance.

On 2015, she became a Senior Economist (consultant) at the Central Bank of São Tomé and Príncipe (BCSTP). In the following year she was defending French speaking at the University of Sao Tome and Principe, where she is a Professor who manages the university's degree in Business Economic Sciences.

In 2002 she published her book, Os desafios do desenvolvimento socioeconómico nos microestados insulares, in Portuguese, that looked at the challenges facing micro-states.
