= José da Graça Diogo =

São Toméan politician (1956–2022)

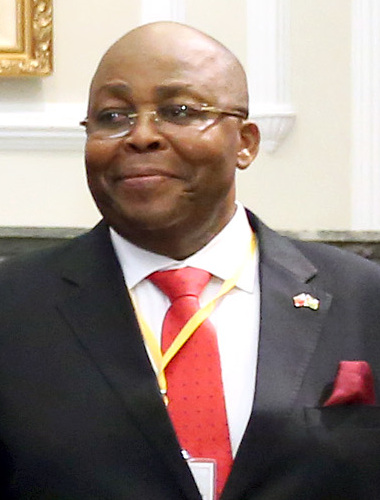
Image of José da Graça Diogo

José da Graça Diogo (December 1956 – 9 October 2022) was a São Toméan politician. Previously serving as Minister of Natural Resources and Environment, he was president of the National Assembly from 2014 to 2018.

Political offices
Preceded by Alcino Pinto	President of the National Assembly of São Tomé and Príncipe; 2014–2018	Succeeded by Delfim Neves
