= Gabon–São Tomé and Príncipe Maritime Border Agreement =

Gabon – São Tomé and Príncipe Maritime Border Agreement
Agreement on the Delimitation of the Maritime Border between the Gabonese Republic and the Democratic Republic of São Tomé and Príncipe
- Type: Boundary delimitation
- Signed: 26 April 2001
- Location: São Tomé, São Tomé and Príncipe
- Parties: Gabon; São Tomé and Príncipe
- Depositary: United Nations Secretariat
- Languages: French; Portuguese

The Gabon – São Tomé and Príncipe Maritime Border Agreement is a 2001 treaty between Gabon and São Tomé and Príncipe which delimits the maritime boundary between the two countries.

The agreement was signed in São Tomé on 26 April 2001. The boundary set out by the text of the treaty is a relatively straight north–south line and is explicitly defined as an equidistant line between the islands of São Tomé and Príncipe and mainland Gabon. The boundary consists of five straight-line maritime segments defined by six individual coordinate points. The theoretical tripoint in the north—with Equatorial Guinea—and the theoretical tripoint in the south—with Cameroon—have not yet been established between the involved states.

The treaty is not yet in force because it has not yet been ratified by both countries. The full name of the treaty is Agreement on the Delimitation of the Maritime Border between the Gabonese Republic and the Democratic Republic of São Tomé and Príncipe.
