= Alcino Pinto =

São Toméan politician (died 2020)

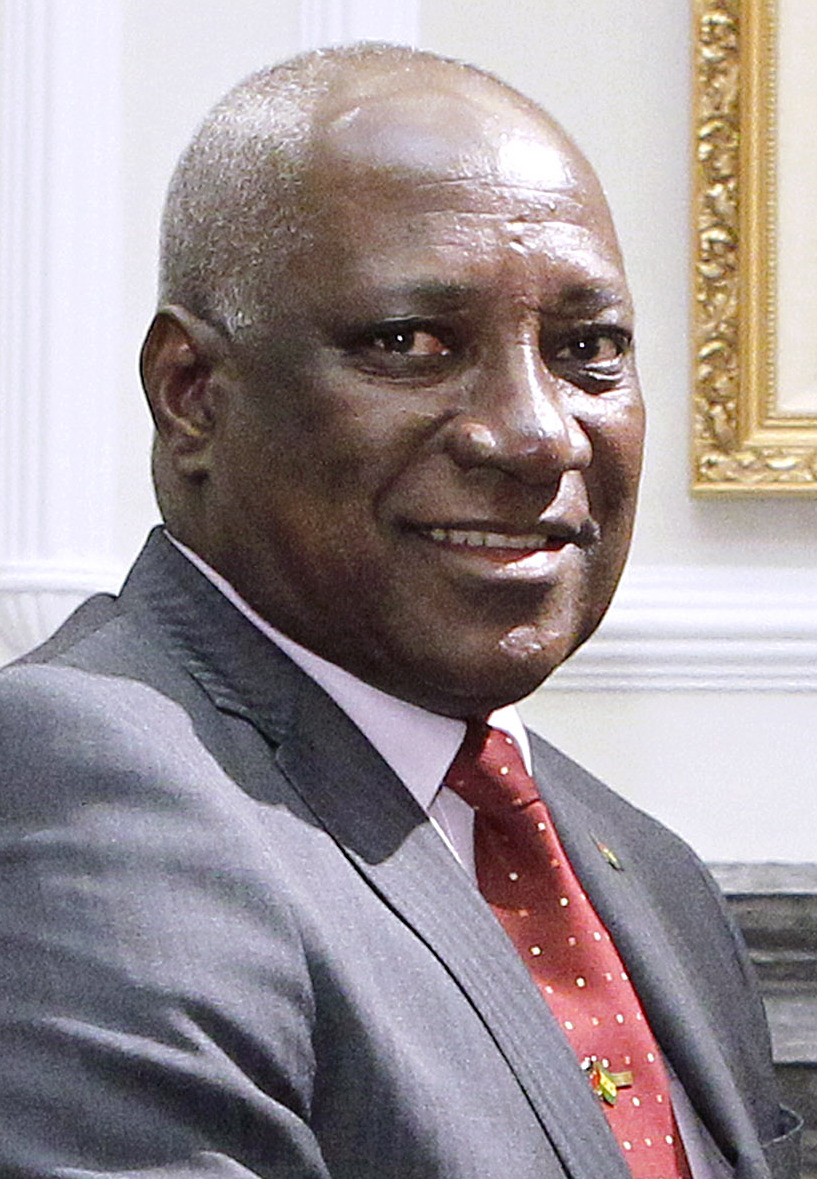

Minister of Public Works, Infrastructure, and Urban Development
- In office 28 November 2012 – 22 November 2014
- President: Manuel Pinto da Costa
- Prime Minister: Gabriel Costa
- Preceded by: Evaristo Carvalho (provisional)
- Succeeded by: José da Graca Diogo

Personal details
- Born: 1955/56
- Died: 19 November 2020 (aged 64)
- Spouse: Elsa Teixeira Pinto

Alcino Martino de Barros Pinto (1955/56 – 19 November 2020) was a São Toméan politician. He was President of the National Assembly of São Tomé and Príncipe from November 28, 2012 to November 22, 2014. He succeeded Evaristo Carvalho who was a provisional president and was succeeded by José da Graca Diogo.

Political offices
Preceded by Evaristo Carvalho (provisional)	President of the National Assembly of São Tomé and Príncipe; 2012–2014	Succeeded by José da Graca Diogo
