= 1973 São Toméan Legislative Assembly election =

- March 1973

Elections to a Legislative Assembly were held for the first and only time in Portuguese São Tomé and Príncipe in March 1973.

== Background ==
On 2 May 1972 the Portuguese National Assembly passed the Organic Law for the Overseas Territories, which provided for greater autonomy for overseas territories. São Tomé and Príncipe was to have a 16-member Legislative Assembly.

Candidates were required to be Portuguese citizens who had lived in São Tomé and Príncipe for more than three years and be literate in Portuguese. As the Portuguese constitution banned political parties at the time, the majority of candidates were put forward by the ruling People's National Action movement, although some civic associations were allowed to nominate candidates.

== Results ==
Out of a total population of 73,811, only 5,881 people registered to vote. A total of 4,781 people voted, giving a voter turnout of 81.2%.
