= São Tomé and Príncipe real =

The real was the currency of Portuguese São Tomé and Príncipe until 1914. It was equivalent to the Portuguese real. Coins were issued specifically for São Tomé and Príncipe until 1825 and banknotes were issued for the colony beginning in 1897. The real was replaced by the escudo at a rate of 1000 réis = 1 escudo.

== Coins ==
Until 1825, copper coins were issued in São Tomé and Príncipe for 20, 40 and 80 réis.

== Banknotes ==
In 1897, the Banco National Ultramarino introduced notes for 1000, 2000, 2500, 5000, 10,000 and 20,000 réis. Denominations of 50,000 réis notes were added in 1909.
