= Rei Amador =

Slave rebellion leader

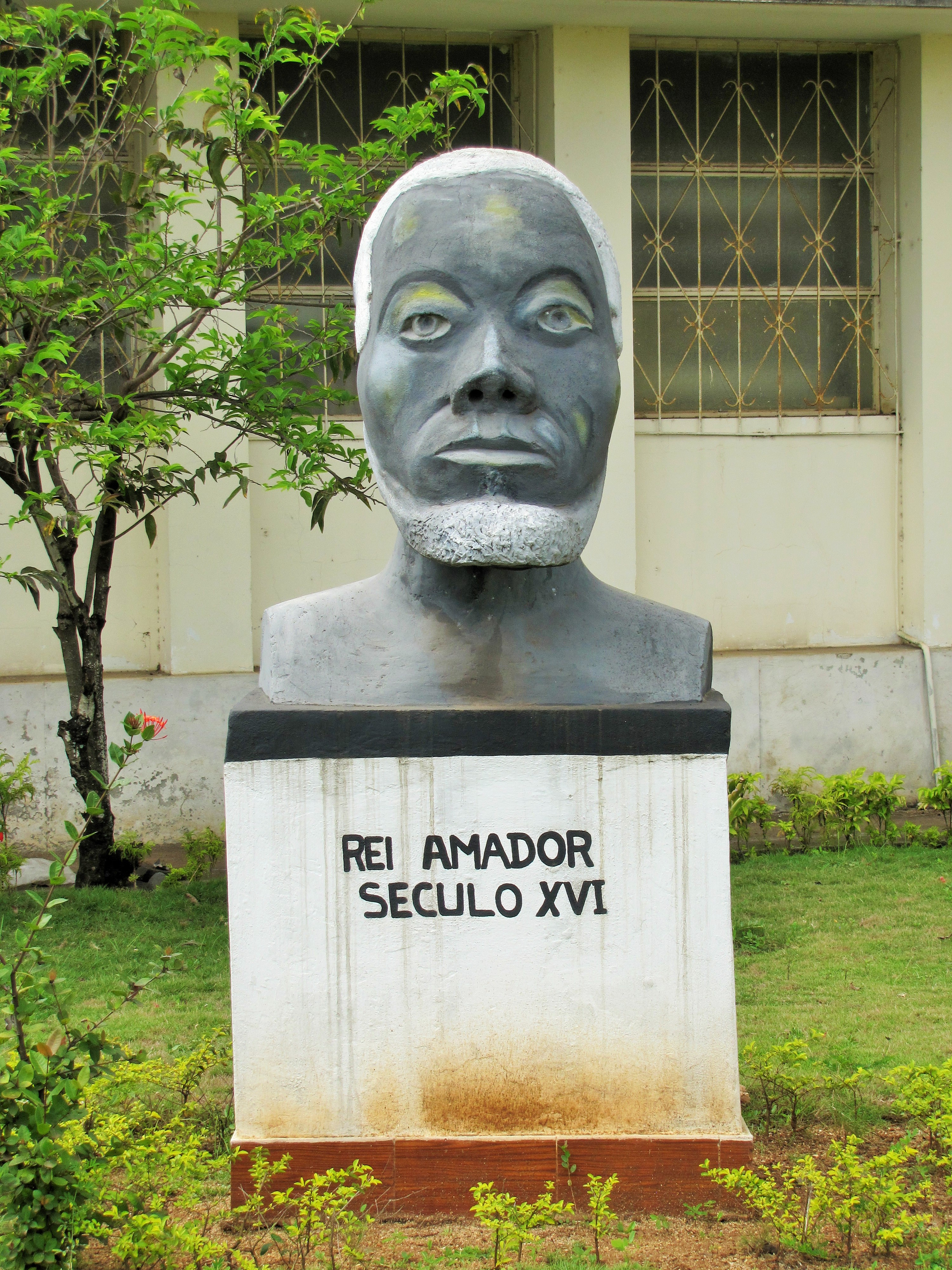
- Bust of Rei Amador
- Born: São Tomé Island
- Died: 1596; São Tomé Island
- Occupation: Slave rebel

Amador Vieira, best known as Rei Amador, was a member of the king of the Angolars and leader of a famous slave rebellion that took place in 1595 in the African islands of São Tomé and Príncipe. According to some historic documents, Rei Amador was "a slave" who avoided slavery and mobilized all the Angolares along with other Africans and made a free nation under the middle of the aforementioned islands.

== History of the Angolars in São Tomé and Príncipe ==
The history of the Angolars in São Tomé and Príncipe is central to the campaign of self-determination and independence carried out by Rei Amador. The Angolars inhabited the southern part of the island of São Tomé. How they originally came to dwell on the island is a matter of historical controversy; there are at least three competing explanations or narratives.

The first explanation of the origin of the São Tomé Angolars is that they survived a shipwreck off the south coast of São Tomé, while being transported as slaves, made their way on shore and formed their own communities.

A second, competing narrative is that the Angolars were former slaves who rebelled, fled and evaded their owners – after being taken to São Tomé. The former slaves created their own independent communities within the island. Each of these communities was known as a kilombo (or quilombo). In Kimbundu, one of the most spoken languages in Angola, kilombo originally and literally meant "war camp", but after borrowing into Portuguese, as quilombo, it came to include meanings such as "encampment", "settlement", "refuge", "community" and "population". These kilombos were usually in densely forested areas, far from the plantations. Sometimes the singular proper noun "Kilombo" is applied to the kilombos and the former slaves collectively, as a de facto union of independent states (or confederation), led by Rei Amador and others.

A third explanation claims that the Angolars migrated from African mainland to the islands of São Tomé and Príncipe, before the arrival of the Portuguese on the islands.

== Slave rebellion ==
On 9 July 1595, Rei Amador, and his people, the Angolars, allied with other enslaved Africans of its plantations, marched into the interior woods and battled against the Portuguese. It is said that day, Rei Amador and his followers raised a flag in front of the settlers and proclaimed Rei Amador as king of São Tomé and Príncipe, making himself as "Rei Amador, liberator of all the black people".

Between 1595 and 1596, the island of São Tomé was ruled by the Angolars, under the command of Rei Amador. On 4 January 1596, he was captured, sent to prison and was later executed by the Portuguese. Still today, they remember him fondly and consider him a national hero of the islands.

== Legacy ==
- In São Tomé and Príncipe, January 4 was declared a holiday in his honour, first celebrated in 2005.
- A football (soccer) club known as UDRA is named after him.
- Rei Amador was depicted in a 5,000 dobras note. Also all notes bear the portrait of Rei Amador on the obverse until late 2017. It is a contemporary creation attributed by the painter Pinásio Pina as there is no actual portraits of Rei Amador. Rei Amador was also featured in bank notes of Cape Verde.
- In 2004 during the International Year on the Battle Against Slavery and its Abolition, UN Secretary General Kofi Annan erected a statue of Rei Amador in São Tomé and Príncipe.
