= 1990 São Toméan constitutional referendum =

- 22 August 1990
- Are you in favor of the revised Constitution?

Results
Choice	Votes	%
Yes	38,100	95.36%
No	1,852	4.64%
Valid votes	39,952	94.38%
Invalid or blank votes	2,381	5.62%
Total votes	42,333	100.00%
Registered voters/turnout	52,917	80%

A constitutional referendum was held in São Tomé and Príncipe on 22 August 1990. The new constitution would introduce multi-party democracy for the first time since independence, as well as limiting the President to two terms. It was approved by 95% of voters. Parliamentary and presidential elections were held the following year.

== Results ==
Choice	Votes	%
For	38,100	95.36
Against	1,852	4.64
Total	39,952	100.00
Valid votes	39,952	94.38
Invalid/blank votes	2,381	5.62
Total votes	42,333	100.00
Registered voters/turnout	52,917	80.00
Source: African Elections Database
