= Central Bank of São Tomé and Príncipe =

Central Bank of São Tomé and Príncipe Banco Central de São Tomé e Príncipe

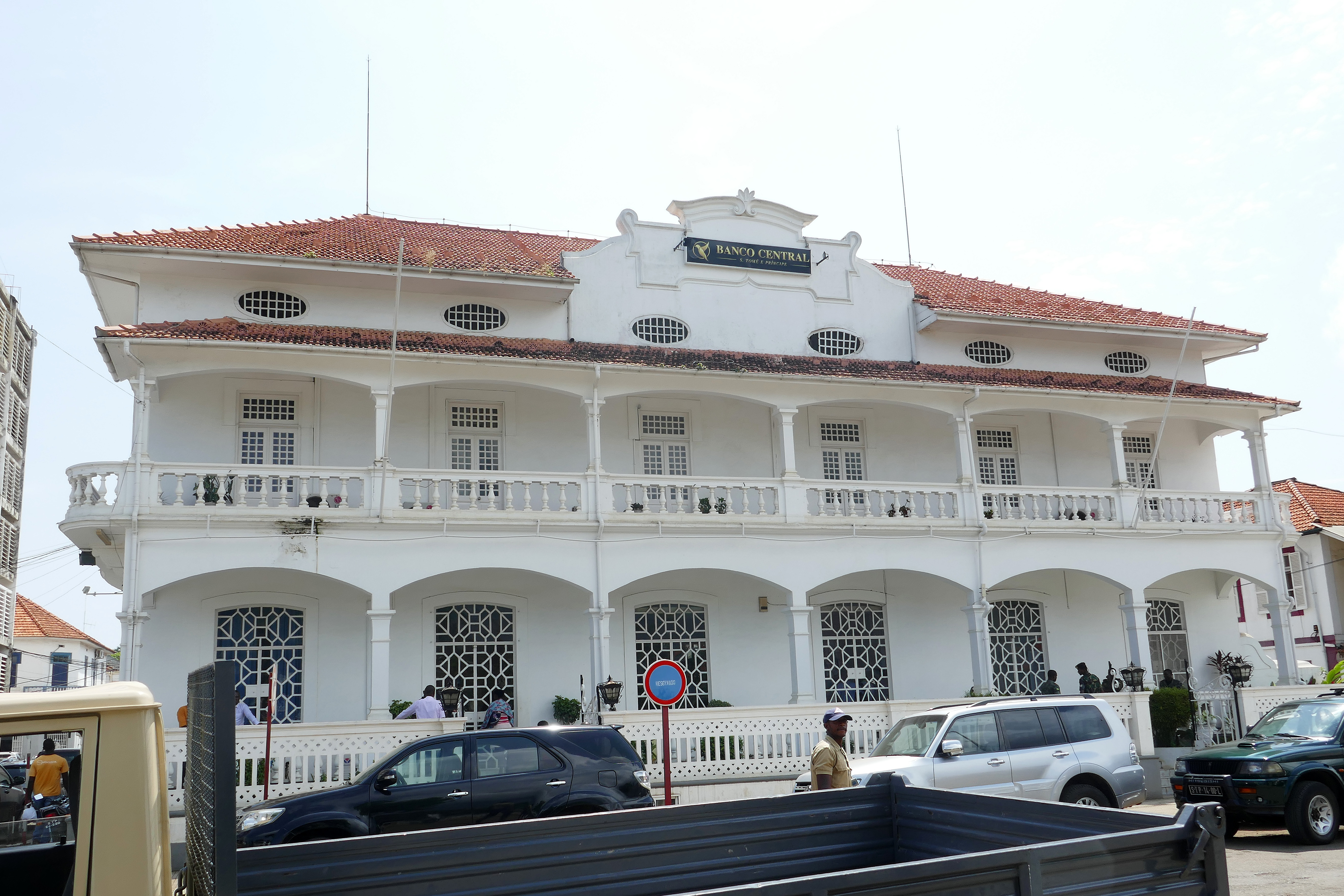
- Central bank of: São Tomé and Príncipe
- Headquarters: São Tomé
- Coordinates: 0°20′21″N 6°43′52″E
- Established: 24 May 1975
- Ownership: 100% state ownership
- Governor: Agostinho Fernandes
- Currency: Dobra; STN (ISO 4217)
- Reserves: US$70 million
- Website: www.bcstp.st

The Central Bank of São Tomé and Príncipe (Portuguese: Banco Central de São Tomé e Príncipe or BCSTP) is the central bank of São Tomé and Príncipe, a Portuguese-speaking island nation off the western equatorial coast of Central Africa.

== History ==
At independence in 1975, the government converted the local branch of the Portuguese colonial bank, Banco Nacional Ultramarino, into the National Bank of São Tomé and Príncipe, which took on the functions of central bank, development bank, and commercial bank. The government created a monobank by bringing the only other commercial bank in the country, the Banco Popular de Angola (formerly Banco Comercial de Angola and now Banco de Poupança e Crédito), under the control of Banco Nacional and by merging its savings bank, the Caixa de Crédito.

In 1992, a reform law resulted in the National Bank giving up its development and commercial banking functions, focusing on central banking. With that reform, the bank took on its present name. The successor bank for the commercial banking functions was Banco Internacional de São Tomé e Príncipe (BISTP).

== Governors ==
Governors of the National Bank since independence

- Victor Manuel Lopes Correia, 1976-1981
- Hildeberto Mário do Nascimento Séca, 1981-1983
- Prudêncio Rita de Oliveira Rita, 1983-1988
- Manuel de Nazaré Mendes, 1988-1992

Since the reform, passed on 24 August 1992, the bank had eight central governors:

- Adelino Castelo David, 1992–1994
- Carlos Quaresma Batista de Sousa, 1995–1999
- Maria do Carmo Silveira, 1999–2006
- Arlindo Afonso Carvalho, 2006–2008
- Luís Fernando Moreira de Sousa, 2009–2011
- Maria do Carmo Silveira, 2011–2016
- Hélio Silva Vaz de Almeida, 2016–2019
- Américo Barros, 2019–2022
- Américo Ramos, 2022–2025
- Agostinho Fernandes, 2025–

== See also ==
- Ministry of Finance and Planning (São Tomé and Príncipe)
- Economy of São Tomé and Príncipe
- List of central banks of Africa
- List of central banks
