= COVID-19 pandemic in São Tomé and Príncipe =

- Disease: COVID-19
- Pathogen: SARS-CoV-2
- Location: São Tomé and Príncipe
- Arrival date: 12 April 2020 (6 years, 4 months and 1 week)
- Confirmed cases: 6,771 (updated 5 Aug 2026)
- Deaths: 80 (updated 5 Aug 2026)
- Fatality rate: 1.18%
- Vaccinations: Updated 5 Aug 2026: 140,256 (total vaccinated); 111,986 (fully vaccinated); 263,863 (doses administered)

Government website
- covid.ms.gov.st Government of São Tomé and Príncipe via Facebook

The COVID-19 pandemic in São Tomé and Príncipe is part of the worldwide pandemic of coronavirus disease 2019 (COVID-19) caused by severe acute respiratory syndrome coronavirus 2 (SARS-CoV-2). The virus was confirmed to have reached São Tomé and Príncipe on 6 April 2020. The first death was recorded on 30 April.

On 12 January 2020, the World Health Organization (WHO) confirmed that a novel coronavirus was the cause of a respiratory illness in a cluster of people in Wuhan City, Hubei Province, China, which was reported to the WHO on 31 December 2019.

The case fatality ratio for COVID-19 has been much lower than SARS of 2003, but the transmission has been significantly greater, with a significant total death toll. Model-based simulations indicate that the 95% confidence interval for the time-varying reproduction number R_{t} of São Tomé and Príncipe was below 1.0 in May and June 2020 but has since increased to around 1.

== Timeline ==
=== April to June 2020 ===
- On 6 April, the first four cases in the country were confirmed.
- On 30 April, the first death was reported. At the time, São Tomé and Príncipe had 16 cases, four of which had recovered and one of which had died. The deceased was a 55-year-old man living in Cantalago. There were 11 active cases.
- In May there were 279 new cases and 9 deaths, bringing the total number of confirmed cases to 295 and the death toll to 10.
- In June there were 99 new cases and one death, bringing the total number of confirmed cases to 394 and the death toll to 11.

=== July to September 2020 ===
- There were 477 new cases and four deaths in July, bringing the total number of confirmed cases to 871 and the death toll to 15. There were 78 active cases at the end of the month.
- There were 25 new cases in August, bringing the total number of confirmed cases to 896. The death toll remained unchanged. There were 30 active cases at the end of the month.
- There were 15 new cases in September, bringing the total number of cases to 911. The death toll remained unchanged. The number of recovered patients increased to 885, leaving 11 active cases at the end of the month.

=== October to December 2020 ===
- There were 34 new cases in October, bringing the total number of cases to 945. The death toll increased to 16. The number of recovered patients increased to 904, leaving 25 active cases at the end of the month.
- There were 46 new cases in November, bringing the total number of cases to 991. The death toll rose to 17. The number of recovered patients increased to 933, leaving 41 active cases at the end of the month.
- There were 23 new cases in December, taking the total number of cases to 1014. The death toll remained unchanged. The number of recovered patients increased to 971, leaving 26 active cases at the end of the month.

=== 2021 ===
- Vaccinations started on 15 March, initially with 24,000 doses of the Oxford–AstraZeneca COVID-19 vaccine obtained through COVAX.
- There were 2,883 confirmed cases in 2021, bringing the total number of cases to 3,897. 2,707 patients recovered in 2021 while 40 persons died, bringing the total death toll to 57. At the end of 2021 there were 162 active cases.
- Modelling by the Regional WHO Office for Africa suggests that due to under-reporting, the true cumulative number of infections by the end of 2021 was around one hundred thousand, and that the true number of COVID-19 deaths was around 76.

=== 2022 ===
- There were 2,382 confirmed cases in 2022, bringing the total number of cases to 6,279. 2,524 patients recovered in 2022 while 20 persons died, bringing the total death toll to 77. At the end of 2022 there were no active cases.

=== 2023 ===
- There were 466 confirmed cases in 2023, bringing the total number of cases to 6,745. 461 patients recovered in 2023 while 3 persons died, bringing the total death toll to 80. At the end of 2023 there were 2 active cases.

== Prevention ==
In order to prevent the spread of the virus, the government has put in place various travel restrictions and quarantining measures.

== Economic impact ==
Tourism accounts for more than 20% of employment in the country, and with activity in the sector coming to a near-halt, the economic impact has been severe.

== Cases by islands ==
Island	Cases	Deaths	Recovered
Principe	408	4	404
São Tomé	5,540	69	5,468
2/2	5,948	73	5,872
Last update 16 April 2022

== See also ==
- COVID-19 pandemic in Africa
- COVID-19 pandemic by country and territory
