= Américo Ramos =

Prime Minister of São Tomé and Príncipe since 2025

- Ramos in 2025

19th Prime Minister of São Tomé and Príncipe
- Incumbent
- Assumed office 12 January 2025
- President: Carlos Vila Nova
- Preceded by: Ilza Amado Vaz

President of Independent Democratic Action
- Incumbent
- Assumed office 27 June 2026
- Preceded by: Patrice Trovoada

Governor of the Central Bank
- In office 2 December 2022 – 12 January 2025
- Nominated by: Patrice Trovoada
- Preceded by: Américo Barros
- Succeeded by: Agostinho Fernandes

Minister of Finance
- In office 25 December 2014 – 3 December 2018
- Prime Minister: Patrice Trovoada
- Preceded by: Hélio de Almeida
- Succeeded by: Osvaldo Vaz
- In office 14 August 2010 – 12 December 2012
- Prime Minister: Patrice Trovoada
- Preceded by: Ângela Viegas Santiago
- Succeeded by: Hélio de Almeida

Personal details
- Party: ADI
- Education: Moscow State University

Américo d'Oliveira dos Ramos is a São Toméan banker and politician who has served as the prime minister of São Tomé and Príncipe since 12 January 2025. He previously served as the governor of the Central Bank of São Tomé and Príncipe, and he has also worked for the Ministry of Finance.

== Biography ==
From São Tomé and Príncipe, Ramos studied abroad at Moscow State University in Russia, where he received a degree in economics after having attended from 1989 to 1995. He then returned to São Tomé and joined the Ministry of Finance, where he worked as a budget technician from 1995 to 1998. He then worked as head of the expenditure department from 1998 to 2000, head of the budget department from 2000 to 2001, budget director from 2001 to 2009, and director of the treasury from 2009 to 2010. In 2010, Ramos became the São Tomé Minister of Finance, a position he held until 2012. He was re-appointed to the post in 2014 and served until 2018, then becoming an economic advisor to President Evaristo de Carvalho in 2019.

Ramos was arrested in 2019 and detained for three months, charged with corruption, money laundering and other crimes. After he spent three months in the country's central prison, he was acquitted by the public prosecutor's office.

In December 2022, Ramos was appointed governor of the Central Bank of São Tomé and Príncipe. On 6 January 2025, President Carlos Vila Nova dissolved the government of prime minister Patrice Trovoada, for a "remarkable inability to resolve the country's many challenges," and ordered the Independent Democratic Action (ADI) party to present candidates for prime minister within 72 hours. Trovoada responded calling his dismissal "illegal" and "unconstitutional". On 9 January, the president selected Ilza Amado Vaz to be the next prime minister. However, just three days later, on 12 January, she announced her resignation from the office. After Amado Vaz's resignation, the ADI party nominated Adelino Pereira, a former attorney general, to be the next prime minister. However, instead of Pereira, Vila Nova announced on 12 January that he was appointing Ramos to be the next prime minister.

Since the collapse of Trovoada's government, the ADI has been mired in a leadership crisis, split between Trovoada’s faction and a faction led current Prime Minister Américo Ramos backed by Carlos Vila Nova. The Supreme Court of Justice declared that the president's firing of the cabinet was unconstitutional and outside the head of state's powers but it wouldn't have any retroactive effect rendering the decision meaningless. The majority of the parliament made up of ADI adopted a resolution to keep Ramos in power ahead of the presidential and parliamentary elections.

On 27 June 2026, Ramos and his faction within ADI organized an extraordinary congress at which Ramos declared himself the new leader of ADI. The legitimacy of the congress and Ramos’s leadership was affirmed in a ruling issued by the Constitutional Court the following month.

Despite his party finishing second in the 2026 parliamentary election, Ramos was reappointed to another term as prime minister by President Vila Nova on 12 November 2026.
