= History of São Tomé and Príncipe =

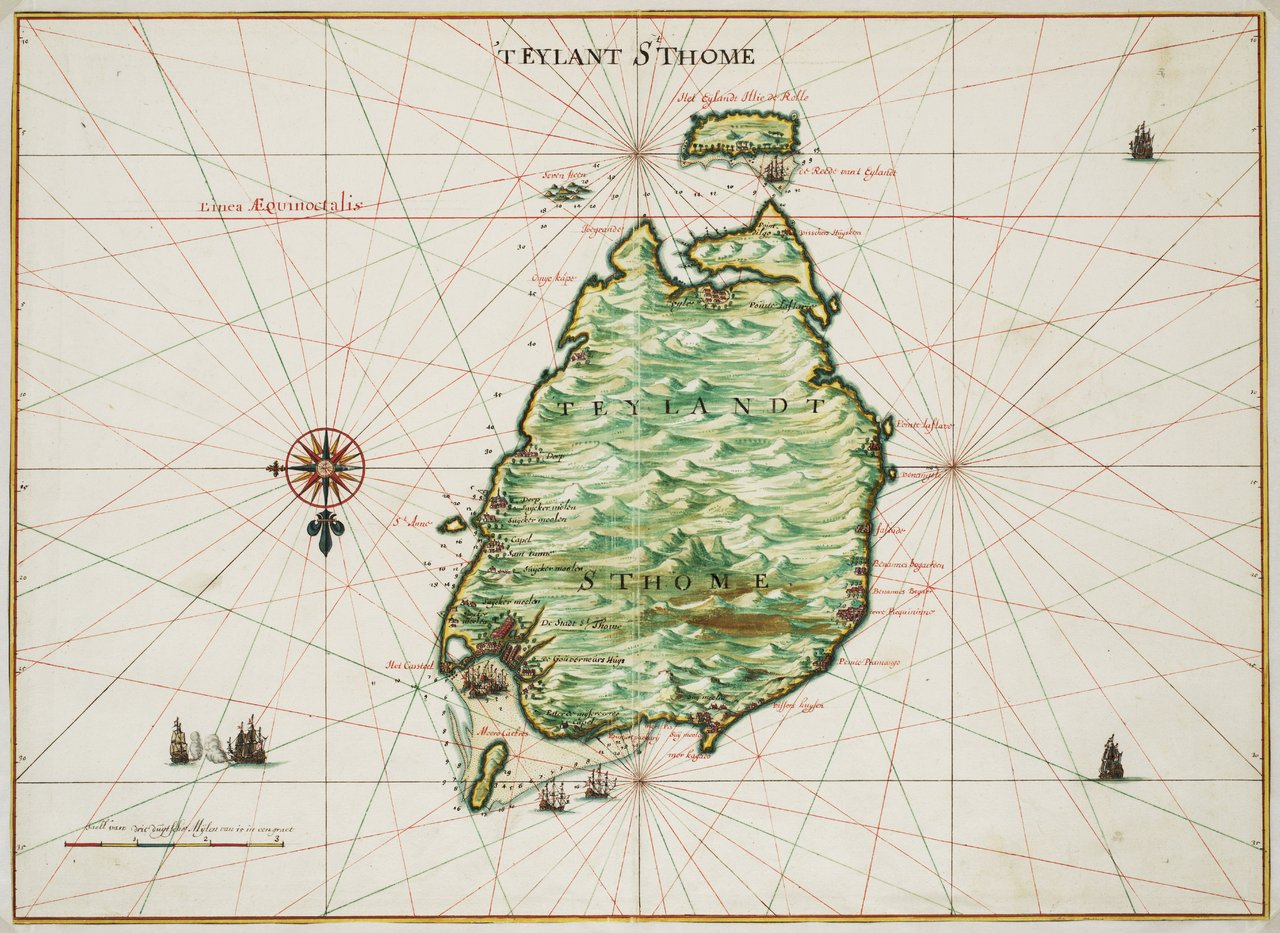
Map of São Tomé by Johannes Vingboons (1665).

Coat of Arms of colonial São Tomé and Príncipe

The islands of São Tomé and Príncipe were uninhabited at the time of the arrival of the Portuguese sometime between 1469 and 1471. After the islands were discovered by the explorers João de Santarém and Pero Escobar, Portuguese navigators explored the islands and decided they would be a good location for bases to trade with the mainland.

== Portuguese administration ==
The first successful settlement of São Tomé was established in 1493 by Álvaro Caminha, who received the land as a grant from the crown. Príncipe was settled in 1500 under a similar arrangement. Attracting settlers proved difficult, however, and most of the earliest inhabitants were "undesirables" sent from Portugal, mostly forcibly deported Jews. In time, these settlers found the excellent volcanic soil of the region suitable for agriculture, especially the growing of sugar.

The cultivation of sugar was a labor-intensive process, and the Portuguese began to import large numbers of slaves from the African mainland. By the mid-16th century, the Portuguese settlers had turned the islands into Africa's foremost exporter of sugar. São Tomé and Príncipe were taken over and administered by the Portuguese crown in 1522 and 1573, respectively.

However, superior sugar colonies in the Western Hemisphere had begun to hurt the islands. The large slave population also proved difficult to control with Portugal unable to invest many resources in the effort. As well, the Dutch captured and occupied São Tomé for seven years in 1641, razing over 70 sugar mills. Sugar cultivation thus declined over the next 100 years, and by the mid-17th century, the economy of São Tomé had changed. It was now primarily a transit point for ships engaged in the slave trade between the West and continental Africa.

In the early 19th century, two new cash crops, coffee and cocoa, were introduced. The rich volcanic soils proved well suited to the new cash crop industry, and soon extensive plantations (roças), owned by Portuguese companies or absentee landlords, occupied almost all of the good farmland. By 1908, São Tomé had become the world's largest producer of cocoa, which still is the country's most important crop.

The roças system, which gave the plantation managers a high degree of authority, led to abuses against the African farm workers. Although Portugal officially abolished slavery in 1876, the practice of forced paid labor continued. In the early 20th century, an internationally publicized controversy arose over charges that Angolan contract workers were being subjected to forced labor and unsatisfactory working conditions. During the Great Depression, worker exploitation worsened.

Sporadic labor unrest and dissatisfaction continued well into the 20th century, culminating in an outbreak of riots in 1953 in which several hundred African laborers were killed in a clash with their Portuguese rulers, now known as the Batepá Massacre which remains a major event in the colonial history of the islands; its anniversary is officially observed by the government.

During the 1967–70 Nigerian Civil War, São Tomé served as the major base of operations for the Biafran airlift. The airlift was an international humanitarian relief effort (the largest civilian airlift to date) that transported food and medicine to eastern Nigeria. It is estimated to have saved more than a million lives.

== Movement towards independence ==
By the late 1950s, when other emerging nations across the African Continent were demanding independence, a small group of São Toméans had formed the Movement for the Liberation of São Tomé and Príncipe (MLSTP), which eventually established its base in nearby Gabon. Picking up momentum in the 1960s, events moved quickly after the overthrow of the Caetano dictatorship in Portugal in April 1974. The new Portuguese regime was committed to the dissolution of its overseas colonies; in November 1974, their representatives met with the MLSTP in Algiers and worked out an agreement for the transfer of sovereignty. After a period of transitional government, São Tomé and Príncipe achieved independence on July 12, 1975, choosing as its first president the MLSTP Secretary General Manuel Pinto da Costa.

== Modern São Tomé and Príncipe ==
In 1990, São Tomé became one of the first African countries to embrace democratic reform and changes to the constitution—the legalization of opposition political parties—led to elections in 1991 that were nonviolent, free, and transparent. Miguel Trovoada, a former prime minister who had been in exile since 1986, returned as an independent candidate and was elected president. Trovoada was re-elected in São Tomé's second multiparty presidential election in 1996. The Party of Democratic Convergence (PCD) toppled the MLSTP to take a majority of seats in the National Assembly, with the MLSTP becoming an important and vocal minority party. Municipal elections followed in late 1992, in which the MLSTP came back to win a majority of seats on five of seven regional councils. In early legislative elections in October 1994, the MLSTP won a plurality of seats in the Assembly. It regained an outright majority of seats in the November 1998 elections. The Government of São Tomé fully functions under a multiparty system. Presidential elections were held in July 2001. The candidate backed by the Independent Democratic Action party, Fradique de Menezes, was elected in the first round and inaugurated on September 3. Parliamentary elections were held in March 2002. For the next four years, a series of short-lived, opposition-led governments were formed.

The army seized power for a week in July 2003, complaining of corruption and that forthcoming oil revenues would not be divided fairly. An accord was negotiated under which President de Menezes was returned to office.

The cohabitation period ended in March 2006, when a pro-presidential coalition won enough seats in National Assembly elections to form and head a new government.

In the 30 July 2006 presidential election, Fradique de Menezes easily won a second five-year term in office, defeating two other candidates Patrice Trovoada (son of former president Miguel Trovoada) and independent Nilo Guimarães. Local elections, the first since 1992, took place on 27 August 2006 and were dominated by members of the ruling coalition.

Evaristo Carvalho was the President of São Tomé and Príncipe since the 2016 elections, after defeating incumbent President Manuel Pinto da Costa. President Carvalho is also Vice president of the Independent Democratic Action party (ADI). Patrice Emery Trovoada, the leader of the Independent Democratic Action party (ADI), was prime minister from 2014 to 2018. In December 2018, Jorge Bom Jesus, the leader of the Movimento de Libertação de São Tomé e Príncipe-Partido Social Democráta (MLSTP-PSD), was sworn in as prime minister. In September 2021, the candidate of the centre-right opposition Independent Democratic Action (ADI), Carlos Vila Nova, won the presidential election. The president is largely ceremonial figure, as the political power lies with the prime minister. In September 2022, the opposition Independent Democratic Action (ADI), led by former prime minister Patrice Trovoada, won the election over the ruling Movement for the Liberation of Sao Tomé and Principe/Social Democratic Party (MLSTP/PSD) of Prime Minister Jorge Bom Jesus. On 11 November 2022, Patrice Trovoada was appointed Prime Minister of São Tomé and Príncipe by the President of the Republic of São Tomé, Carlos Vila Nova. On 25 November 2022, there was a failed coup attempt. On 12 January 2025, Americo D'Oliveira dos Ramos became new prime minister of Sao Tomé and Principe.

== See also ==
- History of Africa
- Politics of São Tomé and Príncipe
- List of heads of state of São Tomé and Príncipe
- List of heads of government of São Tomé and Príncipe
- Religion in São Tomé and Príncipe
