= List of people from São Tomé and Príncipe =

This is a list of notable people from São Tomé and Príncipe.

== Literature ==
- Caetano da Costa Alegre
- Olinda Beja
- Guadalupe de Ceita
- Sara Pinto Coelho
- Alda Neves da Graça do Espírito Santo
- Conceição Lima
- Manuela Margarido
- Inocência Mata
- Francisco José Tenreiro

== Music ==
=== Bands ===
- África Negra
- Calema

=== Singers/Musicians ===
- Camilo Domingos
- Filipe Santo
- José Vianna da Motta
- Calema

== Politics ==
- Armindo Vaz d'Almeida
- Manuel Quintas de Almeida
- Leonel Mário d'Alva
- Carlos Gustavo dos Anjos
- Alda Bandeira
- Hélder Barros
- Jorge Bom Jesus
- Albertino Bragança
- Joaquim Rafael Branco
- Evaristo Carvalho
- João Paulo Cassandra
- José Cassandra
- Celestino Rocha da Costa
- Gabriel Costa
- Manuel Pinto da Costa
- Natália Pedro da Costa Umbelina Neto
- Raul Cravid
- Damião Vaz d'Almeida
- Daniel Daio
- Adelino Castelo David
- Elsa Garrido
- Maria do Nascimento da Graça Amorim
- Carlos Graça
- Julieta da Graça do Espírito Santo
- Gareth Guadalupe
- Nilo Guimarães
- Maria Aurora Lopes
- Adelino Lucas
- Fradique de Menezes
- Raul Bragança Neto
- Delfim Neves
- Maria das Neves
- Ovídio Manuel Barbosa Pequeno
- Lurdes de Maria Lima Pires dos Santos
- Leonel Pontes
- Fernanda Pontífice
- Célia Posser
- Guilherme Posser da Costa
- Zeferino dos Prazeres
- Mateus Meira Rita
- Celmira Sacramento
- Valdimira da Silva Tavares
- Maria do Carmo Silveira
- Óscar Sousa
- Maria Tebús
- Elsa Teixeira Pinto
- Edite Tenjua
- Carlos Tiny
- Maria Tomé
- Miguel Trovoada
- Patrice Trovoada
- Tomé Vera Cruz
- Carlos Vila Nova

== Sports ==
- Naide Gomes
- D'Jamila Tavares
