= List of São Toméan politicians =

The following is a list of São Toméan politicians, both past and present.

== A ==
- Norberto d'Alva Costa Alegre
- Armindo Vaz d'Almeida
- Damião Vaz d'Almeida
- Leonel Mário d'Alva
- Maria do Nascimento da Graça Amorim
- Carlos Gustavo dos Anjos

== B ==
- Alda Bandeira
- Albertino Bragança
- Raul Bragança
- Joaquim Rafael Branco

== C ==
- Evaristo Carvalho
- João Paulo Cassandra
- José Cassandra
- Celestino Rocha da Costa
- Gabriel Costa
- Guilherme Posser da Costa
- Manuel Pinto da Costa
- Tomé Vera Cruz

== D ==
- Daniel Lima dos Santos Daio
- Dionísio Tomé Dias

== F ==
- Albertino da Boa Morte Francisco

== G ==
- Carlos da Graça

== M ==
- Fradique de Menezes

== N ==
- Maria das Neves

== P ==
- Ovídio Manuel Barbosa Pequeno
- Francisco Fortunato Pires
- Zeferino dos Prazeres

== R ==
- Mateus Meira Rita

== S ==
- Homero Jeronimo Salvaterra
- Paulo Jorge Espirito Santo
- Francisco da Silva
- Maria do Carmo Silveira
- Óscar Sousa

== T ==
- Maria Tebús
- Maria de Jesus Trovoada dos Santos
- Miguel Trovoada
- Patrice Trovoada
