= Council of Ministers of São Tomé and Príncipe =

The São Tomé and Príncipe Council of Ministers consists of thirteen members appointed by the president with the advice of the prime minister.

The Council of Ministers is chaired by the prime minister and is tasked with managing government operations. It is held accountable by the president and the National Assembly.

== Members ==
Current Council of Ministers since 12 January 2025:

government members
Name	Office
Américo Ramos	Prime Minister
Ilza Amado Vaz	Minister of State for Foreign Affairs, Cooperation and Communities
Gareth Guadalupe	Minister of State for Economy and Finance
Horácio Castro da Trindade de Sousa	Minister of Defence and Internal Order
Vera Maria Assunção Gomes Cravid	Minister of Justice, Parliamentary Affairs and Women's Rights
Nelson Mário de Carvalho Rosa Cardoso	Minister of Infrastructure and Natural Resources
Nilda Borges da Mata	Minister of Environment, Youth and Sustainable Tourism
Nilton Garrido de Sousa Pontes	Minister of Agriculture, Fisheries and Rural Development
Isabel Maria Correia Viegas de Abreu	Minister of Education, Culture, Science and Higher Education
Celso Vaz do Nascimento Matos	Minister of Health
Joucerli Tiny dos Ramos	Minister of Labour, Solidarity and Social Security

== Past cabinets ==
=== XI Constitutional Government (2006–2008) ===
government members
Name	Office
Tomé Vera Cruz	Prime Minister
Maria Tebus	Deputy Prime Minister; Minister of Planning and Finance
Óscar Sousa	Minister of Defence and Internal Order
Cristina Dias	Minister of Economy
Maria de Fátima Leite	Minister of Education, Culture, Youth and Sports
Carlos Gustavo dos Anjos	Minister of Foreign Affairs and Cooperation
Arlindo de Carvalho	Minister of Health
Justino Veiga	Minister of Justice, Public Administration, State Reform and Parliamentary Affairs
Manuel de Deus Lima	Minister of Natural Resources and Environment
Delfim Neves	Minister of Public Works
Armindo Aguiar	Minister of Territorial Administration, Culture and Social Communication
Maria de Cristo Carvalho	Minister of Labour, Solidarity, Women and Family
Argentino Pires dos Santos	Secretary of State for Agriculture, Fisheries and Rural Development

=== XII Constitutional Government (2008) ===
government members
Name	Office
Patrice Trovoada	Prime Minister
Valdimira da Silva Tavares	Minister of Agriculture and Rural Development
Óscar Sousa	Minister of Defence and Internal Order
Mariana Rute Leal	Minister of Education, Culture, Youth and Sport
Ovídio Manuel Barbosa Pequeno	Minister of Foreign Affairs, Cooperation and Communities
Martinho do Nascimento	Minister of Health
José Carlos Barreiro	Minister of Justice and Parliamentary Affairs
Maria Tomé	Minister of Labour and Solidarity
José da Graça Diogo	Minister of Natural Resources and Environment
Raul Cravid	Minister of Planning and Finance
Maria da Cristo Hilário dos Santos Raposo Costa de Carvalho	Minister of Public Administration, State Reform and Territorial Administration
Arzemiro dos Prazeres	Minister of Public Works, Infrastructure and Urban Development
Francisco Rita	Minister of Trade, Industry and Tourism
Adelino Lucas	Secretary of State for Social Communication

=== XIII Constitutional Government (2008–2010) ===
government members
Name	Office
Joaquim Rafael Branco	Prime Minister
Elsa Pinto	Minister of National Defence
Carlos Tiny	Minister of Foreign Affairs
Jorge Bom Jesus	Minister of Education and Culture
Celestino Andrade	Minister of Commerce, Industry and Tourism
Ângela Viegas Santiago	Minister of Finance
Arzemiro dos Prazeres	Minister of Public Works, Infrastructure, Transportation and Communications
Arlindo de Carvalho	Minister of Health
Maria de Cristo Carvalho	Minister of Social Communication, Youth and Sports
Justino Veiga	Minister of Justice, State Reform, Public Administration and Parliamentary Affairs
Raul Cravid	Minister of Internal Administration
Cristina Dias	Minister of Natural Resources, Energy and Environment

=== XIV Constitutional Government (2010–2012) ===
government members
Name	Office
Patrice Trovoada	Prime Minister
Manuel Salvador dos Ramos	Minister of Foreign Affairs
Arlindo Ramos	Minister of Parliamentary Affairs and Decentralisation
Carlos Olímpio Stock	Minister of Defence and Public Security
Abénildo d'Oliveira	Minister of Education, Culture and Training
Américo dos Ramos	Minister of Finance and National Cooperation
Elísio Teixeira	Minister of Justice and State Reform
Agostinho Fernandes	Minister of Planning and Development
Ângela Pinheiro	Minister of Health and Social Affairs
Carlos Vila Nova	Minister of Public Works and Natural Resources
Afonso Varela	Minister Secretary-General of the Government

=== XV Constitutional Government (2012–2014) ===
government members
Name	Office
Gabriel Costa	Prime Minister
Natália Pedro da Costa Umbelina Neto	Minister of Foreign Affairs and Communities
Óscar Sousa	Minister of Defence and Internal Order
Edite Ramos da Costa Tenjua	Minister of Justice, Public Administration and Parliamentary Affairs
Hélio Silva Vaz d'Almeida	Minister of Finance
António Álvaro da Graça Dias	Minister of Agriculture, Fisheries and Rural Development
Osvaldo Cravid Viegas d'Abreu	Minister of Public Works and Infrastructure, Natural Resources and Environment
Leonel Pontes	Minister of Health and Social Affairs
Demóstene Vasconcelos Pires dos Santos	Minister of Tourism, Commerce and Industries
Jorge Bom Jesus	Minister of Education and Culture
Danilson Alcántara Fernandes Cotú	Minister of Youth and Sport

=== XVI Constitutional Government (2014–2018) ===
government members
Name	Office
Patrice Trovoada	Prime Minister
Afonso Varela	Minister of the Presidency of the Council of Ministers and Parliamentary Affairs
Manuel Salvador dos Ramos	Minister of Foreign Affairs and Communities
Carlos Olímpio Stock	Minister of Defence and the Sea
Arlindo Ramos	Minister of Internal Administration
Roberto Raposo	Minister of Justice and Human Rights
Agostinho Fernandes	Minister of Economy and International Cooperation
Américo dos Ramos	Minister of Finance and Public Administration
Carlos Vila Nova	Minister of Infrastructure, Natural Resources and Environment
Teodorico Campos	Minister of Agriculture and Rural Development
Olinto Daio	Minister of Education, Culture and Science
Carlos Gomes	Minister of Employment and Social Affairs
Maria de Jesus Trovoada dos Santos	Minister of Health
Marcelino Leal Sanches	Minister of Youth and Sports

=== XVII Constitutional Government (2018–2022) ===
government members
Name	Office
Jorge Bom Jesus	Prime Minister
Elsa Pinto	Minister of Foreign Affairs, Cooperation and Communities
Osvaldo D'Abreu	Minister of Public Works, Infrastructure, Natural Resources and Environment
Osvaldo Vaz	Minister of Planning, Finance and Blue Economy
Óscar Sousa	Minister of Defence and Internal Order
Ivete da Graça Correia	Minister of Justice, Public Administration and Human Rights
Francisco Martins dos Ramos	Minister of Agriculture, Fisheries and Rural Development
Wuando Castro	Minister of the Presidency of the Council of Ministers and Parliamentary Affairs
Julieta Izidro Rodrigues	Minister of Education and Higher Education
Maria da Graça Lavres	Minister of Tourism, Culture, Commerce and Industry
Edgar Neves	Minister of Health
Adlander Costa Matos	Minister of Labour, Solidarity, Family and Vocational Training
Vinícius Xavier de Pina	Minister of Youth, Sport and Entrepreneurship

=== XVIII Constitutional Government (2022–2025) ===
government members
Name	Office
Patrice Trovoada	Prime Minister
Ilza Amado Vaz	Minister of Justice, Public Administration and Human Rights
Gareth Santo Guadalupe	Minister of the Presidency of the Council of Ministers and Parliamentary Affairs
Alberto Neto Pereira	Minister of Foreign Affairs, Cooperation and Communities
Jorge Amado	Minister of Defence and Internal Administration
Abel Bom Jesus	Minister of Agriculture, Rural Development and Fisheries
Genésio da Mata	Minister of Planning, Finance and Blue Economy
Celsio Junqueira	Minister of Health, Labour and Social Affairs
Isabel de Abreu	Minister of Education, Culture and Science
Adelino Rosa Cardoso	Minister of Infrastructure, Natural Resources and Environment
Eurídice Medeiros	Minister of Youth and Sport
Maria Pina Delgado	Minister of Women's Rights

=== Proposed cabinet of Ilza Amado Vaz (2025) ===
The following cabinet was proposed by Prime Minister-designate Ilza Amado Vaz in January 2025 but was never formally appointed. Vaz was appointed prime minister on 9 January 2025 and resigned 3 days later on 12 January after the proposed composition of her government was made public before it was formally presented to the President.

proposed government members
Name	Office
Ilza Amado Vaz	Prime Minister-designate
Gareth Guadalupe	Minister of State for Economy and Finance
Alberto Neto Pereira	Minister of Foreign Affairs, Cooperation and Communities
Jorge Amado	Minister of Defence and Internal Order
Vera Maria Assunção Gomes Cravid	Minister of Justice, Public Administration and Human Rights
Nelson Mário de Carvalho Rosa Cardoso	Minister of Infrastructure and Natural Resources
Nilda Borges da Mata	Minister of Environment, Youth and Tourism
Nilton Garrido de Sousa Pontes	Minister of Agriculture, Fisheries and Rural Development
Isabel Maria Correia Viegas de Abreu	Minister of Education, Culture, Science and Higher Education
Celso Vaz do Nascimento Matos	Minister of Health
Joucerli Tiny dos Ramos	Minister of Labour, Solidarity and Social Security
