= XII Constitutional Government of São Tomé and Príncipe =

The XII Constitutional Government of São Tomé and Príncipe (Portuguese: XII Governo Constitucional de São Tomé e Príncipe) was a Government of São Tomé and Príncipe. It was established in February 2008 and was disestablished in May 2008.

XII Constitutional Government of São Tomé and Príncipe
Office	Office-holder	Term	Party
Prime Minister	Patrice Trovoada		ADI
Minister of Agriculture and Rural Development	Valdimira da Silva Tavares		
Minister of Defence and Internal Order	Oscar Sousa		
Minister of Education, Culture, Youth, and Sport	Mariana Rute Leal		
Minister of Foreign Affairs, Cooperation, and Communities	Ovidio Manuel Barbosa Pequeno		
Minister of Health	Martinho do Nascimento		ADI
Minister of Justice and Parliamentary Affairs	Jose Carlos Barreiro		
Minister of Labor and Solidarity	Maria Tome		
Minister of Natural Resources and Environment	Jose da Graca Diogo		
Minister of Planning and Finance	Raul Cravid		
Minister of Public Administration, State Reform, and Territorial Administration	Maria da Cristo Hilario dos Santos Raposo Costa de Carvalho		
Minister of Public Works, Infrastructure, and Urban Development	Arzemiro dos Prazeres		
Minister of Trade, Industry, and Tourism	Francisco Rita		
Secretary of State for Social Communication	Adelino Lucas		
