= 1975 São Toméan parliamentary election =

- 7–8 July 1975
- All 16 seats in the Constituent Assembly
Party	Leader	Seats
MLSTP	Manuel Pinto da Costa	16
This lists parties that won seats. See the complete results below.

Parliamentary elections were held in São Tomé and Príncipe on 7 and 8 July 1975. The country was a one-party state at the time, with the Movement for the Liberation of São Tomé and Príncipe (MLSTP) as the sole legal party. A total of 52 candidates contested the election, almost all of whom had been nominated by the MLSTP. Around 21,000 people were registered to vote.

The MLSTP candidates received around 90% of the vote and won all 16 seats in the Constituent Assembly. After approving a new constitution on 5 November, the Assembly was dissolved. A National Assembly was convened to act as a legislature for the next four years, which included MLSTP beurean members and representatives of its zone committees, women's organisation and youth organisation, together with members of the incumbent government and five 'suitable' citizens. This included six women, Alda Bandeira, Alda Neves da Graça do Espírito Santo, Julieta da Graça do Espírito Santo, Maria Aurora Lopes, Lurdes de Maria Lima Pires dos Santos and Maria Fernanda Pontífice de Jesus Bonfim.

This legislature had a 90-day mandate to create a new Constitution for the country, this new constitution went into effect 5 November 1975.

== Elected members ==
- Lúcio Afonso de Oliveira
- Maria Augusta da Silva
- Silvestre Balduíno de Barros Umbelina
- Nuno Xavier Daniel Dias
- Tomé Dias da Costa
- Domingos Dias Vaz
- Manuel Francisco da Fonseca Veloso
- Germano Quaresma dos Santos Vaz
- Crispim de Jesus Bonfim
- Francisco Lima de Nazaré
- Filipe Lopes Bandeira
- António Luciano Ramos
- José Messias Rita
- Celestino Pinto
- Guilherme do Sacramento Neto
- Aparício dos Santos
- Marcelo da Veiga
