= XI Constitutional Government of São Tomé and Príncipe =

The XI Constitutional Government of São Tomé and Príncipe (Portuguese: XI Governo Constitucional de São Tomé e Príncipe) was a government of São Tomé and Príncipe, established in April 2006 and disestablished in February 2008.

Office	Holder
Prime Minister	Tomé Vera Cruz
Minister of Defense	Óscar Sousa
Minister of Economy	Cristina Dias, Valdemira Tavares
Minister of Education, Youth and Sport	Maria de Fátima Leite, Maria Rute Leal
Minister of Finance	Maria Tebus Torres, Arlindo Carvalho
Minister of Foreign Affairs, Cooperation and Communities	Carlos Gustavo dos Anjos, Ovidio Pequeno
Minister of Health	Arlindo de Carvalho
Minister of Justice, Public Administration, State Reform and Parliamentary Affairs	Justino Veiga
Minister of Natural Resources and Environment	Manuel de Deus Lima
Minister of Public Works	Delfim Neves
Minister of Territorial Administration, Culture and Social Communication	Armindo Aguiar
Minister of Work, Solidarity, Woman and Family	Maria de Cristo Carvalho
Secretary of State of Agriculture, Fisheries and Rural Development	Argentino Pires dos Santos
