= XV Constitutional Government of São Tomé and Príncipe =

The XV Constitutional Government of São Tomé and Príncipe (Portuguese: XV Governo Constitucional de São Tomé e Príncipe) was a Government of São Tomé and Príncipe. It was established on 12 December 2012 and it was disestablished on 24 November 2014.

XV Constitutional Government of São Tomé and Príncipe
Office	Office-holder	Term	Party
Prime Minister	Gabriel Costa		
Minister of Foreign Affairs and Communities	Natália Pedro da Costa Umbelina Neto		
Minister of Defense and Internal Order	Lieutenant colonel Óscar Sacramento e Sousa		
Minister of Justice, Public Administration and Parliamentary Affairs	Edite Ramos da Costa Tenjua		
Minister of Finance	Hélio Silva Vaz d'Almeida		
Minister of Agriculture, Fisheries and Rural Development	António Álvaro de Graça Dias		
Minister of Public Works and Infrastructures, Natural Resources and the Environment	Fernando Maquengo Freitas		
Minister of Health and Social Affairs	Leonel Pontes		
Minister of Tourism, Commerce and Industries	Demóstene Vasconcelos Pires dos Santos		
Minister of Education and Culture	Jorge Lopes Bom Jesus		
Minister of Youth and Sport	Danilson Alcántara Fernandes Cotú		
Secretário de Estado Adjunto do Primeiro-Ministro para Comunicação Social	Adelino Lucas		
Secretary of State of Infrastructures and Environment	José Maria Amado Fonseca		
