= List of ambassadors of São Tomé and Príncipe to China =

Coordinates: 25.051759°N 121.531595°E

Ambassador of São Tomé and Príncipe to China
- Incumbent; Isabel Domingos since September 10, 2018
- Inaugural holder: Ovídio Manuel Barbosa Pequeno
- Formation: April 14, 2000

The São Toméan ambassador in Beijing is the official representative of the Government in São Tomé and Príncipe to the Government of China.

== List of representatives ==
Diplomatic agrément/Diplomatic accreditation	Ambassador	Observations	List of prime ministers of São Tomé and Príncipe	List of premiers of the Republic of China	Term end
July 12, 1975		The governments in Beijing and São Tomé established diplomatic relations.	Miguel Trovoada	Zhou Enlai	
May 6, 1997		The governments in Taipei and São Tomé established diplomatic relations.	Raul Bragança Neto	Vincent Siew	
December 1999	Ovídio Manuel Barbosa Pequeno		Guilherme Posser da Costa	Vincent Siew	
December 11, 2005	Ladislau D'Almedia		Maria do Carmo Silveira	Hsieh Chang-ting	
September 1, 2009	Jorge Amado (São Toméan diplomat)		Joaquim Rafael Branco	Wu Den-yih	
November 20, 2013	António Quintas Espírito Santo		Gabriel Costa	Jiang Yi-huah	
December 26, 2016		The governments in Beijing and São Tomé re-established diplomatic relations.	Patrice Trovoada	Li Keqiang	
September 10, 2018	Isabel Domingos		Patrice Trovoada	Li Keqiang	current

- China–São Tomé and Príncipe relations
