= Literature of São Tomé and Príncipe =

The Literature of São Tomé and Príncipe is one of the richest in Lusophone Africa. Most works are written in Portuguese, but there are also works in Forro Creole, and notably English as well as Caué Creole. Recently there are very few works written in Príncipense Creole (Lunguye).

== History ==
The earliest writing from the two islands came from the Portuguese in the 16th century. The first recorded literature of the islands was written by Caetano da Costa Alegre, his notable work was the poem collection, Visão. Later, another writer of the archipelago was Sara Pinto Coelho.

In the 20th century, came more writers from the archipelago including Francisco José Tenreiro who became one of the greatest writers in history and is the most influential writer of the nation. He attended Escola Superior de Administração Colonial (High School of Colonial Administration) in Lisbon. He contributed to the Cape Verdean review Claridade and later did poems and song collections and related to African-American folk songs. Later female writers Manuela Margarido and Alda Espírito Santo wrote books and poems. Some of the writers were involved in the nationalist movement and the struggle for independence from Portugal.

More writers wrote works after independence including Olinda Beja and Conceição Lima and into the 21st century and continues today.

Despite increased literary output in some parts of Africa today, mainly coastal regions, the archipelago still has literacy rate comparable to nearby poor countries but slightly higher.

== Writers ==
- Olinda Beja
- Albertino Bragança
- Guadalupe de Ceita
- Sara Pinto Coelho
- Alda Neves da Graça do Espírito Santo
- Carlos Graça
- Conceição Lima

== Poets ==
- Olinda Beja
- Caetano da Costa Alegre
- Francisco da Costa Alegre
- Alda Neves da Graça do Espírito Santo
- Conceição Lima
- Manuela Margarido
- António Lobo de Almada Negreiros
- Rafael Branco
- Francisco José Tenreiro - historically the most renowned of the islands' writers

== Journalists ==
- António Lobo de Almada Negreiros
- Aurélio Martins
