= XIII Constitutional Government of São Tomé and Príncipe =

The XIII Constitutional Government of São Tomé and Príncipe (Portuguese: XIII Governo Constitucional de São Tomé e Príncipe) was a Government of São Tomé and Príncipe. It was established on 22 June 2008.

XIII Constitutional Government of São Tomé and Príncipe
Office	Office-holder	Party
Prime Minister	Joaquim Rafael Branco	MLSTP/PSD
Minister of National Defense	Elsa Pinto	MLSTP/PSD
Minister of Foreign Affairs	Carlos Tiny	MLSTP/PSD
Minister of Education and Culture	Jorge Bom Jesus	MLSTP/PSD
Minister of Commerce, Industry and Tourism	Celestino Andrade	MLSTP/PSD
Minister of Finance	Ângela Viegas	MLSTP/PSD
Minister of Public Works, Infrastructures, Transportation and Communications		PCD
Minister of Health		PCD
Minister of Social Communication, Youth and Sports		PCD
Minister of Agriculture, Rural Development and Fisheries	Ángela Viegas Santiago	PCD
Minister of Work, Solidarity and Family		MDFM/PL
Minister of Internal Administration		MDFM/PL
Minister of Natural Resources, Energy and Environment		MDFM/PL
Minister of Justice, State Reform, Public Administration and Parliamentary Affairs		MDFM/PL
