= Ray-Güde Mertin =

German literary critic and translator

Ray-Güde Mertin (July 19, 1943 – January 13, 2007) was a German literary critic, Romance philologist, and professor who promoted Lusophone and Latin American authors, particularly Brazilians, in the German-language literary market. She translated many writers, including Clarice Lispector, Murilo Rubião, António Lobo Antunes, and José Saramago.

== Biography ==
Born in Marburg, she completed her secondary education at the German School of Barcelona. She studied Romance languages and literatures at the Free University of Berlin, graduating in 1969. She worked as a DAAD German-language teacher in both Campinas and São Paulo before becoming professor at the Pontifical Catholic University of Campinas. From 1969 to 1971, she also taught German literature at the State University of Campinas. In 1978, she earned a doctorate from the University of Cologne with a thesis on Ariano Suassuna.

In 1982, she founded the literary agency Literarische Agentur Dr. Ray-Güde Mertin. She represented several authors, including Lygia Fagundes Telles, Ignácio de Loyola Brandão, Lya Luft, Pedro Rosa Mendes, Marçal Aquino, Caio Fernando Abreu, and Mia Couto. In 1984, she was appointed professor of Brazilian literature at Goethe University Frankfurt. Described as an ''informal ambassador of the Portuguese language in the world'', she was awarded the Order of Cultural Merit in 2005.
