= Island council =

The governing body of certain islands is the island council. The body exists in the following regions:

- the 24 local councils of Kiribati: Subdivisions of Kiribati
- the 4 (−1983), 5 (1983–2010) or 6 (1983–1986) island areas of the former Netherlands Antilles: Island council (Netherlands Antilles)
- the 3 special municipalities of the Netherlands in the Caribbean Netherlands (2010–): Island council (Netherlands)
- the Pitcairn Islands: Island Council (Pitcairn)
- Tristan da Cunha: Tristan da Cunha Island Council

== See also ==
- Ascension Island Council
- King Island Council
- Islands council areas of Scotland
- Council of Rotuma
- Chatham Islands Council
- Nevis Island Assembly
- Tobago House of Assembly
- Autonomous Region of Príncipe
- Rodrigues Regional Assembly
- Regional Government of Príncipe
- Parliament of Åland
- Cabildo insular (Canary Islands)
- Consejo Insular (Balearic Islands)
