= Government of São Tomé and Príncipe =

The Government of São Tomé and Príncipe (Portuguese: Governo de São Tomé e Príncipe) is the executive branch of São Tomé and Príncipe. The current government is the XIX Constitutional Government, established on 9 January 2025.

== Ministries ==
- Ministry of Agriculture, Fisheries and Rural Development
- Ministry of Commerce, Industry and Tourism
- Ministry of Education and Culture
- Ministry of Foreign Affairs, Cooperation and Communities
- Ministry of Health
- Ministry of Internal Administration, Territorial Administration and Civil Protection
- Ministry of Justice
- Ministry of Labour, Solidarity and Family
- Ministry of National Defence
- Ministry of Natural Resources, Energy and Environment
- Ministry of Finance and Planning
- Ministry of Public Works, Infrastructure, Transport and Communications
- Ministry of Social Communication, Youth and Sports

== Constitutional governments ==
- XI (2006–2008)
- XII (2008)
- XIII (2008–2010)
- XIV (2010–2012)
- XV (2012–2014)
- XVI (2014–2018)
- XVII (2018–2022)
- XVIII (2022–2025)
- XIX (2025 – current)
