= XIV Constitutional Government of São Tomé and Príncipe =

The XIV Constitutional Government of São Tomé and Príncipe (Portuguese: XIV Governo Constitucional de São Tomé e Príncipe) was a Government of São Tomé and Príncipe. It was established on 14 August 2010 and it was disestablished on 5 December 2012.

XIV Constitutional Government of São Tomé and Príncipe
Office	Office-holder	Term	Party
Prime Minister	Patrice Trovoada		
Minister of Foreign Affairs	Manuel Salvador dos Ramos		
Minister of Justice and State Reforms	Elísio Teixeira		
Minister of Finance	Américo dos Ramos		
Minister of Public Works and Natural Resources	Carlos Vila Nova		
Secretary of State of Youth and Sport	Abenildo d'Oliveira		
