= Alda Alves de Melo dos Santos =

São Tomé and Príncipe politician

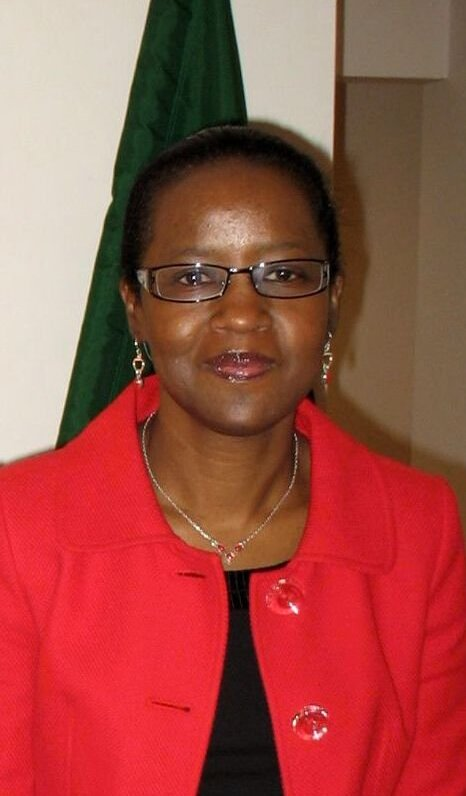
- Alda Alves de Melo dos Santos in 2009

Minister of Justice, Public Administration and Human Rights
- In office 2002–2002
- Preceded by: José Paquete d'Alva Teixeira
- Succeeded by: Justino Veiga

Ambassador of São Tomé and Príncipe to Portugal
- In office 2003–2009

Personal details
- Died: 8 January 2021

Alda Alves de Melo dos Santos (died 8 January 2021) was a São Tomé and Príncipe diplomat and politician who served as Minister of Justice, Public Administration and Human Rights. She served as ambassador to Portugal.
