= 2001 São Toméan presidential election =

- 29 July 2001
- Registered: 67,374
- Turnout: 70.70
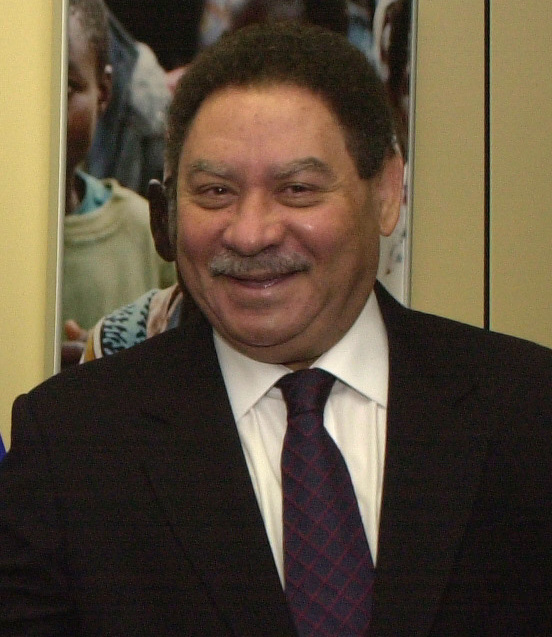

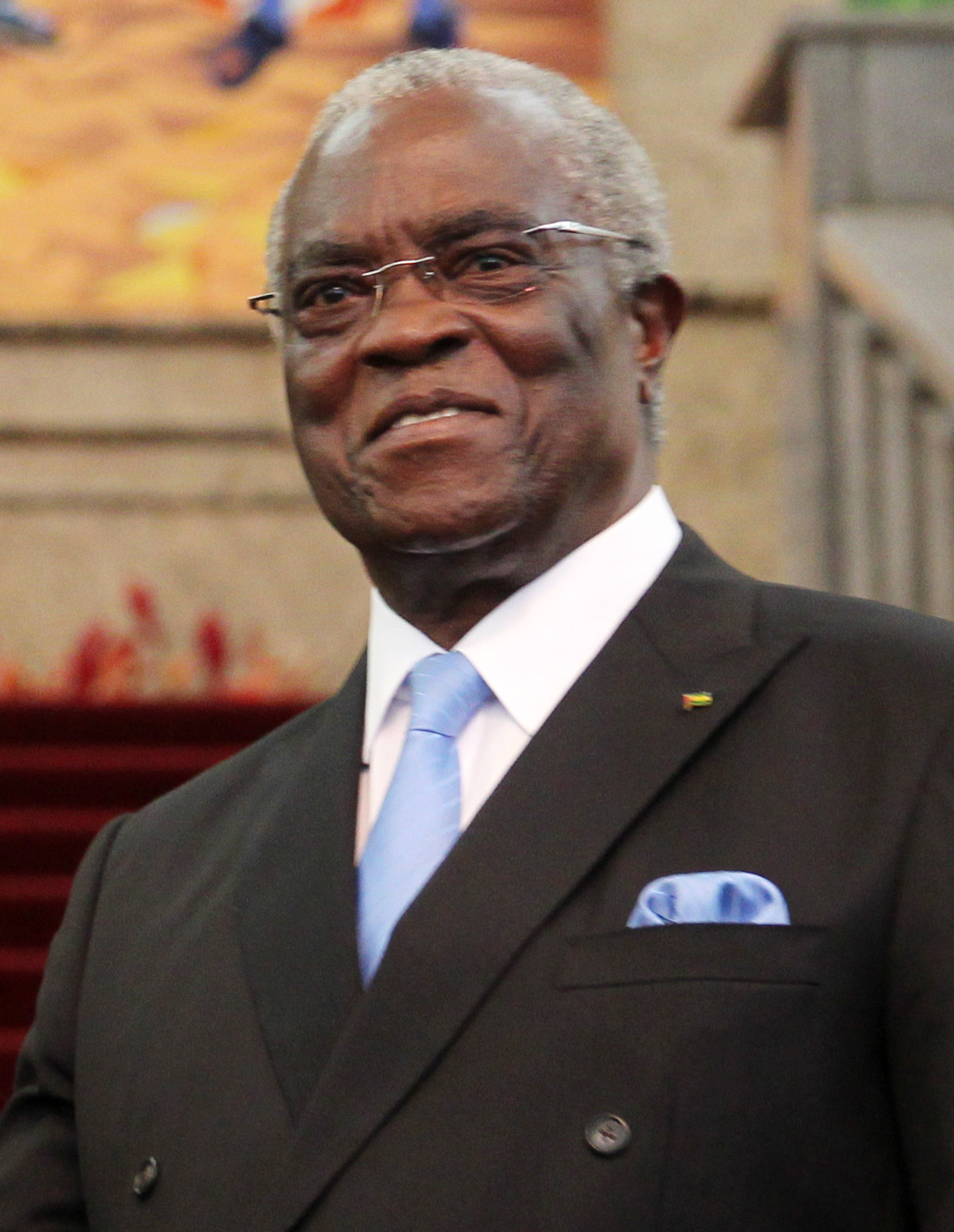
| Candidate | Fradique de Menezes | Manuel Pinto da Costa |
| Party | ADI | MLSTP–PSD |
| Popular vote | 25,896 | 18,762 |
| Percentage | 55.18% | 39.98% |
- Results by district
President before election
Miguel Trovoada
ADI
Elected President
Fradique de Menezes
ADI

Presidential elections were held in São Tomé and Príncipe on 29 July 2001. They were the nation's third presidential elections since the introduction of multi-party politics in 1990. Incumbent Miguel Trovoada was constitutionally barred from participating in the election having served the maximum of two five year terms. The two top contenders for the position were Fradique de Menezes, a wealthy businessman, and Manuel Pinto da Costa, former President and founder of the former single-party, the MLSTP/PSD. The elections, deemed free and fair by international observers, were won in the first round by Menezes. He was sworn in as the third president of São Tomé and Príncipe on 3 September 2001. Voter turnout was 70.7%.

== Results ==
| Candidate | Party | Votes | % |
|---|---|---|---|
| Fradique de Menezes | Independent Democratic Action | 25,896 | 55.18 |
| Manuel Pinto da Costa | MLSTP/PSD | 18,762 | 39.98 |
| Carlos Tiny | Independent | 1,532 | 3.26 |
| Victor Monteiro | Independent | 410 | 0.87 |
| Francisco Fortunato Pires | Independent | 332 | 0.71 |
| Total | | 46,932 | 100.00 |
| Valid votes | | 46,932 | 98.52 |
| Invalid/blank votes | | 703 | 1.48 |
| Total votes | | 47,635 | 100.00 |
| Registered voters/turnout | | 67,374 | 70.70 |
Source: African Election Database
