= Alice Vera Cruz =

São Toméan jurist (born 1955)

President of the Supreme Court of São Tomé and Príncipe
- Incumbent
- Assumed office 2001

Personal details
- Born: 1955 (age 69–70)

Maria Alice Rodrigues Vera Cruz de Carvalho (born 1955) is a São Toméan jurist who served as President of the country's Supreme Court from 2001.

Cruz was educated in Brazil and became a student of Gilmar Mendes, president of the Supreme Federal Court. She practiced law in Brazil and Portugal.

Cruz was elected president of the Supreme Court of São Tomé and Príncipe in May 2011, making her the first woman to hold the position. In January 2003, Cruz and Prime Minister Maria das Neves successfully mediated a solution after President Fradique de Menezes dissolved the National Assembly.

On 21 November 2008, Cruz was a signatory to the Declaration constituting the Conference of Constitutional Jurisdictions of the Portuguese-Speaking Countries. As of 2017, she remains a justice on the Supreme Court.
