= 2016 São Toméan presidential election =

- 17 July 2016 (first round); 7 August 2016 (second round)
- Registered: 111,222
- Turnout: 64.31% (first round); 46.06% (second round)
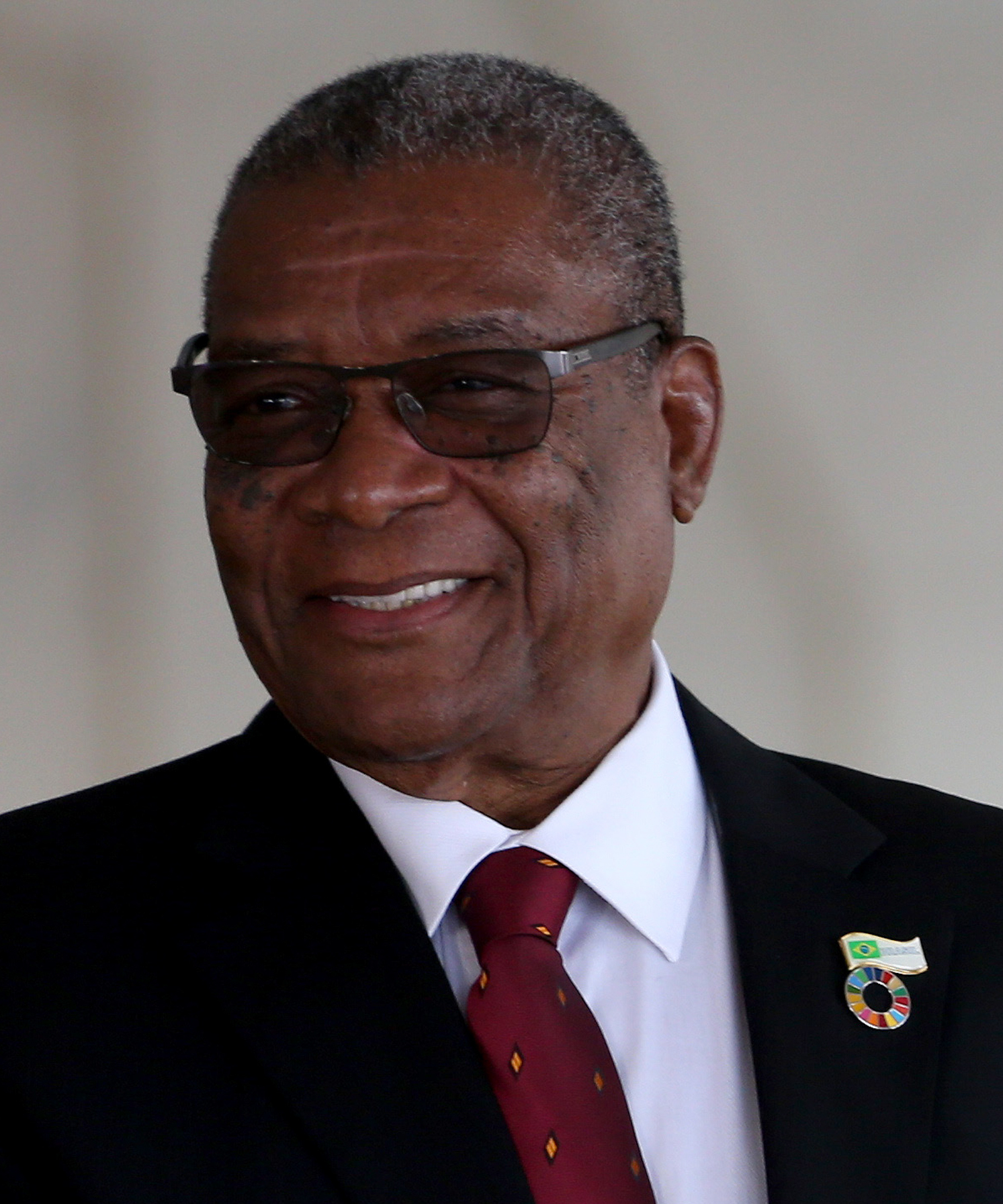

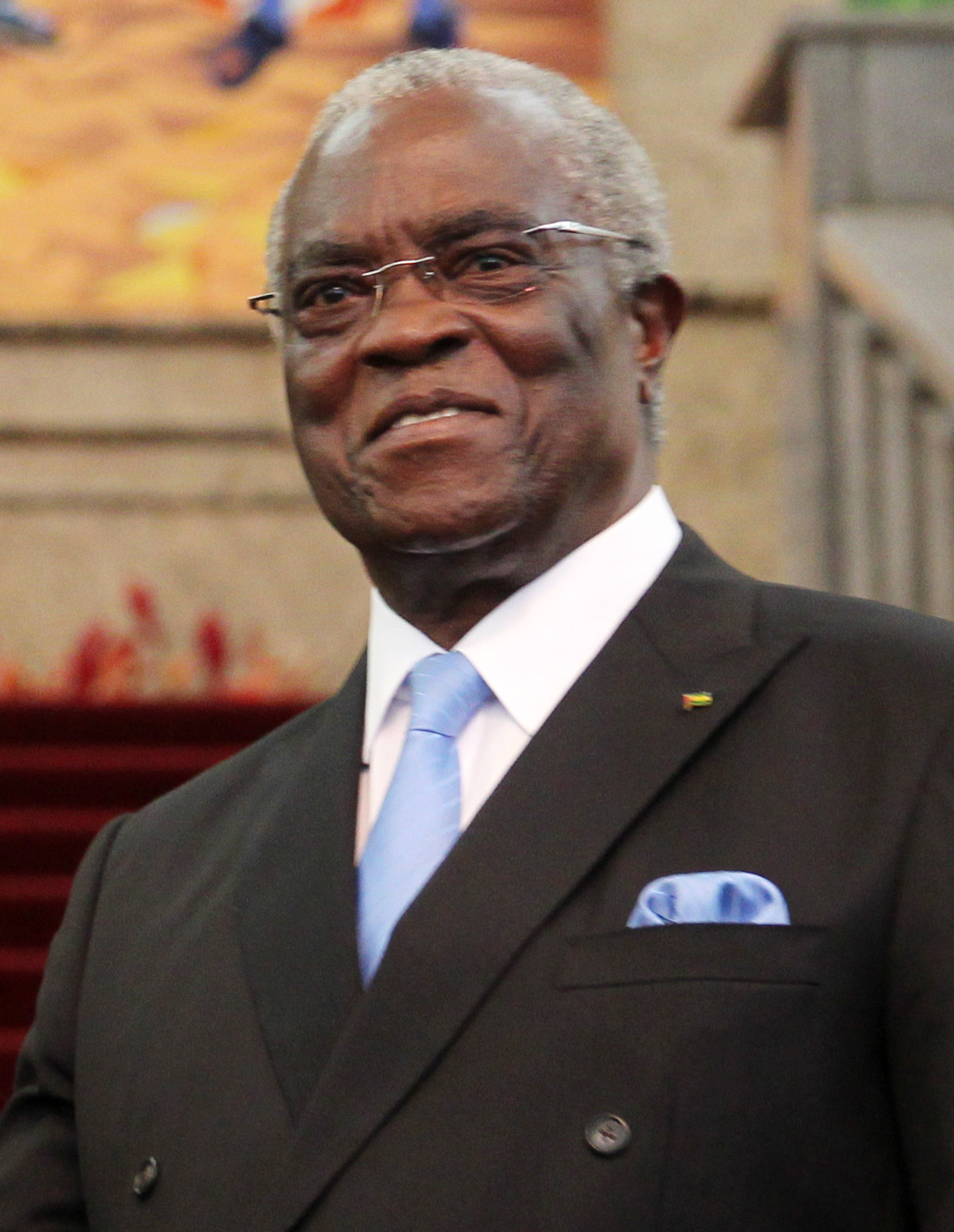
| Nominee | Evaristo Carvalho | Manuel Pinto da Costa |
| Party | ADI | Independent |
| Popular vote | 41,820 | Boycotted |
| Percentage | 100% | – |
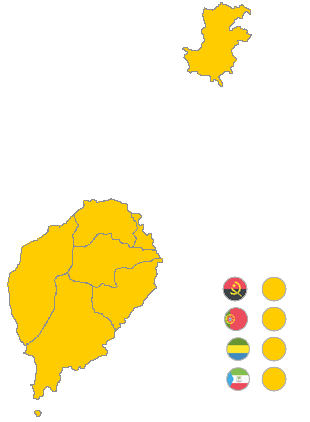
- Results by province
President before election
Manuel Pinto da Costa
Independent
Elected President
Evaristo Carvalho
ADI

Presidential elections were held in São Tomé and Príncipe on 17 July 2016. Initial results suggested Evaristo Carvalho of Independent Democratic Action had been elected in the first round of voting, defeating incumbent President Manuel Pinto da Costa; however, the results was subsequently annulled, necessitating a second round between Carvalho and Pinto da Costa, which was held on 7 August. However, Pinto da Costa boycotted the second round after claiming the first round had been fraudulent, meaning Carvalho was elected unopposed.

== Electoral system ==
The President of São Tomé and Príncipe is elected using the two-round system. If no candidate received more than 50% of the vote, a run-off between the top two candidates.

== Candidates ==
There were five candidates, including incumbent President Manuel Pinto da Costa, two former prime ministers, Evaristo Carvalho from Independent Democratic Action and Maria das Neves from the MLSTP/PSD, as well as two independents.

Carvalho stood as the candidate of the ruling ADI, the party of Prime Minister Patrice Trovoada. Carvalho was initially declared the winner in the first round with slightly more than 50% of the vote, but Carvalho's score was subsequently adjusted downward to 49.88%, necessitating a second round against President Pinto da Costa. However, Pinto da Costa refused to participate in the second round, alleging fraud and calling for a boycott.

== Results ==
| Candidate | Party | First round | | Second round | |
| Candidate | Party | Votes | % | Votes | % |
|---|---|---|---|---|---|
| Evaristo Carvalho | Independent Democratic Action | 34,522 | 49.88 | 41,820 | 100.00 |
| Manuel Pinto da Costa | Independent | 17,188 | 24.83 | | |
| Maria das Neves | MLSTP/PSD | 16,828 | 24.31 | | |
| Manuel do Rosário | Independent | 478 | 0.69 | | |
| Hélder Barros | Independent | 194 | 0.28 | | |
| Total | | 69,210 | 100.00 | 41,820 | 100.00 |
| Valid votes | | 69,210 | 96.76 | 41,820 | 81.64 |
| Invalid/blank votes | | 2,314 | 3.24 | 9,406 | 18.36 |
| Total votes | | 71,524 | 100.00 | 51,226 | 100.00 |
| Registered voters/turnout | | 111,222 | 64.31 | 111,222 | 46.06 |
Source: Téla Nón, Téla Nón
