= Francisco Fortunato Pires =

São Toméan politician (born 1948)

President of the National Assembly São Tomé and Príncipe
- In office 1994–2002
- Preceded by: Leonel Mário d'Alva
- Succeeded by: Dionísio Tomé Dias

Secretary-General of MLSTP-PSD
- In office March 1996 – 2001
- Preceded by: Carlos Graça
- Succeeded by: Homero Salvaterra (2005) (Note: Manuel Pinto da Costa became the party leader as party President in May 1998)

Personal details
- Born: 24 November 1948 Canga near Trindade, São Tomé and Príncipe, São Tomé Island, Portuguese São Tomé and Príncipe
- Party: MLSTP-PSD
- Occupation: Politician

Francisco Fortunato Pires (born 24 November 1948) is a São Toméan politician. He was President of the country's National Assembly from November 16, 1994 to April 18, 2002. He was born in the hamlet of Canga, today a neighborhood of Cruzeiro not far from Trindade. He was also Minister of Justice in the 1980s.

After independence, he attended at the University of Lisbon in 1981 and the University of Havana in 1987. He was Minister of Justice and Public Administration from 1985 to 1991. From 1981 to 1993, he was also Santomean ambassador to Portrugal.

He represented MLSTP-PSD for the district of Cantagalo, a party he campaigned from 1974 to the legislative elections in 1980. After independence he represented Mé-Zochi in the legislative elections in 1985, 1994 and in 1998. Between 1994 and 2002, he was president of the Santomean National Assembly. He succeeded Leonel Mário d'Alva and was succeeded by Dionísio Tomé Dias. Running as an independent candidate in the 29 July 2001 presidential election, Pires finished last out of five candidates, winning 0.71% of the vote. In 2003, he became judge of the Court of Auditors, a position he held until he retired in 2011, later in the year, he was nominated as member of Superior Council of Judicial Magistracy.

== Notes ==
Political offices
Preceded by Leonel Mário d'Alva	President of the National Assembly São Tomé and Príncipe; 1994–2002	Succeeded by Dionísio Tomé Dias
