= Ilza Amado Vaz =

São Toméan politician and jurist

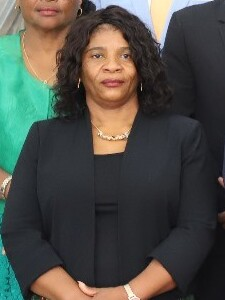
- Vaz in 2025

18th Prime Minister of São Tomé and Príncipe
- In office 9 January 2025 – 12 January 2025
- President: Carlos Vila Nova
- Preceded by: Patrice Trovoada
- Succeeded by: Américo Ramos

Minister of Foreign Affairs, Cooperation and Communities
- Incumbent
- Assumed office 13 January 2025
- Prime Minister: Américo Ramos
- Preceded by: Gareth Guadalupe

Minister of Justice
- In office 2022–2025
- Prime Minister: Patrice Trovoada
- Preceded by: Cilcio dos Santos
- Succeeded by: Vera Cravid
- In office 2014–2018
- Prime Minister: Patrice Trovoada
- Preceded by: Edite Tenjua
- Succeeded by: Ivete da Graça Correia

Personal details
- Party: ADI
- Education: Universidade de Ciências Sociais
- Profession: Politician · jurist · lawyer

Ilza Maria dos Santos Amado Vaz is a São Toméan politician and jurist who served as the prime minister of São Tomé and Príncipe from 9 to 12 January 2025. Previously the minister of justice, she resigned from the post of prime minister after only three days in the position.

== Biography ==
From São Tomé and Príncipe, Amado Vaz attended the Toulouse Capitole University in France, where she graduated with a law degree. She became a lawyer, jurist, and legal consultant, and served as the Director of Customs back in São Tomé from 1999 to 2016. She was also a professor at the Universidade Lusíada in São Tomé.

Amado Vaz was also involved in politics, being a member of the party Independent Democratic Action (ADI). In 2014, she was appointed Minister of Justice in the government of Patrice Trovoada. She held the position until 2018, but in 2022 regained the position, under the title of Minister of Justice, Public Administration and Human Rights, which she was serving in by 2024.

On 6 January 2025, President Carlos Vila Nova dissolved the government of prime minister Trovoada, for a "remarkable inability to resolve the country's many challenges," and ordered the ADI party to present candidates for prime minister within 72 hours. On 9 January, Vila Nova selected Amado Vaz to be the next prime minister, after rejecting a prior candidate. However, just three days later, on 12 January, she announced her resignation from the office. She resigned due to her proposed cabinet being prematurely released to the public, stating that her remaining in the position "would not contribute to the success of public policies and the harmonious and peaceful development of São Tomé and Príncipe."
