= A Dolorosa Raiz do Micondó =

2006 book by Santomean poet Conceição Lima

A Dolorosa Raiz do Micondó ("The Painful Root of the Micondó") is a book of poetry written by the Santomean poet Conceição Lima. It contains twenty-seven poems and was published in 2006 by the Portuguese publisher Editorial Caminho of Lisbon. Lima's poetry is thematic in its genealogical composition. Her words are personal, intimate and, at times, painful as they evoke family ties and the suffering of her ancestors (and other São Toméans) who were brought against their will to the archipelago from mainland Africa and later sent to other countries as slaves. This book is also a testimony to the violence that São Tomé and Príncipe has experienced throughout the centuries with poems such as "1953", "Jovani", and "Ignomínia".

== "Canto Obscuro às Raízes" ==
The first poem in this book is entitled "Canto Obscuro às Raízes" (Hymn to Obscure Roots), in which the poet inquires about the identity of her last African grandfather. Conceição Lima embarks on a lyrical journey in search of her roots and compares her ordeal/search to that of the American writer, Alex Haley, who traced his grandfather Kunta Kinte to the town of Juffure from where, in the 18th century, he was taken as a slave. This story became the inspiration for the novel Roots, which Haley wrote later in life. Although Lima's poetry is about her land and her roots (local poetry), it is also universal as evidenced by this parallel of events in São Tomé and Príncipe and the United States in regards to the painful history of slavery.

The poem ends with the following verses: "Eu, a peregrina que não encontrou o caminho para Juffure / Eu, a nómada que regressará sempre a Juffure" (I, the pilgrim who did not find the road to Juffure / I, the nomad who will always return to Juffure). These verses attest to the revelation that Lima has not found her roots after all; a dilemma that plagues not only the poet and her Santomean compatriots, but all those whose ancestors were enslaved.

== "São João da Vargem" ==
"São João da Vargem" is another poem about familial history but it has a lighter, more innocent tone than the previous poem. It is divided into four parts. The first, with the title "O Anel das Folhas" (The Ring of Leaves), is about her happy childhood growing up on her native island of São Tomé, surrounded by its enchanting nature. These are some of its verses: "E eu brincava, eu corria, eu tinha o anel, / o mundo era meu" (I used to play, run, I had the ring / the world was mine).

The second part of this poem is called "A Sombra do Quintal" (The Shadow of the Backyard), in which Conceição Lima confesses that in those days of innocence she was not aware of the suffering of others around her: "Eu rodopiava e o mundo girava / girava o terreiro, o kimi era alto / e no tronco eu não via não via não via / o tronco rasgado dos serviçais."

"As Vozes" (The Voices), the third part of the poem, evokes remembrances of family members: aunts, cousins, relatives of her mother and even some neighbors.

"A voz do meu pai punha caras concretas / naquelas caras que eram altas, eram difusas / e olhavam p'ra longe, não para mim." These verses are part of the last section of the poem, "Os Olhos dos Retratos" (The Eyes in the Photographs). It is about the family pictures that she finds in the attic of people she does not know, but through her father's storytelling she learns about these family members. Storytelling is a rich African tradition and the foundation of the continent's oral literature, in addition to being strongly present in written literary works such as Lima's.

== "Ignomínia" ==
"Ignomínia" (Ignominy) is a short but powerful poem that has a tragic and profound tone. It speaks of the atrocities committed against the innocent people of Rwanda while the rest of the world remained silent and took no action to protect them. It severely criticizes the governments of the industrialized nations for allowing the genocide to take place in Rwanda. The poem ends with this disturbing verse: "Ruanda ainda conta os crânios dos seus filhos" (Rwanda still counts the skulls of her children).

Through the poems in her A Dolorosa Raiz do Micondó, Conceição Lima ties her autobiographical expression to a commentary on the history of her nation. She lends her lyric voice to those who were unable to express their suffering and those who had no voice in the society.
