= Nuno Xavier =

São Toméan aerospace engineer and politician

President of the Constituent Assembly
- In office 1975–1975
- Preceded by: Position established
- Succeeded by: Guilherme do Sacramento Neto

Personal details
- Born: 13 September 1940; Trindade, São Tomé, Portuguese São Tomé and Príncipe
- Died: June 1976 (aged 35); Vila Nova de Gaia, Portugal
- Political party: MLSTP
- Profession: Aerospace engineer; politician

Nuno Xavier Daniel Dias (13 September 1940 – June 1976) was a São Toméan aerospace engineer and politician who served as the first President of the Constituent Assembly after the country's independence from Portugal. He was one of two signatories of the treaty in July 1975 that established São Tomé and Príncipe as an independent nation.

== Biography ==
Xavier was born on 13 September 1940, in the village of Trindade, on São Tomé Island. He was by profession an aerospace engineer and he worked with the Portuguese Air Force, as São Tomé and Príncipe was at the time a colony of Portugal. He held the distinction of being the first pilot from São Tomé.

Xavier lived for a time in Portugal before returning to São Tomé, where he was an important figure in developing infrastructure. He served in the government as Minister of International Coordination and was the first São Toméan to have the position of head of the country's Civil Aeronautics Service. He led the construction of bridges, roads, and in his position with the Civil Aeronautics Service, he helped expand the runway of the São Tomé International Airport.

Xavier was active in political affairs. At the start of July 1975, parliamentary elections were held for members of the Constituent Assembly and Xavier ran under the MLSTP party, winning a seat. He subsequently was named the legislature's president. A few days later, as president of the Assembly, on 12 July 1975, he signed the treaty with Portuguese officer António Alva Rosa Coutinho that established São Tomé and Príncipe as an independent nation.

Later in 1975, Xavier left his post in the Constituent Assembly to become Minister of Transport and Social Equipment for the Transitional Government. However, in June 1976, (Note: Sources conflict on whether it was 8 June or 11 June.) while on an "official visit" to Portugal, he was killed when the helicopter he was in crashed in Vila Nova de Gaia. He was 35 at the time of his death.

Xavier had several children, including Marta Dias, who became a singer. A 2011 book on São Tomé and Príncipe's history described Xavier as a "charismatic figure of the people of [São Tomé and Príncipe]" and a "National Hero". On the 47th anniversary of independence, in July 2022, the São Tomé International Airport was renamed in his honour.
