= Independência Total =

National anthem of São Tomé and Príncipe

English: Total Independence
- National anthem of São Tomé and Príncipe
- Lyrics: Alda Neves do Espírito Santo
- Music: Quintero Aguiar; Manuel dos Santos Barreto de Sousa e Almeida
- Adopted: 1975

Audio sample
- U.S. Navy Band instrumental version (intro, choruses and half of a verse): file; help

"Independência Total" is the national anthem of São Tomé and Príncipe. The anthem, adopted in 1975, was written by Alda Neves do Espírito Santo (1926–2010) and composed by Quintero Aguiar (1923-2017) and Manuel dos Santos Barreto de Sousa e Almeida (born 1933).

== Lyrics ==
Portuguese original

Coro I:
Independência total,
Glorioso canto do povo,
Independência total,
Hino sagrado de combate.

Coro II:
Dinamismo
Na luta nacional,
Juramento eterno
No país soberano de São Tomé e Príncipe.

I
Guerrilheiro da guerra sem armas na mão,
Chama viva na alma do povo,
Congregando os filhos das ilhas
Em redor da Pátria Imortal.

Independência total, total e completa,
Construindo, no progresso e na paz,
A nação mais ditosa da Terra,
Com os braços heróicos do povo.

Coro I

II
Trabalhando, lutando, lutando e vencendo,
Caminhamos a passos gigantes
Na cruzada dos povos africanos,
Hasteando a bandeira nacional.

Voz do povo, presente, presente em conjunto,
Vibra rijo no coro da esperança
Ser herói na hora do perigo,
Ser herói no ressurgir do país.

Coro I

Coro II

IPA transcription (Note: See Help:IPA/Portuguese and Portuguese phonology.)

[ˈko.ɾu] 1
[ĩ.dɨ.pẽ.ˈdẽ.sjɐ tu.ˈtaɫ]
[ɡɫu.ˈɾjo.zu ˈkɐ̃.tu du ˈpo.vu]
[ĩ.dɨ.pẽ.ˈdẽ.sjɐ tu.ˈtaɫ]
[ˈi.nu sɐ.ˈgɾa.d(u) dɨ kõˈ.ba.tɨ]

[ˈko.ɾu] 2
[di.nɐ.ˈmiʒ.mu]
[nɐ ˈɫu.tɐ nɐ.sju.ˈnaɫ]
[ʒu.ɾɐ.ˈmẽ.tu i.ˈtɛɾ.nu]
[nu pɐ.ˈiʃ su.bɨ.ˈɾɐ.nu dɨ sɐ̃w̃ tu.ˈmɛ i ˈpɾĩ.sɨ.pɨ]

1
[ɡɨ.ʁi.ˈʎɐj.ɾu dɐ ˈɡɛ.ʁɐ sɐ̃j̃ ˈaɾ.mɐʒ‿nɐ mɐ̃w̃]
[ˈʃɐ.mɐ ˈvi.vɐ nɐ ˈaɫ.mɐ du ˈpo.vu]
[kõ.ɡɾɨ.ˈgɐ̃.du uʃ ˈfi.ʎuʒ‿dɐz‿ˈi.ʎɐʃ]
[ɐ̃j̃ ʁɨ.ˈdɔɾ dɐ ˈpa.tɾjɐ‿i.muɾ.ˈtaɫ]

[ĩ.dɨ.pẽ.ˈdẽ.sjɐ tu.ˈtaɫ tu.ˈtaɫ i kõ.ˈpɫɛ.tɐ]
[kõʃ.tɾu.ˈĩ.du nu pɾu.ˈgɾɛ.su‿i nɐ paʃ]
[ɐ nɐ.ˈsɐ̃w̃ majʒ‿di.ˈto.zɐ dɐ ˈtɛ.ʁɐ]
[kõ uʒ‿ˈbɾa.suz‿e.ˈɾɔj.kuʒ‿du ˈpo.vu]

[ˈko.ɾu] 1

2
[tɾɐ.bɐ.ˈʎɐ̃.du ɫu.ˈtɐ̃.du ɫu.ˈtɐ̃.du‿i vẽ.ˈsẽ.du]
[kɐ.mi.ˈɲɐ̃.muz‿ɐ ˈpa.suʒ‿ʒi.ˈgɐ̃.tɨʃ]
[nɐ kɾu.ˈza.dɐ duʃ ˈpo.vuz‿ɐ.fɾi.ˈkɐ.nuʃ]
[ɐʃ.ti.ˈɐ̃.du(‿)ɐ bɐ̃.ˈdɐj.ɾɐ nɐ.sju.ˈnaɫ]

[vɔʒ‿du ˈpo.vu pɾɨ.ˈzẽ.tɨ pɾɨ.ˈzẽ.t‿ɐ̃j̃ kõ.ˈʒũ.tu]
[ˈvi.bɾɐ ˈʁi.ʒu nu ˈko.ɾu dɐ‿iʃ.pɨ.ˈɾɐ̃.sɐ]
[seɾ e.ˈɾɔj nɐ ˈɔ.ɾɐ du pɨ.ˈɾi.gu]
[seɾ e.ˈɾɔj nu ʁɨ.suɾ.ˈʒiɾ du pɐ.ˈiʃ]

[ˈko.ɾu] 1

[ˈko.ɾu] 2

English translation

Chorus I:
Total independence,
Glorious song of the people,
Total independence,
Sacred hymn of combat.

Chorus II:
Dynamism
In the national struggle,
Eternal oath
To the sovereign country of São Tomé and Príncipe.

I
Warriors in the war without weapons,
Live flame in the soul of the people,
Congregating the sons of the islands
Around the Immortal Fatherland.

Total independence, total and complete,
Building, in progress and peace,
The happiest nation on earth,
With the heroic arms of the people.

Chorus I

II
Working, struggling, struggling and conquering,
We go ahead with giant steps
In the crusade of the African peoples,
Raising the national flag.

Voice of the people, present, present and united,
Strong beat in the heart of hope
To be a hero in the hour of peril,
A hero of the nation's resurgence.

Chorus I

Chorus II
