= Ministry of National Defence (São Tomé and Príncipe) =

Government ministry of São Tomé and Príncipe

- Ministério da Defesa Nacional

Ministry overview
- Jurisdiction: São Tomé and Príncipe
- Minister responsible: Lieutenant colonel Jorge Amado

The Ministry of National Defence (Portuguese: Ministério da Defesa Nacional) is a ministry of the Government of São Tomé and Príncipe. It is headed by the Minister of Defence and Internal Order (Portuguese: Ministro da Defesa e Ordem Interna). The current minister is Lieutenant colonel Jorge Amado.

== Ministers of defence ==
- Miguel Trovoada, July 1975 - December 1975
- Manuel Pinto da Costa, December 1975 - August 1977
- Daniel Daio, August 1977 - December 1981
- Celestino Rocha da Costa, December 1981 - January 1982
- Manuel Pinto da Costa, January 1982 - July 1982
- Óscar Sousa, July 1982 - February 1986
- Tomé Dias da Costa, February 1986 - January 1987
- Raúl Bragança Neto, January 1987 - February 1991
- Albertino Bragança, February 1991 - May 1992
- Evaristo Carvalho, May 1992 - October 1994
- Alberto Paulino, October 1994 - August 1995
- Carlos Carneiro Paquete da Silva, August 1995 - November 1996
- João Quaresma Viegas Bexigas, November 1996 - September 2001
- Luís Maria, September 2001 - April 2001
- Victor Tavares Monteiro, April 2001 - October 2002
- Lt. Col. Fernando Danquá, October 2002 - August 2003
- Óscar Sousa, August 2003 - 2008
- Elsa Pinto, 2008 - 2010
- Carlos Olímpio Stock, 2010 - 2012
- Óscar Sousa, 2012 - 2014
- Carlos Olímpio Stock, 2014 - 2016
- Arlindo Ramos, 2016 - 2018
- Óscar Sousa, 2018 - 2021
- Jorge Bom Jesus, 2021 - 2022
- Jorge Amado, 2022 - Incumbent
