= Maria das Neves =

Prime Minister of São Tomé and Príncipe from 2002 to 2004

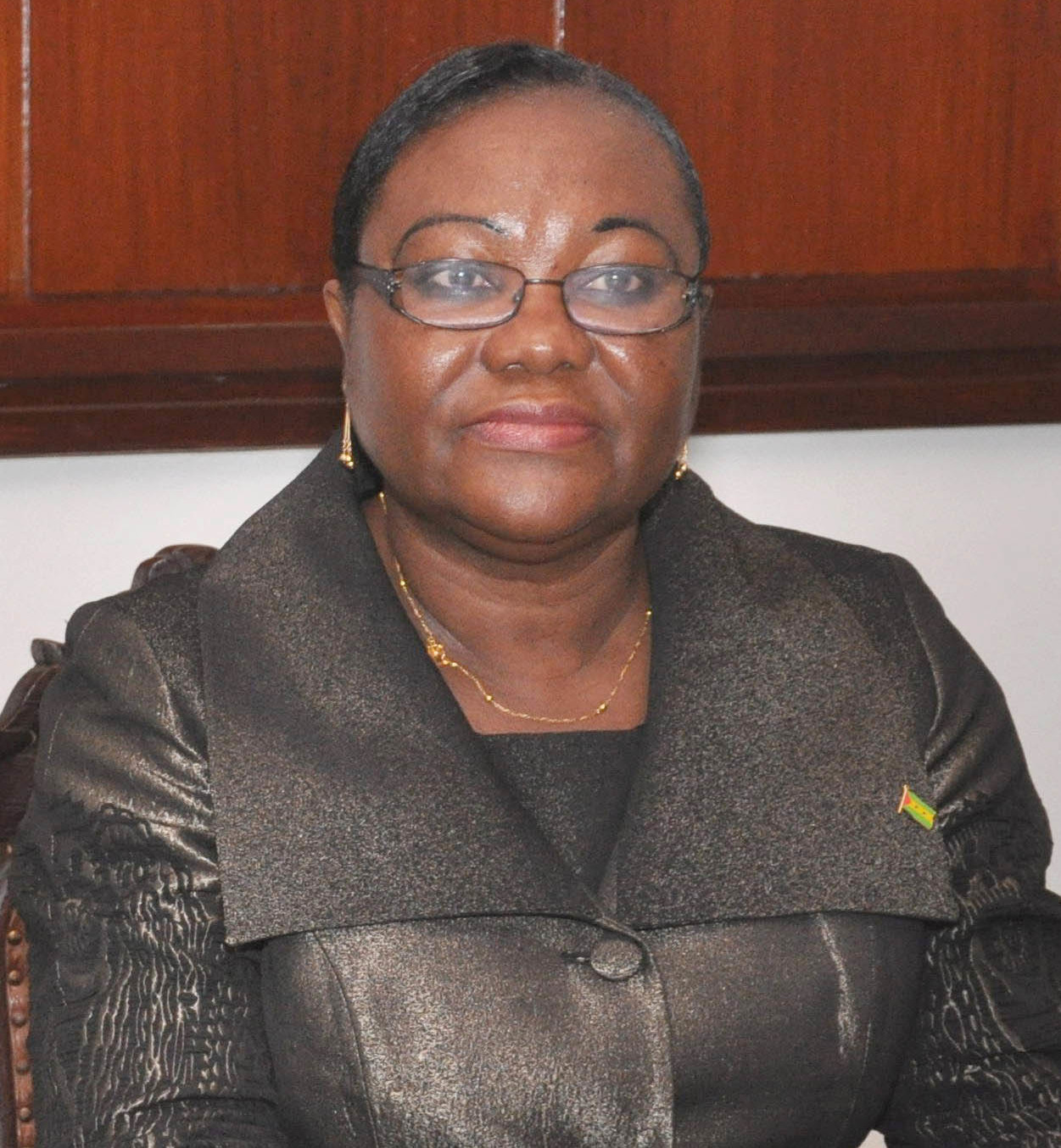
- Das Neves in 2015

11th Prime Minister of São Tomé and Príncipe
- In office 3 October 2002 – September 2004 (Note: Das Neves was briefly deposed during a coup in July 2003. She resigned on 1 August 2003 and was reinstated on 9 August 2003.) (Note: The dates of 14, 15, and 18 September 2004 have been given as the date of her dismissal.)
- President: Fradique de Menezes
- Preceded by: Gabriel Costa
- Succeeded by: Damião Vaz d'Almeida

Personal details
- Born: 11 July 1958 (age 67) São Tomé, São Tomé and Príncipe
- Political party: MLSTP–PSD
- Education: University of Santiago de Cuba

Maria das Neves Ceita Baptista de Sousa (born 11 July 1958) is a São Toméan politician and economist who served as prime minister of São Tomé and Príncipe from 2002 to 2004. Appointed as a member of MLSTP–PSD, she was the first woman to serve as head of government for São Tomé and Príncipe. Das Neves was prime minister during the attempted coup of 2003 and was arrested by those orchestrating the coup. She resigned after it ended but was convinced to stay by President Fradique de Menezes. De Menezes dissolved das Neves's government in September 2004 following allegations of corruption. She continued serving in the National Assembly, and she was an unsuccessful candidate for president in 2011, 2016, and 2021. She was appointed rector of the Lusíada University of São Tomé and Príncipe in 2024.

== Early life and career ==
Maria das Neves Ceita Baptista de Sousa was born on 11 July 1958 in São Tomé. She studied finance and credit at the University of Santiago de Cuba from 1980 to 1987. She worked at the Ministry of Finance in São Tomé and Príncipe, where she led the Statistic Bureau and was involved with the African Development Bank. In July 1993, she was appointed as a member of the Office for the Establishment and Development of the Free-Trade Zone. She also worked at the World Bank and at UNICEF. Das Neves married Carlos Quaresma and they had two daughters.

Das Neves became Minister of Economics under Prime Minister Guilherme Posser da Costa in 1999, taking the position that was once held by her husband. Her husband was the subject of a scandal the same year when he was removed as governor of the Central Bank of São Tomé and Príncipe following allegations that he attempted to defraud a bank in Brussels, and an international warrant was issued for his arrest. In 2001, das Neves's position changed to Minister of Finance.

Das Neves was elected as a deputy of MLSTP-PSD in the National Assembly during the 2002 parliamentary election. She took the position in March, and the following month she was made Minister of Industry, Trade and Tourism under Prime Minister Gabriel Costa. No party had obtained a majority of the legislature, and Costa's coalition was fragile. It was dissolved in September 2002, and the three major parties chose das Neves as a compromise candidate to succeed him as Prime Minister of São Tomé and Príncipe.

== Prime Minister of São Tomé and Príncipe ==
Das Neves became prime minister on 3 October 2002 and was the first woman to serve as Prime Minister of São Tomé and Príncipe. She retained most of Costa's ministers. She also included several women in her cabinet, making up four of the eleven members. She appointed her husband, the former governor of the Central Bank of São Tomé and Príncipe, as an economic advisor in December 2002.

Das Neves considered the country's external debt to be the most important political issue to address during her premiership. She worked to develop industry in São Tomé and Príncipe with an emphasis on oil. She was concerned about making the economy too dependent on oil but did not have enough support from the president or the legislature to enact policy to diversify the economy. Das Neves also focused on developing a tourism industry for the country. President Menezes dissolved parliament on 21 January 2003 after a dispute over constitutional reform, and das Neves worked with Supreme Court President Alice Vera Cruz to convince him not to hold early elections.

An attempted coup took place on 16 July 2003, and she was arrested while asleep in her home. She had ended assistance for the leaders of the Christian Democratic Front in June 2003, and they helped organise the coup. The leaders of the coup threatened to deport her husband, who was still subject to an international arrest warrant. She had a heart attack during the coup and was taken to the hospital. An agreement led to the end of the coup a week later. Das Neves resigned as prime minister after the coup on 1 August 2003, but President Fradique de Menezes convinced her to stay. She was appointed as prime minister again on 9 August. She formed a new government including MLSTP–PSD, MDFM, and Independent Democratic Action.

Das Neves ordered the dismissal of Minister of Natural Resources Tomé Vera Cruz and Foreign Minister Mateus Meira Rita in March 2004, when it became known that each had pursued agreements with Energem Petroleum and the government of Angola, respectively, without her approval. Both were members of MDFM, which defected from her government and joined the opposition. This caused conflict between das Neves and President de Menezes. Das Neves was dismissed by de Menezes in September 2004 after she was implicated in a corruption scandal. She was one of several political figures accused of accepting payments from the food agency Gabinete de Gestão de Ajudas. She alleged that she had been dismissed because of her rejection of the Natural Resource Ministry's agreement with Energem Petroleum. She said that the allegations were a plot against her and that de Menezes was corrupt. Das Neves was succeeded as prime minister by Damião Vaz d'Almeida.

== Post-premiership ==
Das Neves was summoned as a witness alongside other former government officials on 25 October. The National Assembly revoked her parliamentary immunity in 2005, and she was charged with embezzlement of public funds in May of that year. Her husband's fraud sentence in Brussels was commuted to probation in 2006. Das Neves was reelected to the National Assembly in the 2006 parliamentary election. She became chair for the Committee on Human Rights and Gender Issues, where she successfully pushed for criminalisation of battery against a woman. The embezzlement charge against das Neves was paused in April 2007 for lack of evidence, and an appeal by the prosecutor to reopen it was rejected in January 2008. She became the first the first president of the Network of Women Parliamentarians of the Community of Portuguese Language Countries in April 2009.

Das Neves ran in the 2011 presidential election as an independent and placed fourth with 15 percent of the vote. She ran as a member of MLSTP–PSD in the 2016 presidential election and placed third with 24 percent. She ran as an independent again in the 2021 presidential election and placed fifth with 3 percent. Das Neves was appointed rector of the Lusíada University of São Tomé and Príncipe in 2024.

== Notes ==
Political offices
Preceded by Gabriel Costa	Prime Minister of São Tomé and Príncipe; 2002–2004	Succeeded by Damião Vaz d'Almeida
