= África Negra =

São Toméan band

- Years active: 1974–early 1990s 2012–present
- Members: Leonídio Barros; António Menezes; Albertino; Coxinho
- Past members: João Seria; Emídio Vaz; Emilio Pontes; Horacio

África Negra, also known as Conjunto África Negra, are a band from São Tomé and Príncipe, founded in 1974. In the 1980s África Negra were one of the most successful bands in Portuguese-speaking Africa. The band moved to Cape Verde in 1989, and had broken up by the early 1990s. In 2012 África Negra reformed, and have since released several albums and toured in Europe and Colombia.

== History ==
África Negra began in the early 1970s in the city of São Tomé as a group called Conjunto Milando, founded by a butcher called Horacio and his guitarist friend Emilio Pontes. The group formed more officially in 1974, a year before São Tomé and Príncipe gained independence from Portugal; they were initially forbidden by the colonial authorities from using the name África Negra, and so called themselves Girasol.

Significant members of África Negra include lead guitarist Emídio Vaz, rhythm guitarist Leonídio Barros, and vocalist João Seria (formerly of Conjunto Cabana). Seria's vocal style was inspired by Martinho da Vila (his "favourite musician outside Africa") and Franco Luambo. In the 1980s África Negra had 12 members, including 4 on horns. They mostly recorded live, or in the studio of Rádio Nacional de São Tomé e Príncipe, which was not large enough to hold the entire group simultaneously.

África Negra released their debut album Aninha in 1981. They had a prolific output in the early 1980s, including another album Conjunto África Negra in 1981, three albums in 1983, and a six-track cassette San Lena in 1986. Many of these were released on Lisbon record label Iefe.

África Negra toured Angola, Mozambique, Gabon, Cameroon, Nigeria, Portugal, and Cape Verde in the 1980s. Several members of the band moved to Cape Verde in 1989, following a tour there, which sparked some changes of line-up. By the early 1990s África Negra had split up. Barros told Diário de Notícias that "Cape Verde spoilt everything. Of the seven band members who went there, only four returned."

África Negra reformed in 2012, with both Barros and Seria returning, and since then have released three studio albums. They performed together in Lisbon in 2018. In 2022 they played at the Festival de Tambores in San Basilio de Palenque, Colombia, the first free African town in the Americas. João Seria died in 2023, but the group continues to perform, led by Barros, who lives in Lisbon.

In 2022 Swiss record label Bongo Joe Records released a compilation of África Negra hits from the 1980s and 90s, called Antologia Vol. 1. A second volume of rarities and unreleased songs came out in 2024.
