= Inocência Mata =

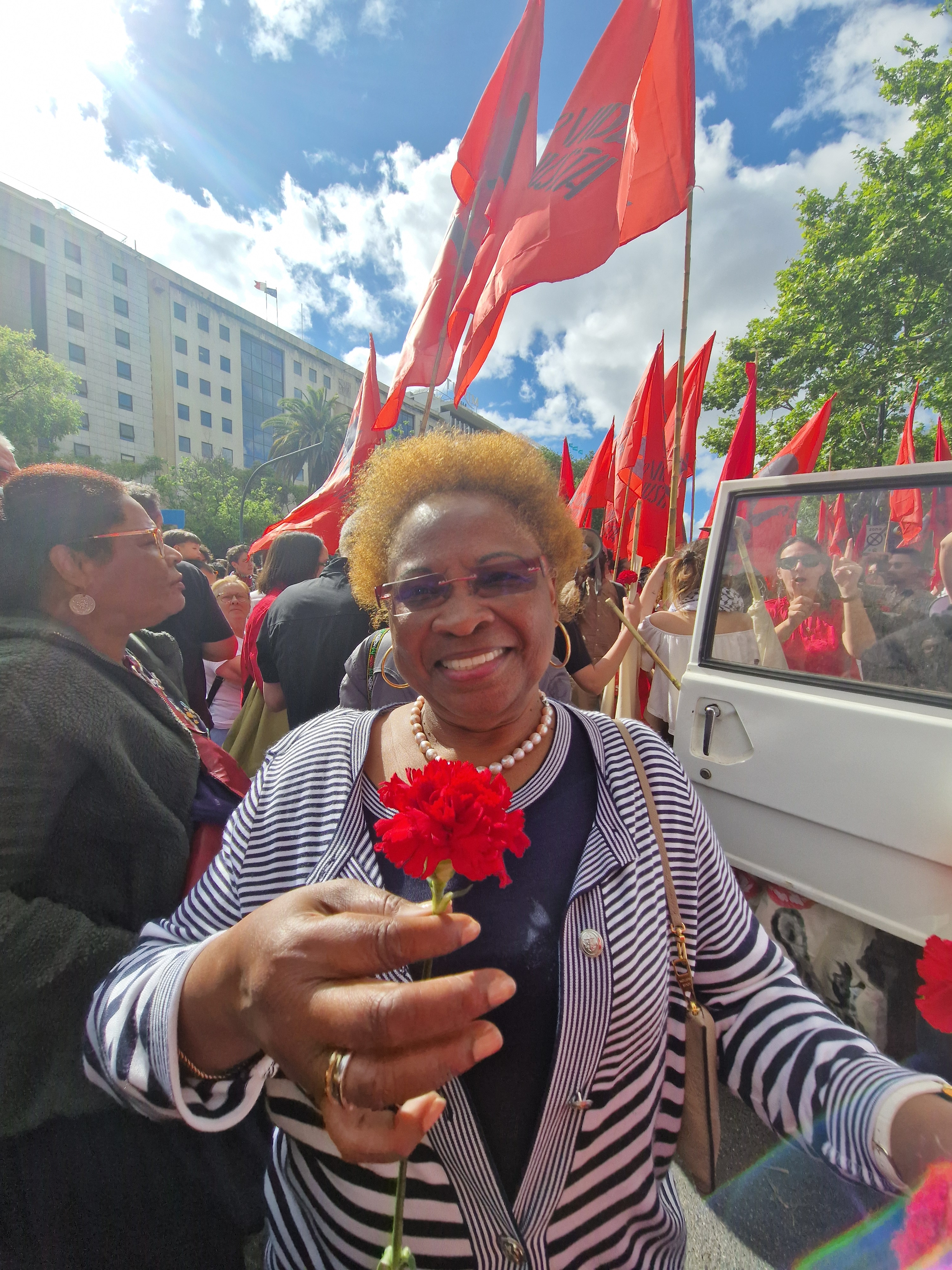
Inocência Mata at the celebration of the 50th anniversary of the Carnation Revolution

Inocência Luciano dos Santos Mata is a Lisbon-based essayist and academic from São Tomé and Príncipe. Her work as a professor and researcher at the University of Lisbon's School of Letters is focused on Portuguese-language literature and post-colonial studies.

She is a founding member of the National Union of Writers and Artists of São Tomé and Príncipe, as well as a corresponding member of the Lisbon Academy of Sciences, Class of Letters.

== Biography ==
Inocência Mata was born in what is now São Tomé and Príncipe, on the island of Príncipe. Her family was from both Angola and São Tomé and Príncipe, with some Romani and Northeast Brazilian roots. She attended grade school in Príncipe and in Angola.

After moving to Portugal in 1980, she obtained a Ph.D. in letters from the University of Lisbon and a post-doctoral degree in post-colonial studies, identity, ethnicity, and globalization from the University of California, Berkeley. Her focus on this discipline has continued in her work as a researcher and professor at the University of Lisbon's School of Letters, in the area of Literatures, Arts, and Cultures. She is also involved in the university's Center for Comparative Studies.

Mata has served as a guest professor at several other universities, including the University of Macau, where she was deputy director of the Portuguese Department until 2017.

Among various other professional associations, Mata is a founding member of the National Union of Writers and Artists of São Tomé and Príncipe.

She is the author of nearly a dozen books on Portuguese-language literature and post-colonial studies, beginning with Literatura Angolana: Silêncios e Falas de uma Voz Inquieta in 2001.

Mata, who remains a citizen of São Tomé and Príncipe, is a corresponding member of the Lisbon Academy of Sciences, Class of Letters. In 2015, she was the recipient of the Portuguese Femina Prize for her work teaching Portuguese-language literature.

In 2020, Mata joined several dozen other African intellectuals in writing an open letter calling on African leaders to pursue structural change in response to the COVID-19 pandemic.

== Selected works ==
- Literatura Angolana: Silêncios e Falas de uma Voz Inquieta (2001)
- A Suave Pátria: Reflexões político-culturais sobre a sociedade são-tomense (2004)
- Laços de Memória & Outros Ensaios sobre Literatura Angolana (2006)
- A Literatura Africana e a Crítica Pós-colonial: Reconversões (2007, republished 2013)
- Polifonias Insulares: Cultura e Literatura de São Tomé e Príncipe (2010)
- Ficção e História na Literatura Angola: O Caso de Pepetela (2010, republished 2011)
- Francisco José Tenreiro: As Múltiplas Faces de um Intelectual (2011)
- A Rainha Nzinga Mbandi: História, Memória e Mito (2012)
- Colonial/Post-Colonial: Writing as Memory in Literature (2012, with Fernanda Gil Costa)
- A Casa dos Estudantes do Império e o lugar da literatura na consciencialização política (2015)
