= Arzemiro dos Prazeres =

Minister of Public Works, Infrastructure, and Urban Development

Minister of Foreign Affairs
- In office 2010–2010
- Prime Minister: Patrice Trovoada
- Preceded by: Francisco da Silva
- Succeeded by: Evaristo Carvalho

Personal details
- Born: October 24, 1958 (age 67) Príncipe

Arzemiro dos Prazeres (Bano) is a São Toméan politician. He was born on October 24, 1958, on the island of Príncipe. He is currently serving as Minister of Public Works, Infrastructure, and Urban Development. He served as a Minister of Industry, Commerce and Tourism twice, from 1992-1994 and from 2002-2003. He holds bachelor's degree in Marine Biology from Federal Rural University of Rio de Janeiro, where he graduated in 1985. He pursued graduate-level studies in Fisheries Technology at SUDPE Rio de Janeiro Brasil, where he graduated in 1987. He became President of the Santomean National Assembly in 2010 and succeeded Francisco da Silva, he had a position for a few months, Evaristo Carvalho took that position later on.

Political offices
Preceded by Francisco da Silva	President of the National Assembly São Tomé and Príncipe; 2010	Succeeded by Evaristo Carvalho
