= Ivete da Graça Correia =

São Toméan politician

Minister of Justice, Internal Administration and Human Rights
- In office December 2018 – February 2022
- Prime Minister: Jorge Bom Jesus
- Preceded by: Ilza Amado Vaz
- Succeeded by: Cilcio dos Santos

Personal details
- Education: University of Évora
- Occupation: Civil servant

Ivete da Graça Santos Lima Correia is a São Toméan civil servant and politician who served as Minister of Justice, Internal Administration and Human Rights from 2018 until her dismissal in 2022.

== Biography ==
Correia obtained a degree in psychology and sociology from a Russian university and a law degree from a São Toméan university. She initially worked at the Ministry of Justice for an extended period. She later served as the director of the country's Department for Combating Drug Use. Ricardo Neto of STP-Press described her as "the public face of the São Tomé anti-drug campaign", and Abel Veiga of Téla Nón noted that she distinguished her career in this role. She addressed the 1st International Conference of Drug Policies in Portuguese-Speaking African Countries, focusing on São Tomé and Principe's need for both adequate drug treatment and efficient measures against drug trafficking, as well as solutions to drug problems.

In December 2018, Correia was appointed Minister of Justice, Internal Administration and Human Rights in the cabinet of newly elected prime minister Jorge Bom Jesus. On 15 August 2019, she signed a co-operation protocol with Portugal for justice, alongside Instituto Camões vice-president Gonçalo Teles Gomes. In December 2019, she served as a delegate to the 16th Conference of Ministers of Justice of the Community of Portuguese Language Countries in Santa Maria, Cape Verde. In February 2021, she represented her country for the United Nations Human Rights Council's 37th Universal Periodic Review.

Correia was demoted from her ministerial position during a cabinet shuffle in February 2022. Cílcio dos Santos replaced her. Prior to her ministerial appointment, she joined the Movement for the Liberation of São Tomé and Príncipe – Social Democratic Party. While minister, she pursued a master's degree program at the University of Évora.
