= Ministry of Justice (São Tomé and Príncipe) =

Government ministry of São Tomé and Príncipe

The Ministry of Justice, Parliamentary Affairs and Women's Rights (Portuguese: Ministério da Justiça, Assuntos Parlamentares e Direitos da Mulher), formerly known as the Ministry of Justice, Internal Administration and Human Rights (Portuguese: Ministério da Justiça, Administração Interna e Direitos Humanos), is a government ministry of São Tomé and Príncipe. It has certain responsibilities such as overseeing the São Tomé and Príncipe land registry, property registry, and prison system.

== List of ministers (Post-1975 upon achieving independence) ==
- Manuel Quaresma Costa (1975–1976)
- José Fret (1976–1977)
- Celestino Rocha da Costa (1978–1983)
- Manuel Vaz Fernandes (1983–1985)
- Francisco Fortunato Pires (1985–1991)
- Celestino Rocha da Costa (1986–1988)
- Olegário Pires Tiny (1991–1994)
- Alberto Paulino (1994-1995)
- Manuel Vaz Fernandes (1995–1996)
- Gabriel Arcanjo da Costa (1996)
- Amaro Pereira De Couto (1996–1998)
- Paulo Jorge Rodrigues Espírito Santo (1999-2000)
- Alberto Paulino (1999-2001)
- José Paquete d'Alva Teixeira (2001-2002)
- Alda Alves de Melo dos Santos (2002)
- Justino Veiga (2003–2004)
- Elsa Teixeira Pinto (2004-2006)
- Justino Veiga (2006–2008)
- José Carlos Barreiros (2008)
- Elsa Teixeira Pinto (2010)
- Elísio d'Alva Teixeira (2010-2012)
- Edite Tenjua (2012–2014)
- Roberto Raposo (2014–2015)
- Ilza Amado Vaz (2016–2018)
- Ivete da Graça Correia (2018–2022)
- Cilcio dos Santos (2022)
- Ilza Amado Vaz (2022–2025)
- Vera Cravid (2025–present)

== See also ==
- Justice ministry
- Politics of São Tomé and Príncipe
