= Ministry of Foreign Affairs, Cooperation and Communities =

Government ministry of São Tomé and Príncipe

- Ministério dos Negócios Estrangeiros, Cooperação e Comunidades

Ministry overview
- Jurisdiction: São Tomé and Príncipe
- Minister responsible: Ilza Amado Vaz
- Website: www.mnecc.gov.st

The Ministry of Foreign Affairs, Cooperation and Communities (Portuguese: Ministério dos Negócios Estrangeiros, Cooperação e Comunidades) is a ministry of the Government of São Tomé and Príncipe. The current minister is Ilza Amado Vaz, appointed in 2025.

== List of ministers ==
This is a list of ministers of foreign affairs, cooperation and communities of São Tomé and Príncipe:

- 1975: Miguel Trovoada
- 1975–1978: Leonel Mário d'Alva
- 1978–1985: Maria do Nascimento da Graça Amorim
- 1985–1986: Manuel Pinto da Costa
- 1986–1987: Fradique de Menezes
- 1987–1988: Guilherme Posser da Costa
- 1988–1990: Carlos Graça
- 1990–1991: Guilherme Posser da Costa
- 1991–1993: Alda Bandeira
- 1993–1994: Albertino Bragança
- 1994: Alberto Ferreira Chong
- 1994–1996: Guilherme Posser da Costa
- 1996–1999: Homero Jeronimo Salvaterra
- 1999: Alberto Paulino
- 1999–2000: Paulo Jorge Espirito Santo
- 2000–2001: Joaquim Rafael Branco
- 2001–2002: Patrice Trovoada
- 2002: Mateus Meira Rita
- 2002: Alda Bandeira
- 2002–2004: Mateus Meira Rita
- 2004: Óscar Sousa
- 2004–2006: Ovídio Manuel Barbosa Pequeno
- 2006: Óscar Sousa
- 2006–2007: Carlos Gustavo dos Anjos
- 2007–2008: Ovídio Manuel Barbosa Pequeno
- 2008–2010: Carlos Tiny
- 2010–2012: Manuel Salvador dos Ramos
- 2012–2014: Natália Pedro da Costa Umbelina Neto
- 2014–2016: Manuel Salvador dos Ramos
- 2016–2018: Urbino Botelho
- 2018–2019: Elsa Teixeira Pinto
- 2020–2022: Edite Tenjua
- 2022–2023: Alberto Neto Pereira
- 2023–2025: Gareth Guadalupe
- 2025–present: Ilza Amado Vaz

== See also ==
- São Tomé and Príncipe
  - List of presidents of São Tomé and Príncipe
  - List of prime ministers of São Tomé and Príncipe
  - List of presidents of the Regional Government of Príncipe
  - List of governors of Portuguese São Tomé and Príncipe
- Lists of office-holders
- List of current heads of state and government
