= Maria do Nascimento da Graça Amorim =

Diplomat and Politician

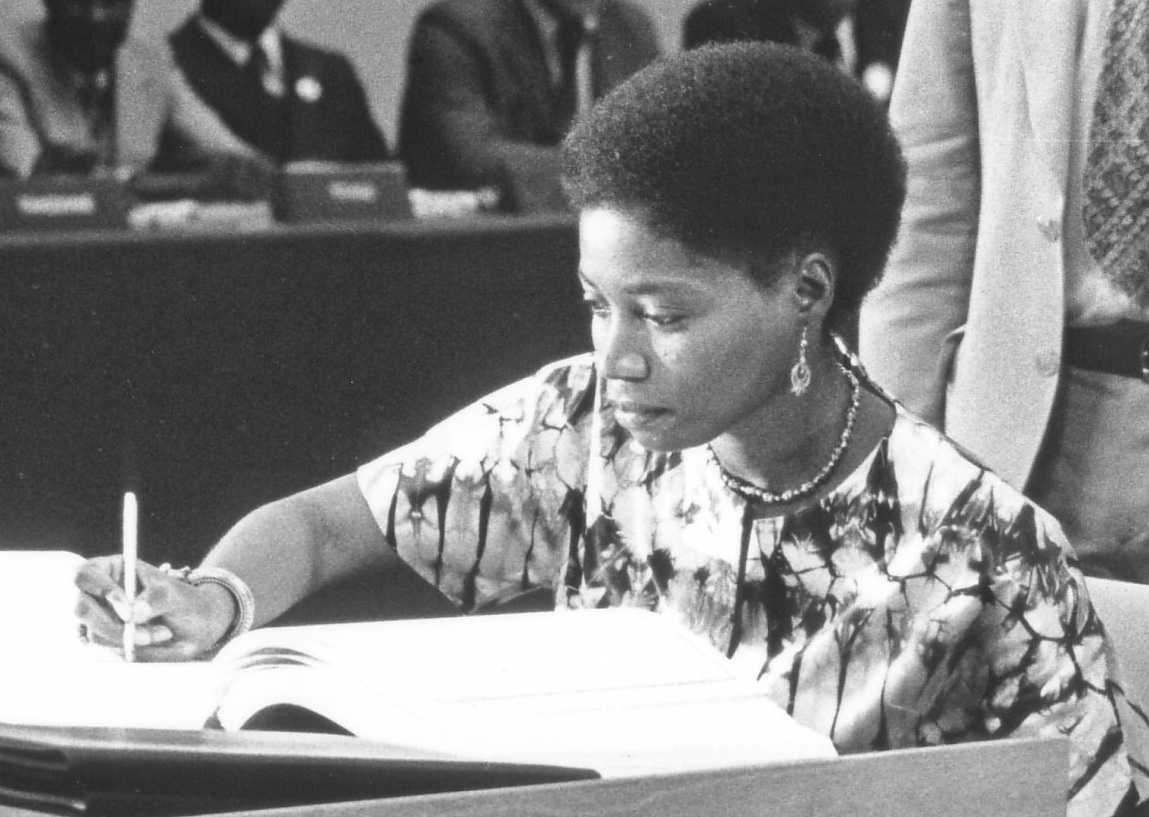
Maria do Nascimento da Graça Amorim in 1979

Maria do Nascimento da Graça Amorim is a diplomat and politician from São Tomé and Príncipe. After the country gained independence in 1975, she was appointed as her country's first ambassador to France and Portugal. Then in 1978 she was appointed as Foreign Minister in the government of President Manuel Pinto da Costa. This office she held until 1986 and was succeeded by Fradique de Menezes.

She was described as a "fervent militant" for socialist ideals, particularly proletarian internationalism, in São Tomé and Príncipe..

Preceded by Leonel Mário d'Alva	Foreign Minister of São Tomé and Príncipe; 1978–1985	Succeeded by Fradique de Menezes
