= Damião Vaz d'Almeida =

Prime Minister of São Tomé and Príncipe from 2004 to 2005

Damião Vaz d'Almeida (born 28 April 1951) served as the 12th prime minister of São Tomé and Príncipe and the vice-president of the Movement for the Liberation of São Tomé and Príncipe-Social Democratic Party (MLSTP-PSD). He became Prime Minister on 18 September 2004 after being chosen by his party, and confirmed by President Fradique de Menezes three days after Menezes had dismissed the government of Maria das Neves. D'Almeida had previously served as minister of labor, employment and solidarity in governments led by Gabriel Arcanjo da Costa and most recently, Maria das Neves.

He is from Príncipe and has held a number of high positions on the island, most notably president of the Pagué district assembly and president of the Príncipe regional government from 29 April 1995 to 12 April 2002.

Damião Vaz d'Almeida's government consisted of ministers from both the MLSTP-PSD and Independent Democratic Action (ADI) parties.

He presented his resignation to President Menezes on 2 June 2005, saying his working relationship with Menezes had deteriorated to the point where they could no longer work together. The two disagreed about how to handle a civil servants' strike and about Menezes's awarding of offshore oil blocks. Six days after his resignation, a new government led by Maria do Carmo Silveira was sworn in.

Preceded by (–)	President of the Regional Government of Príncipe; 1995–2002	Succeeded by Zeferino dos Prazeres
Preceded by Maria das Neves	Prime Minister of São Tomé and Príncipe; 2004–2005	Succeeded by Maria do Carmo Silveira
