= Manuela Margarido =

São Toméan poet (1925–2007)

- Born: Maria Manuela Conceição Carvalho Margarido; September 11, 1925; Roça Olímpia, Príncipe, Portuguese São Tomé and Príncipe
- Died: March 10, 2007 (aged 81); Lisbon, Portugal
- Occupation: poet
- Works: Alto como o silêncio

Maria Manuela Conceição Carvalho Margarido (11 September 1925 – 10 March 2007) was a Santomean poet.

== Biography ==
Margarido was born in Roça Olímpia, Príncipe, in 1925. Margarido's father was a Portuguese Jew from Porto and her mother was of Goa Portuguese and Angolan origin. Her father, David Guedes de Carvalho, was a judge. She attended a Franciscan school at Valença and later studied at Colégio do Sagrado Coração de Maria in Lisbon.

Margarido opposed Portugal's colonization of São Tomé and Príncipe and supported the independence of the archipelago. In 1953, she protested the Batepá massacre perpetrated by Portuguese landowners. Margarido regularly visited Casa dos Estudantes do Império ('House of Students of the Empire'), a facility that became the center of liberation movements in the Portuguese colonies of Africa. There, she met Alfredo Margarido, Edmundo Bettencourt, Cândido da Costa Pinto, and Manuel de Castro.

She studied religious studies, sociology, ethnology, and film at École pratique des hautes études and at Sorbonne in Paris where she was exiled. She was later a librarian and secretary there.

After the Carnation Revolution in Portugal in April 1974 where the Estado Novo fascist regime ended, she returned to São Tomé and Príncipe where she was later ambassador of her country in Brussels and took part in different international organizations. She also worked in the theatre and worked for the Portuguese magazine Estudos Ultramarinos.

In Lisbon, where she later lived, Margarido took part in the dissemination of her country's culture, and was considered by Alda Espírito Santo, Caetano da Costa Alegre, and Francisco José Tenreiro to be one of the greatest names in Santomean poetry. In other works, she was consecutive council member of the Atalaia magazine, of the Interdisciplinary Science, Technology and Society Centre (Centro Interdisciplinar de Ciência, Tecnologia e Sociedade) at the University of Lisbon.

She died at the age of 83 at Hospital São Francisco Xavier in Lisbon. Her funeral took place at the headquarters of the Grande Oriente Lusitano.

== Works ==
In her poetry, she denounced colonial oppression and the miserable working conditions in Santomean coffee and cocoa plantations. Her greatest work was Alto como o silêncio, published in 1957.
