= Edite Tenjua =

São Tomé and Príncipe lawyer and businesswoman

Minister of Foreign Affairs of São Tomé and Príncipe
- In office 22 September 2020 – 2022
- Prime Minister: Jorge Bom Jesus
- Preceded by: Elsa Teixeira Pinto
- Succeeded by: Alberto Neto Pereira

Personal details
- Born: 31 December 1972 (age 53)
- Education: University of Lisbon
- Occupation: Lawyer

Edite Ramos da Costa Tenjua (born 31 December 1972) is a São Tomé and Príncipe lawyer and businesswoman who was Minister of Justice from 2012 to 2014, served on the country's Constitutional Court from 2019 to 2020. She was the minister of foreign affairs from 2020 to 2022.

== Early life and education ==
Tenjua was born in Africa on 31 December 1972 and moved to Portugal in 1976. She has a law degree from the University of Lisbon, graduating in 1999.

== Career ==
Tenjua practiced as a lawyer in Portugal and Mozambique, before becoming director of the Tax and Legal Department of KPMG Angola. In 2004, she joined Joint Authority Nigeria-S. Tomé and Principe as a lawyer, managing its legal unit from 2008 until 2010.

Tenjua is an entrepreneur and since 2006 the owner of TEN JUA Collection Fashion Brand, with stores in Sao Tome, Nigeria, and Portugal. She has also written several children's books includingTita Catita. She heads a foundation called El-Shaddai, which works with disadvantaged children in Africa to emphasise education.

Tenjua was Minister of Justice from 2012 to 2014. In 2019, she was the petroleum affairs advisor to the Prime Minister of São Tomé and Príncipe, before being elected to the Constitutional Court after three judges were dismissed following a disciplinary process after being accused by Prime Minister Patrice Trovoada of taking bribes in a case related to the sale of brewery Cervejeira Rosema to an Angolan company.

Tenjua was appointed foreign minister by Prime Minister Jorge Bom Jesus on 21 September 2020, replacing Elsa Teixeira Pinto.

In 2025 she was one of thirteen women chosen from across Africa as a future "Amujae" leader by the Ellen Johnson Sirleaf Presidential Center for Women and Development.

== Personal life ==
Tenjua is a Christian.
