= Dionísio Tomé Dias =

São Tomé and Príncipe politician

President of the National Assembly São Tomé and Príncipe
- In office 18 April 2002 – 18 May 2006
- President: Fradique de Menezes
- Preceded by: Francisco Fortunato Pires
- Succeeded by: Francisco da Silva

Personal details
- Born: 11 August 1943 Portuguese São Tomé and Príncipe
- Occupation: Politician

Dionísio Tomé Dias (born 11 August 1943) is a São Toméan politician. He was President of the country's National Assembly from April 18 2002 to May 18, 2006. He succeeded by Francisco Fortunato Pires and was later succeeded by Francisco da Silva as foreign minister.

Preceded by Francisco Fortunato Pires	President of the National Assembly São Tomé and Príncipe; 2002–2006	Succeeded by Francisco da Silva
