= Leonel Pontes (politician) =

São Toméan politician

Minister of Labor, Solidarity, Women & Family Affairs of Sao Tomé and Principe
- President: Fradique de Menezes

Minister of Health and Social Affairs of Sao Tomé and Principe
- In office 2012–2014
- President: Manuel Pinto da Costa
- Succeeded by: Maria Tomé

Personal details
- Born: São Tomé and Príncipe
- Other political affiliations: MFCD-PL

Leonel Pontes is a São Toméan politician.

He travelled to Geneva, Switzerland for the International Red Cross Commission of the United Nations. He was named as the country's Minister of Health in 2012 for the XIV Constitutional Government led by Gabriel Costa up to his resignation on 2 January 2014 a few days after the reshufflement of the government.
