= José Carlos Barreiros =

São Toméan politician

José Carlos Barreiros is a São Toméan politician. He was the Minister of Justice briefly in 2008. He has been the president of Sao Tome's electoral commission in 2010 and since 2022.
