= List of presidents of the Regional Government of Príncipe =

The President of the Regional Government of Príncipe is the head of the regional government of Príncipe, an island that forms part of the island nation of São Tomé and Príncipe. The following is a list of individuals who have held this position since 1995.

Tenure	President
29 April 1995 to 12 April 2002	Damião Vaz d'Almeida
12 April 2002 to 20 June 2006	Zeferino dos Prazeres
20 June 2006 to 5 October 2006	João Paulo Cassandra
5 October 2006 to August 2020	José Cassandra
August 2020 to present	Filipe Nascimento

== See also ==
- São Tomé and Príncipe
  - Heads of State of São Tomé and Príncipe
  - Heads of Government of São Tomé and Príncipe
  - Foreign Ministers of São Tomé and Príncipe
  - Colonial Heads of São Tomé and Príncipe
- Lists of Incumbents
