= Conceição Lima =

São Toméan poet (1961–2026)

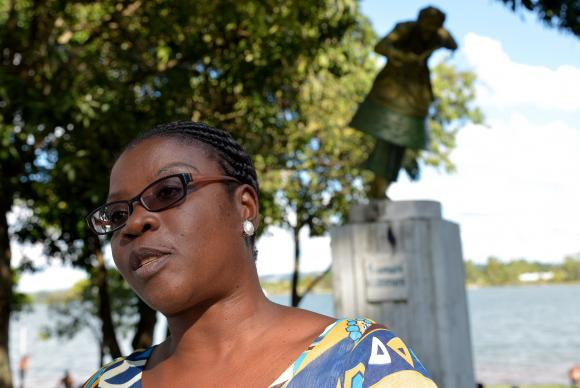
- Lima in 2014
- Born: Maria da Conceição de Deus Lima; December 8, 1961; Santana, Portuguese São Tomé and Príncipe
- Died: May 15, 2026 (aged 64); São Tomé, São Tomé and Príncipe
- Occupation: Poet
- Writing career
- Language: Portuguese

Maria da Conceição de Deus Lima (December 8, 1961 – May 15, 2026) was a São Toméan poet.

== Life and career ==
Lima was born on December 8, 1961 in Santana, São Tomé, one of two islands in the nation of São Tomé and Príncipe situated in the Gulf of Guinea, off the western coast of Africa. She studied journalism in Portugal and worked in radio, television, and print media in her native country. In 1993, Conceição Lima founded the weekly independent publication O País Hoje (The Country Today) which she directed and wrote for during its circulation. She received a degree in Afro-Portuguese and Brazilian Studies from King's College in London. Lima resided in London where she worked as a journalist and producer for the BBC Portuguese Language Service. Her poetry has been published in newspapers, magazines, and anthologies in several countries. O Útero da Casa was her first book of poetry and was published in 2004 in Lisbon by the Portuguese publishing house Caminho. Her second book (also poetry), A Dolorosa Raiz do Micondó, was released in 2006 by the same publisher.

She was a postcolonial writer, one of the few poets who came of age after the independence of her country in 1975. She started writing poems as a teenager and, in 1979, at the age of nineteen, traveled to Angola where she participated in the Sixth Conference of Afro-Asian Writers. She recited some of her poems and was probably one of the youngest participants present. Conceição Lima considered this to be the first phase of her career as a poet. The second phase of her career started with the publication of her poems in newspapers, magazines and anthologies. Additionally some of her work has been translated into English by the Poetry Translation Centre in London.

== Death ==
Lima died at the Hospital Ayres de Menezes in São Tomé, on May 15, 2026, at the age of 64.

== Familiar influences ==
In 2009, Conceição Lima traveled to Póvoa de Varzim (Portugal) and visited the Colégio de Amorim where she shared with students stories of her childhood and memories of family members who influenced her the most. She remembered her father and confessed that he was the one who taught her the power of words. When she was a child, her dad would compose music for her mother when she was mad at him. As a child, Conceição soon realized that words have the power to bring peace because her mom would make amends with him. However, she also realized that words can hurt; after all, it was her father's words that had caused her mom to be upset in the first place. Lima also revealed that her father always knew she would be a poet because of her very vivid and creative imagination.

== Literary works ==
- 2011 O País de Akendenguê [The Country of Akendegué] (2011), Editorial Caminho ISBN 978-9-7221-2133-0
- Quando Florirem Salambás no Tecto do Pico (2015)

=== Poetry ===
- O Útero da Casa (2004)
- A Dolorosa Raiz do Micondó (2006)

== Critical interpretations ==
Conceição Lima's poetry has been praised by the literary critic and writer Inocência Mata who is also from São Tomé and Príncipe. According to Mata, Conceição Lima's poetry is a conscious voice that addresses Europe with an accusation of the suffering that has occurred for centuries in San Tomean society, with its history of slavery and colonialism. Her poetry also voices the disillusion and unhappiness with the unrealized ideals of her country in the post-independence period, which instead has been marked by a climate of repression, anxiety, and fear.
