= Portuguese-language literature =

Portuguese-language literature can be:

- Angolan literature
- Brazilian literature
- Cape Verdean literature
- Latin American literature
- Literature of Equatorial Guinea written in Portuguese
- Literature of Guinea-Bissau written in Portuguese
- Literature of Macao written in Portuguese
- Literature of São Tomé and Príncipe
- Literature of Timor-Leste written in Portuguese
- Mozambican literature written in Portuguese
- Portuguese literature

== See also ==
- Portuguese language
- Geographical distribution of Portuguese speakers
