= Julieta da Graça do Espírito Santo =

São Toméan physician and politician (died 2008)

Member of the National Assembly
- In office 1975–

Personal details
- Died: 2 January 2008 (aged 86) São Tomé

Julieta da Graça Pinto do Espírito Santo (died 2 January 2008) was a São Toméan physician and politician. She was São Tomé and Príncipe's first female doctor and was described as the "mother of nursing" for her extensive role in training health professionals in the country. She was also one of the first female members of the National Assembly.

== Biography ==
Graça was the daughter of Januário Graça, a teacher, and a first cousin of Alda Graça Espírito Santo, the sister-in-law of the first president of São Tomé and Príncipe Manuel Pinto da Costa.

Graça entered the Instituto de Odivelas boarding school in Portugal in 1933. She later studied medicine and surgery at the University of Coimbra, returning to São Tomé in 1955 as the first female doctor on the island. After independence in 1975 she became director general of health services and also co-ordinated World Health Organization programmes in the islands. Her contributions to the domestic healthcare sector, particularly in regard to training new professionals, earned her the title the "mother of nursing" of São Tomé and Príncipe.

In December 1975, Graça was appointed to the National Assembly as one of the first group of six women in the legislature. She later also served in parliament for Independent Democratic Action.

She died in January 2008 at the age of 86.
