= Justino Veiga =

São Tomé and Príncipean politician

Justino Tavares da Veiga is a São Tomé and Príncipean politician.

He was the Minister of Justice, Reform and Public Administration from 2003 to 2004, and from 2006 to 2008. He was again Minister of Justice, Reform and the State, Public Administration, and Parliamentary Affairs in the XIII Constitutional Government of São Tomé and Príncipe, until he resigned on 4 January 2010 along with the Minister for Natural Resources, Energy, and the Environment Cristina Dias, after leaving the majority party Force for Change Democratic Movement – Liberal Party.

In 2017, Prime Minister of São Tomé and Príncipe Patrice Trovoada accused Veiga and two other former members of parliament of taking bribes in a case related to the sale of brewery Cervejeira Rosema to an Angolan company.
