= Armindo Vaz d'Almeida =

Prime Minister of São Tomé and Príncipe from 1995 to 1996

7th Prime Minister of São Tomé and Príncipe
- In office 31 December 1995 – 19 November 1996
- President: Miguel Trovoada
- Preceded by: Carlos Graça
- Succeeded by: Raul Bragança Neto

Personal details
- Born: 1953 São Tomé Island, Overseas Province of São Tomé and Príncipe, Portugal
- Died: 5 June 2016
- Party: MLSTP/PSD

Armindo Vaz d'Almeida (1953 – July 11, 2016) was the seventh prime minister of São Tomé and Príncipe. He held the post from 30 December 1995 to 19 November 1996. He was a member of the Movement for the Liberation of São Tomé and Príncipe-Social Democratic Party (MLSTP-PSD).

Preceded by Carlos Graça	Prime Minister of São Tomé and Príncipe; 1995–1996	Succeeded by Raul Bragança Neto
