= Francisco da Silva (politician) =

Francisco da Silva (17 August 1957 – 14 April 2010) was the president of the National Assembly of São Tomé and Príncipe. He was provisionally replaced by Evaristo Carvalho. He is a member of the Democratic Convergence Party-Reflection Group (PCD-GR).

Preceded by Dionísio Tomé Dias	President of the National Assembly São Tomé and Príncipe; 2006–2010	Succeeded by Evaristo Carvalho (provisional)
