= João Paulo Cassandra =

São Tomé and Príncipe politician

João Paulo Cassandra (born 1961) is a São Toméan politician. He was President of the Regional Government of Príncipe from 20 June 2006 to 5 October 2006. Cassandra is a member of the Movement for the Liberation of São Tomé and Príncipe-Social Democratic Party (MLSTP-PSD)

Preceded by Zeferino dos Prazeres	President of the Regional Government of Príncipe; 2006	Succeeded by José Cassandra
