= Zeferino dos Prazeres =

Zeferino dos Prazeres is a São Toméan politician. He was President of the Regional Government of Príncipe from 12 April 2002 to 20 June 2006. He is a member of the Movement for the Liberation of São Tomé e Príncipe-Democratic Socialist Party and was born in 1960.

Preceded by Damião Vaz d'Almeida	President of the Regional Government of Príncipe; 2002–2006	Succeeded by João Paulo Cassandra
