= José Cassandra =

President of Príncipe from 2006 to 2020

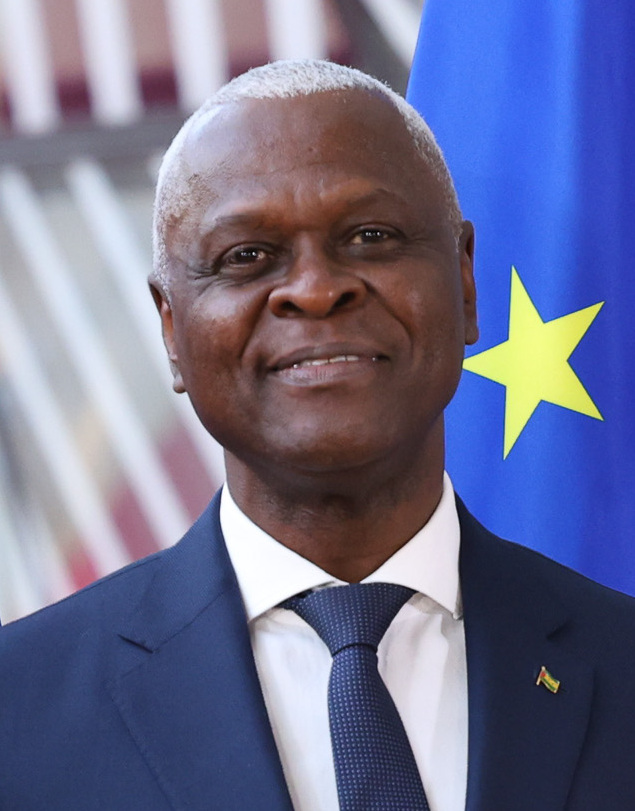
José Cassandra in 2025

José Cardoso Cassandra (born 17 February 1964 in Príncipe) is a São Toméan politician. He was President of the Regional Government of Príncipe from 2006 to 2020.

Cassandra is leader of the Union for Change and Progress in Príncipe (UMPP), a regionalist independent group supported by the ruling Force for Change Democratic Movement-Democratic Convergence Party (MDFM-PCD) coalition.

He was reelected in 2010, 2014 and 2018.

Preceded by João Paulo Cassandra	President of the Regional Government of Príncipe; 2006-2020	Succeeded by Filipe Nascimento
