= Natália Pedro da Costa Umbelina Neto =

São Toméan diplomat (born 1951)

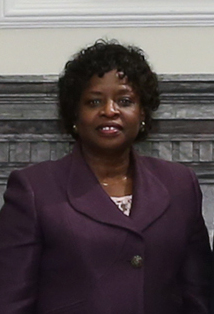

Ministry of Foreign Affairs, Cooperation and Communities
- In office 12 December 2012 – 24 November 2014
- Prime Minister: Gabriel Arcanjo Ferreira da Costa
- Preceded by: Manuel Salvador dos Ramos
- Succeeded by: Manuel Salvador dos Ramos

Personal details
- Born: 3 November 1951 (age 74)
- Education: Aix-Marseille University (PhD); CNRS (MA)

Natália Pedro da Costa Umbelina Neto (born 3 November 1951) is a São Toméan diplomat who served as the country's Minister of Foreign Affairs, Cooperation and Communities from 2012 to 2014.

== Career ==
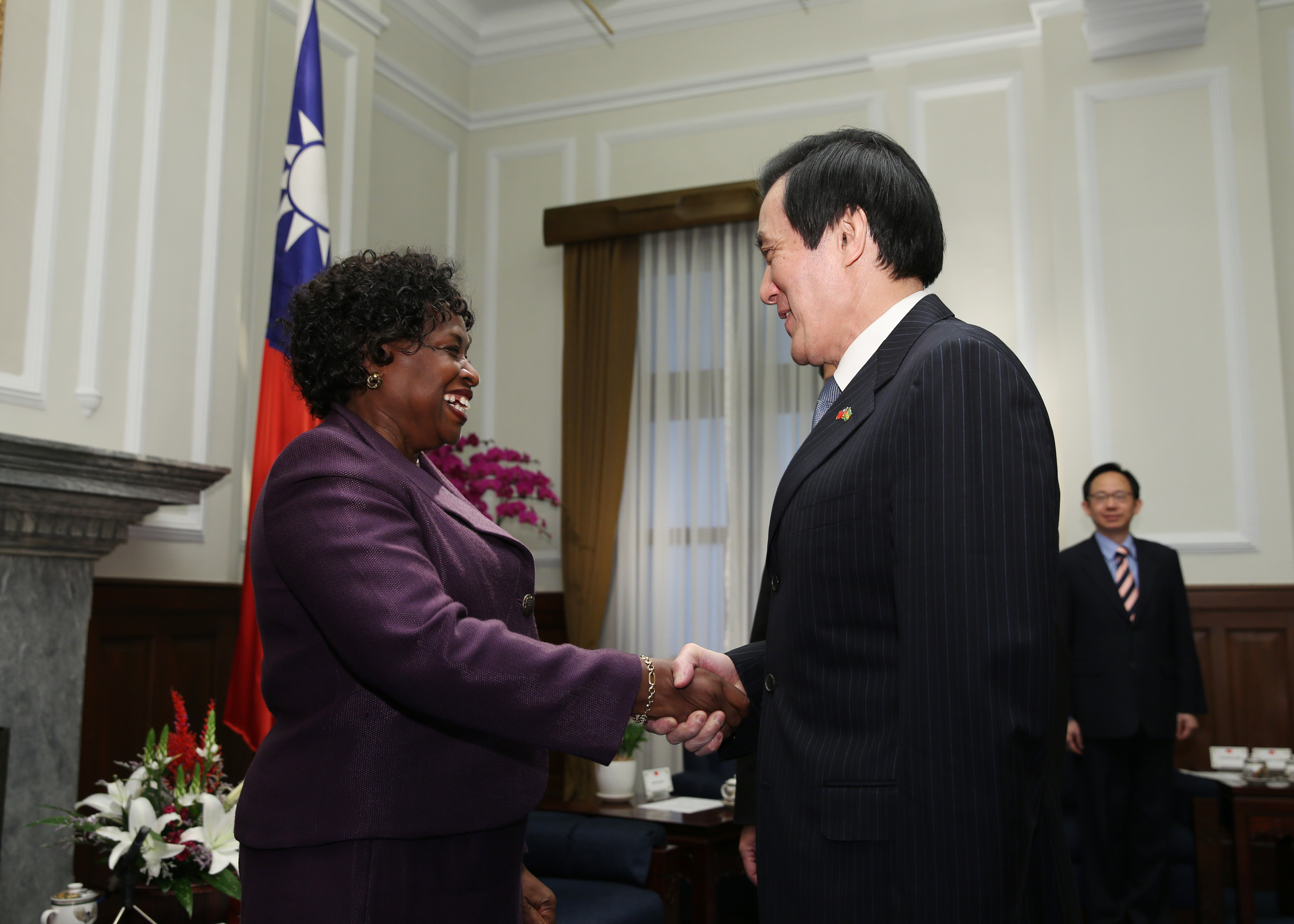
Umbelina Neto meets Taiwanese President Ma Ying-jeou, 15 April 2014

Umbelina Neto served as the Secretary General of the UNESCO National Commission in São Tomé and Príncipe from 1990 to 1999.

In 2007, she obtained a PhD in history from the Aix-Marseille University with a dissertation on the socio-economics of São Tomé and Príncipe from 1853 to 1903.

She was the regional secretary for social and institutional affairs in the regional government of the island of Príncipe from 2010 to 2012.

She served as São Tomé and Príncipe's Minister of Foreign Affairs, Cooperation and Communities from 2012 to 2014.
