= Celestino Rocha da Costa =

Prime Minister of São Tomé and Príncipe from 1988 to 1991

2nd Prime Minister of São Tomé and Príncipe
- In office 8 January 1988 – 7 February 1991
- President: Manuel Pinto da Costa
- Preceded by: Miguel Trovoada (1979)
- Succeeded by: Daniel Daio

Personal details
- Born: 25 September 1938 Overseas Province of São Tomé and Príncipe, Portugal
- Died: 23 December 2010 (aged 72) Lisbon, Portugal
- Party: Movement for the Liberation of São Tomé and Príncipe

Celestino Rocha da Costa (25 September 1938 – 23 December 2010) was a prime minister of São Tomé and Príncipe. He held the post from 8 January 1988 to 7 February 1991. He was the last head of a single party Movement for the Liberation of São Tomé and Príncipe (MLSTP) government.

== Biography ==
He became member of the Movement of the Liberation of São Tomé (MLSTP) after independence in 1976. He first worked as the Minister of Justice from 1978 to 1983, and again from 1986 to 1988. He was temporarily minister of national defence from December 1981 to January 1982. From the beginning of 1986, he was minister of education, labour and social affairs.

In January 1988, a constitutional amendment retained the post of a prime minister; on 8 January, he became prime minister up to 7 February 1991. His government included those that were in exile and later Carlos da Graça as foreign minister. In February and March 1988, his army cracked down coup attempts in Gabon.

After the introduction of democracy in 1990, in fall 1990, his party became the MLSTP-PSD, he ran for the 1991 legislative elections on 20 January and his party won second place with 30.5% of the votes with 21 out of 55 seats and went into opposition. His post as prime minister was succeeded by Daniel Lima dos Santos Daio.

He died in Lisbon, Portugal, in 2010, aged 72.

Preceded by Post Abolished	Prime Minister of São Tomé and Príncipe; 1988–1991	Succeeded by Daniel Lima dos Santos Daio
