= Alda Bandeira =

São Tomé and Príncipe politician

Alda Bandeira Tavares Vaz da Conceição (born September 22, 1949) is a politician in São Tomé and Príncipe.

Bandeira was born in Santana, São Tomé in 1949. Her father was a nurse. She studied modern languages at Eduardo Mondlane University in Maputo, Mozambique, received an MA in modern languages and literature from Lisbon University, and studied international relations at the Lisbon Instituto Superior de Ciências Sociais e Políticas. Bandeira taught in secondary schools in Maputo and São Tomé between 1975 and 1982.

Bandeira began her political career as the director of multilateral cooperation in the Ministry of Foreign Affairs, a position she held from 1987 to 1990. She also served as national coordinator for US African Development Foundation programs in São Tomé from 1988 to 1990. Bandeira was one of the founding members of the Democratic Convergence Party-Reflection Group (PCD-GR), the first public opposition group in the country. After an overwhelming victory for the party in the 1991 elections, Bandeira held the office of foreign minister from 1991 until 1993. After her husband Norberto Costa Alegre was appointed prime minister, she stepped down from her position in the government to occupy her seat as a Member of Parliament and avoid conflicts of interest.

Bandeira was elected president of the PCD-GR in 1995, an office she held until 2001. In 1996 she ran for President of the country, coming in third place with 15% of the vote. Bandeira taught at the Instituto Superior Politécnico in São Tomé from 2000 to 2002. In April 2002 she was appointed foreign minister again, but resigned later that year. Bandeira is currently serving as the Director General of the newly formed Instituto Marítimo e de Administracão Portuaria (Maritime and Port Administration Institute) in São Tomé.

Political offices
Preceded by Guilherme Posser da Costa	Foreign Minister of São Tomé and Príncipe; 1991–1993	Succeeded by Albertino Bragança
Preceded by Mateus Meira Rita	Foreign Minister of São Tomé and Príncipe; 2002	Succeeded by Mateus Meira Rita
