= Francisco Rita =

São Toméan politician

Francisco Rita is a São Toméan politician. He is serving as Minister of Trade, Industry and Tourism.
