= Norberto Costa Alegre =

Prime Minister of São Tomé and Príncipe from 1992 to 1994

Norberto Cota Alegre

4th Prime Minister of São Tomé and Príncipe
- In office 16 May 1992 – 2 July 1994
- President: Miguel Trovoada
- Preceded by: Daniel Daio
- Succeeded by: Evaristo Carvalho

Personal details
- Born: 1951 (age 74–75) Overseas Province of São Tomé and Príncipe, Portugal
- Party: Democratic Convergence Party – Reflection Group
- Spouse: Alda Bandeira

Norberto José d'Alva Costa Alegre (born 1951) is a former Prime Minister of São Tomé and Príncipe. He held the position from 16 May 1992 to 2 July 1994. Alegre is a member of the Democratic Convergence Party-Reflection Group (PCD-GR) and is married to former Foreign Minister Alda Bandeira.

== Political life ==
In 1990, he ran as a candidate for the Democratic Convergence Party-Reflection Group (PCD-GR). In the Daniel Daio government from 1991 to 1992, he served as Minister of Finance and Economic Affairs. He became Prime Minister on 16 May 1992, a position he held until his dismissal by the president on 2 July 1994. He was succeeded by former Defence Minister Evaristo Carvalho. Later, he ran for parliament in the constituency of Água Grande, where the national capital, São Tomé, is located.

| Preceded by Daniel Lima dos Santos Daio | Prime Minister of São Tomé and Príncipe; 1992–1994 | Succeeded by Evaristo Carvalho |
