= Maria Aurora Lopes =

São Toméan politician

Member of the National Assembly
- In office 1975–

Maria Aurora Lopes was a São Toméan politician. She was one of the first group of female members of the National Assembly in 1975.

== Biography ==
In December 1975 Lopes was appointed to the National Assembly as one of the first group of six women in the legislature.
