= Fernanda Pontífice =

Minister of Education and Culture
- In office 2002–2003

Member of the National Assembly
- In office 1975–

Personal details
- Born: 1955

Maria Fernanda Pontífice de Jesus Bonfim (born 1955) is a São Toméan academic and politician. She was one of the first group of female members of the National Assembly in 1975 and later served as Minister of Education and Culture.

== Biography ==
Born in 1955, Pontífice graduated from the University of Lisbon with a degree in literature. In December 1975 she was appointed to the National Assembly as one of the first group of six women in the legislature. After working as an advisor to the Ministry of Education and Culture, in 2002 she was appointed Minister of Education and Culture. She was re-elected to parliament in the 2006 elections, but in the same year was appointed dean of the Universidade Lusíada de São Tomé e Príncipe and resigned from parliament to focus on this role. In 2008 she was elected president of the women's section of the Democratic Convergence Party. She later became rector of the Universidade Lusíada.
