= Martinho do Nascimento =

Politician from São Tomé

Martinho do Nascimento is a São Toméan politician. He was serving as Minister of Health from February to June 2008.

On 13 September 2015, he was elected president of the Order of the Medics of São Tomé and Príncipe (Ordem dos médicos de São Tomé e Príncipe, ORMED-STP) for the Medic Order Council (Assembleia constituinte da Ordem dos médicos). Its opening ceremony was done by president Manuel Pinto da Costa and the closing ceremony by the Prime Minister Patrice Trovoada.
