= Maria Tomé =

Maria Tomé de Araujo

Minister of Labor, Solidarity, Women & Family Affairs of Sao Tomé and Principe
- President: Fradique de Menezes
- Prime Minister: Joaquim Rafael Branco

Minister of Health and Social Affairs of Sao Tomé and Principe
- In office 2014–201?
- President: Manuel Pinto da Costa
- Prime Minister: Gabriel Costa
- Preceded by: Leonel Pontes

Personal details
- Born: São Tomé and Príncipe

Maria Tomé de Araujo is a São Toméan politician. She was serving as Minister of Labor, Solidarity, Women, & Family Affairs under Prime Minister Rafael Branco. She later became Minister of Health and Social Affairs under the decree by president Manuel Pinto da Costa on 21 January 2014.
