= Lurdes de Maria Lima Pires dos Santos =

Member of the National Assembly
- In office 1975–

Personal details
- Born: 1955

Lurdes de Maria Lima Pires dos Santos was a São Toméan politician. She was one of the first group of female members of the National Assembly in 1975.

== Biography ==
In December 1975 she was appointed to the National Assembly as one of the first group of six women in the legislature.
