= Mateus Meira Rita =

São Toméan politician

Mateus Meira Rita (byname Nando) is a São Toméan politician. He served as the country's foreign minister from February 2002 to 8 March 2002 and again from 7 October 2002 to 8 March 2004.

Political offices
Preceded by Patrice Trovoada	Foreign Minister of São Tomé and Príncipe; 2002	Succeeded by Alda Bandeira
Preceded by Alda Bandeira	Foreign Minister of São Tomé and Príncipe; 2002–2004	Succeeded by Óscar Sousa
