= Alda Neves do Espírito Santo =

São Toméan poet and politician (1926–2010)

Alda do Espírito Santo
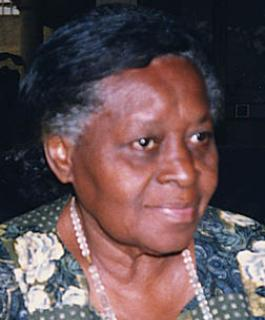
- Born: Alda Neves da Graça do Espírito Santo; 30 April 1926; São Tomé, São Tomé and Príncipe
- Died: 9 March 2010 (aged 83); Luanda, Angola
- Occupations: Poet; politician
- Writing career
- Language: Portuguese

Alda Neves da Graça do Espírito Santo (30 April 1926 – 9 March 2010), known as Alda do Espírito Santo or Alda Graça, was a poet from São Tomé and Príncipe working in the Portuguese language. She also served in the Santomean government after the country's independence.

== Life and career ==
She was born in São Tomé and Príncipe, the former Portuguese territory off the coast of West Africa, to João Graça do Espírito Santo and Maria de Jesus Agostinho das Neves. The family was prominent in São Tomé city. After primary school, she attended secondary school in Portugal. In 1948 Alda da Graça began studying in Lisbon to become a primary school teacher.

While in Lisbon, Alda da Graça met students from other Portuguese colonies and joined a student association called the Casa dos Estudantes do Império. In 1951, she founded Centro de Estudos Africanos with other students interested in communism and socialism, including Mário Pinto de Andrade and Agostinho Neto of Angola, Noémia de Sousa and Marcelino dos Santos of Mozambique, and Amílcar Cabral of Guinea-Bissau.

Alda da Graça returned to São Tomé in January 1953. She worked as a teacher and continued to be active in nationalist circles. In December 1965 she was arrested and imprisoned for several months by the Portuguese authorities as a result of her identification with the African liberation movement.

Since 1975, when São Tomé and Príncipe achieved independence from Portugal, she held several high offices in the government, including as Minister of Education and Culture, Minister of Information and Culture, President of the National Assembly, and General Secretary of the National Union of Writers and Artists of São Tomé and Príncipe.

She was also the author of the lyrics to the national anthem, "Independência total". Her published work includes O Jorgal das Ilhas (1976) and O Nosso o Solo Sagrado de Terra (1978). Her poem "The Same Side of the Canoe" (translated by Kathleen Weaver) is included in such anthologies as The Penguin Book of Women Poets (1987) and Daughters of Africa (1992).

In 2006, she wrote a preface to Retalhes do massacre de Batepá, a book by Manuel Teles Neto Da Costa.

== Death ==
She died aged 83 in hospital in Luanda, Angola, on 10 March 2010. five days of national mourning was declared by the government of São Tomé and Principe.

== Works ==
- O Jornal das Ilhas (1976)
- O Nosso o Solo Sagrado de Terra (1978)
- Mataram o rio da minha cidade (2003)
- Cantos do solo sagrado (2006)
- O coral das ilhas (Coral of the Islands) (2006)
- Mensagens do solo sagrado (2006)
- Mensagens do canto do Ossobó (Messages from the Songs of Ossobó) (2008)
- Tempo universal (Universal Time) (2008)
- O relógio do tempo (The Clock of Time) (2008)

Preceded by Leonel Mário d'Alva	President of the National Assembly São Tomé and Príncipe; 1980–1991	Succeeded by Leonel Mário d'Alva
