= Albertino Bragança =

São Toméan politician and author

- Born: 9 March 1944 (age 82); Sao Tome Island
- Occupation: Politician

Albertino Homem dos Santos Sequeira Neto Bragança (born 9 March 1944 in São Tomé Island) is a Santomean politician who is member of the Force for Change Democratic Movement – Liberal Party (MDFM-PL), he was Minister of National Defence from 1991 to 1992 in the cabinet of Prime Minister Daniel Lima dos Santos Daio and Foreign minister from 1992 to 1994 during the Costa Alegre cabinet.

On 8 April 2002, he became member of the National Assembly and was reelected on 18 May 2006. He represented the constituency (electoral district) of Água Grande and was member of the Standing Committee of the National Assembly.
