= Raúl Bragança Neto =

Prime Minister of São Tomé and Príncipe from 1996 to 1999

8th Prime Minister of São Tomé and Príncipe
- In office 19 November 1996 – 5 January 1999
- President: Miguel Trovoada
- Preceded by: Armindo Vaz d'Almeida
- Succeeded by: Guilherme Posser da Costa

Personal details
- Born: 1946 São Tomé Island, Overseas Province of São Tomé and Príncipe, Portugal
- Died: 16 June 2014 (aged 67–68)
- Party: MLSTP/PSD

Raúl Wagner da Conceição Bragança Neto (1946 – April 17, 2014) was the eighth prime minister of São Tomé and Príncipe. He held the post from 19 November 1996 to 5 January 1999. He was a member of the Movement for the Liberation of São Tomé and Príncipe-Social Democratic Party (MLSTP-PSD) and served as a Major in the São Tomé Army.

Bragança was the Minister of National Defence from 1987 to 1991.

Preceded by Armindo Vaz d'Almeida	Prime Minister of São Tomé and Príncipe; 1996–1999	Succeeded by Guilherme Posser da Costa
