= Carlos Tiny =

São Toméan politician

Carlos Alberto Pires Tiny (15 August 1950 – 8 April 2022) was a São Toméan politician. He finished in third place (3.26%), well behind the winner, Fradique de Menezes (over 55%) in the 2001 presidential election. In the 2006 elections, he was candidate for the MLSTP-PSD party in 2006 and represented the constituency of Água Grande. In 2008, Tiny became the Minister of Foreign Affairs & Cooperation for São Toméan.

He preceded Ovídio Manuel Barbosa Pequeno and was succeeded by Manuel Salvador dos Ramos

Carlos Tiny died on April 8, 2022, aged 71.

== Sources ==
- Gerard DeGroot, São Tomé And The Curse Of Oil. International Relations and Security Network, 12 March 2011, accessed on 9 November 2013

Political offices
| Preceded by Ovídio Manuel Barbosa Pequeno | Foreign Minister of São Tomé and Príncipe; 2008–2010 | Succeeded by Manuel Salvador dos Ramos |
