= Raul Cravid =

São Tomé and Príncipe politician

Raúl António Da Costa Cravid is a São Toméan politician. He previously served as Minister of Planning and Finance in 2008 in the cabinet of Patrice Trovoada. He was general secretary of the MDFM-PL party.
