= Valdimira da Silva Tavares =

Valdimira da Silva Tavares is a São Toméan politician. She was the first female Minister of Agriculture and Rural Development and served from 2007 to 2008. Her successor, Ângela Viegas Santiago, was also a woman.

Political offices
Preceded by Argentino Pires dos Santos; As Secretary of State of Agriculture, Fisheries and Rural Development	Agricultural and Rural Development Minister of São Tomé and Príncipe; 2007–2008	Succeeded by Ángela Viegas Santiago; As Agriculture, Fisheries and Rural Development
