= Daniel Daio =

Prime Minister of São Tomé and Príncipe from 1991 to 1992

3rd Prime Minister of São Tomé and Príncipe
- In office 7 February 1991 – 16 May 1992
- President: Manuel Pinto da Costa; Miguel Trovoada
- Preceded by: Celestino Rocha da Costa
- Succeeded by: Norberto Costa Alegre

Personal details
- Born: 1947 (age 78–79) Overseas Province of São Tomé and Príncipe, Portugal
- Party: Democratic Convergence Party – Reflection Group

Daniel Lima dos Santos Daio (born 1947) is a former Prime Minister of São Tomé and Príncipe. The first person freely elected to the position, he held the post from 7 February 1991 to 16 May 1992. He is a member of the Democratic Convergence Party – Reflection Group.

== Biography ==
When the archipelago became independent in 1975, he was member of the Movement for the Liberation of São Tomé and Príncipe (MLSTP) at the time, a one-party state. He had earlier served as Minister of National Defence, but was dismissed in 1982 by President Manuel Pinto da Costa, who appointed himself to the vacancy. When the nation became a multi-party state in 1990, he was secretary general of the new party, the Democratic Convergence Party-Reflection Group (PCD-GR) and Leonel Mário d'Alva returned from exile and became president.

He won the first multi-party legislative elections in 1991 with 54.4% and got 33 seats in parliament and later became Prime Minister on 7 February. The nation's economy was poor, he led reforms recommended by the IMF (International Monetary Fund) and the World Bank. Prices of goods and necessities were rising, the devaluation of the dobra by 40% led to massive protests and demands for resignation. On 16 May 1992, he left office and his post was succeeded by Norberto Costa Alegre.

In February 1993, he resigned as secretary general of his party PCD-GR.

Preceded by Celestino Rocha da Costa	Prime Minister of São Tomé and Príncipe; 1991–1992	Succeeded by Norberto d'Alva Costa Alegre
