= Adelino Lucas =

São Tomé and Príncipe politician

Adelino Lucas is a São Toméan politician. He served as Secretary of State for Social Communication, first from April 2006 to May 2008 and then from 12 December 2012 to 24 November 2014.

Lucas ran for Prime Minister of his country in September 2014 under president Manuel Pinto da Costa, he lost to Patrice Trovoada in its parliamentary elections.
