= Carlos Gustavo dos Anjos =

São Toméan diplomat

Carlos Gustavo dos Anjos (born 1 September 1956) is a São Toméan diplomat. He was Foreign Minister from April 2006, when the government of Prime Minister Tomé Vera Cruz took office, until he was replaced by Ovídio Manuel Barbosa Pequeno on November 20, 2007.

On October 2, 2009, he was ambassador to the European Union.

Other than Portuguese and Creole, he is fluent in English, Spanish, French, and Italian.

Political offices
Preceded by Óscar Sousa	Foreign Minister of São Tomé and Príncipe; 2006–2007	Succeeded by Ovídio Manuel Barbosa Pequeno
