= Óscar Sousa =

Óscar Sacramento de Sousa (born September 8, 1951) is a Santomean politician. He served as Minister of National Defence of São Tomé and Príncipe from 1982 to 1986, from 2003 to 2008, from 2012 to 2014, and from 2018 to 2021. He also served as acting foreign minister for two weeks in March 2004, and again from January 2006 to April 2006.

Political offices
Preceded by Mateus Meira Rita	Minister of Foreign Affairs; 2004	Succeeded by Ovídio Manuel Barbosa Pequeno
Preceded by Ovídio Manuel Barbosa Pequeno	Minister of Foreign Affairs; 2006	Succeeded by Carlos Gustavo dos Anjos
