= Elsa Teixeira Pinto =

São Toméan politician

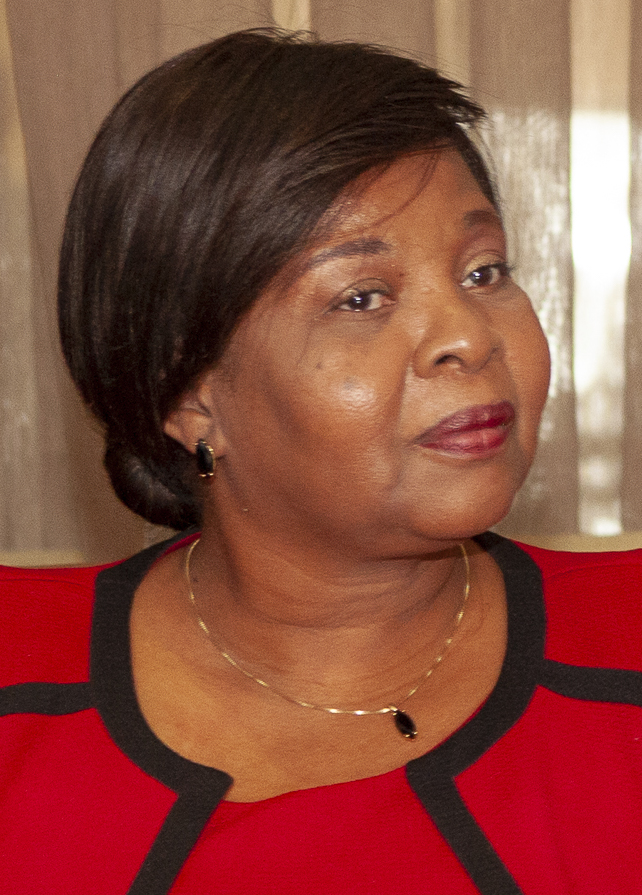
Elsa Texeira Pinto in 2019

Elsa Maria Neto D'Alva Teixeira de Barros Pinto is a São Toméan politician who served as the Defence and Justice Minister, as well as the Foreign Minister, from December 2018 to September 2020.

In 2003 and 2004 (at least), she was a member of the Council of Ministers, as Secretary of State for Administrative Reform and Public Administration, and was a member of the Movement for the Liberation of São Tomé and Príncipe/Social Democratic Party (MLSTP-PSD) political party. She was the Minister of Justice and Public Administration from 2004 to 2006 and in 2010.

According to Pravda, she was Minister of National Defence, as well as Minister for Justice, from 2008 to 2010. According to Whitaker's Almanack, she was still Minister of Defence as of July 2011.

In February 2013, she was the Attorney-General of São Tomé and Príncipe, when she was exonerated by a presidential decree of having issued a cheque for US$15,000 with insufficient funds to honour it to pay for car hire charges during the 2011 presidential elections.

In November 2015, she stood against Aurélio Martins (the incumbent, and competing for the second time, having been the party leader since 2011) for the leadership of the Movement for the Liberation of São Tomé and Príncipe/Social Democratic Party (MLSTP-PSD) political party after the economist Agostinho Meira Rita merged his candidacy with hers.
