= Ovídio Manuel Barbosa Pequeno =

São Tomé and Príncipe diplomat (born 1954)

Ovídio Manuel Barbosa Pequeno (born 5 November 1954) is a São Toméan diplomat, who served as Minister of Foreign Affairs on two occasions.

He became the Ambassador of São Tomé and Príncipe to the Republic of China (Taiwan) in December 1999, serving in that position until he was appointed Minister of Foreign Affairs on 30 March 2004. He remained Foreign Minister until 16 January 2006, when he resigned.

Following his resignation, he was appointed as Permanent Representative to the United Nations and Ambassador to the United States, Canada and Brazil. He presented his credentials as Ambassador to the US on 10 March 2006, as Permanent Representative to the UN on 27 April 2006, and became Ambassador to Canada on 6 June 2006.

In the government appointed on November 20, 2007, Barbosa Pequeno was again named Minister of Foreign Affairs, replacing Carlos Gustavo dos Anjos.

Political offices
Preceded by Óscar Sousa	Foreign Minister of São Tomé and Príncipe; 2004–2006	Succeeded by Óscar Sousa
Preceded by Carlos Gustavo dos Anjos	Foreign Minister of São Tomé and Príncipe; 2007–2008	Succeeded by Carlos Tiny
