= Leonel Mário d'Alva =

São Toméan politician

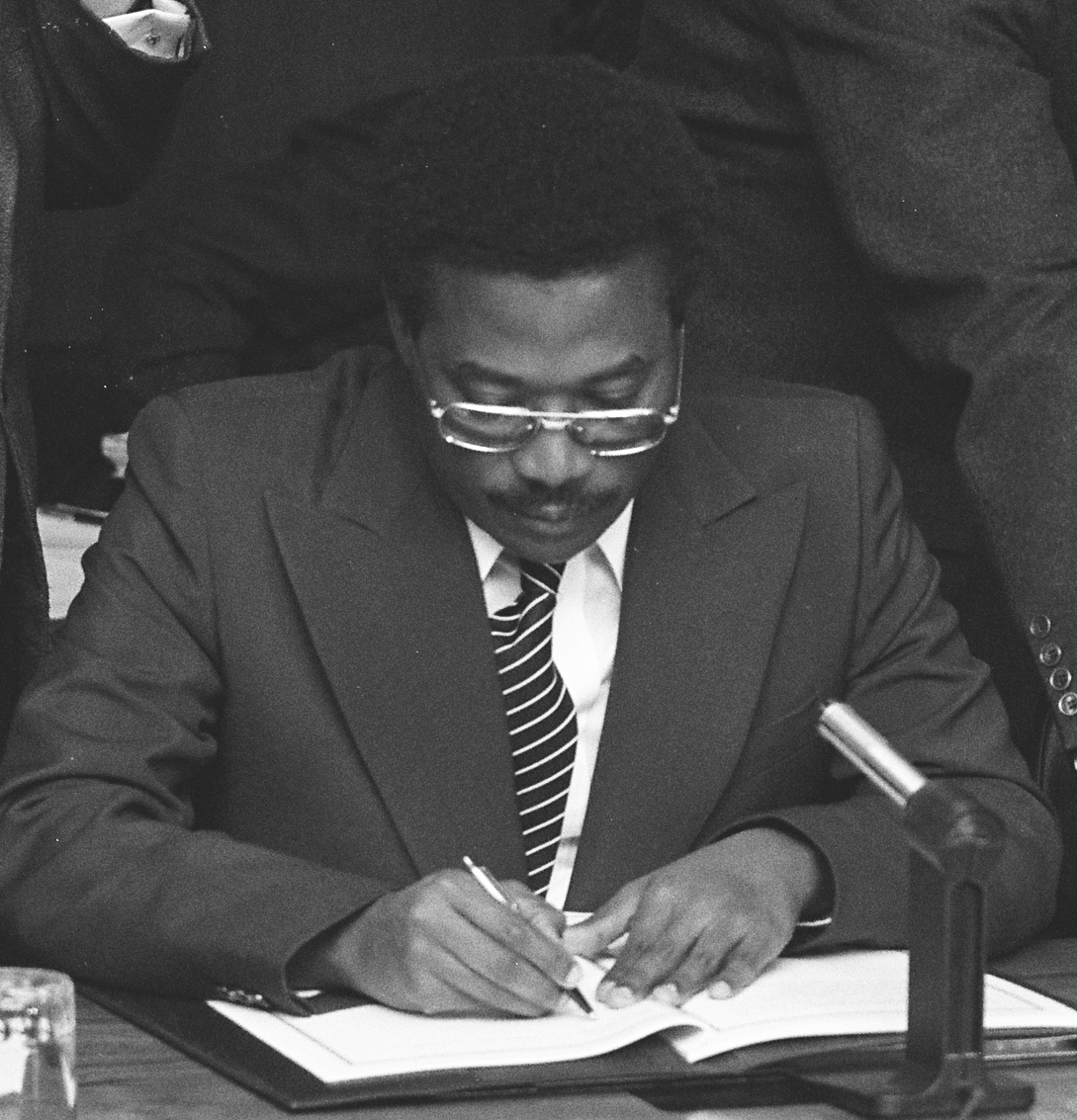
- D'Alva signing the Lomé Convention on behalf of São Tomé and Príncipe, 1977

Acting President of São Tomé and Príncipe
- In office 4 March 1991 – 3 April 1991
- Prime Minister: Daniel Daio
- Preceded by: Manuel Pinto da Costa
- Succeeded by: Miguel Trovoada

Personal details
- Born: 22 July 1935 (age 90) Overseas Province of São Tomé and Príncipe, Portugal
- Party: Democratic Convergence Party

Leonel Mário d'Alva (born 22 July 1935) is a São Toméan politician. He served as the prime minister of São Tomé and Príncipe from 21 December 1974 until 12 July 1975, when the country gained independence from Portugal.

D'Alva was Minister of Economic Co-ordination from July to December 1975. From late 1975 to 1980, he was President of the São Toméan National Assembly. After the country's first democratic elections in 1991, he was again elected National Assembly President. He also served as foreign minister from 1975 to 1978 and was acting president from 4 March to 3 April 1991.

D'Alva co-founded the Democratic Convergence Party – Reflection Group (PCD–RG) in 1991 and subsequently led it for many years.
