= Gabriel Costa (politician) =

Prime Minister of São Tomé and Príncipe from 2012 to 2014

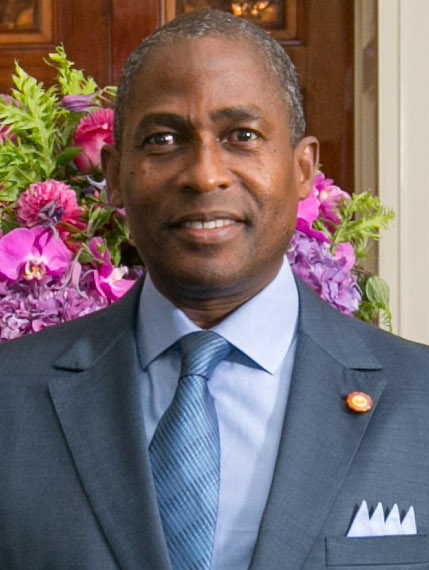

10th Prime Minister of São Tomé and Príncipe
- In office 12 December 2012 – 25 November 2014
- President: Manuel Pinto da Costa
- Preceded by: Patrice Trovoada
- Succeeded by: Patrice Trovoada
- In office 28 March 2002 – 7 October 2002
- President: Fradique de Menezes
- Preceded by: Evaristo Carvalho
- Succeeded by: Maria das Neves

Personal details
- Born: 1954 (age 71–72)
- Party: Union of Democrats for Citizenship and Development

Gabriel Arcanjo Ferreira da Costa (born 1954) is a Santoméan politician who was the tenth prime minister of São Tomé and Príncipe from 12 December 2012 to 25 November 2014. He previously served as prime minister briefly in 2002.

== Prime minister ==
Costa was the Minister of Justice, Labour and Public Administration briefly in 1996. He was Ambassador to Portugal from 2000 to 2002. He was appointed as prime minister to lead a coalition government in April 2002. However, he was sacked from that post on 27 September 2002 by President Fradique de Menezes after army unrest over two controversial promotions.

On 3 December 2012, he was again appointed as prime minister by President Manuel Pinto da Costa, following the dismissal of Patrice Trovoada, who had lost his parliamentary majority.

Political offices
| Preceded by Evaristo Carvalho | Prime Minister of São Tomé and Príncipe; 2002 | Succeeded by Maria das Neves |
| Preceded by Patrice Trovoada | Prime Minister of São Tomé and Príncipe; 2012–2014 | Succeeded by Patrice Trovoada |
