= António Pires Veloso =

- Born: António Elísio Capelo Pires Veloso; 10 August 1926; Folgosinho, Gouveia, Portugal
- Died: 17 August 2014 (aged 88); Porto, Portugal
- Other name: Vice-Rei do Norte (Viceroy of the North)
- Education: University of Porto, Military Academy
- Relatives: Aureliano Veloso (brother), Rui Veloso (nephew)
- Military career
- Allegiance: Portugal
- Branch: Portuguese Army
- Service years: 1949–1977
- Rank: General
- Commands: Northern Military Region (September 1975 – November 1977)
- Awards: Porto Municipal Medal of Merit, gold class
- Memorials: Bust in Praça da República, Porto
- Other work: Governor, later High Commissioner of Portuguese São Tomé and Príncipe (April 1974 – July 1975); Presidential candidate (1980)

António Elísio Capelo Pires Veloso (10 August 1926 – 17 August 2014) was a general in the Portuguese Army. He was known as the Vice-Rei do Norte (Viceroy of the North) for his role in quashing the Coup of 25 November 1975. He was also the final Governor and High Commissioner of Portuguese São Tomé and Príncipe from 1974 to 1975, and a candidate in the 1980 Portuguese presidential election.

== Biography ==
=== Early life and colonial service ===
Pires Veloso was born in Folgosinho, Gouveia, Guarda District. His family moved to Vila Nova de Gaia in the Porto metropolitan area in 1936. He graduated in Military Preparation at the University of Porto in 1944, and at 20 he enrolled at the Military Academy.

He was stationed in Macau (1949–1951) and fought in Portugal's colonial wars in Angola (1961–1964) and Mozambique (1965–1974). Following the Carnation Revolution in April 1974, he served as Portugal's colonial governor in São Tomé and Príncipe and later its High Commissioner, until the archipelago gained independence on 12 July 1975.

=== Vice-rei do Norte and presidential campaign ===
From September 1975 to November 1977, Pires Veloso was the military leader of Northern Portugal, and played a key role in quashing the Coup of 25 November 1975. The attempted coup was led by left-wing factions, principally in the south, while the north was mainly conservative. He mobilised his troops against the coup and offered to host a provisional government in Porto should Lisbon have fallen; he also locked down the port of Leixões so no northern ship entered the south. Álvaro Cunhal, the leader of the Portuguese Communist Party, ordered the revolutionaries to cease, due to the strength of opposition in the north. These exploits earned Pires Veloso the nickname "vice-rei do norte" (Viceroy of the North). He was an independent candidate in the 1980 Portuguese presidential election, won by fellow general António Ramalho Eanes.

=== Later years ===
On 25 April 2006, a public holiday marking the Carnation Revolution, Pires Veloso was awarded by Porto mayor Rui Rio the Municipal Medal of Merit, gold class, for his military service. He spent his later life farming in his place of birth and published his memoirs in 2006. In a 2012 interview with Lusa on the anniversary of the Carnation Revolution, he said that "I look at the current situation with a lot of apprehension and a lot of sadness. Because I feel that we have an institutionalised lie in our country. There is no truth. Speak the truth and the country will be different. This is gravely serious; (...) it gives the impression that we would need another '25 April' in all senses, to correct and reinstate truth in the system and in society."

Months after his death, it was proposed that Porto's Praça da República square be renamed in Pires Veloso's honour. A bust was erected in the square in September 2015, was vandalised days later, and a sword-shaped detail was stolen the following January.

== Personal life ==
Pires Veloso's older brother, Aureliano (1924–2019), was the first democratically elected mayor of Porto in 1977. Aureliano's son, Rui (born 1957), is a singer-songwriter.
