= Tupinambás Uprising =

Indigenous revolt against the Portuguese domination in Brazil

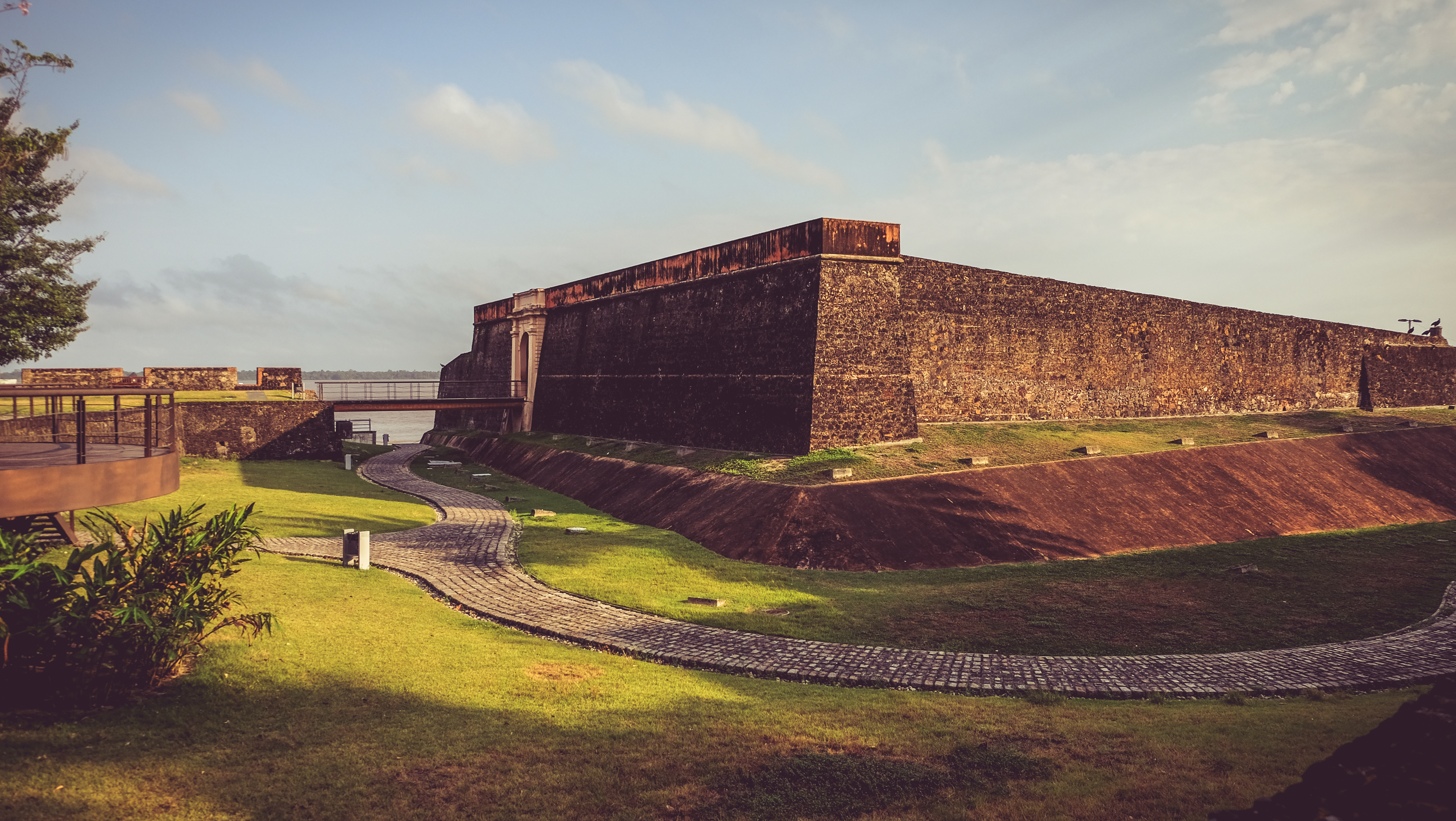
Presépio Fort located in the city of Belém of Pará.

The Tupinambá Uprising (1617-1621), also called the Tupinambá Revolt, took place on January 13, 1618, and was led by the tuxaua (cacique) Cabelo de Velha, who gathered several native indigenous groups from the busy Mairi region (now the city of Belém of Pará) to fight against the Portuguese, due to the abuses committed by these colonizers when they exploited the indigenous labor force in the Conquest of Pará. This movement was one of a series of uprisings that took place in the region between 1617 and 1619. The disputes culminated in the attack in January 1619 by the Tupinambá on the Presépio Fort (a Portuguese fortification), located on the shores of Guajará Bay.

At the beginning of the 17th century, the Portuguese were on expeditions through Brazilian territory. Where the region in the extreme north of the country was invaded by the English and the Dutch, who set up trading posts to exploit the raw material that would be sold in Europe. Thus, the Portuguese started military campaigns to strengthen their dominance in the Amazon territory and ensure the exploitation of local natural resources (sertão drugs), due to the loss of competition in the Asian market for the Dutch. Where in 1580 occurred the Portuguese invasion and the establishment of a colonial nucleus with Captain Castelo Branco and, in 1616, the settlers founded the city of Belém and settled in the Amazon, aiming to protect the entrance of the Amazon River. They made an alliance with the local native Tupinambás (people formed from the migration of Tupis who inhabited the northeastern coast).

The alliance with the Tupinambás of Pará, was mediated by the Maranhão ethnic group that already had a relationship with foreigners, seeking benefits in trade and in wars. However, the colonists then proceeded to enslave the Tupinambás, just as they had done with the indigenous people in the northeast of the country, the first to be conquered.

The abuses of slavery resulted in the union against the Portuguese. The captured indigenous suffered physical, cultural and religious impositions by the Portuguese, via Franciscan and Jesuit missionaries, in addition to serving as labor in colonial production. The uprisings resulted in massacres and imprisonment of the natives, who served as troops for the Portuguese disputes.

== History ==
=== Context ===
The European maritime expansion, started in the 15th century, arose from the need of countries to expand their trade in crisis, mainly due to the commercial monopoly of the Turks in the Eastern region and the dominance of the Arabs in Africa. With the rising price of Asian and African goods, such as precious stones, perfumes, fabrics, and spices, the Europeans started great voyages by ships to discover new lands to be explored. The Portuguese and Spanish voyages resulted in the conquest of several territories, among them, the American continent. In order to divide the lands to be dominated by each of them, Portugal and Spain signed the Treaty of Tordesillas in 1494. The agreement separated the world by an imaginary meridian: the eastern side was Portuguese and the western side Spanish. The Tordesillas meridian cut the Brazilian territory in two parts and Portugal was only entitled to the area that today comprises the northeast region and a small part of the southeast of the country. However, the colonizing initiative of the Portuguese in Brazil, to exploit the natural wealth and settlement, was extended beyond the limits defined by the treaty during the 17th and 18th centuries.

In the 17th century, territorial disputes and competition among European powers were the motivations for the exploration of the Amazon, a vast territory with a variety of riches, still unknown to the colonizers. According to the treaty, the area was assigned to the Spanish. However, after consolidating themselves in northeastern Brazil, the Portuguese began to extend their domains, aiming to colonize the entire territory. The Portuguese domination in Brazil had three main social agents: the settlers, the missionaries and the indigenous people. The missionaries traveled to Brazil with the objective of catechizing the indigenous, while the settlers took advantage of the native to build their domain of goods and power. There was a struggle of interests and motivations between the two European groups. Despite forcing the natives to convert to a new religion, the religious also defended the tribes in the face of the exaggerations committed by the colonists. So, the action of the missionaries was ambiguous, since they denounced the abuses and came into conflict with the colonists and, at the same time, they were part of the Portuguese people, depending on relations with the powerful to maintain themselves.

==== Indigenous enslavement ====
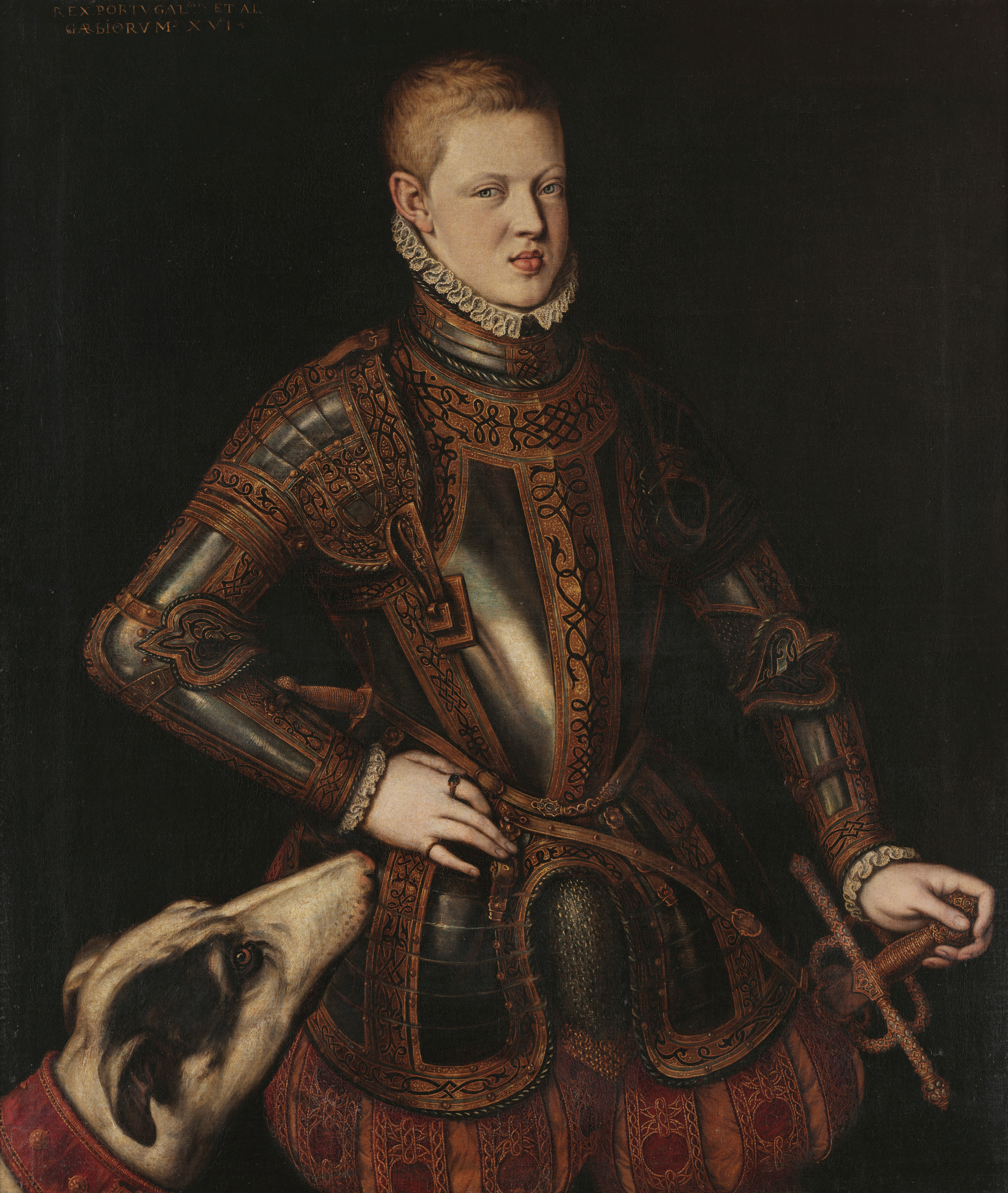
Sebastião I, King of Portugal and the Algarves (reigned 1557 - 1578).

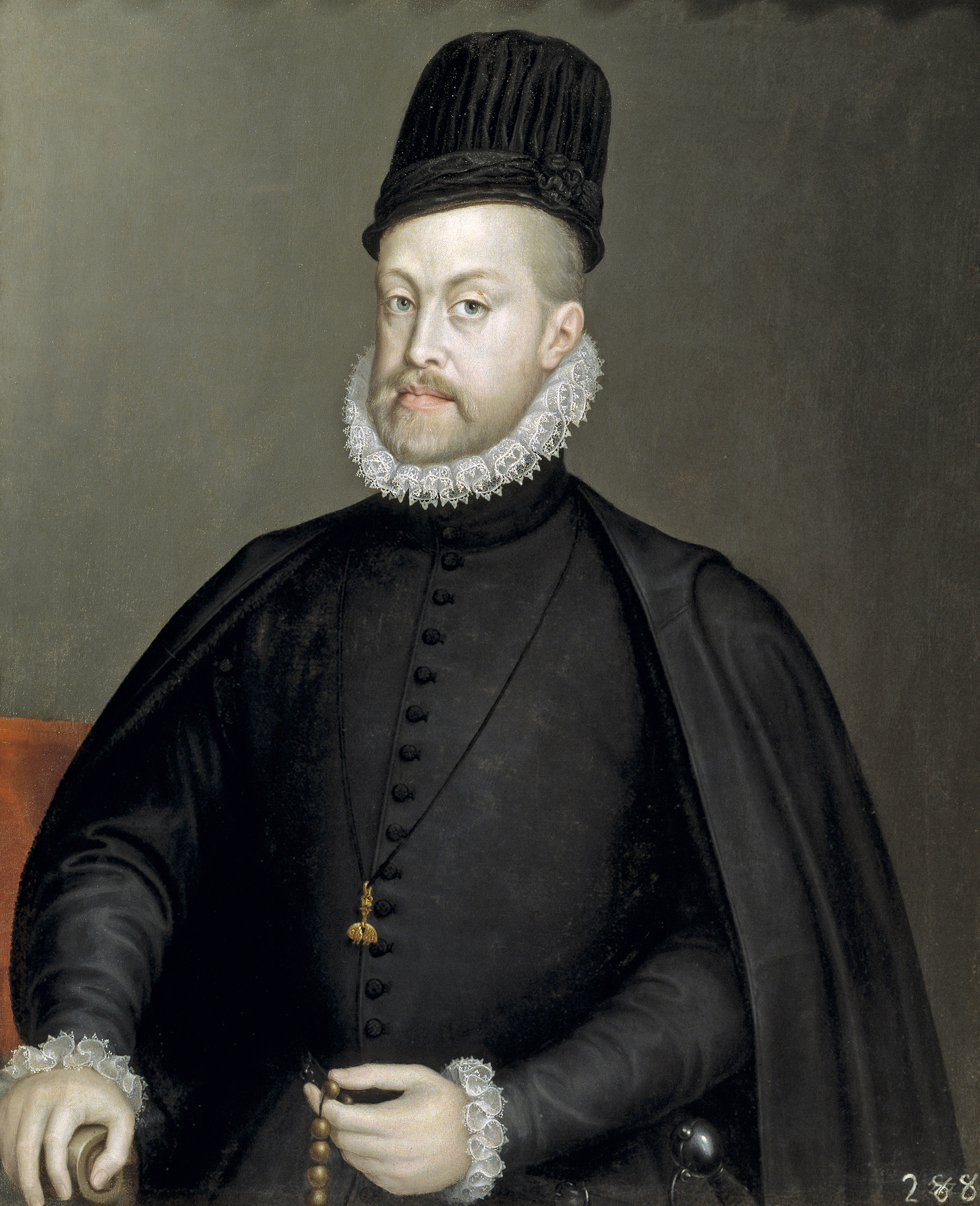
King of Spain from 1556 until his death and also King of Portugal and Algarves as Filipe I from 1581.

In the 16th century, colonists would go into the Brazilian backlands to seize indigenous, who would then be treated as slaves, working for no pay and being traded and sold. There were attempts by the Portuguese themselves to limit this exploitative and servile treatment. On March 20, 1570, King Sebastião promulgated the first law prohibiting this exploitative practice by the colonists. However, the law legitimized the capture of indigenous people in two situations: in just wars fought with the permission of the governor or the king, and when they were to prevent anthropophagy (cannibalism). The colonists began to take advantage of the law's concessions to justify the imprisonment of the indigenous people. Later, King Filipe II was pressured by the missionaries and annulled the sebastian law, determining that the natives could no longer be captured, except in wars ordered by the king. In 1605, Filipe III confirmed his father's decree on the matter. In 1609, the capture of many indigenous people in the town of Jaguaribe, in Ceará, led to a new declaration. Filipe III declared that all Gentiles were free and should be paid for their labor. However, the laws and declarations were not enough to curb the hostilities with the indigenous. The law of 1609 failed to guarantee the freedom of the natives, and two years later, in 1611, Filipe III reaffirmed the freedom of the indigenous and defined that if there were rebellion or wars with the native peoples, the need to make war against them would be discussed in a Junta. Only with approval would the war take place and the colonists could seize the indigenous. In theory, enslavement was restricted and conditional. In practice, there was no control of the abuses committed by the Portuguese and cases of indigenous capture were widespread.

The allied and submissive indigenous had, as much as possible, their freedom guaranteed by the colonizers, because the Portuguese recognized that they were the main workforce and strength to ensure the defense of the territory and the wide exploitation of natural resources. The indigenous who did not resist the colonizing project in Brazil had their lands preserved and earned a fair remuneration. In this sense, slavery was determined by the distinction between the meek indigenous, who adhered to the colonizers' civilization program; and the insubordinate and aggressive indigenous. Often, the same group of indigenous could be considered good and then aggressive. Enslavement was legitimized by just war and ransom, in situations of anthropophagy and other arrests between indigenous from different tribes. The so-called just wars were those aimed at territorial expansion and evangelization of the natives. In the Amazon backlands, especially in Pará, captivity was violent and illegal. Even with the laws, the situation of illegality was not reversed, because the prosperity of expansion and colonization was due to the exploitation of the natives.

==== Amazon colonization ====
The northern region of Brazil was disputed by European countries. During the reigns of the three Filipes in Brazil, there were few colonization groups on the northeastern coast and the goal to expand the colonial territory with expeditions to the interior of the country, exploring the north. The Portuguese occupation of Pará, for example, happened in 1616, with the construction of the Presépio Fort in Belém. Before the Portuguese domination there, the Amazon valley was discovered by the Spanish. Later, the region was explored and occupied by the English and Dutch. In 1542, Francisco de Orellana explored the Amazon from west to east, following the Amazon River, in the same expedition group as Gonzalo Pizarro, who had conquered Peru. In 1545, Francisco de Orellana returned to the Amazon with the title of adelantado, the name given to the first Spaniards who explored the American territory. Francisco was not successful. Only in 1560, there was another Spanish expedition to the region, starting in Peru and reaching the Atlantic Ocean the following year. The members of this expedition murdered the commander, General Pedro de Ursua, during the trip. The Dutch and English expeditions to the Amazon region began in 1596. The Portuguese presence in the Amazon region began in the 16th century, when the captaincies were created. The Portuguese did not carry out expeditions there, which made it possible for other European peoples to enter and occupy the region.

Mercantilist competition transferred the tensions of rivalries among European peoples to the indigenous tribes, causing divisions and conflicts among the tribes of indigenous Brazil and culminating in the formation of colonial Brazil. For political and economic purposes, the English, Dutch and Portuguese established alliances with the native peoples, taking the opportunity to exploit the old tribal rivalries. The collaboration of the natives became an imposition by the Portuguese, who forced the tribes to work and fight for the Lusitanian objectives of expanding the territory and extracting natural wealth for trade. The disputes of the tribes allied to the Portuguese with indigenous people allied to other countries, such as England and Holland, resulted in the capture of prisoners of war, who would serve as slaves to establish Portugal's first facilities in the northern region. In this way, competition for the possession and dominance of indigenous labor played a key role in the formation history of the country.

=== Background ===
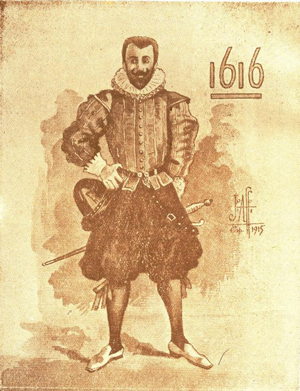
Francisco Caldeira Castelo Branco, Portuguese Captain-Mor, founder of the city of Belém.

Between the years 1614 and 1615, the Portuguese decided to start expanding their territory towards the Amazon region. The occupation of the Amazon begins during the period of the Filipe kings, the time of the Iberian Union. Progress in the conquest of the Amazon began in late 1615, when the Portuguese defeated the French and managed to occupy São Luís. At the beginning of the expeditions in the area, Captain Francisco Caldeira Castelo Branco was in charge. He founded Belém, with the strategic need to protect the Amazon region. Therefore, at the end of 1616, in the region called Feliz Lusitânia (Belém), Castelo Branco ordered the construction of a fort, named Presépio. The indigenous who dominated the region were the Tupinambás, who were not aggressive in this first contact. The colonizers presented the indigenous with tools and other objects they carried. The artillery of São Luís started to occupy the newly built fort. In 1617, Pará began to receive more men, in order to maintain domination in the area. A group of Franciscans, led by Friar Antonio de Merciana, arrived at the site and founded a house, beginning the relationship with the Tupinambás indigenous. In addition to the dangers of the indigenous' behavior, the Portuguese would still face the English and Dutch, who were occupying the nearby areas.

== The revolts ==
Starting in February 1617, the region would be the stage for several conflicts between the Portuguese and the Tupinambás. At first, the indigenous mistrusted the Portuguese, because they knew of other tribes that had been oppressed and captured as slaves by the colonists. There was a clash, because the Tupinambás had a friendly relationship with the French, who were in the region. In the first weeks, there was conflict between the Portuguese and the natives, because Castelo Branco could not maintain a good relationship with the indigenous. In the first revolts, the natives faced settler groups commanded by Sergeant Major Diogo Botelho and Captain Gaspar de Freitas. The fights resulted in the deaths of many natives and the destruction of the villages of Caju and Mortiguera. The Tupinambás suffered abuse and were treated with violence. In reaction to this conduct by the Portuguese, the tribes joined to attack the settlers in the Belém area. However, the Presépio Fort was very close to the indigenous and the Portuguese were able to quickly weaken the movement, thanks to the weapons stored in the fort.

The struggle of the Tupinambás to expel the Portuguese from their land was bloodier and longer than the conflicts with the European peoples who occupied the Amazon territory before. The brutality with which the Portuguese treated the indigenous was a way to put an end to the revolts quickly and to put fear into the others, so that they would not repeat the acts. Most of the rebellious indigenous were killed and some were imprisoned, especially the leaders, who used to be taken away to be killed by cannons. The Tupinambás also conducted raids in the Portuguese settlement, causing tension in the region. In the face of these events, Castelo Branco refused to talk to the king and ask for help. Still in 1617, he asked Ensign Francisco de Medina to attack the enemies by surprise. The attempt failed, because the Portuguese attacked two canoes and the indigenous swam away. In the various battles between the two groups, the indigenous did not have the same weapons as the Portuguese, but they had a good strategy of constantly attacking and retreating, as in a guerrilla war. In early 1618, to protect the settlement, the Portuguese government decided to recruit Bento Maciel Parente, who was appointed assistant to Antonio de Albuquerque in Pernambuco. Bento achieved some victories against the indigenous, which led to a dispute among the Portuguese themselves. Antônio wanted to take credit for the conquest.

On January 13, 1618, the Tupinambás of Pará and Maranhão united in an uprising against the abuses of the Portuguese, in defense of their land. Many indigenous were killed and the abuses continued. Other small uprisings occurred over time, because the indigenous were always on the alert. To make matters worse, Captain Francisco Caldeira Castelo Branco was losing credibility among the Portuguese population. The captain's nephew had murdered a man for no reason and was not punished for his action. Castelo Branco was deposed from his position and returned to Portugal, where he was arrested in 1618. The disagreements were the opportunity for a new attack by the indigenous. Thus, on January 7, 1619, the Tupinambás gathered to attack from the Belém city fort. The indigenous leader, Cabelo de Velha, was killed by the Portuguese. As a result, the settlers cruelly invaded and attacked the villages of Iguape and Guamá.

=== Consequences ===
Brutal conflicts between indigenous and Portuguese resulted in deaths and imprisonments. The relations between the two peoples was marked by violence and imposition of the Lusitanians, often disguised by the presence of missionaries. Baltazar Rodrigues was sent to replace the deposed captain Castelo Branco and had the support of the Captain-Mor Jerônimo Fragoso to contain the conflict situation in the region. With him, Bento Maciel Parente, a settler known for his cruelty, went to the location. The great massacre promoted by him caused the Indians some survivors to become members of the Portuguese army. With the leader Cabelo de Velha dead, the others were forced to suppress the uprising and surrender, becoming prisoners of war. The indigenous uprisings ended up serving the scheme of capturing natives for slave labor, reinforcing the violence committed against them.

== See also ==
- Forte do Presépio
- Francisco Caldeira Castelo Branco
- Diogo Botelho Pereira
- Feliz Lusitânia
- Portuguese colonization of the Americas
- Colonial Brazil
- History of Brazil
