= Aureliano Veloso =

Portuguese politician (1924–2019)

Aureliano Capelo Pires Veloso (25 February 1924 – 12 June 2019) was a Portuguese Socialist Party politician.

He was born in Folgosinho, Gouveia, Guarda District. In 1950 he graduated in Industrial Chemical Engineering from the University of Porto. He was the first democratically elected mayor of Porto in 1976, after the Carnation Revolution of 1974, and served until 1980. In January 2011, he was unanimously awarded the Medal of the City by the council.

He was the older brother of António Pires Veloso (1926–2014), a general who was the last colonial governor of São Tomé and Príncipe and became known as "Viceroy of the North" for his power over Northern Portugal after the Carnation Revolution. He was the father of Rui Veloso (born 1957), a singer-songwriter.
