= Álvaro Caminha =

Captain-major of São Tomé
- In office 29 July 1493 – 28 April 1499
- Monarchs: John II of Portugal; Manuel I of Portugal
- Preceded by: João Pereira
- Succeeded by: Fernão de Melo

Personal details
- Born: Unknown Kingdom of Portugal
- Died: 28 April 1499 São Tomé Island

Álvaro Caminha was appointed by King John II of Portugal in 1492 Captain-major (governor) – the third – of the Portuguese colony of São Tomé and Príncipe which had been discovered 22 years earlier.

He was a knight of the king's household. He was told to settle and "Christianize" the then-deserted island with his family and friars, and for that purpose was given the children of Spanish Jewish refugees from Granada, which had not been able to pay the tax requested by the king, and who were married to Black people from the Congo.
