= List of governors of Portuguese São Tomé and Príncipe =

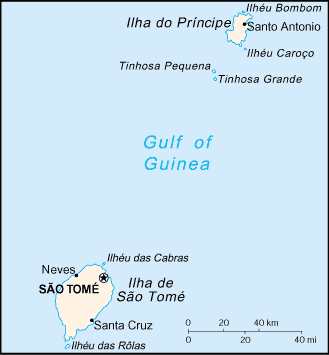
Map of São Tomé and Príncipe.

Coat of arms of Portuguese São Tomé and Príncipe

The islands of São Tomé and Príncipe were discovered and claimed by Portugal in the 1470s. A Portuguese colony was established in 1485. Each island was governed as a separate entity until 1753, when they were united as a single crown colony. In 1951, the islands became an overseas province of Portugal. Autonomy was granted in 1974 and independence was granted on 12 July 1975.

== São Tomé ==
(Dates in italics indicate de facto continuation of office)

| Tenure | Portrait | Incumbent | Notes |
|---|---|---|---|
Portuguese Colony (1485–1522)
| 24 September 1485 to 3 February 1490 | | João de Paiva, Captain | |
| 3 February 1490 to 29 July 1493 | | João Pereira, Captain | |
| 29 July 1493 to 28 April 1499 | | Álvaro Caminha, Captain | |
| 11 December 1499 to c. 1510 | | Fernão de Melo, Captain | |
| c. 1510 to c. 1516 | | ..., Captain | |
| c. 1516 to c. 1517 | | Diogo de Alcáçova, Captain | |
| c. 1517 to 1522 | | João de Melo, Captain | |
Portuguese Crown Colony (1522–1641)
| 1522 to 15.. | | Vasco Estevens, Captain | |
| 15.. to 1531 | | ..., Captain | |
| 1531 to c. 1535 | | Henrique Pereira, Captain | |
| c. 1535 to 1541 | | Gonçalo Álvares, Governor | |
| 1541 to 1545 | | Diogo Botelho Pereira, Captain | |
| 1546 to c. 1554 | | Francisco de Barros de Paiva, Captain | |
| c. 1558 to 15.. | | Pedro Botelho, Captain | |
| 15.. to 1560 | | Ana Chaves, Administrator | ♀; 1st term |
| 1560 to 1564 | | Cristóvão Dória de Sousa, Captain | |
| 1564 to 1569 | | Francisco de Gouveia, Captain | |
| 1569 to 1571 | | Francisco de Pavia Teles, Captain | |
| 1571 to 1575 | | Diogo Salema, Captain | |
| 1575 to c. 1582 | | António Monteiro Maciel, Captain | |
| c. 1582 to c. 1584 | | Ana Chaves, Administrator | ♀; 2nd term |
| c. 1584 to 1586 | | Francisco Fernandes de Figueiredo, Captain | |
| 1586 to 1587 | | Francisco Fernandes de Figueiredo, Governor | |
| 1587 to 1591 | | Miguel Teles de Moura, Governor | |
| 1591 to 1592 | | Duarte Peixoto da Silva, Governor | |
| 1592 to 1593 | | Francisco de Vila Nova, acting Governor | |
| 1593 to 1597 | | Fernandes de Meneses, Governor | |
| 1597 to c. 1598 | | Vasco de Carvalho, Governor | |
| c. 1598 to 1601 | | João Barbosa da Cunha, acting Governor | |
| 1601 to 1604 | | António Maciel Monteiro, acting Governor | |
| 1604 to 160. | | Pedro de Andrade, Governor | |
| 160. to 1609 | | João Barbosa da Cunha, acting Governor | |
| 1609 | | Fernando de Noronha, Governor | |
| 1609 to 1611 | | Constantino Tavares, Governor | |
| 1611 | | João Barbosa da Cunha, acting Governor | |
| 1611 | | Francisco Teles de Meneses, Governor | |
| 1611 to 1613 | | Luís Dias de Abreu, Governor | |
| 1613 to 1614 | | Feliciano Carvalho, Governor | |
| 1614 to 1616 | | Luís Dias de Abreu, Governor | |
| 1616 to 1620 | | Miguel Correia Baharem, Governor | |
| 1620 to 1621 | | Pedro da Cunha, Governor | |
| 1621 to 1623 | | Félix Pereira, Governor | |
| 1623 to 1627 | | Jerónimo de Melo Fernando, Governor | |
| 1627 to 1628 | | André Gonçalves Maracote, Governor | |
| 1628 to 1632 | | Lourenço Pires de Távora, acting Governor | 1st term |
| 1632 | | Francisco Barreto de Meneses, Governor | |
| 1632 to 1636 | | Lourenço Pires de Távora, acting Governor | 2nd term |
| 1636 | | António de Carvalho, Governor | |
| 1636 to 1640 | | Lourenço Pires de Távora, acting Governor | 3rd term |
| 1640 | | Manuel Quaresma Carneiro, Governor | |
| 1640 to 1641 | | Miguel Pereira de Melo e Albuquerque, acting Governor | |
Dutch occupation
| 3 October 1641 to 1648 | | ..., Commander | |
Portuguese Crown Colony (1648–1709)
| 1641 to 1642 | | Paulo da Ponte, acting Governor | |
| 1642 to c. 1650 | | Lourenço Pires de Távora, Governor | 4th term |
| c. 1650 to 1656 | | ..., Governor | |
| 1656 to c. 1657 | | Cristóvão de Barros do Rêgo, Governor | |
| c. 1657 to c. 1661 | | ..., Governor | |
| c. 1661 to 166. | | Pedro da Silva, Governor | |
| 166. to 1669 | | ..., Governor | |
| 1669 to 1671 | | Paulo Ferreira de Noronha, Governor | |
| 1671 to 1673 | Chamber Senate | | |
| 1673 to 1677 | | Julião de Campos Barreto, Governor | |
| 1677 to 1680 | | Bernardim Freire de Andrade, Governor | |
| 1680 to 1683 | | Jacinto de Figueiredo e Abreu, Governor | |
| 1683 to 1686 | | João Álvares da Cunha, acting Governor | |
| 1686 | | António Pereira de Brito Lemos, Governor | |
| 1686 to 1689 | | Bento de Sousa Lima, Governor | |
| 1689 to 1693 | | António Pereira de Lacerda, Governor | |
| 1693 to 1694 | | António de Barredo, Governor | |
| 1695 to 1696 | | José Pereira Sodré, Governor | |
| 1696 to 1697 | | João da Costa Matos, Governor | |
| 1697 to 1702 | | Manuel António Pinheiro da Câmara, Governor | |
| 1702 to 1709 | | José Correia de Castro, Governor | |
| 1709 | | Vicente Dinis Pinheiro, Governor | |
French occupation
| 1709 to 1715 | Junta | | |
Portuguese Crown Colony (1715–1753)
| 1715 to 1716 | | Bartolomeu da Costa Ponte, Governor | |
| 1716 to 1717 | Chamber Senate | | |
| 1717 to 1720 | | António Furtado Mendonça, Governor | |
| 1720 to 1722 | Junta | | |
| 1722 to 1727 | | José Pinheiro da Câmara, Governor | |
| 1727 to 1734 | | Serafim Teixeira Sarmento, Governor | |
| 1734 to 1736 | | Lopo de Sousa Coutinho, Governor | |
| 1736 to 1741 | | José Caetano Soto Maior, Governor | |
| 1741 | | António Ferrão de Castelo Branco, Governor | |
| 1741 to 1744 | Chamber Senate | | |
| 1744 | | Francisco Luís da Conceição, Governor | |
| 1744 to 1745 | | Francisco de Alva Brandão, acting Governor | |
| 1747 to 1748 | | Francisco Luís das Chagas, Governor | |
| 1748 to 1751 | Chamber Senate | | |
| 1751 | | António Rodrigues Neves, Governor | |
| 1751 to 1753 | Chamber Senate | | |

== Príncipe ==
(Dates in italics indicate de facto continuation of office)

| Tenure | Portrait | Incumbent | Notes |
|---|---|---|---|
| 1500 to 3 April 1545 | | António Carneiro, seigneur de Vimioso | |
| 3 April 1545 to 15?? | | Francisco de Alcaçova Carneiro | |
| 15?? to 16?? | | Luís Carneiro | |
| 16?? to 1640 | | Francisco Carneiro | |
| 4 February 1640 to 1690 | | Luís Carneiro de Sousa, comte de Príncipe | |
| 1690 to 7 January 1708 | | Francisco Luís Carneiro de Sousa, comte de Príncipe | |
| 7 January 1708 to 6 November 1724 | | António Carneiro de Sousa, comte de Príncipe | |
| 6 November 1724 to 18 November 1731 | | Francisco Carneiro de Sousa, comte de Príncipe | |
| 18 November 1731 to 29 November 1753 | | Carlos Carneiro de Sousa e Faro, comte de Príncipe | |
| 1753 to 1851 | Unknown | | |
| 1851 to 1852 | | Francisco Ferreira Coelho Cintra | |
| 1852 to 1852 | | Manuel Francisco Landolph | |
| 1852 to 1854 | | Manuel Mariano Ghira | |
| 1854 to 1857 | | Joaquim José de Sousa Osório Menezes | |
| 1857 to 1860 | | João Manuel de Melo | |
| 1862 to 1862 | | João Filipe de Gouveia | |

== São Tomé and Príncipe ==
(Dates in italics indicate de facto continuation of office)

| Tenure | Portrait | Incumbent | Notes |
|---|---|---|---|
Portuguese Crown Colony (1753–1951)
| 1753 to 1755 | Chamber Senate | | |
| 1755 | | Lopo de Sousa Coutinho, Governor | |
| 1755 to 1758 | Chamber Senate | | |
| 1758 to 1761 | | Luís Henrique da Mota e Mele, Governor | |
| 1758 to 1767 | Chamber Senate | | |
| 1767 to 1768 | | Lourenço Lôbo de Almeida Palha, Governor | |
| 1768 to 1770 | Chamber Senate | | |
| 1770 to 1778 | | Vicente Gomes Ferreira, Governor | |
| 1778 to 1782 | | João Manuel de Azambuja, Governor | |
| 1782 to 1788 | | Cristóvão Xavier de Sá, Governor | |
| 1788 to 1797 | | João Resende Tavares Leote, Governor | |
| 1797 | | Inácio Francisco de Nóbrega Sousa Coutinho, Governor | |
| 1797 | | Manuel Monteiro de Carvalho, acting Governor | |
| 1797 to 1798 | | Varela Borca, Governor | |
| 1798 to 1799 | | Manuel Francisco Joaquim da Mota, Governor | |
| 1799 | | Francisco Rafael de Castelo de Vide, Governor | |
| 1799 to 1802 | | João Baptista de Silva, Governor | |
| 1802 to 1805 | | Gabriel António Franco de Castro, Governor | |
| 1805 to 1817 | | Luís Joaquim Lisboa, Governor | |
| 1817 to 1824 | | Filipe de Freitas, Governor | |
| 1824 to 1830 | | João Maria Xavier de Brito, Governor | |
| 1830 to 1834 | | Joaquim Bento da Fonseca, Governor | |
| 1834 to 1836 | Provisional government | | |
| 1836 to 1837 | | Fernando Correia Henriques de Noronha, acting Governor | |
| 1837 to 1838 | | Leandro José da Costa, Governor | 1st term |
| 1838 to 1839 | | José Joaquim de Urbanski, Governor | |
| 1839 to 1843 | | Bernardo José de Sousa Soares de Andréa, Governor | |
| 5 February 1843 to 2 March 1843 | | Leandro José da Costa, Governor | 2nd term |
| 2 March 1843 to 1 May 1846 | | José Maria Marquês, Governor | 1st term |
| 1 May 1846 to 30 September 1847 | Chamber Senate | | |
| 30 September 1847 to 20 November 1847 | | Carlos Augusto de Morais e Almeida, Governor | |
| 20 November 1847 to 20 July 1848 | Chamber Senate | | |
| 20 July 1848 to 30 June 1849 | | José Caetano René Vimont Pessoa, Governor | |
| 12 December 1849 to 9 March 1851 | | Leandro José da Costa, Governor | 3rd term |
| 9 March 1851 to 20 March 1853 | | José Maria Marquês, Governor | 2nd term |
| 20 March 1853 to 28 July 1855 | | Francisco José da Pina Rolo, Governor | |
| 28 July 1855 to 21 March 1857 | | Adriano Maria Passaláqua, Governor | |
| 21 March 1857 to 15 January 1858 | Chamber Senate | | |
| 15 January 1858 to 29 May 1858 | | Francisco António Correia, Governor | |
| 29 May 1858 to 1859 | Chamber Senate | | |
| 1859 to 21 November 1860 | | Luís José Pereira e Horta, Governor | |
| 21 November 1860 to 8 July 1862 | | José Pedro de Melo, Governor | |
| 8 July 1862 to 17 November 1862 | Chamber Senate | | |
| 17 November 1862 to 30 March 1863 | | José Eduardo da Costa Moura, Governor | |
| 30 March 1863 to 8 January 1864 | | João Baptista Brunachy, Governor | 1st term |
| 8 January 1864 to 2 August 1865 | | Estanislau Xavier de Assunção e Almeida, Governor | 1st term |
| 2 August 1865 to 30 July 1867 | | João Baptista Brunachy, Governor | 2nd term |
| 30 July 1867 to 30 September 1867 | | António Joaquim da Fonseca, Governor | |
| 30 September 1867 to 30 May 1869 | | Estanislau Xavier de Assunção e Almeida, Governor | 2nd term |
| 30 May 1869 to 7 October 1872 | | Pedro Carlos de Aguiar Craveiro Lopes, Governor | |
| 7 October 1872 to July 1873 | | João Clímaco de Carvalho, Governor | |
| 28 October 1873 to 1 November 1876 | | Gregório José Ribeiro, Governor | |
| 1 November 1876 to 28 September 1879 | | Estanislau Xavier de Assunção e Almeida, Governor | 3rd term |
| 28 September 1879 to 28 November 1879 | | Francisco Ferreira do Amaral, Governor | |
| 28 November 1879 to 3 January 1880 | | Custódio Miguel de Borja, acting Governor | 1st term |
| 3 January 1880 to 30 December 1881 | | Vicente Pinheiro Lôbo Machado de Melo e Almada, Governor | |
| 30 December 1881 to 26 January 1882 | | Augusto Maria Leão, acting Governor | |
| 26 January 1882 to 24 May 1884 | | Francisco Teixeira da Silva, Governor | |
| 24 May 1884 to 25 August 1886 | | Custódio Miguel de Borja, Governor | 2nd term |
| 25 August 1886 to 9 March 1890 | | Augusto César Rodrigues Sarmento, Governor | |
| 9 March 1890 to 26 June 1891 | | Firmino José da Costa, Governor | |
| 26 June 1891 to 8 December 1894 | | Francisco Eugénio Pereira de Miranda, Governor | |
| 8 December 1894 to 8 April 1895 | | Jaime Lobo Brito Godins, acting Governor | |
| 8 April 1895 to 5 April 1897 | | Cipriano Leite Pereira Jardim, Governor | |
| 5 April 1897 to 5 April 1899 | | Joaquim da Graça Correia e Lança, Governor | |
| 5 April 1899 to 3 January 1901 | | Amâncio de Alpoim Cerqueira Borges Cabral, Governor | |
| 3 January 1901 to 8 May 1901 | | Francisco Maria Peixoto Vieira, acting Governor | |
| 8 May 1901 to 8 October 1902 | | Joaquim Xavier de Brito, Governor | |
| 8 October 1902 to 7 June 1903 | | João Abel Antunes Mesquita Guimarães, Governor | |
| 7 June 1903 to 14 December 1903 | | João Gregório Duarte Ferreira, acting Governor | 1st term |
| 14 December 1903 to 13 April 1907 | | Francisco de Paula Cid, Governor | |
| 13 April 1907 to 24 June 1907 | | Vítor Augusto Chaves Lemos e Melo, acting Governor | 1st term |
| 24 June 1907 to 24 October 1908 | | Pedro Berquó, Governor | |
| 24 October 1908 to 13 March 1909 | | Vítor Augusto Chaves Lemos e Melo, acting Governor | 2nd term |
| 13 March 1909 to 13 June 1910 | | José Augusto Vieira da Fonseca, Governor | |
| 13 June 1910 to 7 August 1910 | | Jaime Daniel Leote do Rego, Governor | 1st term |
| 7 August 1910 to 11 November 1910 | | Fernando Augusto de Carvalho, Governor | |
| 12 November 1910 to 28 November 1910 | | Carlos de Mendonça Pimentel e Melo, acting Governor | |
| 28 November 1910 to 14 June 1911 | | António Pinto Miranda Guedes, Governor | |
| 14 June 1911 to 24 December 1911 | | Jaime Daniel Leote do Rego, Governor | 2nd term |
| 24 December 1911 to 13 May 1913 | | Mariano Martins, Governor | |
| 13 May 1913 to 31 May 1915 | | Pedro do Amaral Boto Machado, Governor | |
| 31 May 1915 to 6 June 1915 | | José Dionísio Carneiro de Sousa e Faro, Governor | |
| 6 June 1915 to 28 July 1918 | | Rafael dos Santos Oliveira, acting Governor | |
| 28 July 1918 to 11 June 1919 | | João Gregório Duarte Ferreira, Governor | 2nd term |
| 11 June 1919 to 25 September 1920 | | Avelino Augusto de Oliveira Leite, Governor | |
| 25 September 1920 to 22 October 1920 | | José Augusto de Conceição Alves Vélez, acting Governor | |
| 22 October 1920 to 2 July 1921 | | Eduardo Nogueira de Lemos, acting Governor | |
| 2 July 1921 to 23 January 1924 | | António José Pereira, Governor | |
| 23 January 1924 to 8 July 1926 | | Eugénio de Barros Soares Branco, Governor | |
| 8 July 1926 to 31 August 1928 | | José Duarte Junqueira Rato, Governor | |
| 31 August 1928 to 30 January 1929 | | Sebastião José Barbosa, acting Governor | |
| 30 January 1929 to 31 August 1929 | | Francisco Penteado, Governor | |
| 31 August 1929 to 17 December 1933 | | Luís Augusto Vieira Fernandes, Governor | |
| 17 December 1933 to 8 May 1941 | | Ricardo Vaz Monteiro, Governor | |
| 8 May 1941 to 5 April 1945 | | Amadeu Gomes de Figueiredo, Governor | |
| 5 April 1945 to July 1948 | | Carlos de Sousa Gorgulho, Governor | |
| July 1948 to 8 October 1950 | | Afonso Manuel Machado de Sousa, acting Governor | |
| 8 October 1950 to 11 June 1951 | | Mário José Cabral Oliveira Castro, acting Governor | |
Overseas Province of Portugal (1951–1974)
| 11 June 1951 to 28 June 1952 | | Mário José Cabral Oliveira Castro, acting Governor | |
| 28 June 1952 to 18 April 1953 | | Guilherme António Amaral Abranches Pinto, acting Governor | Served at the time of the Batepá massacre |
| 18 April 1953 to 19 May 1953 | | Fernando Augusto Rodrigues, acting Governor | |
| 19 May 1953 to July 1953 | | Afonso Manuel Machado de Sousa, acting Governor | |
| July 1953 to August 1954 | | Francisco António Pires Barata, Governor | |
| August 1954 to 15 June 1955 | | Luís da Câmara Leme Faria, acting Governor | |
| 15 June 1955 to 5 December 1956 | | José Machado, acting Governor | |
| 5 December 1956 to 13 October 1957 | | Octávio Ferreira Gonçalves, acting Governor | |
| 13 October 1957 to August 1963 | | Manuel Marques de Abrantes Amaral, Governor | |
| August 1963 to 30 October 1963 | | Alberto Monteiro de Sousa Campos, acting Governor | |
| 30 October 1963 to 1972 | | António Jorge da Silva Sebastião, Governor | |
| 1973 to 1974 | | João Cecilio Gonçalves, Governor | |
| 29 July 1974 to 18 December 1974 | | António Pires Veloso, Governor | |
Autonomous Province of Portugal (1974–1975)
| 18 December 1974 to 12 July 1975 | | António Pires Veloso, High Commissioner | |
| 12 July 1975 | Independence as Democratic Republic of São Tomé and Príncipe | | |

== See also ==
- History of São Tomé and Príncipe
- Politics of São Tomé and Príncipe
- List of presidents of São Tomé and Príncipe
- List of prime ministers of São Tomé and Príncipe
- List of presidents of the Regional Government of Príncipe
- Ministry of Foreign Affairs, Cooperation and Communities
