= Forte do Presépio =

Fort in Belém, Brazil

- Forte do Castelo do Senhor Santo Cristo do Presépio de Belém
- Belém, Pará in Brazil
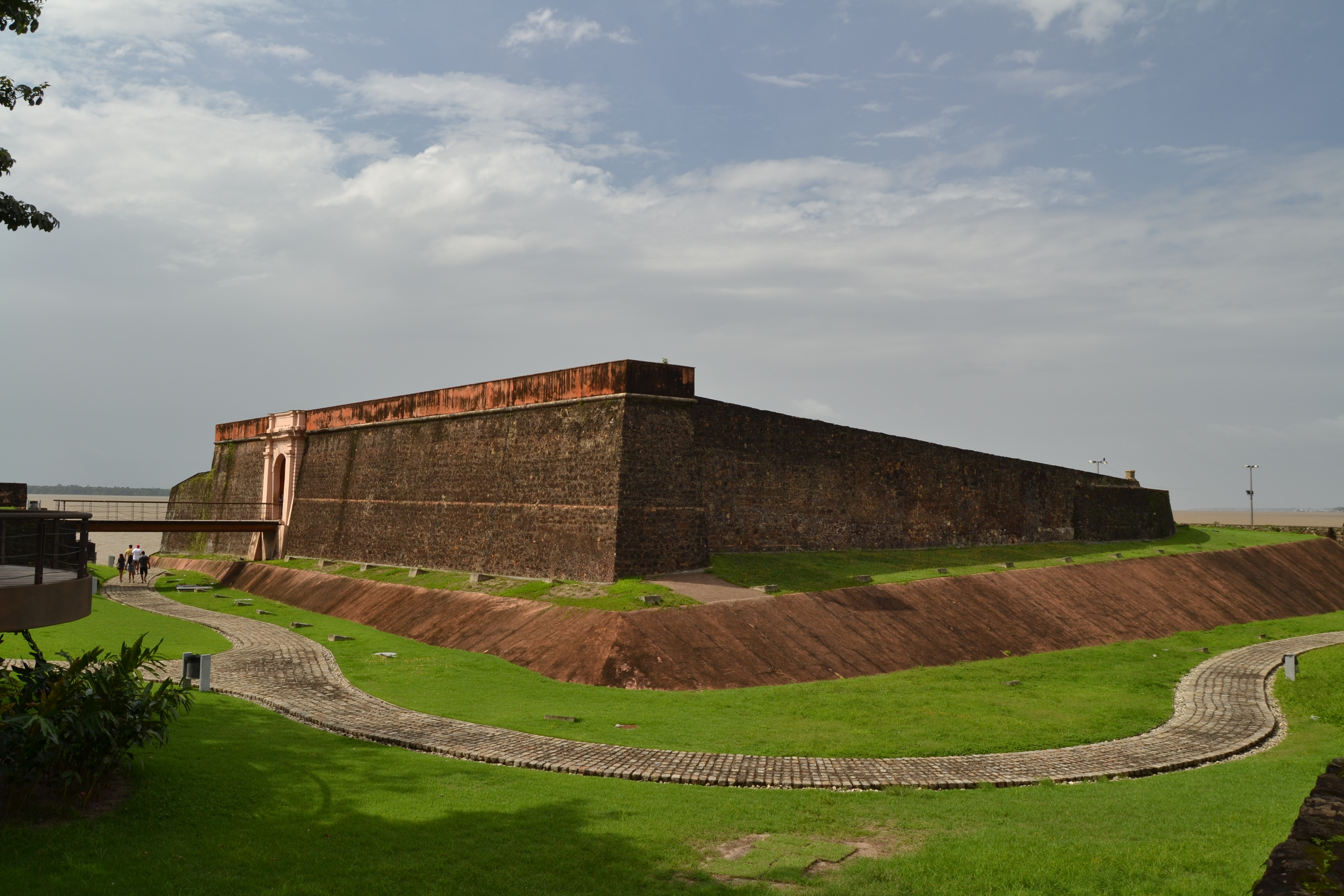

Site information
- Type: Fort

Location
- Location of Forte do Presépio in Brazil
- Coordinates: 1.454444°S 48.505278°W

Site history
- Built: 1616
- Built by: Francisco Caldeira Castelo Branco

National Historic Heritage of Brazil
- Designated: 1961
- Reference no.: 644

Forte do Presépio (formally Forte do Castelo do Senhor Santo Cristo do Presépio de Belém) is a fort located in Belém, Pará, Brazil. It was built in 1616 by Francisco Caldeira Castelo Branco at Maúri Point, a promontory on the right bank of the mouth of the Guamá River and Guajará Bay. The first chapel in Belém was located in the fort. It was a temporary structure and was dedicated to Our Lady of Grace, and was moved a few years later to the current Largo da Sé, and became the Cathedral of Our Lady of Grace in the 18th century. The fort was listed as a historic structure by the National Historic and Artistic Heritage Institute in 1961.

== See also ==
- Military history of Brazil
- Tupinambás Uprising
