= Francisco Caldeira Castelo Branco =

Portuguese colonial official in Brazil (1566–1619)

Francisco Castelo Branco
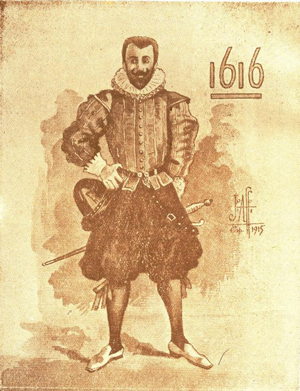
- Francisco Caldeira Castelo Branco as depicted by João Affonso do Nascimento, 1915

Captain-Major of Captaincy the Rio Grande, Captain-Major of Captaincy of Bahia, Governor General of Captaincy of Grão-Pará
- In office 1612–1614
- Monarch: Philip II of Portugal

Captain-major of Bahia
- In office 1615–1618
- Monarch: Philip II of Portugal

Personal details
- Born: 1566 Castelo Branco, Kingdom of Portugal
- Died: 1619 (aged 52–53) Lisbon, Kingdom of Portugal
- Citizenship: Kingdom of Portugal

Military service
- Allegiance: Portuguese Empire
- Battles/wars: Dutch-Portuguese War

Francisco Caldeira Castelo Branco (1566–1619) was a Portuguese explorer and colonial administrator. He is noted as the founder of the city of Belém, capital of Pará, Brazil, on 12 January 1616. Caldeira served as the first Governor General (Governador Geral) of the Captaincy of Grão-Pará.

== Biography ==
Caldeira was born in Castelo Branco, a city in central Portugal, in 1566. More recent sources indicate that he was born in Crato in the district of Portalegre, also in Portugal. Caldeira first served as Captain-major of the Captaincy the Rio Grande (now the Brazilian state of Rio Grande do Norte) from 1612 to 1614, and the Captaincy of Bahia from 1615 to 1618.

Caldeira was sent as the commander of an expedition to rescue the Portuguese troops while serving in the garrison of Pernambuco. The Portuguese troops, under the command of Jerónimo de Albuquerque Maranhão, fought against the French in Maranhão. Caldeira was given the rank of Capitão-Mor in 1615 by Alexandre de Moura after the defeat of the French. Moura then ordered him to explore and conquer Pará.

On January 12, Francisco Caldeira arrived at Guajará Bay, called by the Tupinambás, "Guaçu Paraná". He built a wooden fort, covered with straw, and called it "Presépio de Belém", or the Crib of Bethlehem. It is now known as the Forte do Presépio. A colony formed around the fort, which Caldeira called "Feliz Lusitania" (Happy Lusitania). The settlement was the embryo of the city of Belém. Colonisation under Caldiera was initially peaceful and without opposition from the indigenous people of Pará.

Francisco Caldeira, as the head of the new colony, was considered authoritarian and disruptive. A memorial by the Governor-General of Brazil addressed to the King of Portugal requested his removal as early as 1617. It was alleged that Caldeira be removed from that post "where he causes a thousand disturbances, unsettles the Indians, and puts someone else in their place to keep them as it suits him, so they do not rebel".

Antonio Cabral, a nephew of Francisco Caldeira, stabbed captain Alvaro Neto to death in 1618. The captains Paulo da Rocha and Thadeus dos Passos, friends of Alvaro Neto, pressured Francisco Caldeira to arrest his nephew. Caldeira, however, set him free a few days later claiming that his nephew would be needed for a coming conflict with indigenous peoples. He also ordered that the two captains be jailed. Paulo da Rocha and Thadeus dos Passos took refuge at the Church and Convent of Saint Antony, a Franciscan convent on the outer limits of the colony. The population of Belém rose up against Francisco Caldeira in the morning of the next day and surrounded his home. He was jailed and deposed without resistance; Baltasar Rodrigues de Melo took his position as Governor General of the Captaincy of Grão-Pará.

Francisco Caldeira was sent to Lisbon after being deposed in Pará and died in prison in 1619.

== See also ==
- Tupinambás Uprising
