= Fusta =

Type of ship

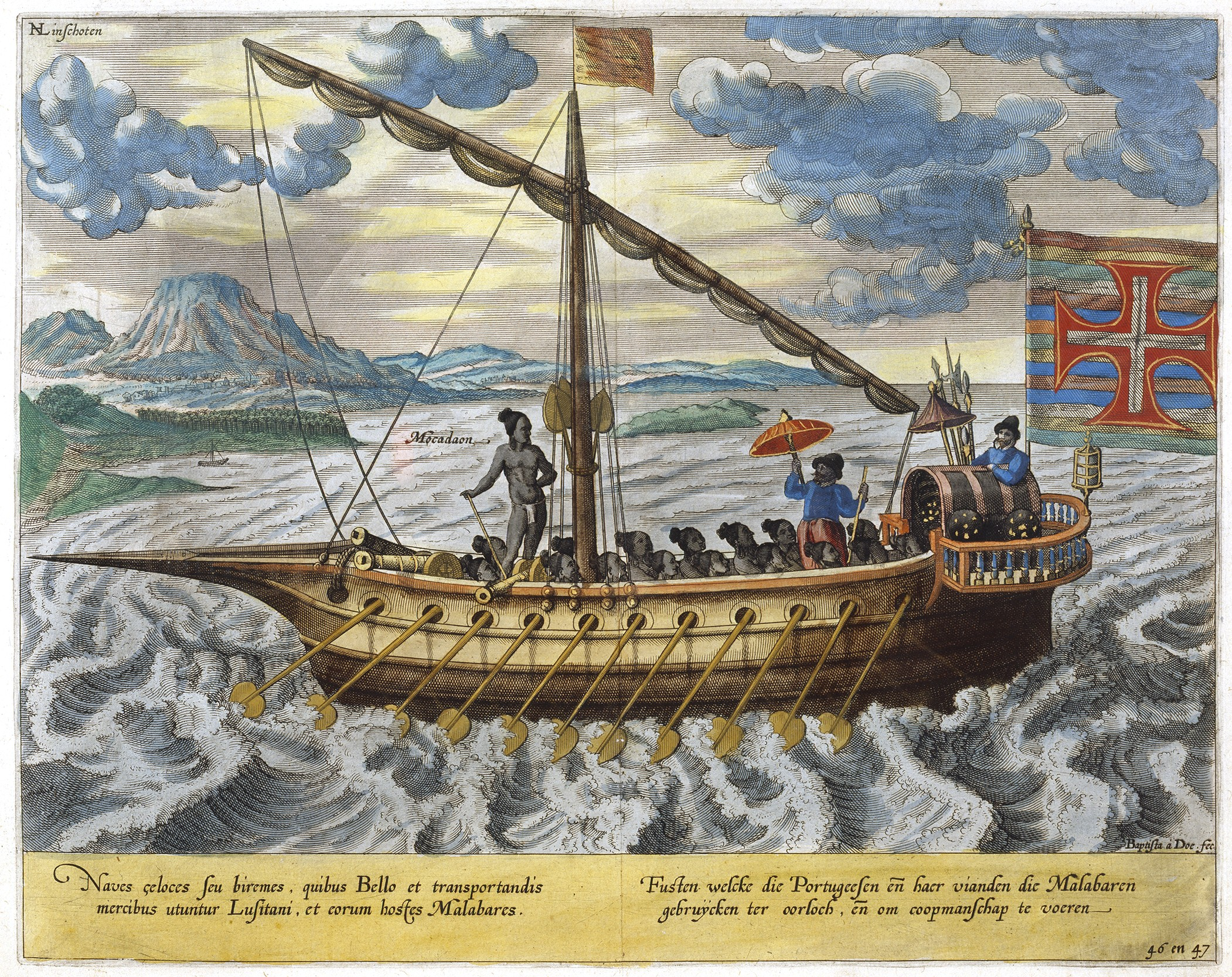
Portuguese fusta from a book by Jan Huygen van Linschoten

The fusta or fuste (also called foist) was a narrow, light and fast ship with shallow draft, powered by both oars and sail—in essence a small galley. It typically had 12 to 18 two-man rowing benches on each side, a single mast with a lateen (triangular) sail, and usually carried two or three guns. The sail was used to cruise and save the rowers’ energy, while the oars propelled the ship in and out of harbor and during combat.

The fusta was the favorite ship of the North African corsairs of Salé and the Barbary Coast. Its speed, mobility, capability to move without wind, and its ability to operate in shallow water—crucial for hiding in coastal waters before pouncing on a passing ship—made it ideal for war and piracy. It was mainly with fustas that the Barbarossa brothers, Baba Aruj and Khair ad Din, carried out the Ottoman conquest of North Africa and the rescue of Mudéjars and Moriscos from Spain after the fall of Granada, and that they and the other North African corsairs used to wreak terror upon Christian shipping and the islands and coastal areas of the Mediterranean in the 16th and 17th centuries.

The Portuguese used this vessel extensively in the 15th and 16th century in north-Africa as well, and introduced it to the Indian Ocean where it was especially suitable for patrolling and raiding in shallow coastal and river waters. In 1535, Portuguese navigator Diogo Botelho Pereira sailed a fusta from India back to Portugal.
