= Diogo Botelho Pereira =

Portuguese nobleman, navigator and cartographer

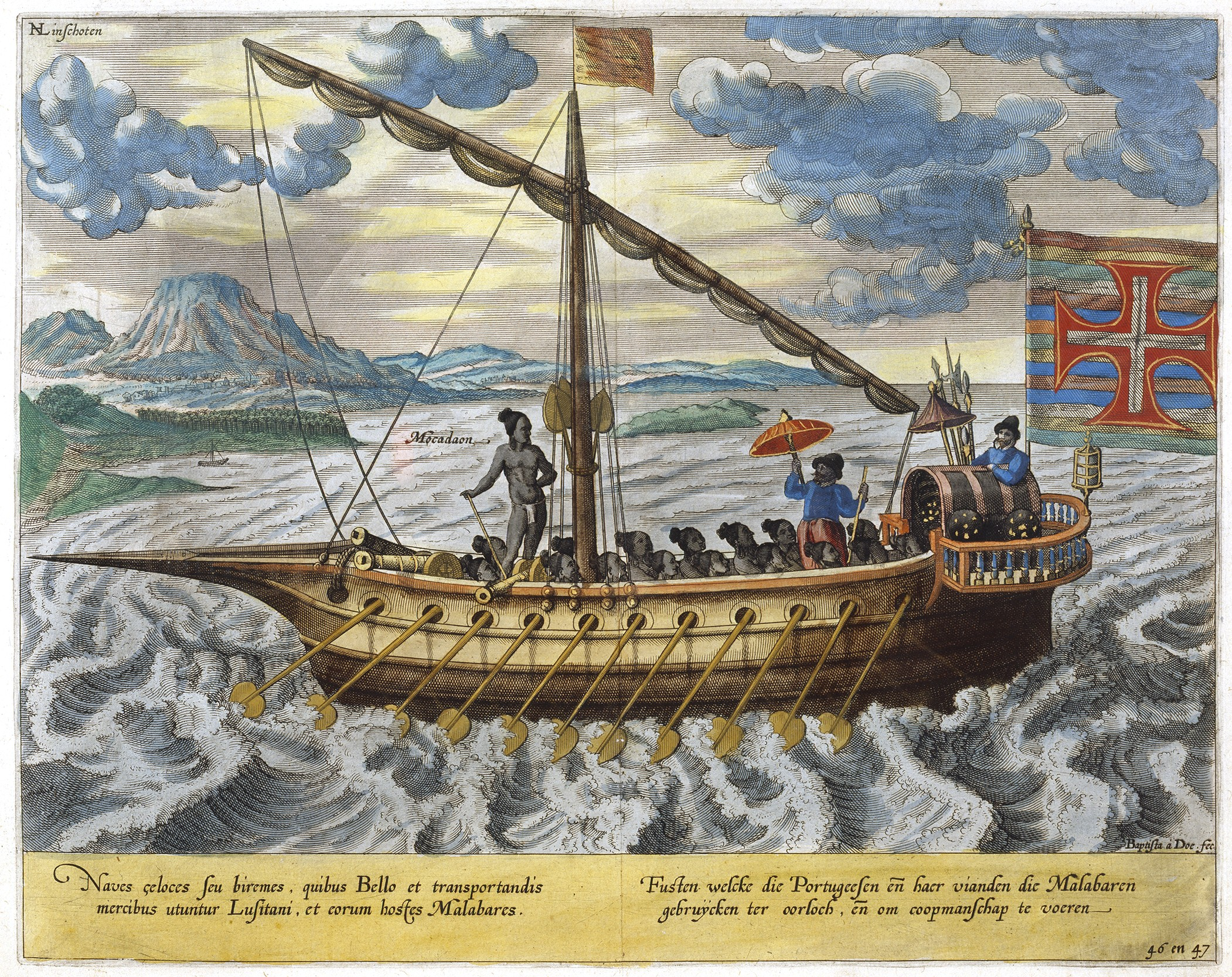
Portuguese fusta as depicted by Jan Huygen van Linschoten, similar to what Diogo Botelho might have used

Diogo Botelho Pereira was a 16th-century Portuguese nobleman, colonial official, navigator and cartographer. He famously undertook a daring voyage by sea from India back to Portugal aboard a fusta.

Born in Portuguese India, Botelho was the son of Iria Pereira and António Real, captain of Fort Emmanuel of Cochin. In India, Botelho learned to navigate and compiled detailed portolan charts for the Portuguese navy, in the service of which he commanded ships of the Portuguese India Armadas and participated in military expeditions.

Coming to Lisbon, King John III granted him an official title of fidalgo, but Pereira fell out of royal favour over disagreements with the monarch regarding his proper compensation for services to the Crown, and was instead banished to India in perpetuity. This motivated his audacious enterprise of sailing a minuscule vessel from India back to Portugal, between November 1535 and May 1536, bearing the first news of the construction of the Portuguese fortress of Diu, to prove his worth and loyalty. King John awarded him with the post of captain of São Tomé, between 1541 and 1545, but his vessel was destroyed, to prevent rival European nations from presupposing that the voyage to the East might be easily undertaken, and Portugal's monopoly challenged.

Pereira continued serving in the royal Portuguese navy afterwards, sailing ships linking Lisbon and Goa; in 1549 he commanded a fleet of five carracks bound to India, and returned in 1551. Later in his life he was attributed the post of captain of the Portuguese fortress of Canannore in India.

== See also ==
- List of governors of Portuguese São Tomé and Príncipe
