= Portuguese São Tomé and Príncipe =

1485–1975 Portuguese island colony in Central Africa

Overseas Province of São Tomé and Príncipe Província Ultramarina de São Tomé e Príncipe (Portuguese)
- 1485–1975
- Flag (1910–1975) Coat of arms (1951–1975)
- Anthem: "Hymno Patriótico" (1808–1826); Patriotic Anthem "Hino da Carta" (1826–1910); Hymn of the Charter "A Portuguesa" (1910–1975); The Portuguese
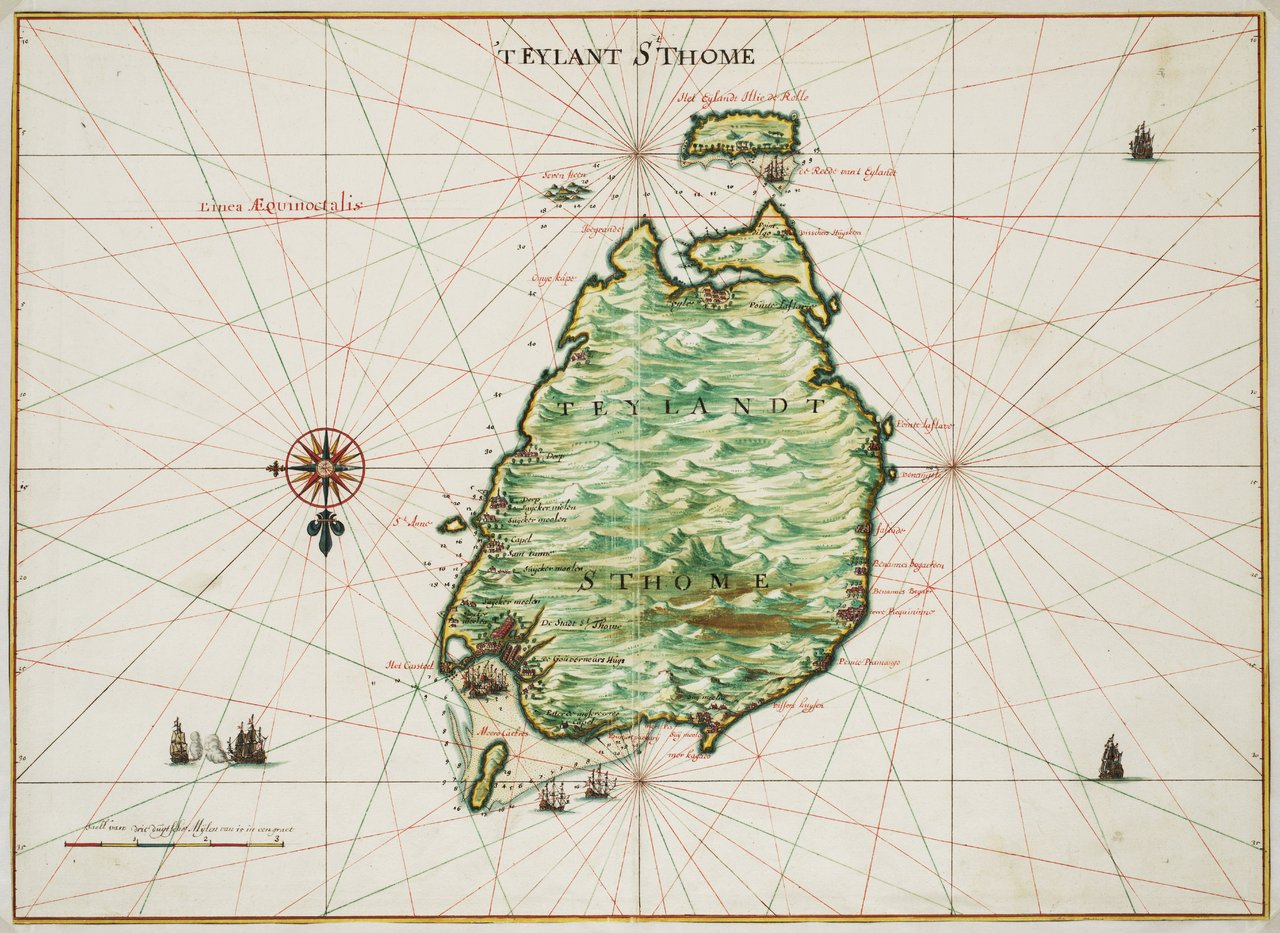
- Dutch map of São Tomé and Príncipe in 1665
- Status: Colony of the Portuguese Empire (1485–1951); Overseas province of the Portuguese Empire (1951–1975)
- Capital: São Tomé; 0°13′47″N 6°35′51″E
- Common languages: Portuguese
- Head of state
  - 1470–1481: Afonso V of Portugal
  - 1974–75: Francisco da Costa Gomes
- Governor
  - 1485–1490 (first): João de Paiva
  - 1974–75 (last): António Elísio Capelo Pires Veloso
- Historical era: Imperialism
  - Established: 1485
  - Independence of São Tomé and Príncipe: 12 July 1975
- Currency: São Tomé and Príncipe escudo
- ISO 3166 code: ST
Succeeded by
São Tomé and Príncipe
- Today part of: São Tomé and Príncipe

Portuguese São Tomé and Príncipe (Portuguese: São Tomé e Príncipe Português) was a colony of the Portuguese Empire from the discovery of the São Tomé and Príncipe islands in 1470 until 1975, when independence was granted by Portugal.

== History ==
The Portuguese explorers João de Santarém and Pêro Escobar discovered the islands around 1470, which they found uninhabited. São Tomé Island was named by the Portuguese in honor of Saint Thomas, as they discovered the island on his feast day, while the island of Príncipe (Prince's island) was named in honor of Afonso, Prince of Portugal, his father's favorite.

The first attempt to settle the islands began in 1485, when the Portuguese Crown granted João de Paiva the island of São Tomé. However, this attempt was not successful because the settlers were unable to produce food in the specific conditions and climate that the islands offered, and because of the tropical diseases that affected the settlers. It was only in 1493 when King John II of Portugal nominated Álvaro Caminha as captain-major of São Tomé Island that the first successful settlement was established. Among these Portuguese settlers, there was a significant portion of criminals and orphans, as well as Jewish children taken from their parents to ensure that they were raised as Christians. The settlement of Príncipe was initiated in 1500.

In the following years, Portuguese settlers started to import large numbers of slaves from mainland Africa to cultivate the rich volcanic soil of São Tomé Island with highly profitable sugar cane. By the middle of the 16th century, São Tomé was generating enormous wealth for Portugal as it became the world's largest producer of sugar. The humid climate allowed for the quick growth of sugar, but prevented the production of higher quality white sugar.

In the first decade of the 17th century, the competition of sugar plantations from the Portuguese colony of Brazil and the frequent slave revolts that occurred in the island began to slowly hurt the sugar crop cultivation. This meant the decline of sugar production and the shifting of the local economy towards the slave trade, which remained mostly in the hands of the local mestiço population. The geographical location of the islands made them a crucial trading post of the transatlantic slave trade as they served as an assembly point for slaves brought from the Gulf of Guinea and the Kingdom of Kongo that were destined for the Americas.

The Dutch occupied São Tomé Island from 1641 to 1648, when the Portuguese took back the island. The Dutch, however, did not take Príncipe island.

Most Portuguese settlers married African women. Europeans never numbered more than 1000 at their peak in the 16th century; by the 18th century, prosperous and influential local Afro-Portuguese mulatos came to fill important local positions, such as cathedral chapter and the town-hall, into which they had been admitted as early as 1528. Some were indistinguishable from mainland native Africans and claimed to be brancos da terra (literally, "the land's whites") on account of their ancestry.

In 1753, because of frequent attacks by pirates and corsairs, the capital of São Tomé was transferred to Santo António on Príncipe, and the islands started being ruled as a single colony with one Governor. It was only in 1852 when the capital was transferred back to São Tomé Island.

At the beginning of the 19th century, the Portuguese introduced coffee and cocoa in extensive large-scale plantations called roças, thus giving a great boost to the economy. The coffee production cycle ended in the late 19th century, when it was replaced by cocoa as the islands' main production. São Tomé and Príncipe then became a major global cocoa production area for several generations, and in the first decades of the 20th century it was frequently the world's annual number one cocoa producer.

In 1972, a nationalist political party of Marxist ideology, the Movement for the Liberation of São Tomé and Príncipe (MLSTP), was created by exiles in Equatorial Guinea with the intent of creating an independent nation. The Carnation Revolution in 1974 ended the Estado Novo dictatorship in Portugal and initiated a process of decolonization of the Portuguese colonies in Africa. On 12 July 1975, the new Portuguese regime granted independence to São Tomé and Príncipe.

== Gallery ==
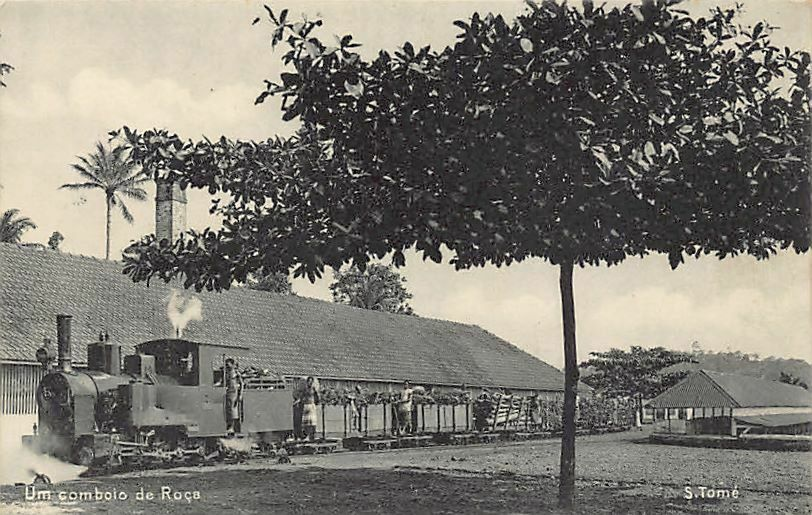
A plantation train in 1910.

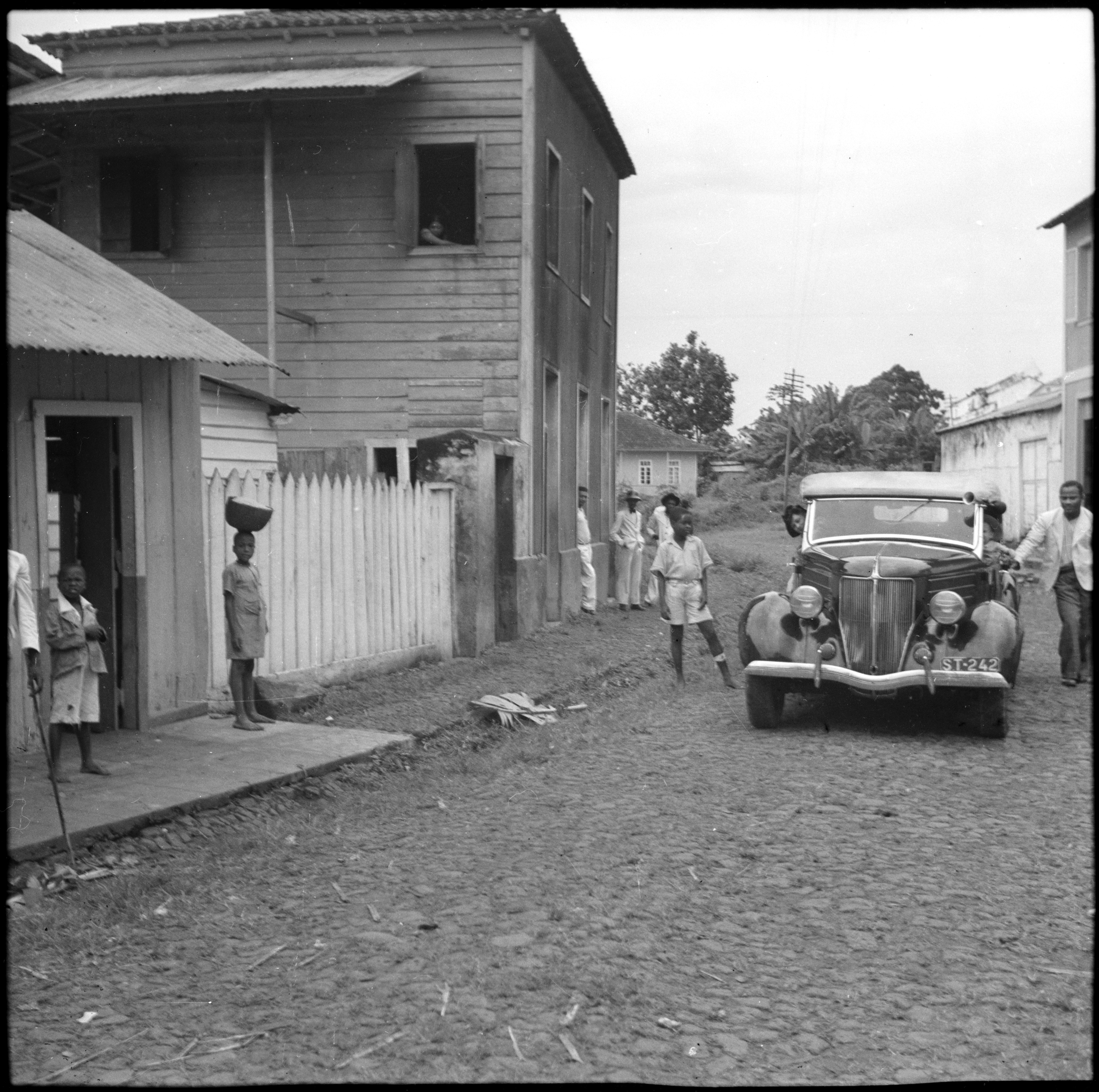
A street in São Tomé, in 1941–1942.

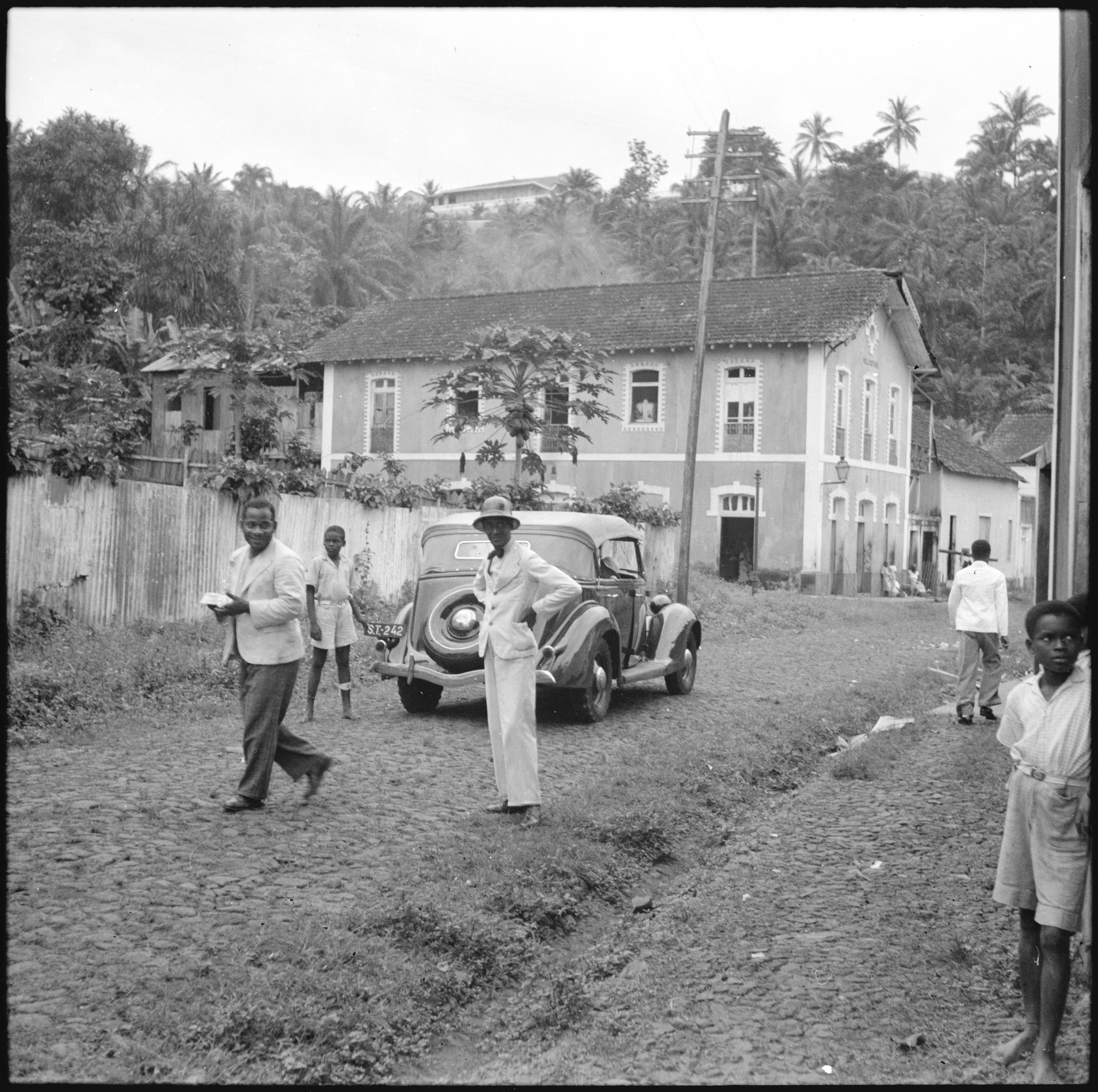
São Tomé, 1941–1942.

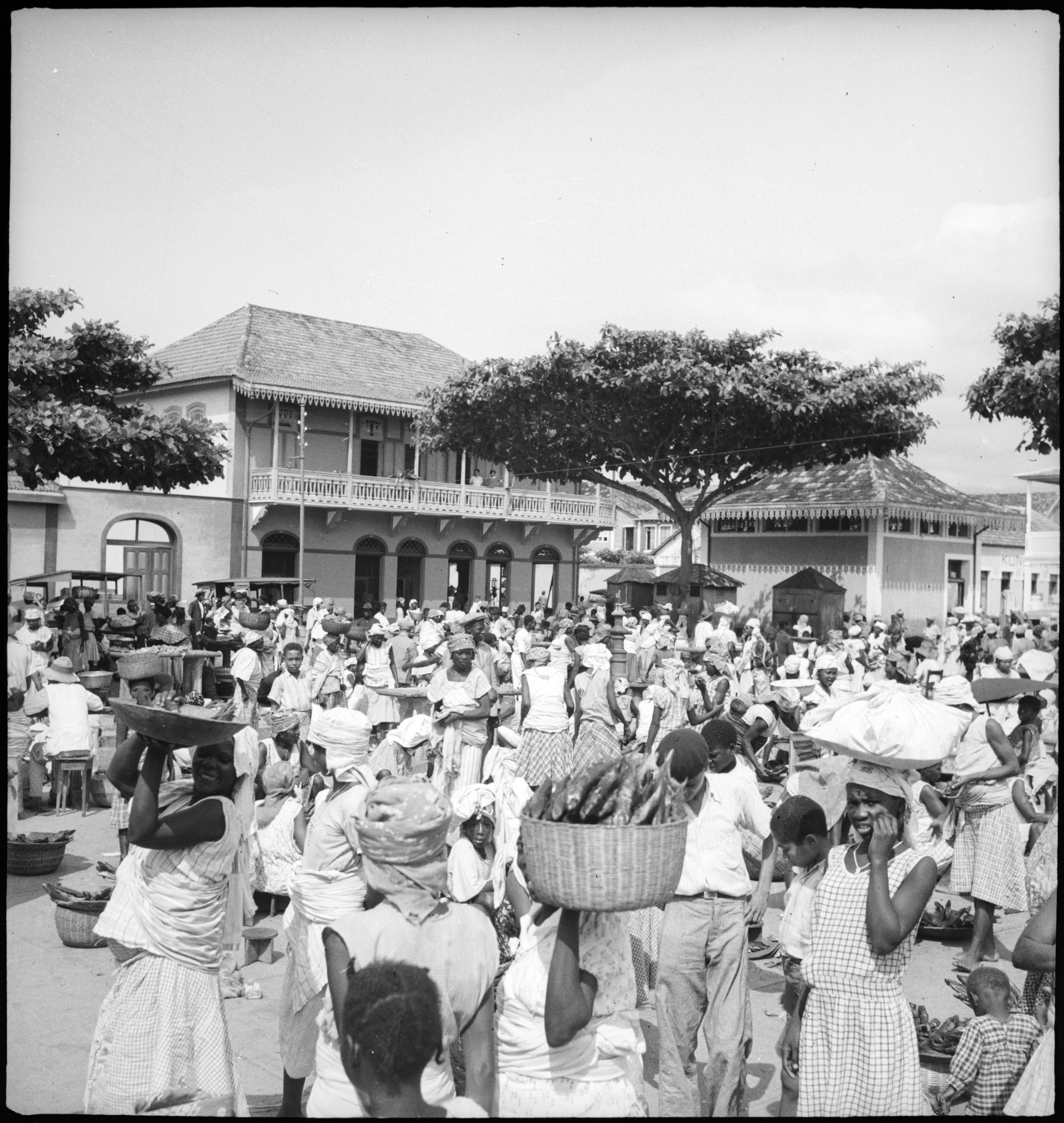
Marketplace in São Tomé, 1941–1942

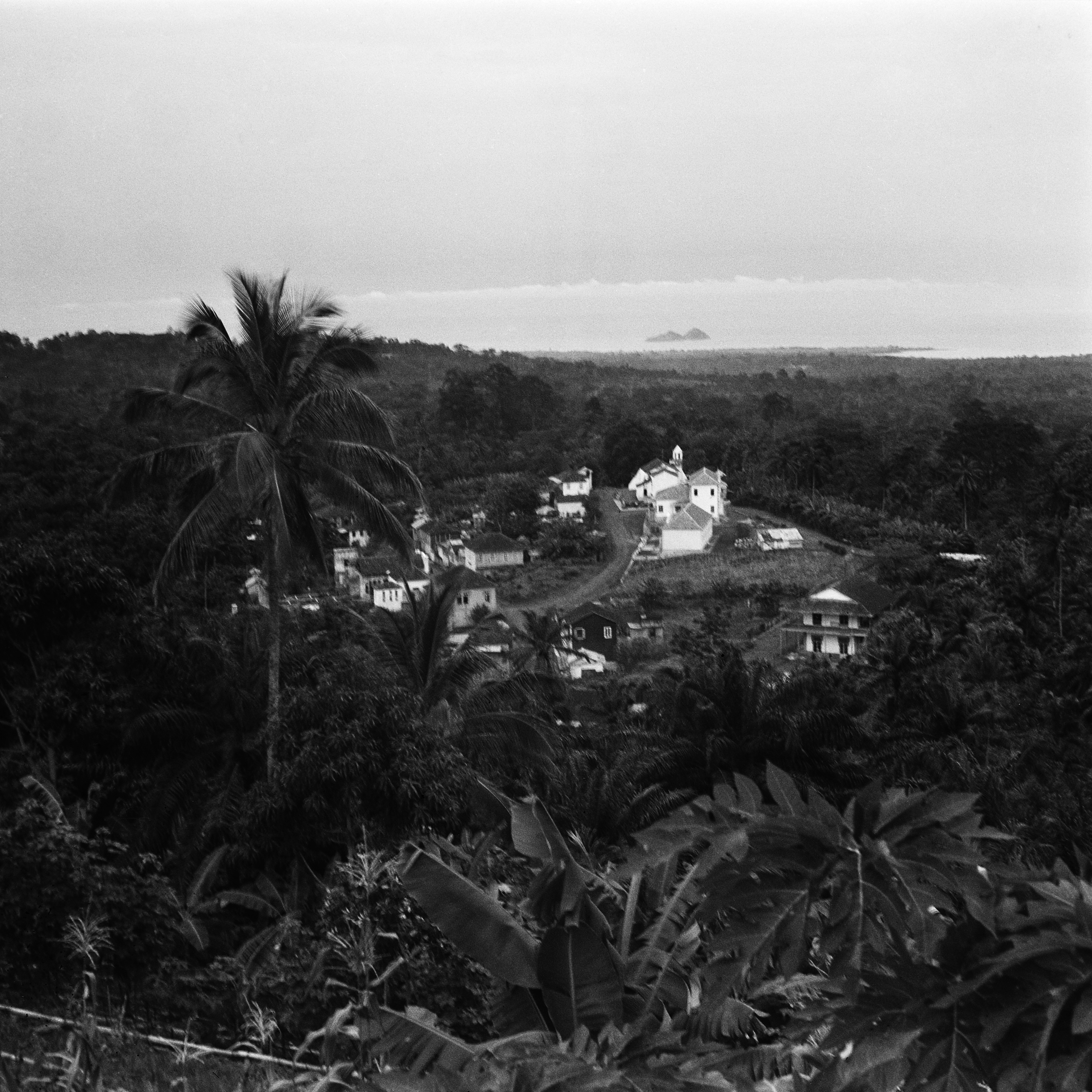
Vila Trindade 1941–1942

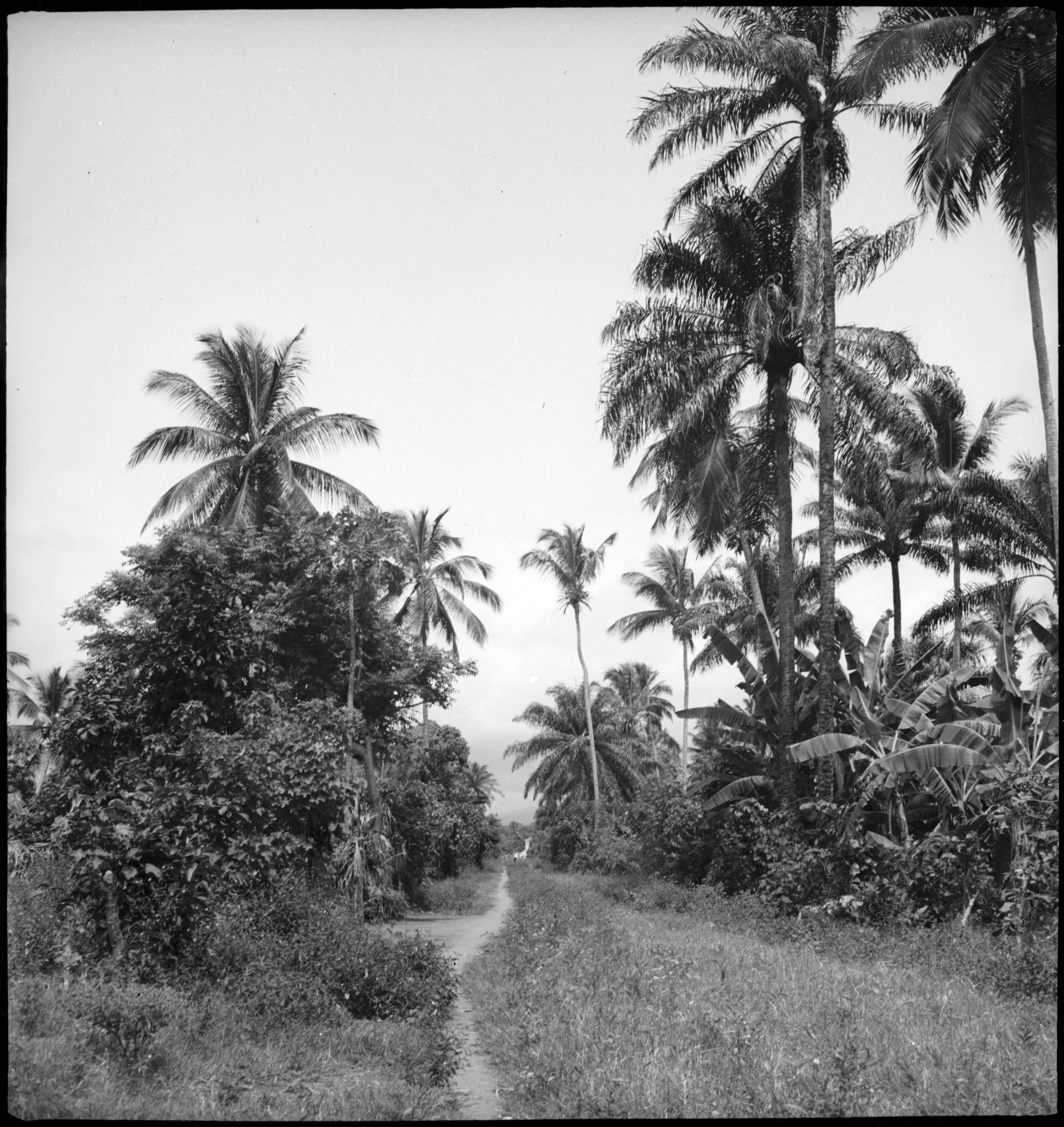
São Tomé landscape

=== Colonial architecture ===
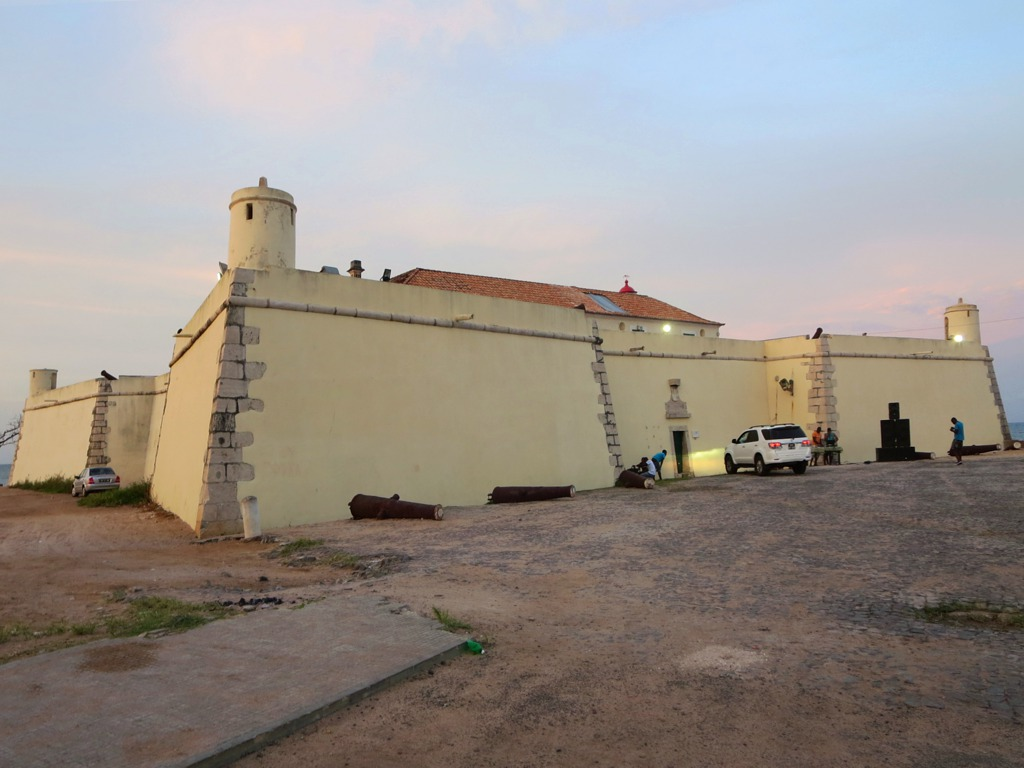
Fort São Sebastião.

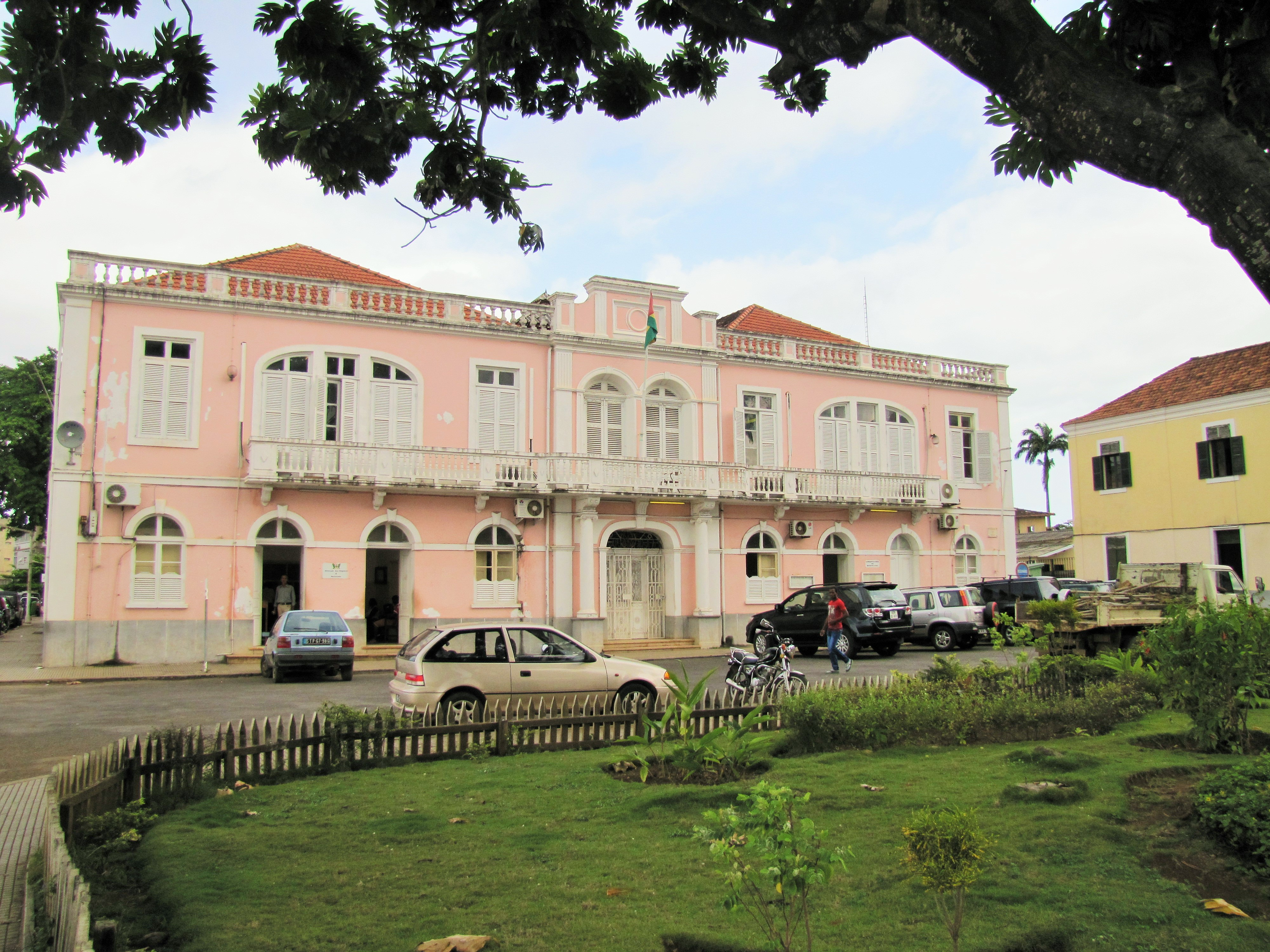
Supreme Court of São Tomé.

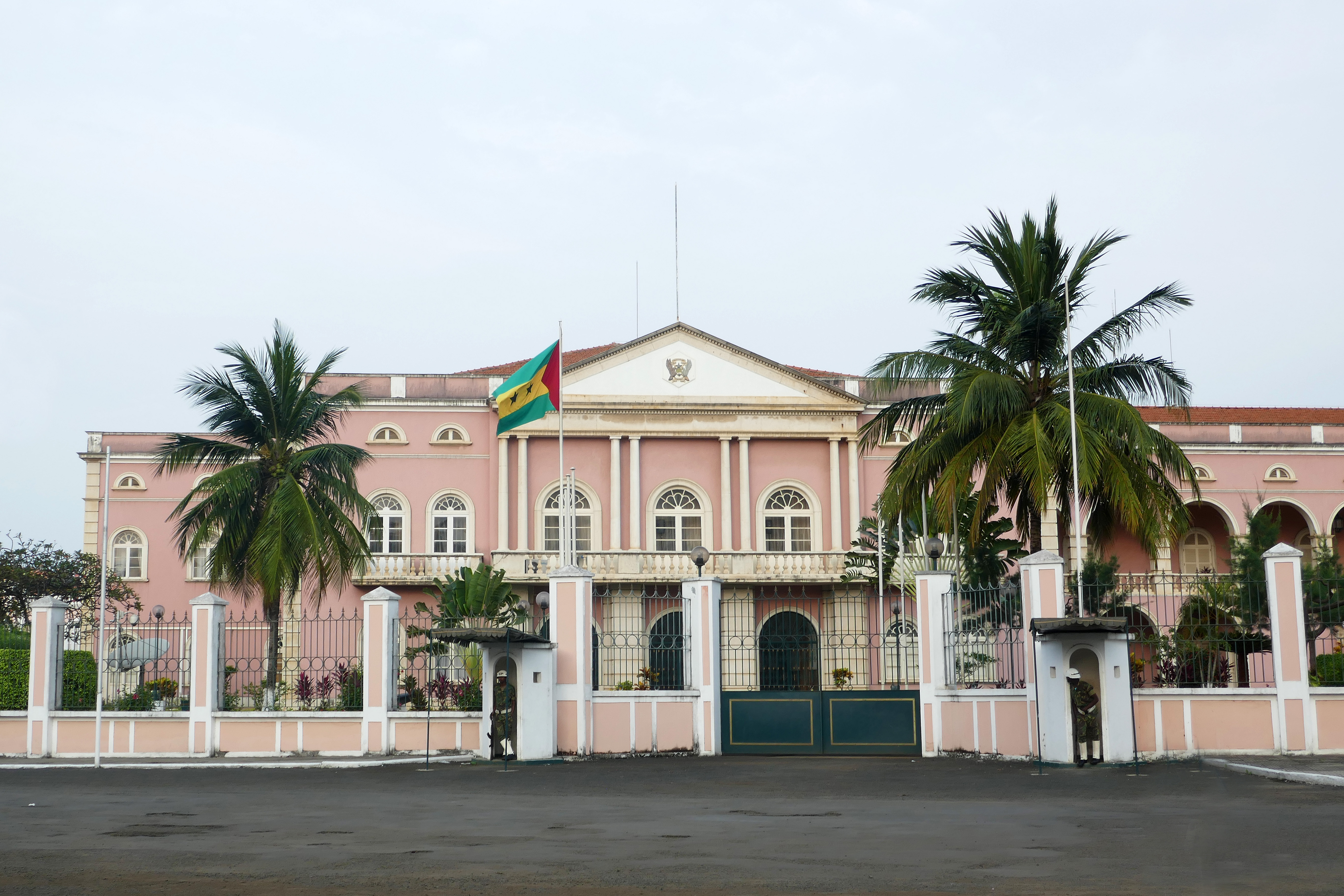
Presidential Palace.

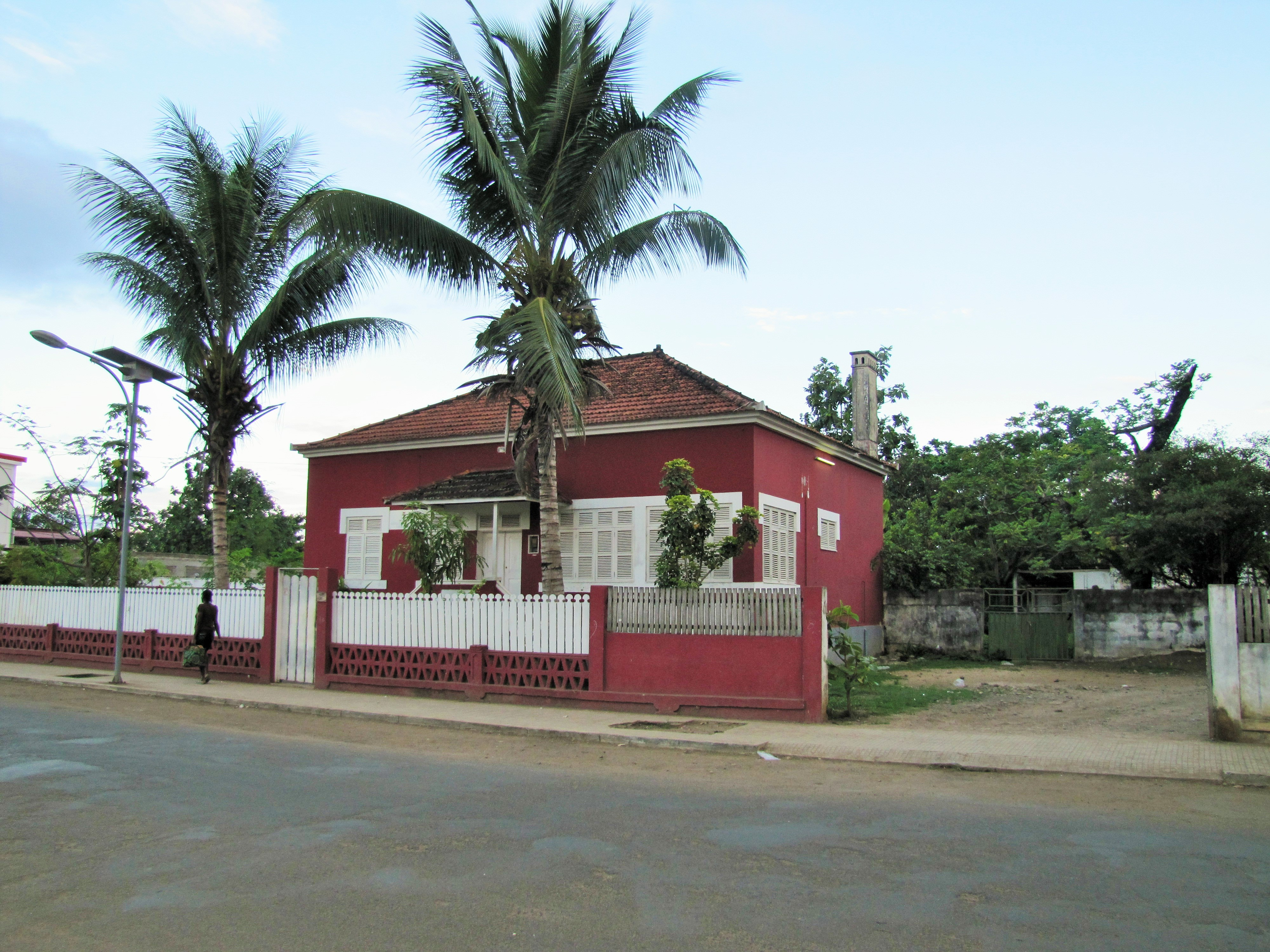
Residential home.

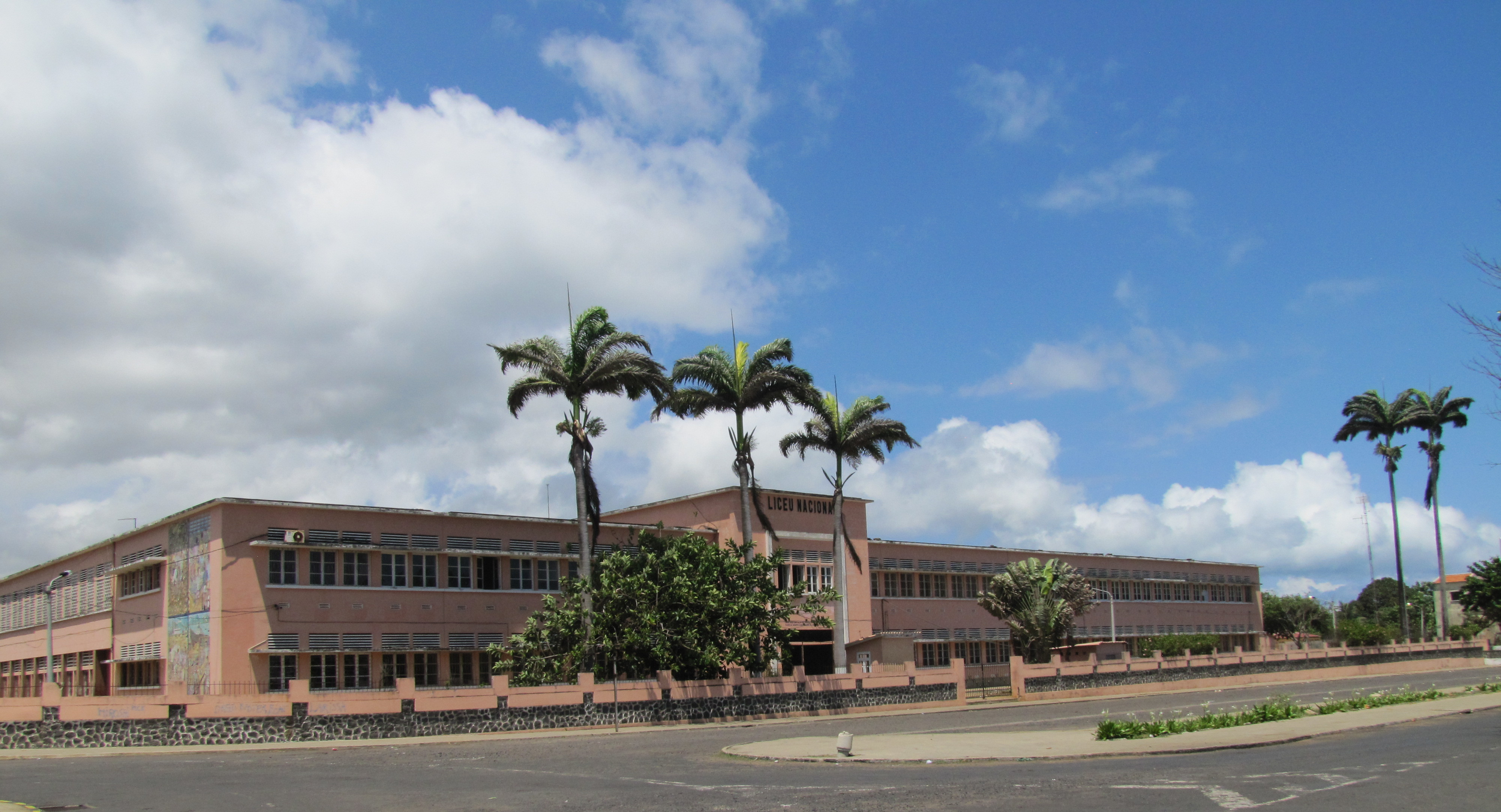
Highschool.

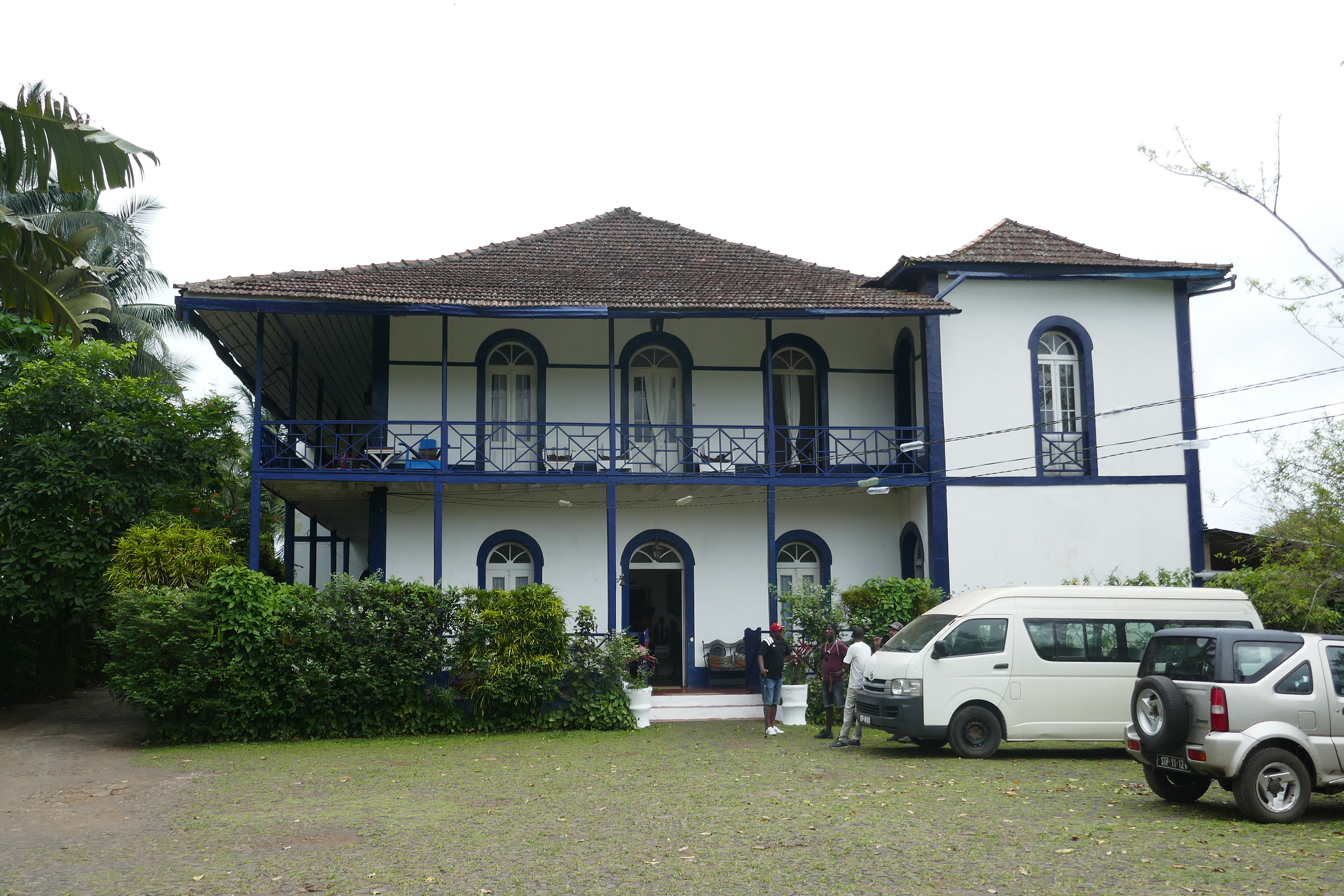
Plantation house of São João dos Angolares

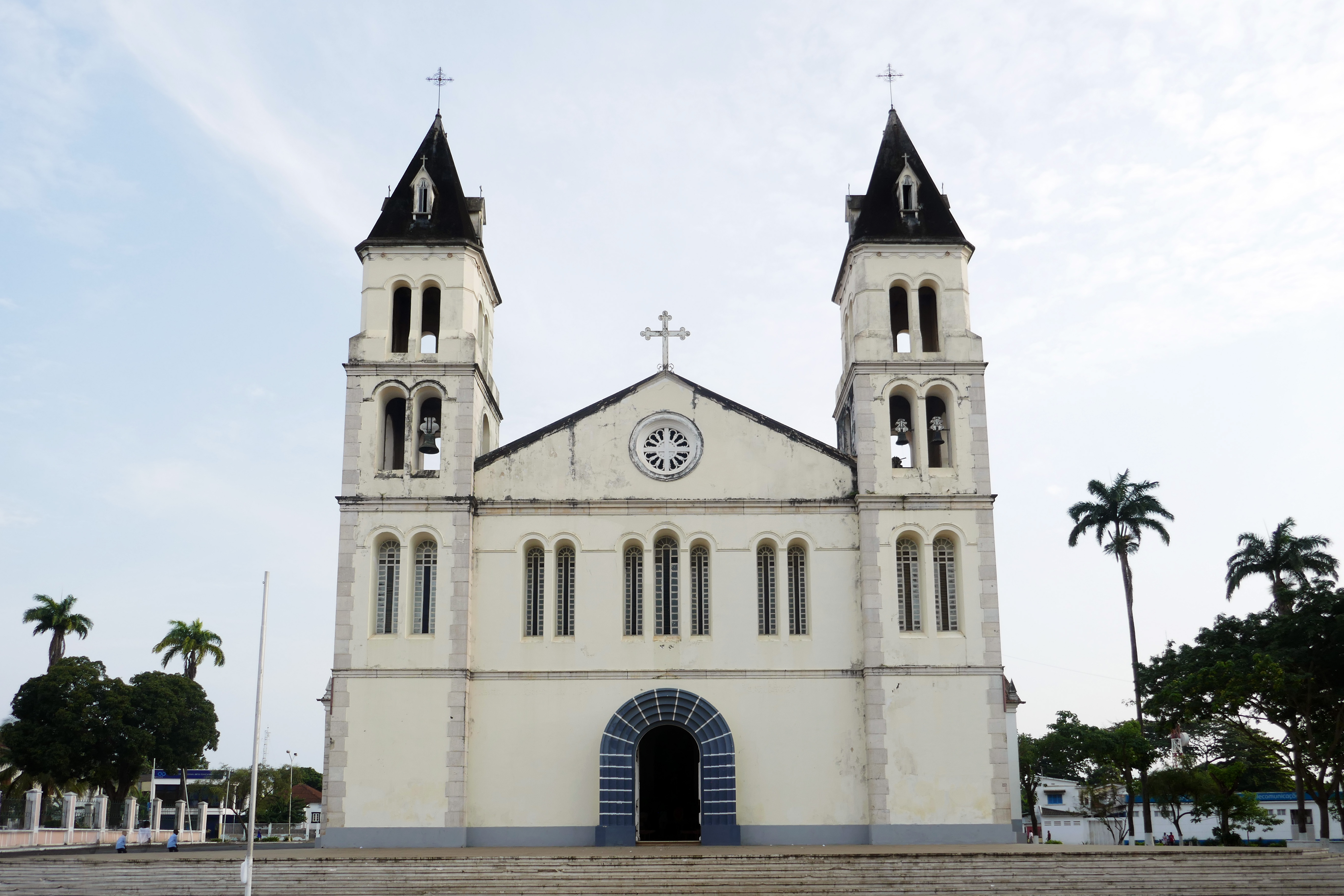
Cathedral of São Tomé

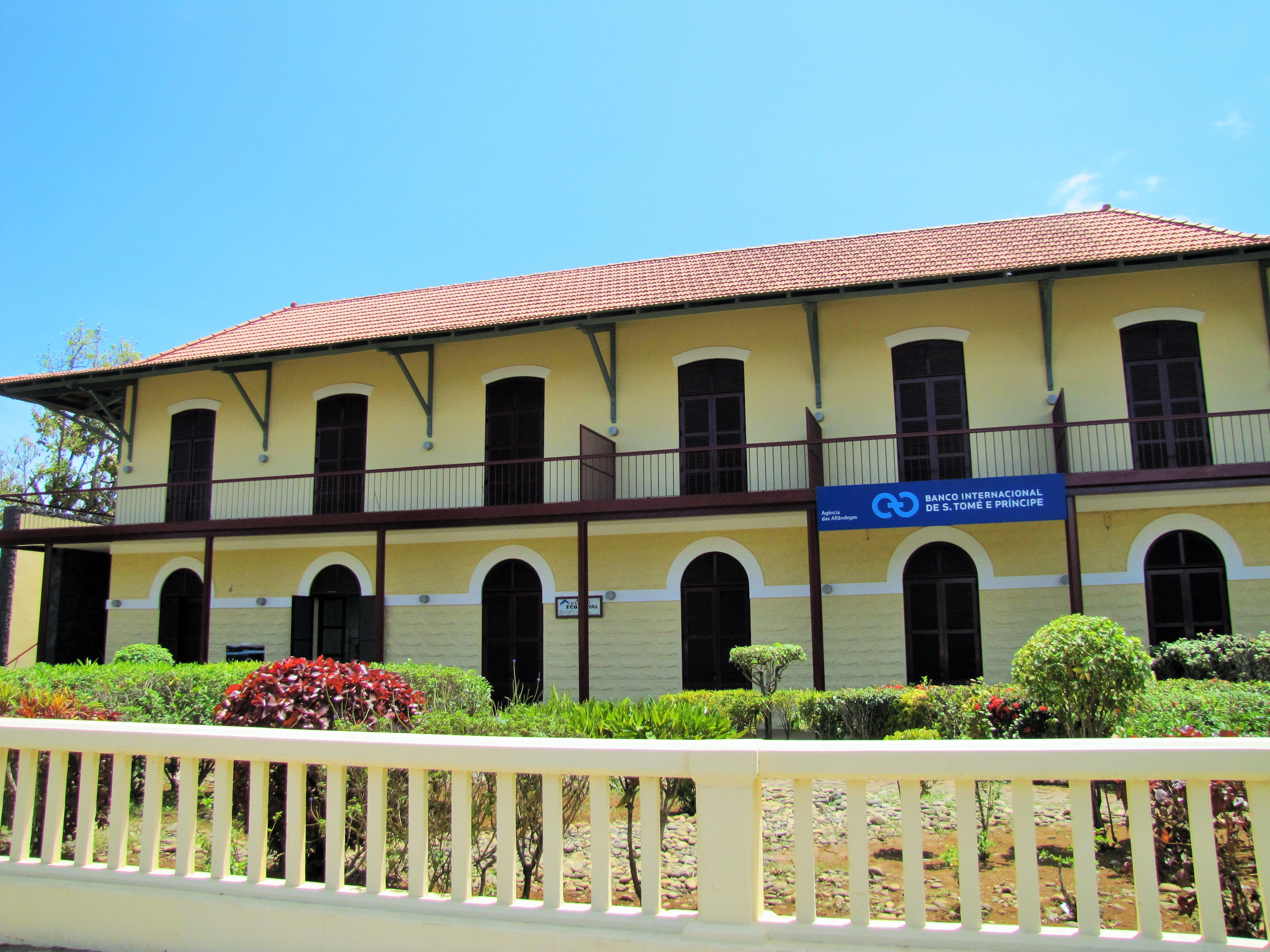
Former Misericórdia

=== Currency ===
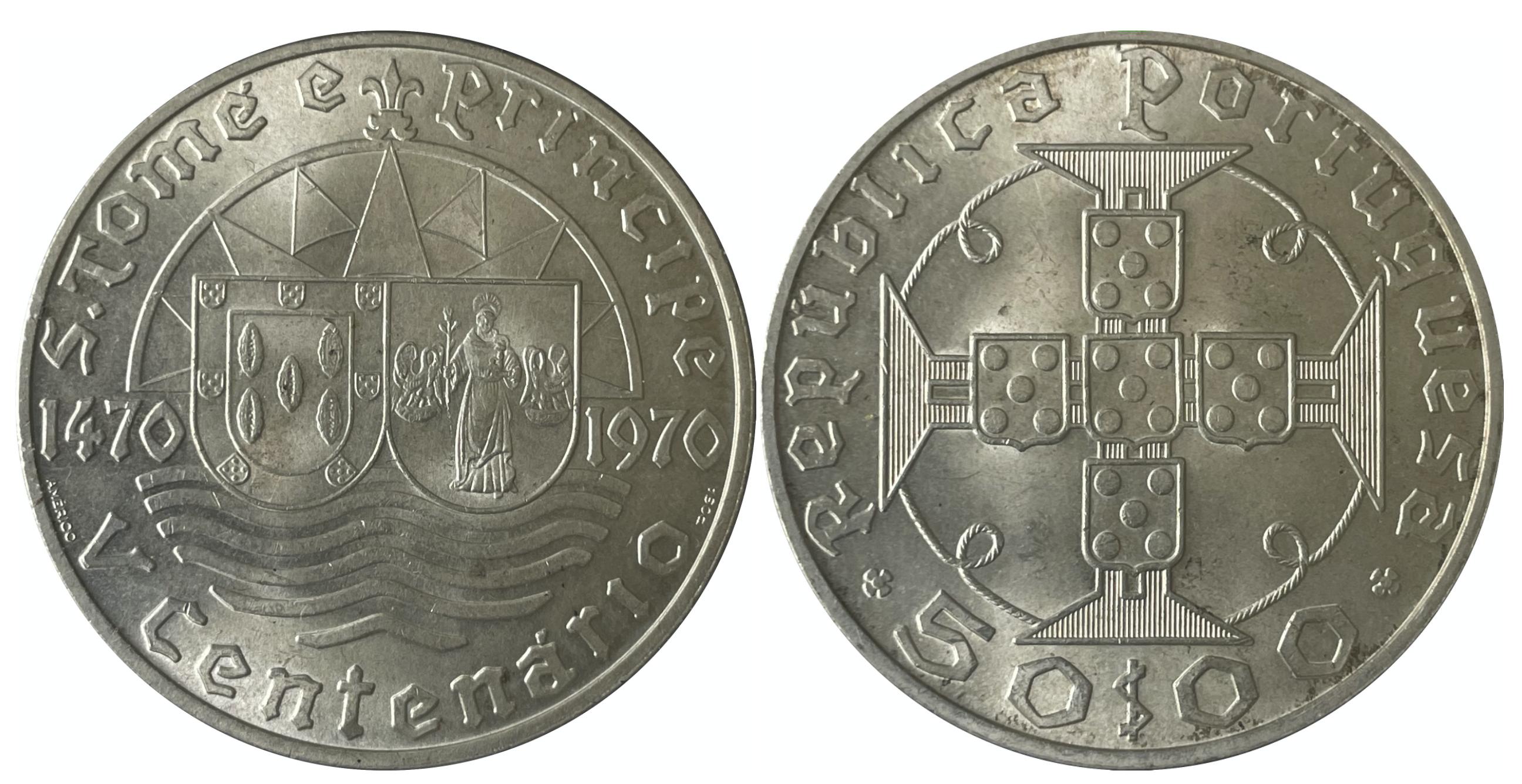
1970 coin of 50 escudos from São Tomé.

=== Proposed flags ===
Proposed flag for Portuguese São Tomé and Príncipe (1932)

Proposed flag for Portuguese São Tomé and Príncipe (1965)

== See also ==
- History of São Tomé and Príncipe
- Arquivo Histórico Ultramarino (archives in Lisbon documenting Portuguese Empire, including São Tomé and Príncipe)
