= List of banks in Macau =

This is a list of banks in the Macau Special Administrative Region of the People's Republic of China. According to the Monetary Authority of Macao, there are 27 licensed banks in Macau, 4 of which are headquartered in Macau.

== Note-issuing banks ==
- Banco Nacional Ultramarino, S.A. - Banco Nacional Ultramarino, S.A.
- Banco da China

== Licensed banks ==
=== Incorporated in Macau ===
As of May 2, 2025, there are 12 licensed banks registered in Macau.

Banks incorporated in Macau
No	Bank name	Chinese name	Established	SWIFT-BIC
1	Banco Tai Fung	大豐銀行	1942	TFBLMOMXXXX
2	Banco OCBC (Macau)	華僑銀行（澳門）	1995	WIHBMOMXXXX
3	Banco Delta Ásia	滙業銀行	1931	DABGMOMXXXX
4	Banco Industrial e Comercial da China (Macau)	中國工商銀行（澳門）	2009	ICBKMOMXXXX
5	Banco Luso Internacional	澳門國際銀行	1999	LUSOMOMXXXX
6	Banco Comercial de Macau	澳門商業銀行	1959	CMACMOMXXXX
7	Banco Chinês de Macau	澳門華人銀行	1993	
8	Banco Well Link	立橋銀行	2008	BESCMOMXXXX
9	Banco Nacional Ultramarino	大西洋銀行	1902	BNULMOMXXXX
10	Banco de Desenvolvimento de Macau	澳門發展銀行	2001	
11	Banco da China (Macau)	中國銀行（澳門）	2022	BKCHMOMXXXX
12	Banco de Formiga (Macau)	螞蟻銀行（澳門）	2019	

=== Incorporated outside Macau ===
As of June 30, 2025, there are 19 licensed banks registered outside Macau.

Foreign-licensed bank branches in Macau
No	Headquarters	Bank name	Chinese name	Established	SWIFT-BIC
1	Hong Kong	The Hongkong & Shanghai Banking Corporation	香港上海滙豐銀行	1972	HSBCMOMXXXX
2	Hong Kong	DBS Bank (Hong Kong)	星展銀行（香港）	1973	DBSSMOMXXXX
3	China	Banco da China	中國銀行	1950	BKCHMOMXCUS
4	United Kingdom	Standard Chartered Bank	渣打銀行	1983	SCBLMOMXXXX
5	China	Banco de Guangfa da China	廣發銀行	1993	GDBKMOMXXXX
6	Taiwan	Bank SinoPac	永豐商業銀行	1997	SINOMOMXXXX
7	Hong Kong	Chong Hing Bank	創興銀行	1997	LCHBMOMXXXX
8	Hong Kong	Banco da East Asia	東亞銀行	2001	BEAMOMXXXX
9	Hong Kong	Hang Seng Bank	恒生銀行	2003	HASEMOMXXXX
10	Hong Kong	Banco CITIC Internacional (China)	中信銀行（國際）	2005	KWHKMOMX
11	China	Bank of Communication	交通銀行	2007	COMMMOMXXXX
12	Portugal	Banco Comercial Português	葡萄牙商業銀行	1993	BCOMMOMXXXX
13	Taiwan	Banco Comercial Primeiro	第一商業銀行	2010	FCBKMOMX
14	Hong Kong	Banco CMB Wing Lung	招商永隆銀行	2010	CMBMMOMXXXX
15	Taiwan	Banco Comercial Hua Nan	華南商業銀行	2012	HNBMMOMXXXX
16	China	Banco de Construção da China	中國建設銀行	2014	PCBMMOMXXXX
17	China	Banco Agrícola da China	中國農業銀行	2018	ABCMMOMXXXX
18	China	Banco Industrial e Comercial da China	中國工商銀行	2020	ICBKMOMMXXX
19	China	Banco de Everbright da China	中國光大銀行	2023	CEBMMOMXXXX

=== Asset size ===
Certain Asia Bank are not included in this ranking due to the lack of standalone financial disclosures or the absence of publicly accessible information. This includes: Banco Delta Ásia.

Licensed banks in Macau ranked by consolidated total assets (2025)
Rank	Bank Name	Total Asset (MOP million)	Consolidated Total Asset (MOP million)
1	Bank of China (Macau) (Note: Bank of China (Macau) Limited commenced operations on 20 November 2022.)	246,234.01	992,610.75 (Note: 報告的數字是基於本地銀行和在同一控股集團下運營的海外銀行澳門分行的合併估計，僅用於指示性比較目的。)
1	Bank of China Macau Branch	746,376.74	992,610.75
2	Industrial and Commercial Bank of China (Macau)	387,243.09	482,916.64 (Note: 報告的數字是基於本地銀行和在同一控股集團下運營的海外銀行澳門分行的合併估計，僅用於指示性比較目的。)
2	Industrial and Commercial Bank of China Macau Branch	95,673.55	482,916.64
3	LUSO International Banking	208,091.67	
4	Tai Fung Bank	187,976.47	
5	China Construction Bank Macau Branch	133,308.51	
6	Bank of Communications Macau Branch	120,528.94	
7	Agricultural Bank of China Macau Branch	109,302.21	
8	China Guangfa Bank Macau Branch	69,371.25	
9	Banco Nacional Ultramarino	57,934.97	
10	Well Link Bank	38,912.57	
11	OCBC Bank (Macau)	36,724.54	
12	HSBC Bank Macau Branch	21,980.11	31,151.31 (Note: 報告的數字是基於在同一控股集團下運營的海外銀行澳門分行的合併估計，僅用於指示性比較目的。)
12	Hang Seng Bank Macau Branch	9,171.20	31,151.31
13	CMB Wing Lung Bank Macau Branch	27,537.17	
14	Banco Comercial de Macau	23,437.84	
15	Macau Development Bank	15,670.19	
16	China Everbright Bank Macau Branch	15,001.74	
17	Macau Chinese Bank	10,035.20	
18	Ant Bank (Macau)	7,218.84	
19	Bank SinoPac Macau Branch	7,159.24	
20	DBS Bank Macau Branch	6,988.46	
21	Chong Hing Bank Macau Branch	6,819.93	
22	Bank of East Asia Macau Branch	6,325.09	
23	Millennium bcp Macau Branch	5,552.03	
24	China CITIC Bank International Macau Branch	4,530.07	
25	Standard Chartered Bank Macau Branch	3,790.73	
26	First Commercial Bank Macau Branch	2,321.45	
27	Hua Nan Bank Macau Branch	1,464.33	

== Defunct banks ==
- (France) BNP Paribas: Established a representative office in 1979, opened a branch in 1983, and closed in 2011.
- (Brazil) Banco do Brasil: Established a representative office in 1979, and closed in 1987.
- (Portugal) Banco Português do Atlântico: Opened a branch in 1981, and closed in 1997.
- (Portugal) Banco Fonsecas & Burnay: Opened a branch in 1983, and closed in 1992.
- (Portugal) Banco Pinto & Sotto Mayor: Opened a branch in 1983, and closed in 1993.
- Banco Santander Portugal (formerly Banco Totta Ásia): Originally opened as Banco Totta dos Açores in 1983; closed in 2003.
- (France) Crédit Agricole CIB: Opened a branch in 1983, and closed in 1995.
- (Cayman Islands) Bank of Credit and Commerce International: Opened a branch in 1983, and its license was revoked in 1992.
- (Germany) Deutsche Bank (formerly Eurasia Bank): Opened a branch in 1983; closed in 2000.
- (Portugal) Banco Português de Investimento (BPI): Established a representative office in 2005; closed in 2018.
- (Portugal) Caixa Geral de Depósitos: Established a representative office in 2013; closed in 2018.
- (United States) Citibank: Citibank Macau Branch ceased operations on 30 June 2025.

== See also ==
- List of insurance companies in Macau
- List of banks in China
- List of banks in Hong Kong
