= Lisbon (disambiguation) =

Lisbon is the capital city of Portugal.

Lisbon may also refer to:

== Places ==
=== Portugal ===
- Lisbon District, a district along the western coast

=== United States ===
- Lisbon, Connecticut, a New England town
- Lisbon, Florida
- Lisbon, Illinois
- Lisbon, Indiana
- Lisbon, Iowa
- Lisbon, Louisiana
- Lisbon, Maine, a New England town
  - Lisbon (CDP), Maine, within the town
- Lisbon, Maryland
- Lisbon, Missouri
- Lisbon, New Hampshire, a New England town
  - Lisbon (CDP), New Hampshire, within the town
- Lisbon, New York
- Lisbon, North Dakota
- Lisbon, Clark County, Ohio
- Lisbon, Ohio (Columbiana County)
- Lisbon, Juneau County, Wisconsin, a town
- Lisbon, Waukesha County, Wisconsin, a town
- Lisbon Township (disambiguation)
- New Lisbon (disambiguation)

== Other uses ==
- Lisbon (The Walkmen album), 2010
- Lisbon (Keith Fullerton Whitman album), 2006
- Lisbon (1956 film), a film by Ray Milland
- Lisbon (1999 film), an Argentine-Spanish thriller
- Grand Lisboa, a hotel in Macau, China
- "Lisbon Antigua", the title song from the film Lisbon
- Lisbon Treaty, signed by the EU member states on 13 December 2007, and entered into force on 1 December 2009
- Lisbon Strategy, a central element of the European Union's economic strategy
- Lisbon Convention, an international convention of the Council of Europe elaborated together with UNESCO
- Lisbon Declaration, a treaty signed between countries of the European Union and the African Union
- Lisbon Lions, Celtic FC squad of 1967
- Teresa Lisbon, a fictional character on the American TV crime drama The Mentalist
- Treaty of Lisbon, a treaty of the European Union
- Lisbon, the first movement of Lincolnshire Posy
- "Lisbon", an episode of the television series The Crown
- Bank of Lisbon, a defunct South African bank

== See also ==
- Lisburn
