= Generators (album) =

Live album by Keith Fullerton Whitman
- Released: February 28, 2012
- Recorded: September 26–27, 2010
- Venues: Theatre Project (Baltimore, Maryland); ISSUE Project Room (Brooklyn, New York)
- Genre: Electronic
- Length: 35:08
- Label: Editions Mego

Keith Fullerton Whitman chronology
Generator (2011)	Generators (2012)	Occlusions (2012)

Generators is a live album by American musician Keith Fullerton Whitman. It was released on February 28, 2012, through Editions Mego.

== Background ==
Keith Fullerton Whitman, also known under the pseudonym Hrvatski, is an American musician. Generators stems from a composition called "Generator". Since its 2009 premiere, Whitman performed the piece in different variations over the next couple of years. Generators contains two live performances of the piece: "Issue Generator (for Eliane Radigue)" and "High Zero Generator". The album was recorded on September 26, 2010, at Theatre Project in Baltimore, Maryland, as part of the High Zero festival; and on September 27, 2010, at ISSUE Project Room in Brooklyn, New York, during the "For Eliane" night of the Propensity of Sound festival dedicated to Éliane Radigue's work.

The album was originally scheduled to be released on February 21, 2012. It was eventually released on February 28, 2012, through Editions Mego.

== Critical reception ==
Professional ratings
Review scores
Source	Rating
Beats Per Minute	72%
Pitchfork	7.5/10
Spin	7/10

Daniel Sylvester of Exclaim! wrote, "Despite all of the calculations and conceptions that went into Generators, the two tracks manage to come off as impulsive and exciting." Josh Becker of Beats Per Minute noted that "Whitman cares a lot about the way we perceive sound, noise, music, and all decaying digital permutations thereof." He added, "With this release, the difference is that you get the pleasure of hearing both the artist himself at work as well as a preexisting audience already perceiving his noise." Mark Richardson of Pitchfork stated, "Together, the "Generator" pieces form a terrifically engaging contrast, a fascinating 35 minutes of electronic music that, while drawing heavily from the past, also sounds like nothing else out there now."

Fact placed "Issue Generator (for Eliane Radigue)" at number 87 on its list of "The 100 Best Tracks of 2012".

== Track listing ==
Generators track listing
No.	Title	Length
1.	"Issue Generator (for Eliane Radigue)"	17:34
2.	"High Zero Generator"	17:34
Total length:		35:08

== Personnel ==
Credits adapted from liner notes.

- Keith Fullerton Whitman
- Graham Lambkin – artwork
