= Lisbon Falls =

Lisbon Falls, Maine is a CDP in the town of Lisbon, Maine, United States of America.

Lisbon Falls may also refer to:

- Lisbon Falls (waterfall), a waterfall in Mpumalanga, South Africa
- Lisbon Falls High School, in Lisbon, Maine

== See also ==
- Lisbon (disambiguation)
