= Israel–South Africa agreement =

1975 secret agreement between Israel and South Africa

Israel-South Africa agreement
Security and Secrecy Agreement
- Type: Military alliance
- Signed: April 3, 1975
- Location: Zurich, Switzerland
- Signatories: Shimon Peres, Minister of Defense; P.W. Botha, Minister of Defence
- Parties: Israel; South Africa
- Depositary: Switzerland
- Language: English

The Israel–South Africa agreement (ISSA) was a secret defense co-operation agreement signed in 1975 between Israel and the Apartheid government of South Africa. The agreement outlined the two nations’ cooperation on nuclear issues. It was signed by South African Prime Minister P.W. Botha and Israeli Prime Minister Shimon Peres.

The agreement covered many different areas of defense co-operation at a time when both countries were unable to source weapons and defense technology freely on the international market, primarily because of arms embargoes in place at the time, in South Africa's case due to apartheid. A spokesperson for Peres denied the documents, asserting that there were "never any negotiations" between the two regimes.

== ISSA Meetings ==
At least three meetings related to the treaty were held, referred to in documents as Issa meetings. The first meeting on the 3rd of April 1975 involved the signing of the treaty by then Minister Of Defense Shimon Peres of Israel and President P.W. Botha of South Africa. The treaty stated that, "The very existence of this Agreement as well as any other agreement relating to the activities defined in Clause 2 hereof, including information about the terms or contents of any such agreement, shall be secret and shall not be disclosed by either party, except as hereinafter provided."

The second meeting was held on the 1st of July inside of the Bank of Lisbon in South Africa. Articles of discussion included the establishment of a South African Navy team in Israel, financial agreements, evaluation of an Israeli tank's Performance by South African Defence Force technicians, delivery of 200 Continental AV1790 engines, issuing of Diplomatic Passports, as well as South African dealings with IAI and IMI.

The third meeting was held on the 30th of June at the Government Guest House in Pretoria. South African interest in acquiring Night-vision technology and an unspecified "New Tank" was discussed, possibly the Centurion. Projects by the codewords "BlueBat" and "Olive" were also discussed.

== See also ==
- Israel–South Africa relations
- United Nations Security Council Resolution 418
- South Africa and weapons of mass destruction
