= KFW =

KFW may refer to:

- Keith Fullerton Whitman (born 1973), an American musician
- KfW or Kreditanstalt für Wiederaufbau, a German public-sector financial institution
