= Multiple =

Multiple may refer to:

== Economics ==
- Multiple finance, a method used to analyze stock prices
- Multiples of the price-to-earnings ratio
- Chain stores, are also referred to as 'Multiples'
- Box office multiple, the ratio of a film's total gross to that of its opening weekend

== Sociology ==
- Multiples (sociology), a theory in sociology of science by Robert K. Merton, see

== Science ==
- Multiple (mathematics), multiples of numbers
- List of multiple discoveries, instances of scientists, working independently of each other, reaching similar findings
- Multiple birth, because having twins is sometimes called having "multiples"
- Multiple sclerosis, an inflammatory disease
- Parlance for people with multiple identities, sometimes called "multiples"; often theorized as having dissociative identity disorder
- Multiple myeloma (MM), a cancer that forms in a type of white blood cell (WBC) called plasma cells.

== Printing ==
- Printmaking, where multiple is often used as a term for a print, especially in the US
- Artist's multiple, series of identical prints, collages or objects by an artist, subverting the idea of the original

== Fiction ==
- Multiple Man, a mutant superhero in the Marvel Comics universe

== Music ==
- Multiples (album), a 2005 music album by Keith Fullerton Whitman
- Multiple (album), a 1973 album by American saxophonist Joe Henderson

== Other ==
- Multiple Bets, types of bet in the UK, involving two or more selections

== See also ==
- Multiplicity (disambiguation)
