= Bank of Lisbon =

Defunct South African bank

Bank of Lisbon, later Bank of Lisbon International, was a South African bank established by the Portuguese community. In 1995, it merged with the Mercantile Bank. Its historical building was torn down in 2019.

== History ==
The bank was established in 1965 by three Portuguese banks: Banco Nacional Ultramarino (now part of Caixa Geral de Depósitos), Banco Português do Atlântico (now part of Millennium BCP and Banco de Angola (at the time when Angola was under Portuguese rule, holding 30% each of the shares, as well as a 10% interest from General Mining and Finance Corporation. In 1986, Américo Amorim started holding shares. By 1989, the bank had 28 branches in South Africa. In 1995, the bank merged with the Mercantile Bank.

== Headquarters ==
The bank's longtime headquarters in Johannesburg were begun construction built in 1967 and was completed in 1970. It was designed by Gluckman, De Beer, Margoles and Partners. It had 26 floors above the ground and four basement parking levels.

A fire damaged the building in September 2018. On 24 November 2019, it was demolished as consequence of the fire, with approval from the provincial government of Gauteng. By May 2022, its former site was surrounded by a fence, but was now being used as a dumping site.
