= Mercantile Bank (South Africa) =

Commercial bank in South Africa

Mercantile Bank Limited
- Type: Subsidiary
- Industry: Banking
- Founded: 1965
- Headquarters: Sandown (Sandton), South Africa
- Products: Retail banking Corporate finance Asset Management; Capital Markets
- Owner: Capitec Bank
- Number of employees: 501-1000
- Parent: Mercantile Bank Holdings Limited
- Website: www.capitecbank.co.za

Mercantile Bank Limited is a South African commercial bank, founded in 1965. It was previously called Bank of Lisbon International. The bank is headquartered in Sandton, South Africa, and provides products and services in retail banking, corporate finance, asset management, equity brokerage and security.

It is a fully owned subsidiary of Mercantile Bank Holdings Limited, which in turn is owned by the holding company registered in Portugal – Caixa Geral de Depósitos S.A. In 2019, Capitec Bank bought Mercantile Bank South Africa.

In October 2019, the South African Minister of Finance and other Regulatory Authorities formally approved Capitec's purchase and acquisition of Mercantile Business Bank. As of November 2019, Capitec Bank bought all the shares of Mercantile Bank Ltd from CGD and serves as its business banking branch.

It has more than 15 branches in South Africa, and employs between 501 and 1000 employees.

== History ==
The bank was founded in Republic of South Africa in 1965. It obtained a banking licence in 1989; and became a fully owned subsidiary of Mercantile Bank Holdings Limited, a bank holding company incorporated in January the same year.

In 1995, the bank merged with Bank of Lisbon International (BLI) – a bank established in 1965. Shortly thereafter in 1996, the bank holding company name was changed from 'Mercantile Bank Holdings Limited' to 'Mercantile Lisbon Bank Holdings Limited' (MLBH). Earlier in 1995, the Portugal state-owned bank – Caixa Geral de Depósitos (CGD) had acquired a 27% stake in MLBH through its subsidiary Banco Nacional Ultramarino (presently the Macau based Banco Nacional Ultramarino SA).

In August 1998, Mercantile Lisbon Bank Holdings (MLBH) was listed on the Johannesburg Securities Exchange South Africa (now JSE Ltd). In March 2002, CSD stake in MLBH increased to 64.8%, and by September 2004 to 91.75%.

In 2005, the name 'MLBH' was changed back to Mercantile Bank Holdings Limited.

In 2012, it was delisted at 52 cents per share.

Mercantile Bank is a division of Capitec Bank Limited.

== See also ==
- List of banks in South Africa
- Banco Nacional Ultramarino
- Caixa Geral de Depósitos
