= Banco Internacional de São Tomé e Príncipe =

International bank of Sao Tome and Principe

Banco Internacional de São Tomé e Príncipe (BISTP) is the largest and oldest commercial bank in São Tomé and Príncipe. It consists of a head office and 14 branches. Its name translates to International Bank of São Tomé and Príncipe.

== History ==
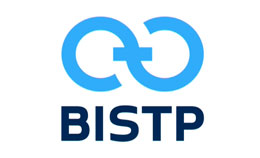
Intl. Bank of São Tomé e Príncipe logo

The bank was formed when the government converted National Bank of São Tomé and Príncipe from a combined central, development, and commercial bank into a pure central bank, Central Bank of São Tomé and Príncipe, on March 3, 1993. The government joined with two Portuguese banks, Banco Nacional Ultramarino and Banco Totta e Açores, to establish BISTP. The government owned 42%, and the two banks shared 52%. (The government had created National Bank of São Tomé and Príncipe in 1975 out of the branch of Banco Nacional Ultramarino. The bank, therefore, in a sense can trace its history back to Banco Nacional Utlramarino's entry in 1868.) The Portuguese bank, Caixa Geral de Depósitos, which had acquired Banco Nacional Ultramarino in 1988, merged with it fully in 2001. In 2000, Banco Santander acquired Banco Totta e Açores and disposed of its interest in BISTP to Caixa Geral de Depósitos, which now owns 52% of BISTP. It became an entirely a private company in 2003. In 2007, it had three branches, the number expanded to 14 in 2014 in two islands.

In 2009, it had announced that the banking services started to offer online under the name BISTP KWA Non.

== See also ==
- List of companies of São Tomé and Príncipe
