= Bank of China (Macau) =

Bank in Macau

- Logo of Bank of China

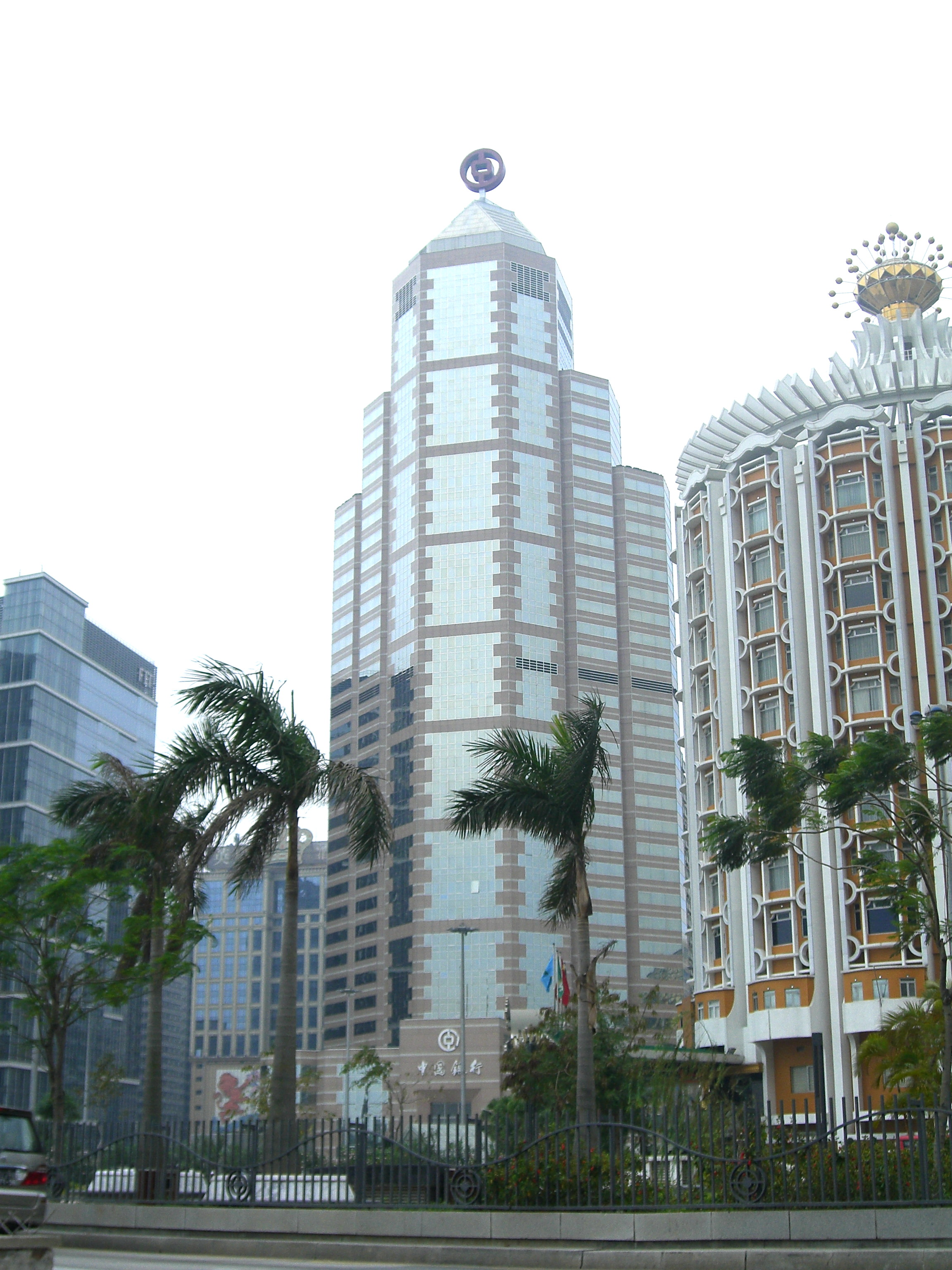
- Bank of China Building in Sé Parish, Macau
- Native name: 中國銀行（澳門）
- Type: Subsidiary
- Industry: Financial services
- Founded: 1950
- Founder: Bank of China
- Headquarters: Sé, Macau, Macau
- Area served: Macau
- Key people: Fan Yaosheng (General Manager / President)
- Services: Retail banking, corporate banking, investment banking, wealth management
- Total assets: MOP 664.1 billion (Bank)
- Number of employees: 1800+
- Parent: Bank of China
- Website: www.bankofchina.com/mo/

Bank of China (Macau) (Chinese: 中國銀行 (澳門)) is the largest commercial bank in the Macau Special Administrative Region of China. Operating as a wholly owned branch of the state-owned Bank of China, it serves as one of Macau’s two official currency-issuing banks alongside Banco Nacional Ultramarino. Established in 1950, the bank offers a full range of retail, corporate, investment, and cross-border financial services.

== History ==
Bank of China began operating in Macau in 1950 as Macau Namtong Bank, initially as a representative office to support financial transactions for Chinese communities and local enterprises.

In 1987, it was officially renamed as Bank of China Macau Branch.

In 1995, it was officially designated by the People's Bank of China as one of the two currency-issuing banks in Macau, alongside Banco Nacional Ultramarino.

In 2004, Bank of China Macau Branch was designated as a renminbi clearing bank.

In 2022, Bank of China (Macau) Limited was launched as the subsidiary for cross-border financial services.

== Note-issuing authority ==
Bank of China (Macau), together with Banco Nacional Ultramarino (BNU), is one of the two officially designated note-issuing banks in the Macao Special Administrative Region. The right to issue currency was granted by the Government of Macau through the Monetary Authority of Macao (AMCM), and Bank of China (Macau) began issuing Macanese patacas (MOP) on 16 October 1995. Prior to that, BNU had been the sole note-issuing authority in Macao since the late 19th century.

Under the legal framework governing currency issuance in Macao, both BOC (Macau) and BNU sign periodic agreements with the AMCM, allowing them to issue banknotes in parallel. The latest extension of these agreements was signed in 2020, enabling the two banks to continue issuing legal tender in Macao at least until 15 October 2030. Banknotes issued by BOC (Macau) and BNU have equal legal tender status and circulate side by side, though they differ in design and security features.

Bank of China (Macau) issues banknotes in denominations of MOP 10, 20, 50, 100, 500, and 1,000. In addition to regular banknotes, it has issued multiple commemorative notes, such as the 2008 Beijing Olympics series, the 20th anniversary of Handover of Macau in 2019.

The banknotes are printed by Hong Kong Note Printing. They incorporate enhanced security features such as color shifting inks, watermarks, windowed security threads, microprinting, and complex background patterns.
