= Swarm & Dither =

Studio album by Hrvatski
- Released: October 14, 2002
- Length: 52:45
- Label: Planet Mu
- Producer: Keith Fullerton Whitman

Hrvatski chronology
| Oiseaux 96-98 (1999) | Swarm & Dither (2002) | Irrevocably Overdriven Break Freakout Megamix (2005) |

Swarm & Dither is a studio album by American musician Keith Fullerton Whitman under the pseudonym Hrvatski. It was released on October 14, 2002, through Planet Mu.

== Background ==
Keith Fullerton Whitman is an American musician from Somerville, Massachusetts. He attended Berklee College of Music. Under the pseudonym Hrvatski, he released Oiseaux 96-98 in 1999. Swarm & Dither was created between 1994 and 2002. It includes his version of the Rolling Stones' song "Paint It Black". The album was released on October 14, 2002, through Planet Mu. A vinyl edition of the album contains six tracks.

== Critical reception ==
Professional ratings
Review scores
| Source | Rating |
|---|---|
| AllMusic | 2.5/5 stars |
| Pitchfork | 8.5/10 |

Matt Eberhart of XLR8R wrote, "Melding Squarepusher and Kid606 into a delicate post-jungle card tower, this record (Whitman's first full-length since his debut three years ago) is well worth the wait." Jon Whitney of Brainwashed stated, "Maybe one of these days Hrvatski will do some sort of a conceptual album, but for now, this listen is rewarding enough." Marcus Scott of BBC commented that "Hrvatski gives his own twist to virtually every strand of contemporary electronic music, remarkably keeping it fairly cohesive" over the album's length.

=== Accolades ===
Year-end lists for Swarm & Dither
| Publication | List | Rank | Ref. |
|---|---|---|---|
| Pitchfork | Top 50 Albums of 2002 | 44 | |

== Track listing ==
All tracks are written by Keith Fullerton Whitman, except where noted.

Swarm & Dither track listing
| No. | Title | Writer(s) | Length |
|---|---|---|---|
| 1. | "Vatstep DSP" | | 5:59 |
| 2. | "Untitled Fields 1994" | | 0:16 |
| 3. | "Paint It Black" | Mick Jagger; Keith Richards | 4:46 |
| 4. | "2nd Zero Fidelity Mandible Investigation" | | 3:48 |
| 5. | "EWC3" | | 2:20 |
| 6. | "Re: When Was the Last Time You Were Violent?" | | 4:12 |
| 7. | "Marbles" | | 3:48 |
| 8. | "Echoes" | | 2:50 |
| 9. | "EWC4" | | 2:24 |
| 10. | "Gemini (Early)" | | 3:16 |
| 11. | "Anaesthetise Thineself" | | 3:52 |
| 12. | "Freie Zeit" | | 4:43 |
| 13. | "Carrot (Hrvatski's Nightvision)" | | 6:01 |
| 14. | "Tegenborg" | | 4:30 |
| Total length: | | | 52:45 |

Digital edition bonus track
| No. | Title | Length |
|---|---|---|
| 15. | "Gemini (Revision)" | 8:35 |

Expanded digital edition bonus tracks
| No. | Title | Length |
|---|---|---|
| 15. | "Insect Digestion Melancholy" | 5:27 |
| 16. | "Epoxy (Live)" | 4:30 |
| 17. | "Eruption 1970" | 5:18 |
| 18. | "Akimbo" | 4:00 |
| 19. | "Gank2" | 0:47 |
| 20. | "Lullaby" | 3:16 |
| 21. | "Glass" | 2:25 |
| 22. | "Gemini (Revision)" | 8:35 |
| 23. | "Tegenborg (No Guitar)" | 2:38 |
| 24. | "Insect Digestion Melancholy (from DAT)" | 6:55 |
| 25. | "Epoxy (Dead)" | 4:20 |
| 26. | "Akimbo (Rough)" | 4:00 |
| 27. | "Dark Jazz (Demo)" | 1:29 |

== Personnel ==
Credits adapted from liner notes.

- Keith Fullerton Whitman – production, photography
- Matthew Azevedo – mastering
- Ben Curzon – design
