= Playthroughs (album) =

- "Jellyfish" cover accompanying the Kranky digital download edition

Studio album by Keith Fullerton Whitman
- Released: October 21, 2002
- Genre: Ambient, minimal, drone
- Length: 49:39
- Label: Kranky
- Producer: Keith Fullerton Whitman

Keith Fullerton Whitman chronology
21:30 for Acoustic Guitar... (2001)	Playthroughs (2002)	Dartmouth Street Underpass (2003)

Professional ratings
Review scores
Source	Rating
AllMusic	4.5/5 stars
Pitchfork	9.7/10

Playthroughs is a studio album by American electronic musician Keith Fullerton Whitman, released on Kranky in 2002. It was recorded in analogue manner by using electric guitar and processing its sounds.

Pitchfork gave the album a high rating of 9.7/10. They placed it at number 36 on its list of the "Top 50 Albums of 2002" and at number 85 on its list of "The Top 100 Albums of 2000-04". Pitchfork also named "Playthroughs" 23rd best ambient album of all time in 2016.

== Track listing ==
No.	Title	Length
1.	"Track3a (2waynice)"	5:30
2.	"Feedback Zwei"	10:01
3.	"Fib01a"	8:01
4.	"SACGTR SVP"	9:05
5.	"Modena"	17:02
