= Macanese pataca =

Currency of Macau

澳門元 (Chinese) Pataca de Macau (Portuguese)
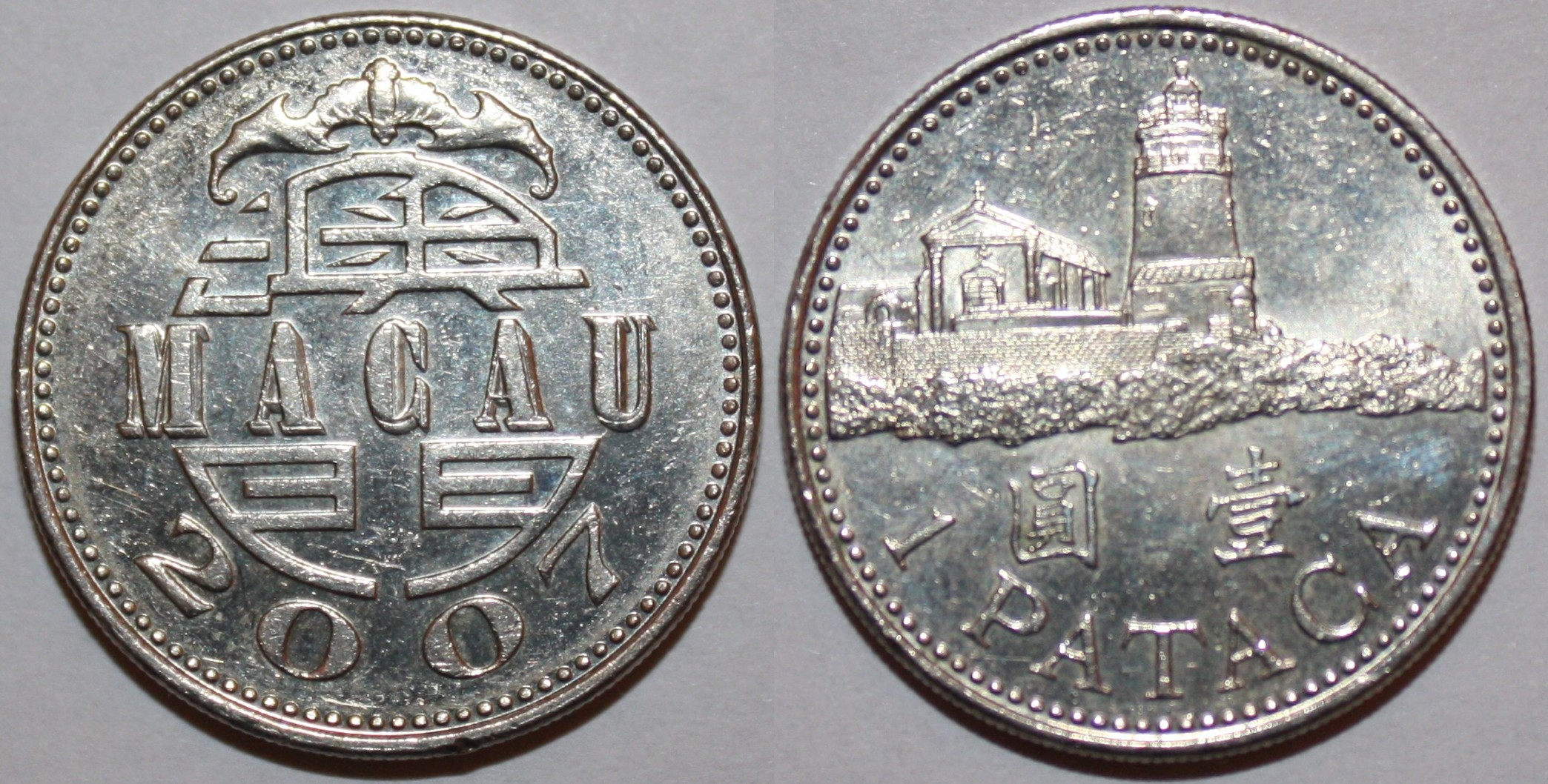
- 1 pataca coin 2007

ISO 4217
- Code: MOP (numeric: 446)
- Subunit: 0.01

Units of account
- Base unit: pataca
- Plural: patacas (Portuguese only)
- Symbol: $, MOP$ or 元
- Subunit
- 1/10: 毫 (Chinese) (ho) no corresponding Portuguese term for ten avos
- 1/100: 仙 (Chinese) (sin) avo (Portuguese) (no longer in circulation)

Denominations
- Banknotes
- Freq. used: $10, $20, $50, $100, $500
- Rarely used: $1,000
- Coins
- Freq. used: 10, 50 avos, $1, $5
- Rarely used: 20 avos, $2, $10 (still minted)

Demographics
- User(s): Macau (alongside Hong Kong dollar)

Issuance
- Monetary authority: Autoridade Monetária de Macau
- Website: www.amcm.gov.mo
- Printer: Issuing banks: Banco Nacional Ultramarino; Banco da China; Printer: Hong Kong Note Printing

Valuation
- Inflation: 0.37%
- Source: Direcção dos Serviços de Estatística e Censos, February 2017
- Pegged with: Hong Kong dollar (HK$); HK$1 = MOP 1.03

Macanese pataca

Chinese name
- Traditional Chinese: 澳門元
- Simplified Chinese: 澳门元
Transcriptions
Standard Mandarin
- Hanyu Pinyin: Àomén yuán
- Wade–Giles: Ao^{4}-men^{2} yüan^{2}
Yue: Cantonese
- Yale Romanization: Oumún yùhn
- Jyutping: ou^{3} mun^{4-2} jyun^{4}

Portuguese name
- Portuguese: Pataca de Macau

The Macanese pataca or Macau pataca (Chinese: 澳門元; Cantonese Yale: Oumún yùhn; Portuguese: Pataca de Macau; sign: MOP$; ISO code: MOP) is the currency of Macau. It is subdivided into 100 avos (仙; sin), with 10 avos called ho (毫) in Cantonese.

Macau has a currency board system under which the pataca is 100 per cent backed by foreign exchange reserves, in this case currently the Hong Kong dollar (itself backed by the United States dollar). Moreover, the currency board, Monetary Authority of Macau (AMCM), has a statutory obligation to issue and redeem Macau pataca on demand against the Hong Kong dollar at a fixed exchange rate of HK$1 = MOP 1.03, and without limit.

== History ==
The Spanish dollar was in wide use in Asia and the Americas between the 16th to 20th centuries, and was imported by China in large quantities. They were typically minted in Mexico and then brought to the Philippines as part of the Spanish East Indies through the Manila-Acapulco galleon trade to be traded and circulated across the Far East. It was known to the Portuguese as the pataca mexicana. At the end of the 19th century various versions of this silver dollar or pataca were in use in Macau, in the form of Spanish dollars, the British trade dollars of Hong Kong and the Straits Settlements, as well as the silver dollars and fractional coinage of the neighbouring province of Canton.

In 1894, the pataca was introduced as a unit of account in Portuguese Macau and Portuguese Timor at a rate of 1 pataca = 450 réis, equivalent to the Mexican peso or Philippine peso. In 1901, it was decided to have a uniquely Macau currency, and for that purpose, the Banco Nacional Ultramarino was granted exclusive rights to issue legal tender banknotes that were to be denominated in patacas. On 27 January 1906, pataca notes in denominations of 1, 5, 50 and 100 were introduced and all foreign coinage was outlawed, the idea being to make the pataca paper notes the sole legal tender currency in Macau. However, the Chinese, being so accustomed to using silver for barter, were suspicious of this new paper money, and as such, the paper pataca always circulated at a discount in relation to the silver dollar coins. Conversely, a similar action at exactly the same time in the Straits Settlements, and for the same purpose, had the different effect of putting the new Straits dollar into the gold exchange standard. Hence both the Macau pataca and the Straits dollar were launched at a sterling value of 2 shillings and 4 pence, but where the Straits dollar remained at that value until the 1960s, the Macau pataca fluctuated with the value of silver, just like the Hong Kong unit.

In 1935, when Hong Kong and China abandoned the silver standard, the Hong Kong unit was pegged to sterling at a rate of 1 shilling and 3 pence, while the Macau pataca was pegged to the Portuguese escudo at a rate of MOP 1 = Esc 5$50. This meant that the Macau pataca was worth only 1 shilling and was therefore at a discount of 3 pence in relation to the Hong Kong unit.

The first exclusively Macau coinage was not introduced until the year 1952, which happened to be the year after the last pataca fractional coins were minted for East Timor. In that year in Macau, denominations below 10 patacas were replaced by coins.

Pegs for the Macau pataca
Date established	1 pataca =
1894	1 Spanish/Mexican/Philippine peso
1935	5.5 Portuguese escudos
1949	5 Portuguese escudos
1967	4.75 Portuguese escudos
1973	5.015 Portuguese escudos
	1 Hong Kong dollar =
1977	1.075 patacas
1978	1.0025 patacas
1979	1.0425 patacas
1983	1.03 patacas

In 1980, the Macau government set up the Issuing Institute of Macau (Instituto Emissor de Macau; abbr. as IEM), which was given the monopoly right to issue pataca notes. The BNU became the IEM's agent bank and continued to issue banknotes. On agreement with the BNU on 16 October 1995, the Macau branch of Bank of China (Banco da China, 中國銀行澳門分行) became the second note-issuing bank. The authority to issue patacas was transferred to the Monetary Authority of Macau.

== Coins ==
Coins were not issued for use in Macau until 1952, with the 20 cent coin of Canton Province circulating. In 1952, bronze 5 and 10 avos, cupro-nickel 50 avos and .720 fineness silver 1 and 5 patacas were introduced. Nickel-brass replaced bronze in 1967, including the last issue of 5 avos. Nickel replaced silver in the 1 pataca in 1968. In 1971, a final (.650 fineness) silver issue of 5 patacas was produced.

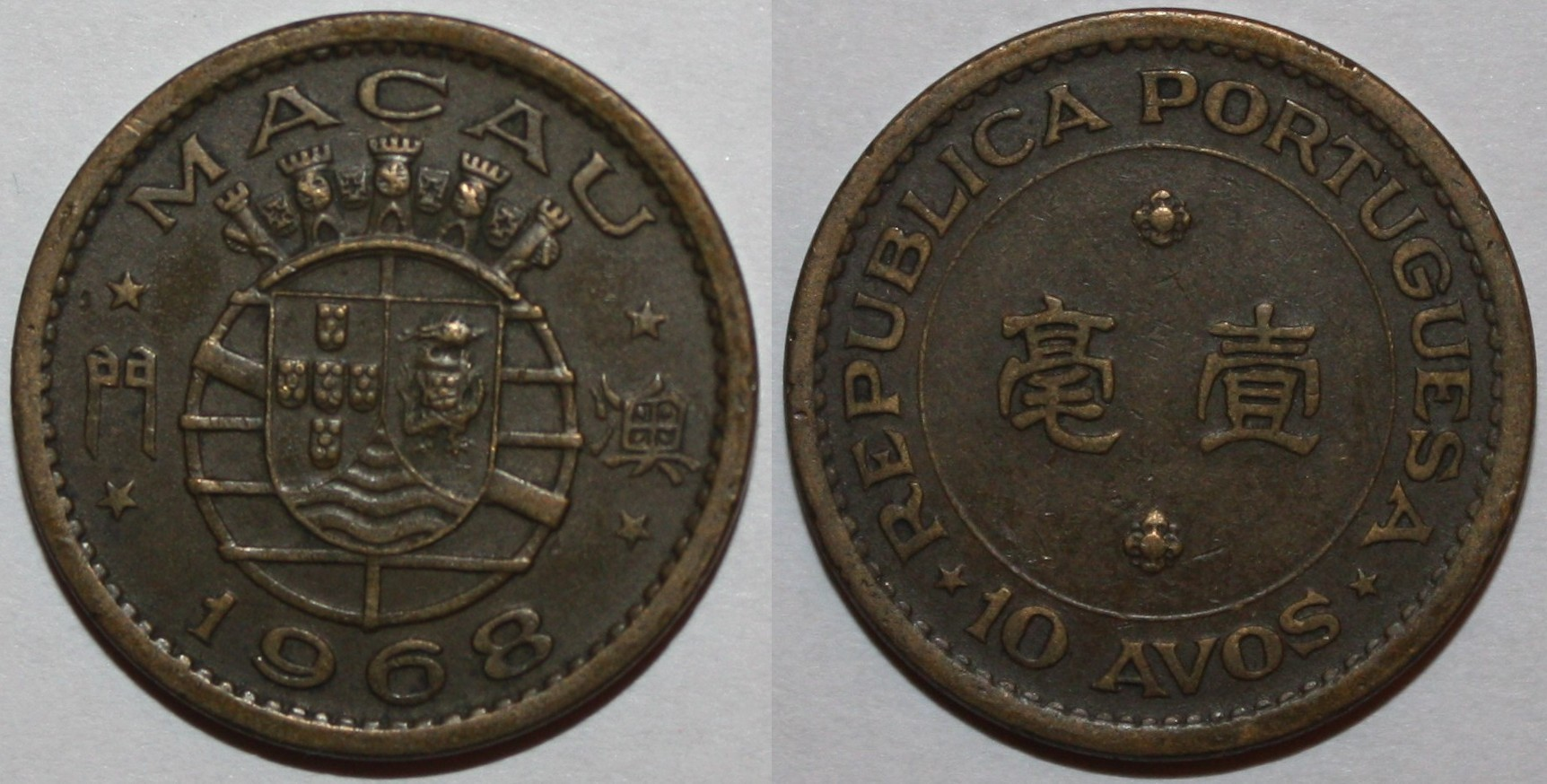
10 avos, 1968

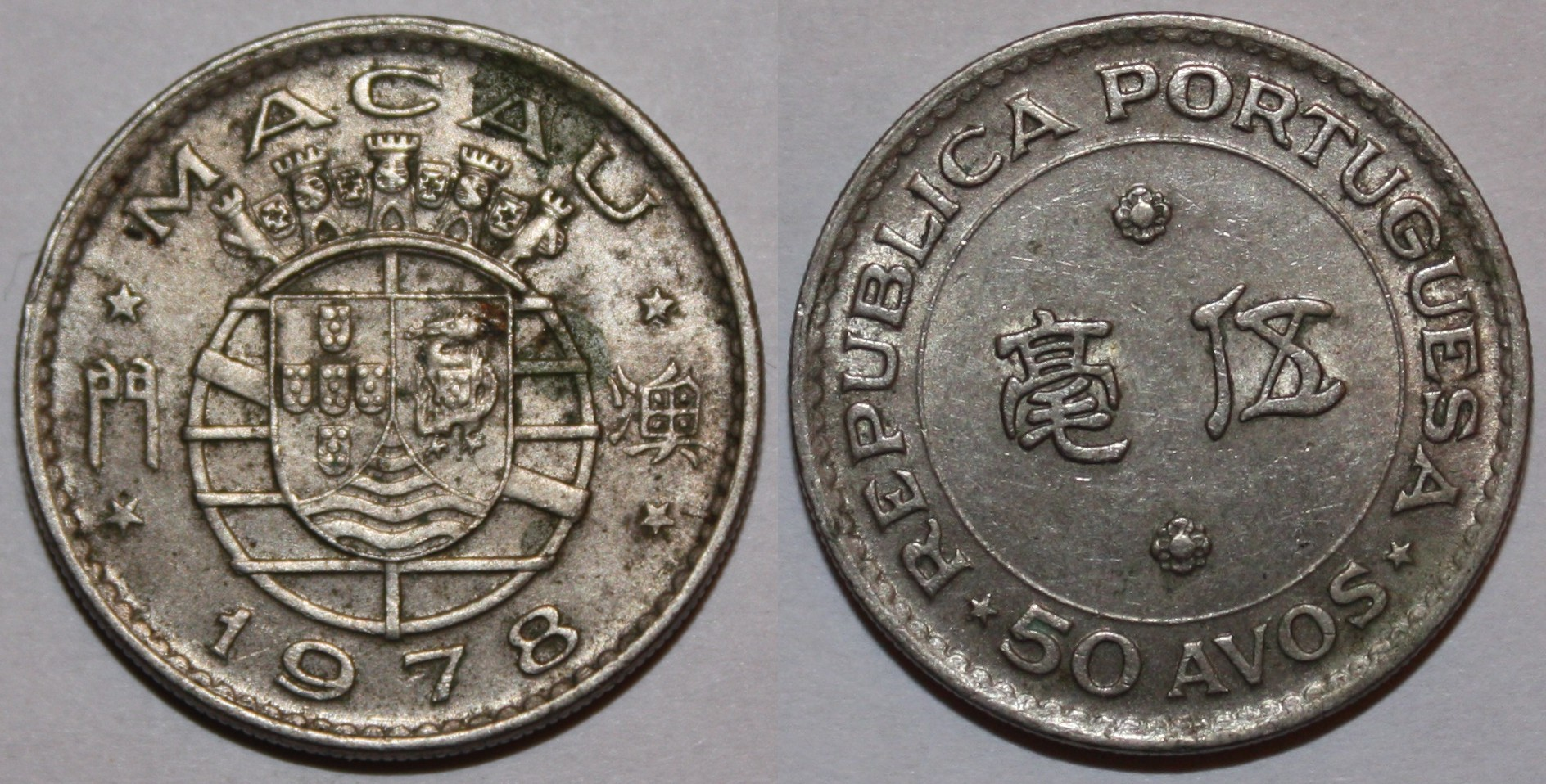
50 avos, 1978

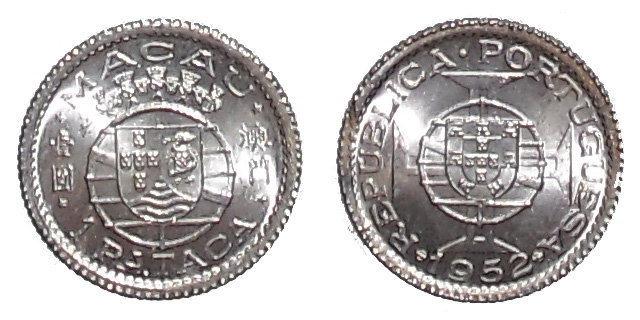
1 pataca, 1952

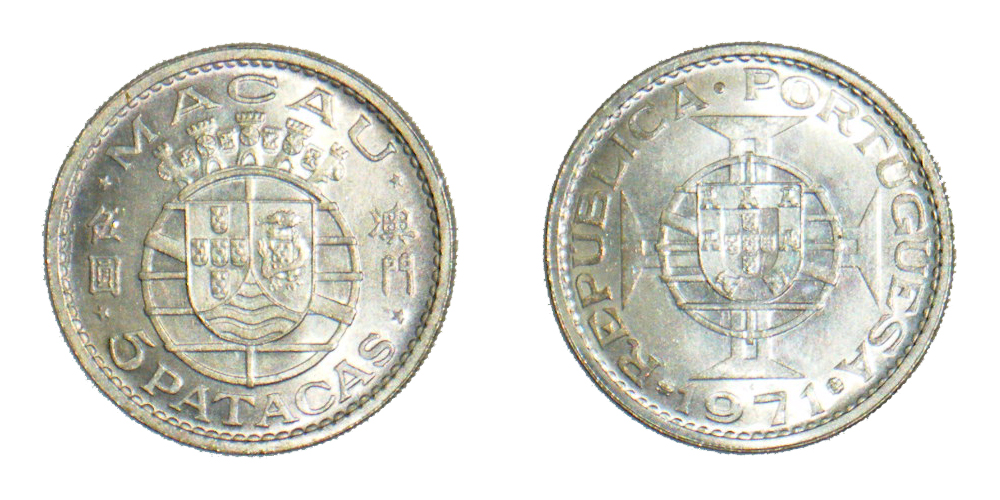
5 patacas, 1971

Brass 10, 20 and 50 avos and cupro-nickel 1 and 5 patacas were introduced in 1982. The 20 avos and 5 patacas became dodecagonal in 1993 and 1992, respectively, whilst a bimetallic 10 patacas was introduced in 1997 and a cupronickel 2 patacas in 1998. Coins are issued by the Monetary Authority of Macau.

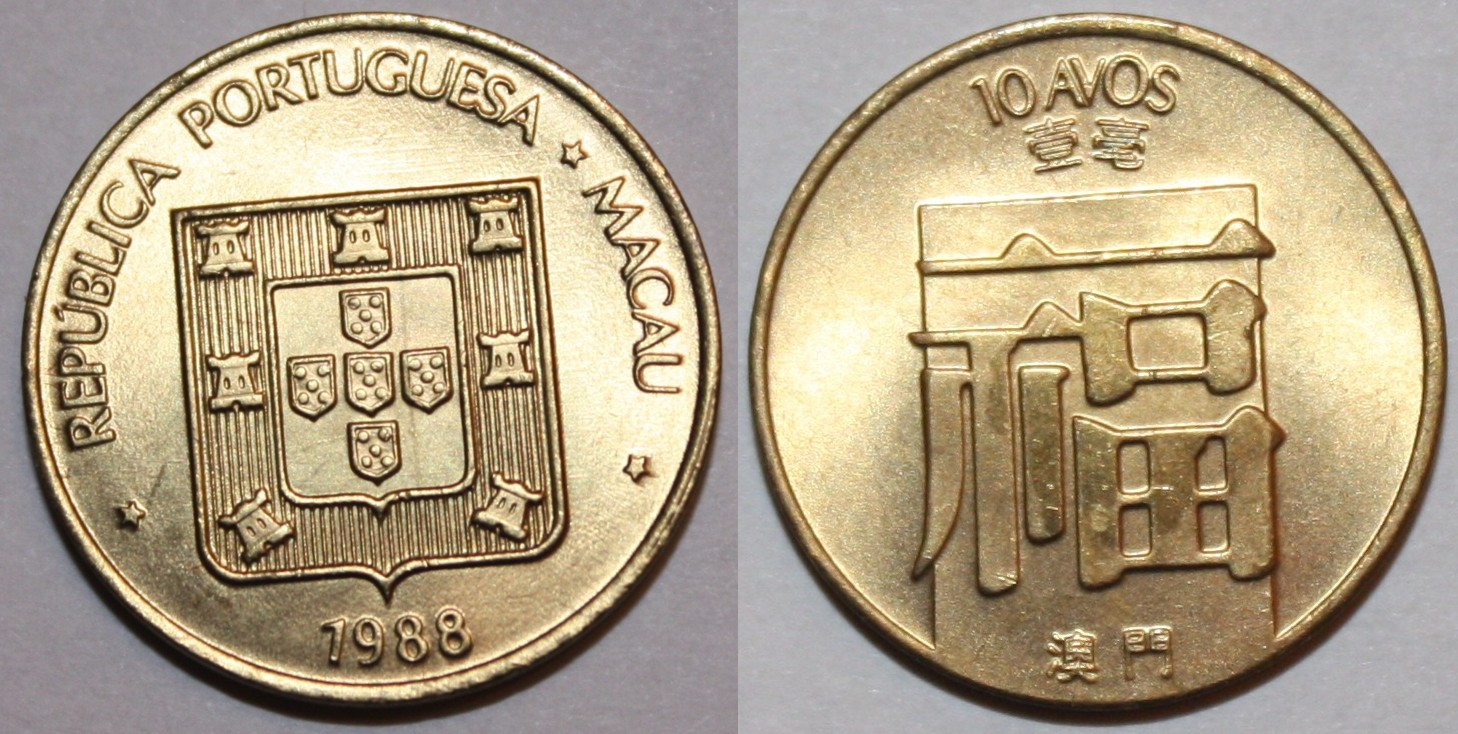
10 avos, 1988

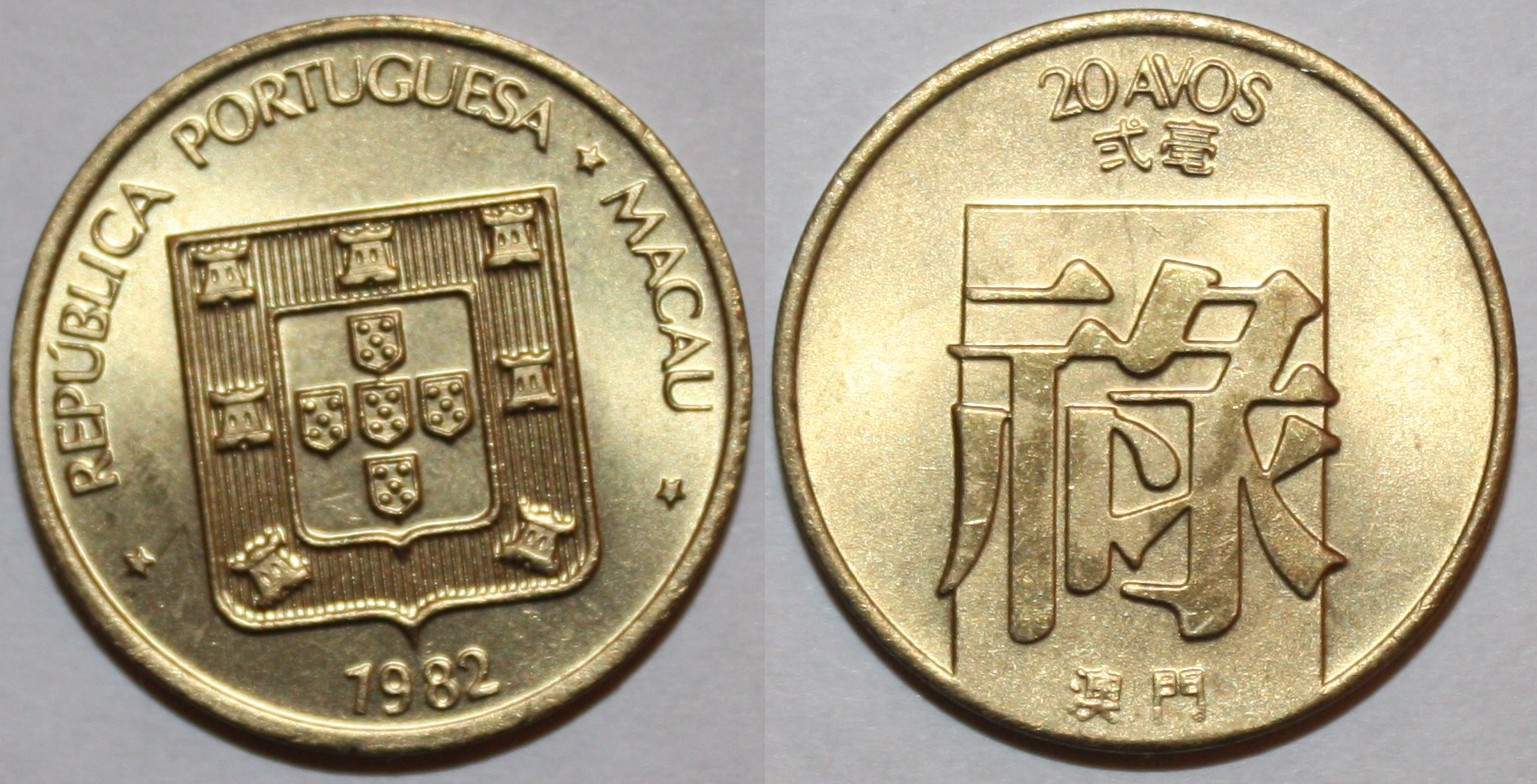
20 avos, 1982

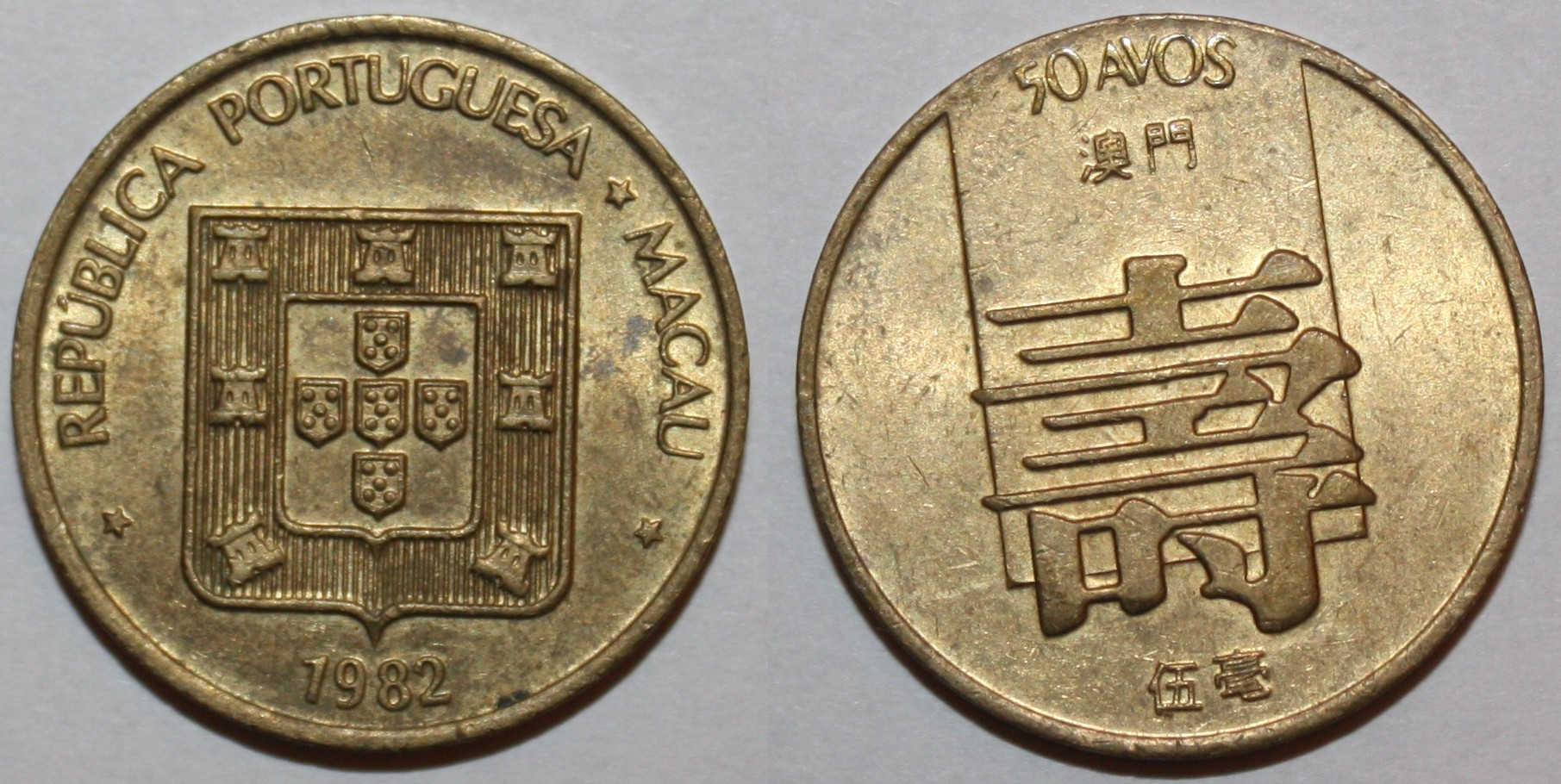
50 avos, 1982

Currently circulating coins
Image		Value	Description			First Minted Year
Obverse	Reverse	Value	Composition	Obverse	Reverse	First Minted Year
		10 avos	Brass	"Macau", "澳門"	Value, Lion Dance Costume Head	1993
(missing photo)	(missing photo)	20 avos	Brass	"Macau", "澳門"	Denomination, Dragon boat	1993
		50 avos	Brass	"Macau", "澳門"	Denomination, Dragon dance	1993
		$1	Cupronickel	"Macau", "澳門"	Value, Guia Lighthouse	1992
(missing photo)	(missing photo)	$2	Cupronickel	"Macau", "澳門"	Denomination, Templo de A-Má and Penha church	1998
		$5	Cupronickel	"Macau", "澳門"	Denomination, Cathedral of Saint Paul, Chinese junk	1992
(missing photo)	(missing photo)	$10	Ring: Brass; Center: Cupronickel	"Macau", "澳門"	Value, St. Dominic's Church of Macau	1997

== Banknotes ==
Both sides of $100 issued by BNU on 13 July 1992

In a similar arrangement to the issue of banknotes in Hong Kong, Macau's banknotes are not issued by a central bank or monetary authority but by two commercial banks, the Banco Nacional Ultramarino and the Bank of China. Owing to Macau's Portuguese colonial past, banknotes are printed in Portuguese as well as Chinese, including the name of the Bank of China which is written as both "Banco da China" and "中國銀行".

Following the initial issues of pataca banknotes in 1906, the new currency was supplemented the following year by 10 and 25 pataca notes, and in February 1920, 5, 10 and 50 avo notes were added. In 1923, the Banco Vui Hang introduced 10 pataca notes which stated that they were backed by Cantonese 20 cent coins. These notes were followed until 1934 by cashier's cheques issued by various banks in denominations of 1, 5, 10, 50, 100, 200, 400, 800 and 1,000 dollars, presumably equivalent to the pataca. The BNU issues were augmented by 1 and 20 avo notes in 1942, and in 1944, 500 pataca notes were introduced. Also in 1944, further cashier's cheques were issued, denominated 1,000 yuan and NC$5,000. The 25 pataca note was discontinued after 1958.

On 8 August 1988, BNU issued a 1000 pataca banknote, the highest value banknote yet. Because 8 in Chinese (ba) is similar to "getting rich" (fa; 發), this unique date, which occurs only once per century, gives the note a special meaning. Another feature is the replacement of the coat of arms of Portugal with BNU's logo, shedding a political symbol in the prospect of reunification with China. In 1995, the Bank of China introduced notes in denominations of 10, 50, 100, 500 and 1000 patacas. Both the BNU and Bank of China introduced 20 pataca notes in 1996.

=== Current issue ===
Banknotes are currently issued in denominations of 10, 20, 50, 100, 500 and 1,000 patacas. The current series of BNU banknotes was issued in 2005, while the Bank of China notes were last issued between 1995 and 2003. The dimensions of the banknotes are the same as that of Hong Kong banknotes worth the corresponding number of dollars. On 20 December 1999, the day Macau was retroceded to China, banknotes of all values (except for 10 patacas) by both banks were reissued with that date. On 5 January 2009, the Monetary Authority of Macau announced a new series of banknotes, dated 2008, released by the Bank of China. In 2024, both the Banco Nacional Ultramarino and the Bank of China (Macau) are set to introduce a new series of notes. The denomination structure is the same as previous issues, but the notes come with advanced security features and include features accessible for those with visual impairments.

Banco Nacional Ultramarino 1990 Series Banknote
Value	Description				Printed Date	Watermark
Value	Dimensions	Color	Obverse	Reverse	Printed Date	Watermark
$10	138 × 69 mm	Brown	Sun Yat Sen Memorial House	A view of Macau in the 1990s, Ponte Governador Nobre de Carvalho	8 July 1991	Chinese junk
$10	138 × 69 mm	Red, Violet	Sun Yat Sen Memorial House	A view of Macau in the 1990s, Ponte Governador Nobre de Carvalho	8 January 2001; 8 June 2003	Chinese junk
$20	143 × 71.5 mm	Violet	Old BNU headquarters	A view of Macau in the 1990s, Ponte Governador Nobre de Carvalho	1 September 1996; 20 December 1999	Chinese junk
$50	148 × 74 mm	Yellow	Lion dance	A view of Macau in the 1990s, Ponte Governador Nobre de Carvalho	13 July 1992; 20 December 1999	Chinese junk
$100	153 × 76.5 mm	Blue	Chinese junk	A view of Macau in the 1990s, Ponte Governador Nobre de Carvalho	13 July 1992; 20 December 1999; 8 June 2003	Chinese junk
$500	158 × 79 mm	Green, yellow and orange	A-Ma Temple	A view of Macau in the 1990s, Ponte Governador Nobre de Carvalho	3 September 1990; 20 December 1999; 8 June 2003	Chinese junk
$1,000	163 × 81.5 mm	Red	Dragon	A view of Macau in the 1990s, Ponte Governador Nobre de Carvalho	8 August 1988; 8 July 1991; 20 December 1999	Chinese junk

Bank of China 1995 Series Banknote
Value	Description				Printed Date	Watermark
Value	Dimensions	Color	Obverse	Reverse	Printed Date	Watermark
$10	138 × 69 mm	Brown	Lighthouse at Guia Fortress	Bank of China, Macau branch	16 October 1995	Lotus
$10	138 × 69 mm	Red and orange	Lighthouse at Guia Fortress	Bank of China, Macau branch	8 January 2001; 2 February 2002; 8 December 2003	Lotus
$20	143 × 71.5 mm	Violet	A-Ma Temple	Bank of China, Macau branch	1 September 1996; 20 December 1999; 8 December 2003	Lotus
$50	148 × 74 mm	Yellow-grey	University of Macau	Bank of China, Macau branch	16 October 1995; 1 November 1997; 20 December 1999	Lotus
$100	153 × 76.5 mm	Blue	Outer Harbour Ferry Terminal	Bank of China, Macau branch	16 October 1995; 20 December 1999; 2 February 2002; 8 December 2003	Lotus
$500	158 × 79 mm	Green	Ponte de Amizade	Bank of China, Macau branch	16 October 1995; 20 December 1999; 2 February 2002; 8 December 2003	Lotus
$1000	163 × 81.5 mm	Orange	Sai Van (Praia do Bom Parto)	Bank of China, Macau branch	16 October 1995; 20 December 1999; 8 December 2003	Lotus

Banco Nacional Ultramarino 2005 Series Banknote
Image		Value	Description				Printed Date	Watermark
Obverse	Reverse	Value	Dimensions	Color	Obverse	Reverse	Printed Date	Watermark
		$10	138 × 69 mm	Red	Statue of Mazu	BNU building	8 August 2005; 8 August 2010; 11 November 2013; 6 November 2017	Lotus
		$20	143 × 71.5 mm	Violet	Macau International Airport	BNU building	8 August 2005; 8 August 2010; 11 November 2013; 6 November 2017	Lotus
		$50	148 x 74 mm	Brown	Sai Van Bridge	BNU building	8 August 2009; 11 November 2013; 6 November 2017	Lotus
		$100	153 × 76.5 mm	Blue	Largo do Senado (Senate Square)	BNU building	8 August 2005; 8 August 2010; 11 November 2013; 6 November 2017	Lotus
		$500	158 × 79 mm	Green	Macau Tower	BNU building	8 August 2005; 8 August 2010; 11 November 2013; 6 November 2017	Lotus
		$1,000	163 × 81.5 mm	Orange	Macau Cultural Centre	BNU building	8 August 2005; 8 August 2010; 11 November 2013; 6 November 2017	Lotus

Bank of China 2008 Series Banknote
Image		Value	Description				Printed Date	Watermark
Obverse	Reverse	Value	Dimensions	Color	Obverse	Reverse	Printed Date	Watermark
		$10	138 × 69 mm	Red	A-Ma Temple	Bank of China, Macau branch	8 August 2008; 1 July 2013; 6 November 2017	Lotus
		$20	143 × 71.5 mm	Violet	Façade of the ruins of Saint Paul's Cathedral	Bank of China, Macau branch	8 August 2008; 1 July 2013; 6 November 2017	Lotus
		$50	148 × 74 mm	Brown	Dom Pedro V Theatre	Bank of China, Macau branch	8 August 2008; 1 July 2013; 6 November 2017	Lotus
		$100	153 × 76.5 mm	Blue	Guia Lighthouse and Monte fort	Bank of China, Macau branch	8 August 2008; 1 July 2013; 6 November 2017	Lotus
		$500	158 × 79 mm	Green	Casa do Mandarim (House of the Mandarin)	Bank of China, Macau branch	8 August 2008; 1 July 2013; 6 November 2017	Lotus
		$1,000	163 × 81.5 mm	Orange	Leal Senado (Loyal Senate)	Bank of China, Macau branch	8 August 2008; 1 July 2013; 6 November 2017	Lotus

Bank of China 2020 Series Banknote
Value	Description				Printed Date	Watermark
Value	Dimensions	Color	Obverse	Reverse	Printed Date	Watermark
$10	138 × 69 mm	Red	the building of Bank of China in Macau, Southern Lion	Macau Tower observation lounge	18 May 2020	Lotus
$20	143 × 71.5 mm	Violet	the building of Bank of China in Macau, Southern Lion	Macau Science Center Exhibition Center and the Planetarium	18 May 2020	Lotus
$50	148 × 74 mm	Brown	the building of Bank of China in Macau, Southern Lion	Kiang Wu Hospital History Heritage Museum	18 May 2020	Lotus
$100	153 × 76.5 mm	Blue	the building of Bank of China in Macau, Southern Lion	Tung Sin Tong Historical Archive Exhibicion Hall	18 May 2020	Lotus
$500	158 × 79 mm	Green	the building of Bank of China in Macau, Southern Lion	A-Ma Temple	18 May 2020	Lotus
$1,000	163 × 81.5 mm	Orange	the building of Bank of China in Macau, Southern Lion	Chinese junk	18 May 2020	Lotus

Banco Nacional Ultramarino 2023 Series Banknote
Value	Description				Printed Date	Watermark
Value	Dimensions	Color	Obverse	Reverse	Printed Date	Watermark
$10	138 × 69 mm	Red	BNU Building	Map of Macau in 1635	18 May 2020	Lotus
$20	143 × 71.5 mm	Violet	BNU Building	Map of Macau in 1780	18 May 2020	Lotus
$50	148 × 74 mm	Brown	BNU Building	Map of Macau in 1889	18 May 2020	Lotus
$100	153 × 76.5 mm	Blue	BNU Building	Map of Macau in 1949	18 May 2020	Lotus
$500	158 × 79 mm	Green	BNU Building	Map of Macau in 1986	18 May 2020	Lotus
$1,000	163 × 81.5 mm	Orange	BNU Building	Map of Macau in 2022	18 May 2020	Lotus

=== Commemorative issues ===
In 2008, the Macau branch of the Bank of China issued four million 20 pataca banknotes in commemoration of the 29th Summer Olympic Games in Beijing.

In 2012, the Banco Nacional Ultramarino and Banco da China issued ten million 10 pataca banknotes to commemorate the Year of the Dragon, and from 2012 to 2023, the Banco National Ultramarino and the Banco da China are each authorized to issue a maximum number of 20 million special notes with the face value of 10 patacas to mark each lunar new year. The Bank of China also issued a 100 pataca banknote to commemorate its centennial anniversary.

In commemoration of the 20th anniversary of the transfer of Macau to the People's Republic of China, the Banco Nacional Ultramarino and the Banco da China issued five million 20 patacas banknotes. The front side of the notes feature the 7-ton gilded bronze sculpture "Lotus Flower In Full Bloom", representing the prosperity of Macau. The back side of the notes feature the Hong Kong-Zhuhai-Macao Bridge.

== Exchange rate ==
Current MOP exchange rates
From Google Finance:	AUD CAD CHF CNY EUR GBP HKD JPY USD TWD KRW SGD
From Yahoo! Finance:	AUD CAD CHF CNY EUR GBP HKD JPY USD TWD KRW SGD
From XE.com:	AUD CAD CHF CNY EUR GBP HKD JPY USD TWD KRW SGD
From OANDA:	AUD CAD CHF CNY EUR GBP HKD JPY USD TWD KRW SGD

Despite the fact that the pataca is the official currency of Macau, most of the money in circulation in the region is actually Hong Kong dollars. Patacas accounted for only 29.9% of Macau's money supply at the end of 1998. The exchange rate is pegged and is approximately MOP 1.03 for HK$1, and Hong Kong dollar banknotes and coins are generally accepted at par or MOP 1.00 for retail payments. For United States dollars, to which the Hong Kong dollar is in turn loosely pegged, the exchange rate is around MOP 8 to 1 US dollar. Although it is possible to exchange patacas in Macau, it is either difficult or impossible to do so elsewhere. The few places in Hong Kong where patacas are available are concentrated on Cleverly Street in Central, a short distance from the Hong Kong–Macau Ferry Terminal.

Although the pataca is the legal tender of Macau, the Hong Kong dollar is almost universally acceptable in the region, and in some cases, is preferred to the pataca. Circulation of the pataca is mandated by a decree (Decreto-Lei n.º 16/95/M) prohibiting refusal by merchants, but some casinos flout this rule and refuse bets in patacas. The Hong Kong dollar and Chinese yuan are generally accepted throughout Macau from casinos to restaurants. Payments to government agencies can also be made in both Hong Kong dollars and patacas.

As Macau currently imposes no restrictions on the import or export of local or foreign currency, visitors can change their currency in hotels, banks and bureaux de change located all around the city, including at 24-hour currency exchange booths in Macau International Airport (Taipa Island) and the Lisboa Hotel (Macau Peninsula) for customers who want to change their currency into patacas outside working hours.

MOP annual average middle exchange rate for major foreign currencies, from 2002 on (1 foreign currency unit to MOP)
Year	2002	2003	2004	2005	2006	2007	2008	2009
Hong Kong dollar	1.03	1.03	1.03	1.03	1.03	1.03	1.03	1.03
Renminbi	0.9706	0.9691	0.9693	0.9778	1.0025	1.0560	1.1546	1.1688
United States dollar	8.0334	8.0214	8.0226	8.0109	8.0006	8.0360	8.0206	7.9842
Pound sterling	12.0766	13.1040	14.6911	14.5820	14.6993	16.0887	14.8965	12.5159
New Taiwan dollar	0.2328	0.2332	0.2401	0.2494	0.2462	0.2447	0.2548	0.2418
Euro	7.5984	9.0696	9.9645	9.9721	10.0272	11.0049	11.8092	11.1309
Australian dollar	4.3703	5.2271	5.9021	6.1064	6.0169	6.7351	6.8552	6.3269
South Korean won	0.0065	0.0067	0.0070	0.0078	0.0084	0.0087	0.0074	0.0063
Japanese yen	0.0643	0.0692	0.0742	0.0729	0.0689	0.0683	0.0776	0.0854
Malaysian ringgit	2.1141	2.1109	2.1112	2.1155	2.1797	2.3374	2.4124	2.2669
New Zealand dollar	3.7306	4.6671	5.3214	5.6436	5.1889	5.9128	5.7341	5.0721
Singapore dollar	4.4893	4.6034	4.7452	4.8137	5.0294	5.3325	5.6788	5.4955
Swiss franc	5.1812	5.9632	6.4572	6.4424	6.3801	6.6998	7.4326	7.3721

MOP annual average middle exchange rate for major foreign currencies, 1990–2002 (1 foreign currency unit to MOP)
Year	1990	1991	1992	1993	1994	1995	1996	1997	1998	1999	2000	2001
Hong Kong dollar	1.03	1.03	1.03	1.03	1.03	1.03	1.03	1.03	1.03	1.03	1.03	1.03
Portuguese escudo	0.0564	0.0555	0.0593	0.0497	0.0481	0.0532	0.0517	0.0456	0.0443	0.0425	0.0370	0.0359
Deutsche Mark	4.9750	4.8362	5.1221	4.8199	4.9225	5.5677	5.2977	4.6049	4.5381	4.3601	3.7929	3.6794
French franc	1.4767	1.4222	1.5115	1.4076	1.4392	1.5988	1.5583	1.3679	1.3537	1.3000	1.1309	1.0971
United States dollar	8.0230	8.0041	7.9723	7.9679	7.9602	7.9679	7.9664	7.9749	7.9788	7.9918	8.0260	8.0335
Pound sterling	14.3239	14.1421	14.0998	11.9638	12.1982	12.5766	12.4392	13.0709	13.2203	12.9284	12.1663	11.5698
Chinese yuan								0.9620	0.9637	0.9654	0.9695	0.9706
New Taiwan dollar								0.2788	0.2384	0.2477	0.2574	0.2379
Euro								9.0177	8.9532	8.5277	7.4183	7.1962
Australian dollar								5.9341	5.0203	5.1574	4.6739	4.1598
South Korean won								0.0086	0.0057	0.0067	0.0071	0.0062
Japanese yen								0.0661	0.0611	0.0704	0.0745	0.0662
Malaysian ringgit								2.8954	2.0387	2.1031	2.1121	2.1141
New Zealand dollar								5.2849	4.2816	4.2315	3.6684	3.3813
Singapore dollar								5.3851	4.7720	4.7160	4.6553	4.4867
Swiss franc								5.5020	5.5090	5.3278	4.7590	4.7638

== See also ==
- Economy of Macau
- Portuguese Timorese pataca

Preceded by: Mexican dollar, Chinese dollar Reason: creation of a local currency Ratio: at par (with Mexican dollar)	Currency of Macau; 1906 – Note: the pataca was made the unit of account in 1894	Succeeded by: Current
