= Lisbon Township =

Lisbon Township may refer to:

- Lisbon Township, Kendall County, Illinois
- Lisbon Township, Yellow Medicine County, Minnesota
- Lisbon Township, Sampson County, North Carolina, in Sampson County, North Carolina
- Lisbon Township, Davison County, South Dakota, in Davison County, South Dakota
