= Keith Fullerton Whitman =

American electronic musician (born 1973)

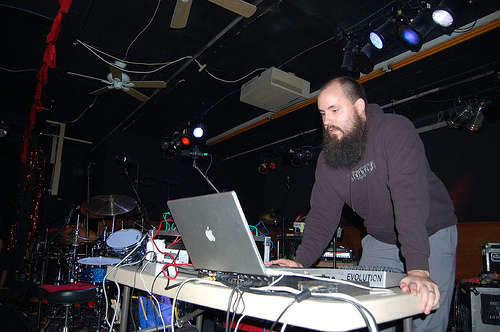
- Keith Fullerton Whitman in 2006

Background information
- Also known as: Hrvatski; ASCIII; Anonymous
- Born: May 29, 1973 (age 53)
- Origin: Somerville, Massachusetts, U.S.
- Genres: Electronic; ambient; drone; breakcore; experimental; noise
- Occupation: Musician
- Instruments: Computer; analog modular synthesizers; guitars
- Years active: 1994–present
- Labels: Kranky; Planet Mu; Locust Music; Carpark; PAN; Editions Mego
- Website: www.keithfullertonwhitman.com

Keith Fullerton Whitman (born May 29, 1973), also known as Hrvatski, is an American electronic musician who has recorded albums influenced by many genres, including ambient music, drill and bass, and krautrock.

== Career ==
Whitman studied computer music at Berklee College of Music, where he was exposed to modern electronic music composition and synthesis. Whitman says that before this he was initially drawn to making music by listening to the radio in the New York city suburbs in the 1980s. His moniker ASCIII has released music distributed with an academic journal. His studio and live setup usually consists of a PowerBook running Max/MSP or Logic Pro, and other analogue instruments, such as guitars, ouds, and synthesizers.

Whitman started recording using his own name in 2001, and most of his work recorded today is under that name. His brother, former MIT scientist Brian Alexander Whitman and co-founder of The Echo Nest, is also an electronic musician and sound artist performing under name Blitter.

Whitman has released music on record labels such as Planet Mu, Editions Mego, Kranky, and Carpark Records, as well on his own record label Reckankreuzungsklankewerkzeuge.

Whitman records and performs using many aliases, of which the best-known is Hrvatski (the Croatian word for Croatian). His works under the Hrvatski moniker mainly fell under the 'drill and bass' subgenre of IDM, and were his main musical outlet in the mid-to-late 1990s. Other solo aliases include ASCIII and Anonymous.

Whitman was in multiple bands in the 1990s, including El-Ron, The Liver Sadness, Sheket/Trabant, The Finger Lakes, and Gai/Jin.

Under the alias Hrvatski, Whitman released Swarm & Dither (2002). Under his real name, he released Playthroughs (2002), Multiples (2005), Lisbon (2006), and Generators (2012).

In 2013, Whitman released Greatest Hits on SoundCloud: a 12-hour-long audio project developed from samples of pop songs from his youth. Sample are snipped out, slowed to half speed and then run through his signature array of boxes and generators to create an "automatic enhancement" of the original tune.

== Other activities ==
Whitman has run Mimaroglu Music Sales which offered distribution of an extensive collection of avant-garde music. Mimaroglu Music Sales has been rechristened to Alpha State NYC in 2019. Whitman also operates Creel Pone, a bootleg record label that "re-issues" early electroacoustic & experimental recordings in CD-R format in small editions.

== Influences ==
As influences on his work, Whitman has mentioned the composers Bernard Bonnier, Luis de Pablo, Pietro Grossi, Costin Miereanu, Basil Kirchin, Dub Taylor, François Bayle, Steve Birchall, Michael Czajkowski, Douglas Leedy, Jacques Lejeune, and Richard Pinhas.

== Discography ==
=== Studio albums ===
- Okapi Tracks (as Hrvatski; MP3.com, 1999)
- Oiseaux 96-98 (as Hrvatski; Reckankreuzungsklankewerkzeuge, 1999)
- 21:30 for Acoustic Guitar... (Apartment B, 2001)
- Playthroughs (Kranky, 2002)
- Swarm & Dither (as Hrvatski; Planet Mu, 2002)
- Dartmouth Street Underpass (Locust Music, 2003)
- Antithesis (Kranky, 2004)
- Schöner Flußengel (Kranky, 2004)
- Irrevocably Overdriven Break Freakout Megamix (as Hrvatski; Entschuldigen, 2005)
- Multiples (Kranky, 2005)
- Twenty Two Minutes for Electric Guitar (Entschuldigen, 2005)
- Yearlong (with Greg Davis; Carpark, 2005)
- Taking Away (Digitalis Ltd., 2009)
- Dream House Variations (Arbor, 2009)
- Disingenuity b/w Disingenuousness (PAN, 2010)
- Generator (Root Strata, 2011)

=== Live albums ===
- Lisbon (Kranky, 2006)
- Generators (Editions Mego, 2012)
- Occlusions (Editions Mego, 2012)
- Live Occlusions (1) (Protracted View, 2013)
- Live Occlusions (2) (Protracted View, 2013)

=== Compilation appearances ===
- "20041203.Wfmu" on Brainwaves (2006)
