= Baltimore Theatre Project =

Performing arts center in Baltimore, Maryland, US

Coordinates: 39°18′16″N 76°37′5″W

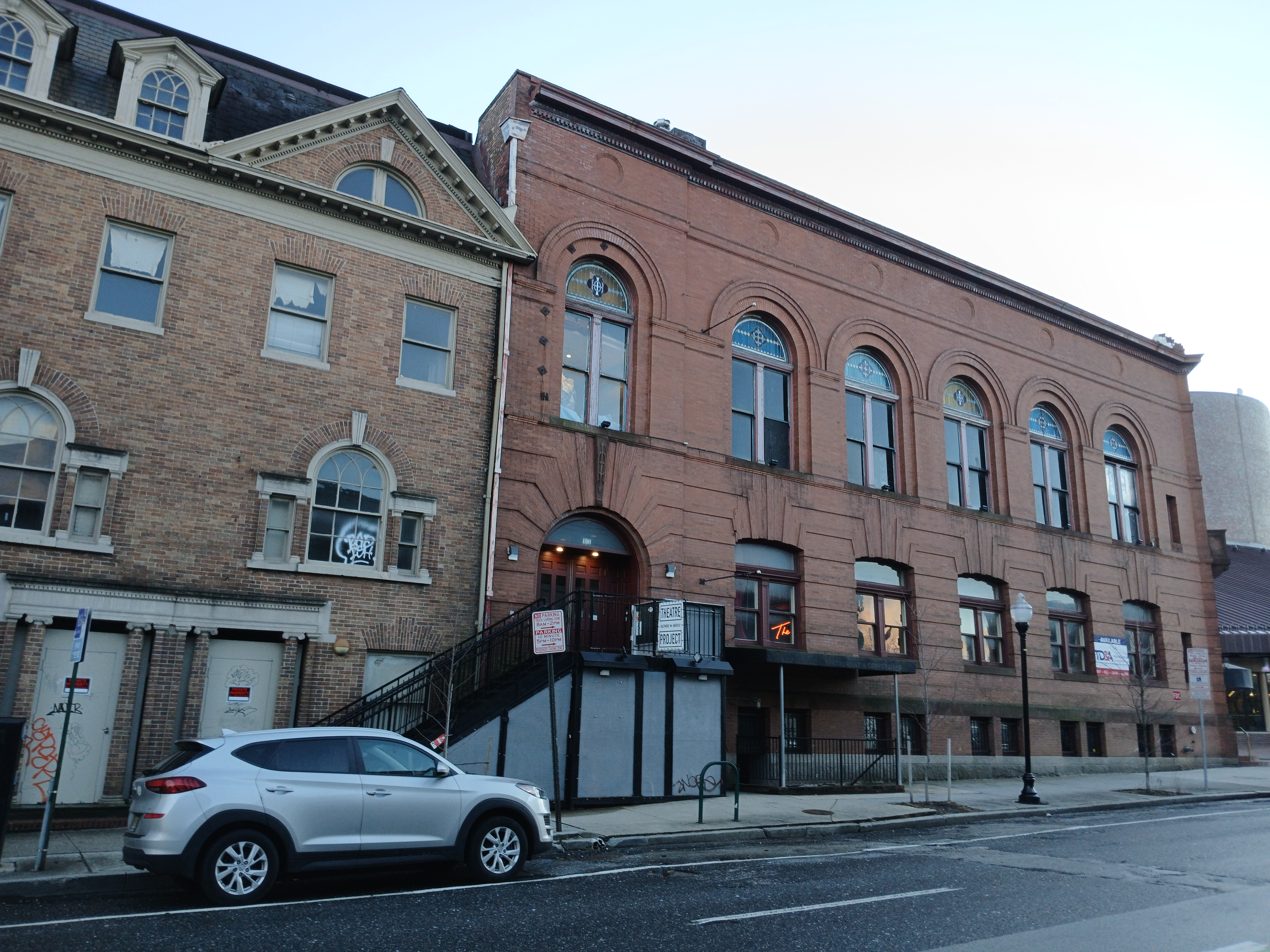
Baltimore Theatre Project in February, 2025

The Baltimore Theatre Project is a performing arts center in Baltimore, Maryland.

== Early years ==
The Baltimore Theatre Project was founded in 1971 by Philip Arnoult, as an addition to Antioch University. The project was initially recognised as Baltimore's Free Theatre, as all shows did not require an admission fee. Through the Theatre Project, Arnoult also established community outreach programs such as the Baltimore Neighborhood Arts Circus and Baltimore Voices.

Theatre companies, including Pilobolus Dance Theater, Urban Bush Women, Bread and Puppet Theatre, Studio Scarabee, the IOWA Theatre Lab, and Spiderwoman Theatre, were invited to perform at the theatre throughout the 1970s. Theatre Project was a co-producer of The New Theatre (TNT) Festivals at the University of Maryland, Baltimore County and downtown Baltimore (1976–1979).

In 1980, as part of Baltimore's campaign to eradicate rats throughout the city, the Theatre Project was hired to help convince the community to take the lead fighting rats in their neighborhood. They produced a musical, titled Rat Squad for elementary school audiences, which successfully reached tens of thousands of school children and was revived by the city the following year.

In the early 1980s, the termination of the theatre's affiliation with Antioch resulted in the cessation of free public performances.

== 1983–present ==
In 1983, the Baltimore Theatre Project began an extensive renovation of its main stage space. The performance and audience spaces were also redesigned.

In 1992, Robert Mrozek became the director of Theatre Project. During his tenure, artists such as Karen Finley; Danny Hoch; Holly Hughes; James Magruder; da da kamera's Daniel MacIvor; Squonk Opera; and David Drake performed.

In the fall of 2001, Anne Cantler Fulwiler took over the directorship of the Baltimore Theatre Project. Her tenure saw performances from local companies like Blue Rose Theatre, Run of The Mill, Air Dance Bernasconi as well as national performers like Jacksonville slam poet and playwright Al Letson.

In late 2009, Theatre Project became a recipient of stimulus funding from the Mid Atlantic Arts Foundation as part of the national stimulus project to fund the arts.

Chris Pfingsten became producing director in 2012.
