= Multiples (album) =

Studio album by Keith Fullerton Whitman
- Released: May 16, 2005
- Genre: Electronic
- Length: 47:01
- Label: Kranky
- Producer: Keith Fullerton Whitman

Keith Fullerton Whitman chronology
Schöner Flußengel (2004)	Multiples (2005)	Twenty Two Minutes for Electric Guitar (2005)

Professional ratings
Review scores
Source	Rating
AllMusic	4/5 stars
Pitchfork	9.1/10
Tiny Mix Tapes	4/5 marks

Multiples is a studio album by American electronic musician Keith Fullerton Whitman, released on Kranky in 2005.

Pitchfork placed it at number 36 on its list of the "Top 50 Albums of 2005".

== Track listing ==
No.	Title	Length
1.	"Stereo Music for Hi-Hat"	2:49
2.	"Stereo Music for Serge Modular Prototype – Part One"	3:36
3.	"Stereo Music for Serge Modular Prototype – Part Two"	5:39
4.	"Stereo Music for Serge Modular Prototype – Part Three"	1:54
5.	"Stereo Music for Yamaha Disklavier Prototype, Electric Guitar and Computer"	10:08
6.	"Stereo Music for Farfisa Compact Duo Deluxe, Drum Kit"	6:47
7.	"Stereo Music for Acoustic Guitar, Buchla Music Box 100, Hewlett Packard Model 236 Oscillator, Electric Guitar and Computer – Part One"	5:29
8.	"Stereo Music for Acoustic Guitar, Buchla Music Box 100, Hewlett Packard Model 236 Oscillator, Electric Guitar and Computer – Part Two"	10:32
