= New Lisbon =

New Lisbon is the name of several locations, named after the original Lisbon, Portugal:

== United States ==
- New Lisbon, Indiana
- New Lisbon, Randolph County, Indiana
- New Lisbon, New Jersey
- New Lisbon, New York
- New Lisbon, Ohio, today Lisbon, Ohio
- New Lisbon, Wisconsin

== Portuguese Empire ==
- New Lisbon, Angola, former name of Huambo, Angola, until 1975
- New Lisbon, Brazil, former name of Fortaleza, Brazil, until 1613
