= Banco Nacional Ultramarino =

Macau and Portuguese bank

Banco Nacional Ultramarino, S.A. 大西洋銀行
- Logo of BNU in Macau, adopted in 1994

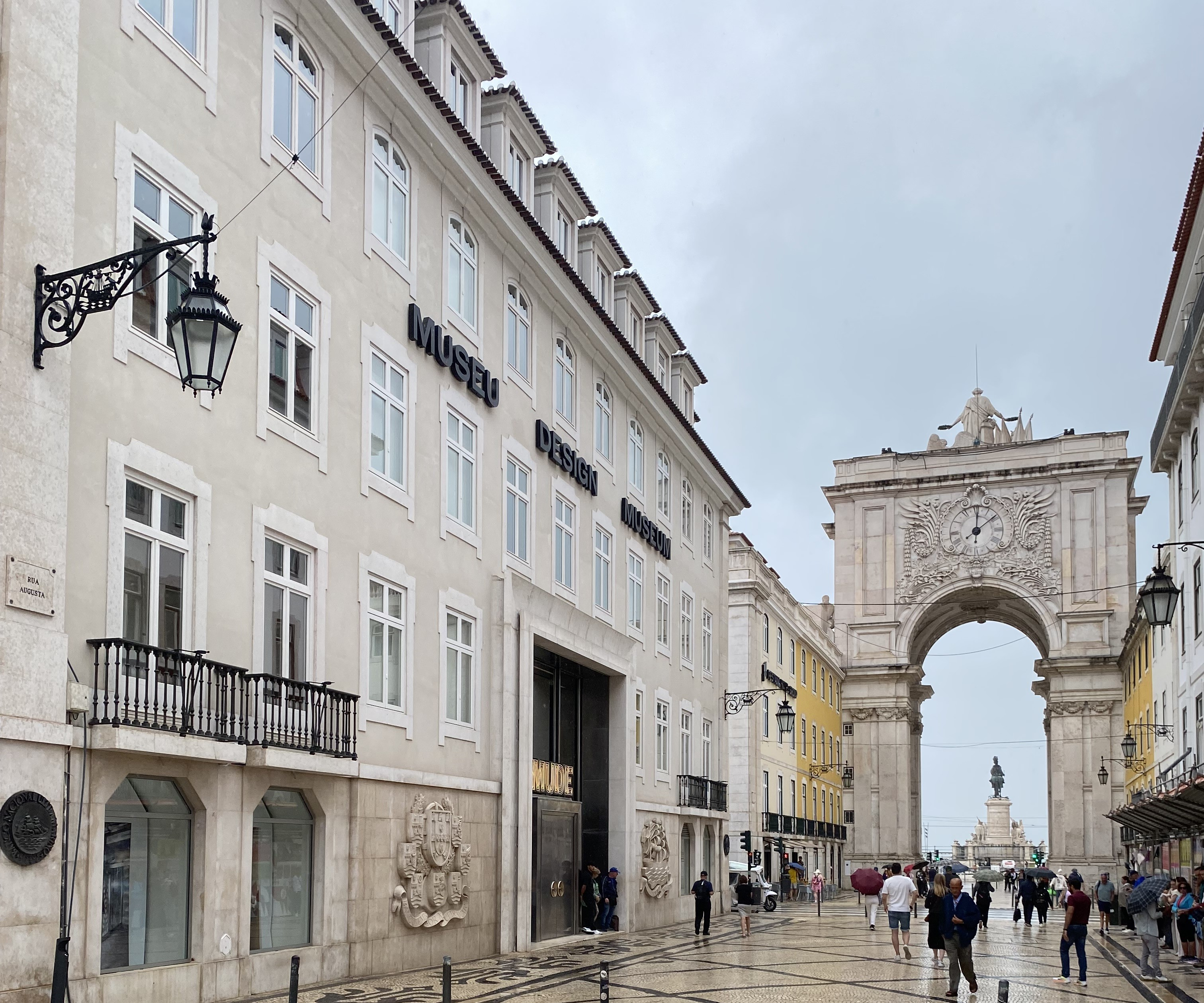
- Former BNU head office in Lisbon Baixa, lately Museu do Design e da Moda
- Type: Wholly owned subsidiary
- Industry: Banking
- Founded: 1864 in Lisbon, Portugal
- Headquarters: Macau
- Area served: Macau
- Products: Financial services
- Services: Personal banking, credit cards, banknotes
- Number of employees: 450 (2017)
- Parent: Caixa Geral de Depósitos (2001)
- Website: www.bnu.com.mo

Banco Nacional Ultramarino
- Traditional Chinese: 大西洋銀行
- Simplified Chinese: 大西洋银行
- Literal meaning: Atlantic Ocean Bank
Transcriptions
Standard Mandarin
- Hanyu Pinyin: Dàxīyáng Yínháng
Yue: Cantonese
- Jyutping: daai6 sai1 joeng4 ngan4 hong4

Banco Nacional Ultramarino, S.A. (Portuguese pronunciation: [ˈbɐ̃ku nɐsiuˈnal ultɾɐmɐˈɾinu], BNU; Chinese: 大西洋銀行; English: National Overseas Bank) is a Macanese banking and financial services corporation. It was historically a Portuguese bank with operations throughout the world, especially in Portugal's former overseas provinces. It ceased existence as an independent legal entity in Portugal following its merger in 2001 with Caixa Geral de Depósitos, the government-owned savings bank.

The bank continues operations today under the Banco Nacional Ultramarino brand in Macau, a Chinese special administrative region and former Portuguese colony, where it is also licensed to issue Macanese pataca banknotes.

== Timeline ==
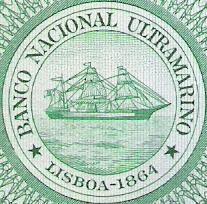
Seal of the Banco Nacional Ultramarino

Bas-relief at Banco Nacional Ultramarino in Lisbon heralding its role as overseas bank of issue (Portuguese: banco emissor no ultramar) in the Portuguese colonies other than Angola: clockwise from top, Macau, Cape Verde, Guinea, Mozambique, Indian territories, São Tomé and Príncipe, and Timor

Banco Nacional Ultramarino (BNU) was established in Lisbon, Portugal, in 1864 as a bank of issue for Portuguese overseas territories. the next year it opened branches in Luanda, Angola and Praia, Cabo Verde. Three years after that, in 1868, BNU opened branches in São Tomé and Príncipe, Goa, and Lourenço Marques, Mozambique.

In 1901, BNU lost its banking monopoly, but retained its note-issuing monopoly in the countries in which BNU operated.

BNU opened branches in Macau and in Bolama, Portuguese Guinea (present-day Guinea-Bissau) in 1902, in Dili, East Timor (present-day Timor Leste), and in Brazil, a representative office in Stanleyville and a branch in Paris in 1919, a representative office in Bombay in 1920.

In 1926, BNU lost its note-issuing monopoly in Angola following the creation of Banco de Angola. BNU transferred its branch in Stanleyville to Banco de Angola. In 1929, BNU established Anglo-Portuguese Colonial and Overseas Bank, its subsidiary in London, and converted its branch in Paris to a subsidiary, Banque Franco-Portugaise d’Outre-Mer.

In 1952, BNU closed its branches in India. In 1965, BNU, Banco Português do Atlântico, Banco de Angola, and the South African company, General Mining and Finance, founded Bank of Lisbon and South Africa. This was later renamed Mercantile Lisbon Bank. In the 1970s, BNU bought a stake in Banque Interatlantique in Luxembourg, and established a representative office in London.

In 1974 the Portuguese government nationalized BNU, following the Carnation Revolution. Immediately thereafter, in 1975, local governments nationalized BNU's interests in Mozambique, which became Banco de Moçambique, and in São Tomé and Príncipe, which became National Bank of São Tomé and Príncipe. In 1993, the government split National Bank into a central bank, Central Bank of São Tomé and Príncipe, and a commercial bank, Banco Internacional de São Tomé e Príncipe. In Cape Verde, BNU's interests became Bank of Cape Verde. In 1993, the government spun off the commercial banking operations into a new bank, Banco Comercial do Atlântico.

In 1988, the Portuguese Government-owned Caixa Geral de Depósitos became the majority shareholder of BNU, with the Republic of Portugal the sole other shareholder.

BNU opened a branch in London in 1991 and a branch in Zhuhai, a special economic zone of China, in 1993.

In 1993, Caixa Geral de Depósitos (CGD) became the majority shareholder in Banque Franco-Portugaise d’Outre-Mer. In 2002, CGD closed the bank by merging its operations into CGD's branch in Paris.

In 1995, the Chinese government confirmed that BNU would remain a note issuer in Macao until at least 2010.

In 1999, BNU opened representative offices in Mumbai and Panjim (Goa), and a branch in Dili, Timor Leste.

- 2000 – BNU reached an agreement with the Administration of Macau Special Administrative Region of the People's Republic of China, under which BNU remains an Agent of the Treasury.
- 2001 – BNU and Caixa Geral de Depósitos merged through incorporation of BNU into Caixa Geral de Depósitos; Banque Franco-Portugaise d’Outre-Mer became a branch of Caixa Geral; on July 1, 2000, the Macau branch of Banco Nacional Ultramarino became a bank incorporated in Macau SAR under the name Banco Nacional Ultramarino S.A., but remained wholly owned subsidiary of Caixa Geral de Depósitos, retaining until 2010 its functions as a note issuer and Agent of the Treasury.
- 2002 – Caixa Geral acquired majority ownership (64.8%) of the South African focused bank holding company – Mercantile Lisbon Bank Holdings Limited (MLBH), now known as Mercantile Bank Holdings Limited, which operates the Mercantile Bank.
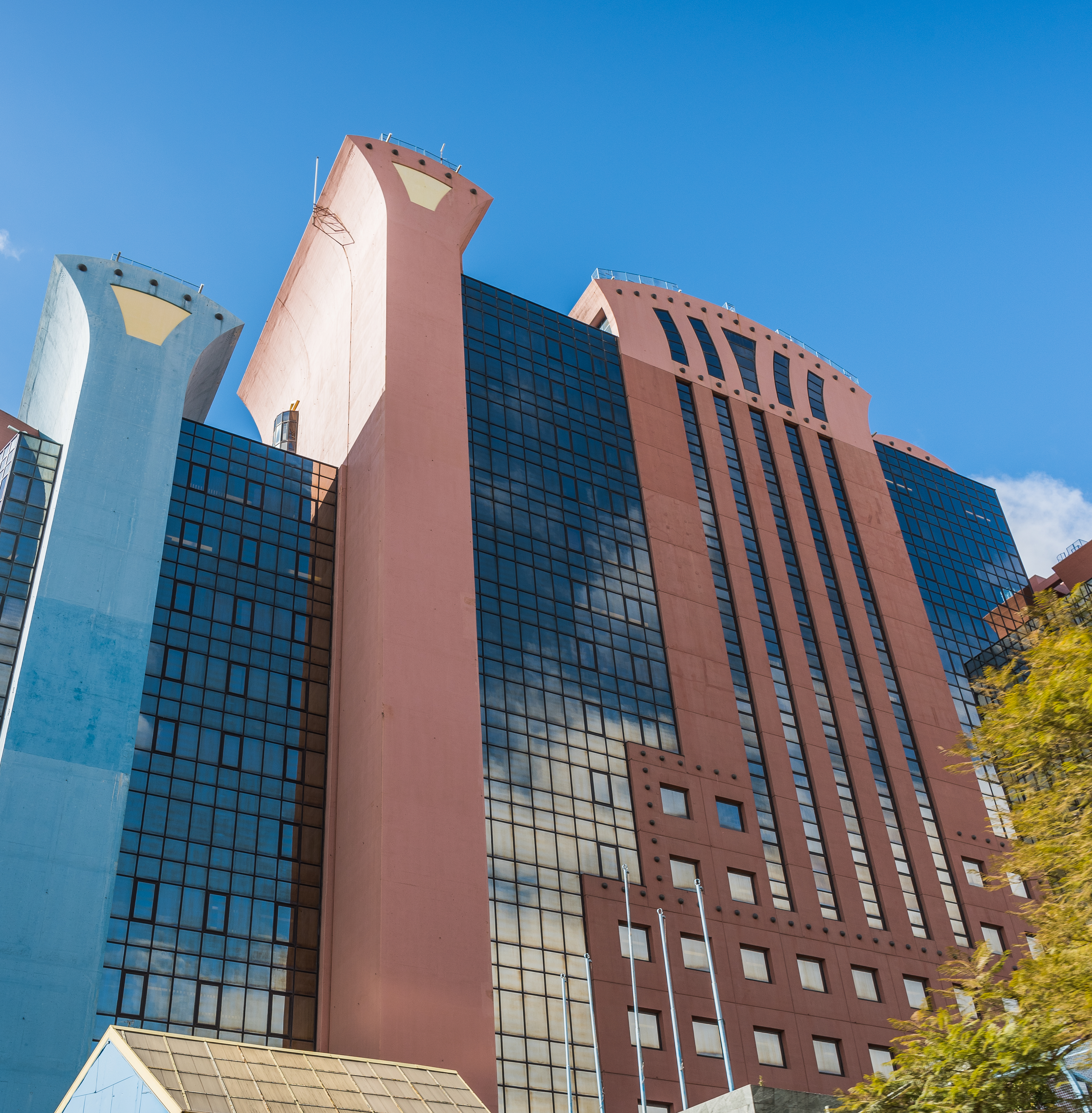
Building on Avenida 5 de Outubro in Lisbon, BNU head office from 1989 to 2001 and lately head office of Portugal's Instituto da Segurança Social, I.P.

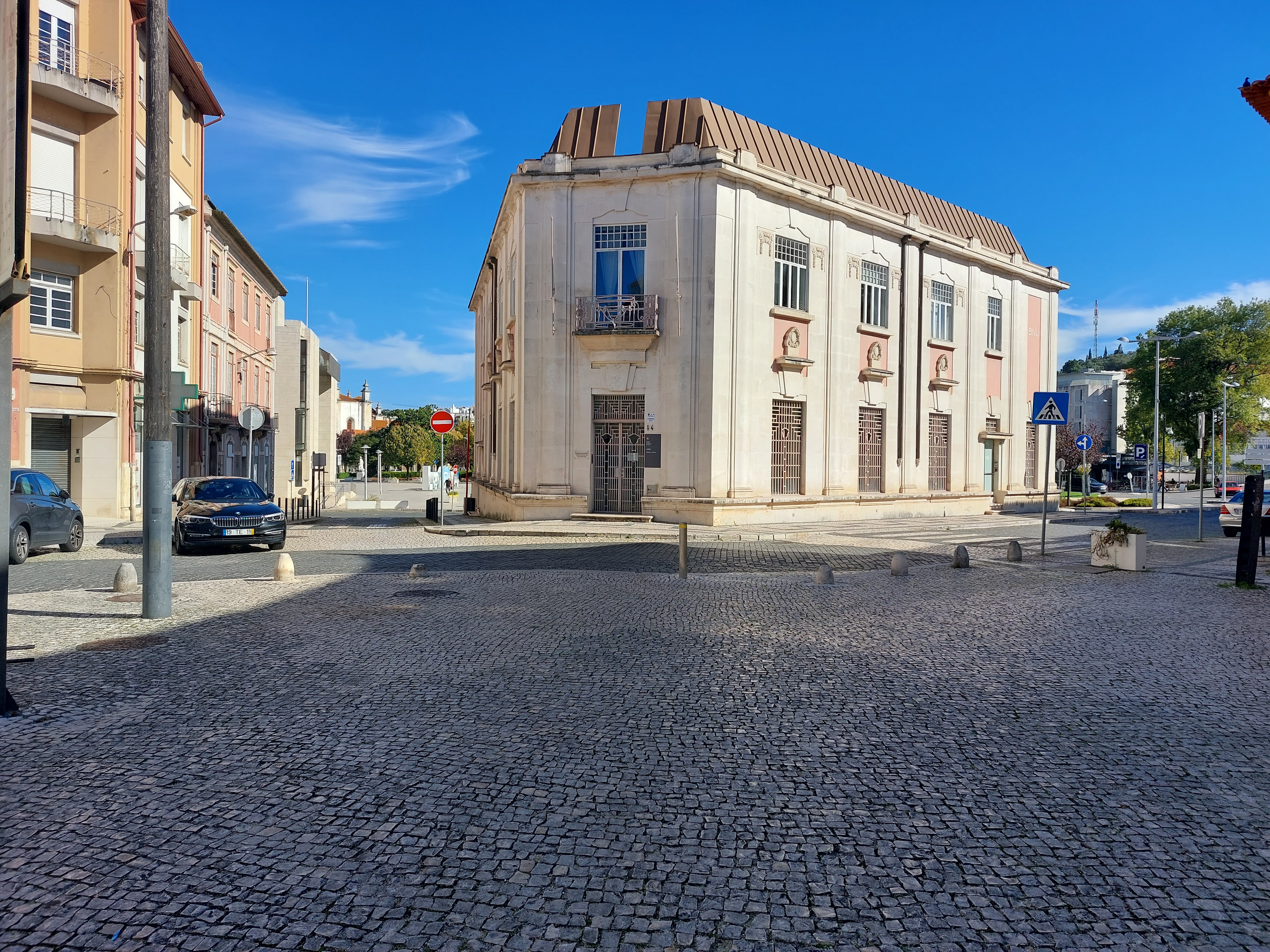
Former BNU building in Leiria, Portugal

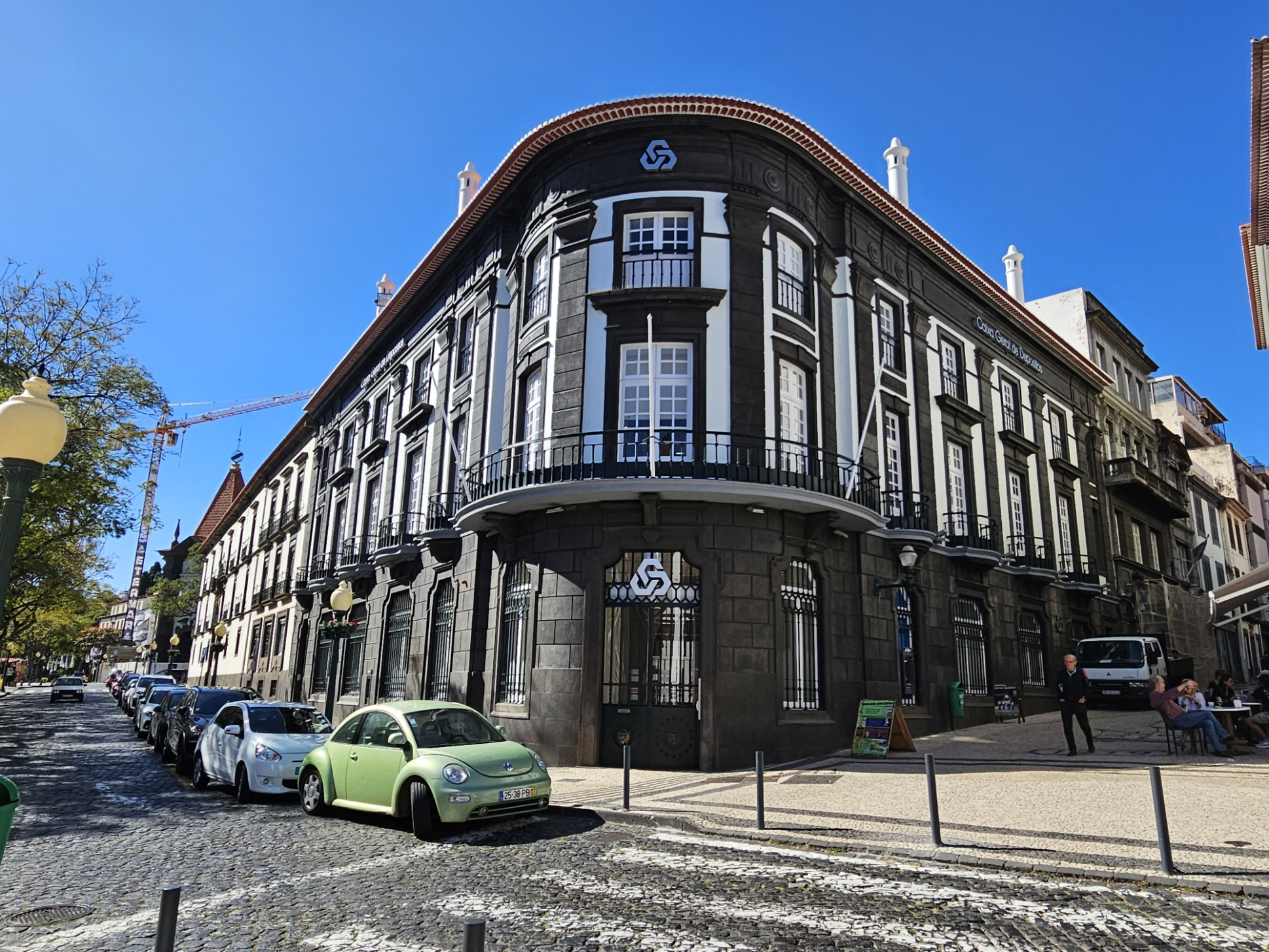
Former BNU building in Funchal, Madeira, lately a branch of Caixa Geral de Depósitos (CGD)

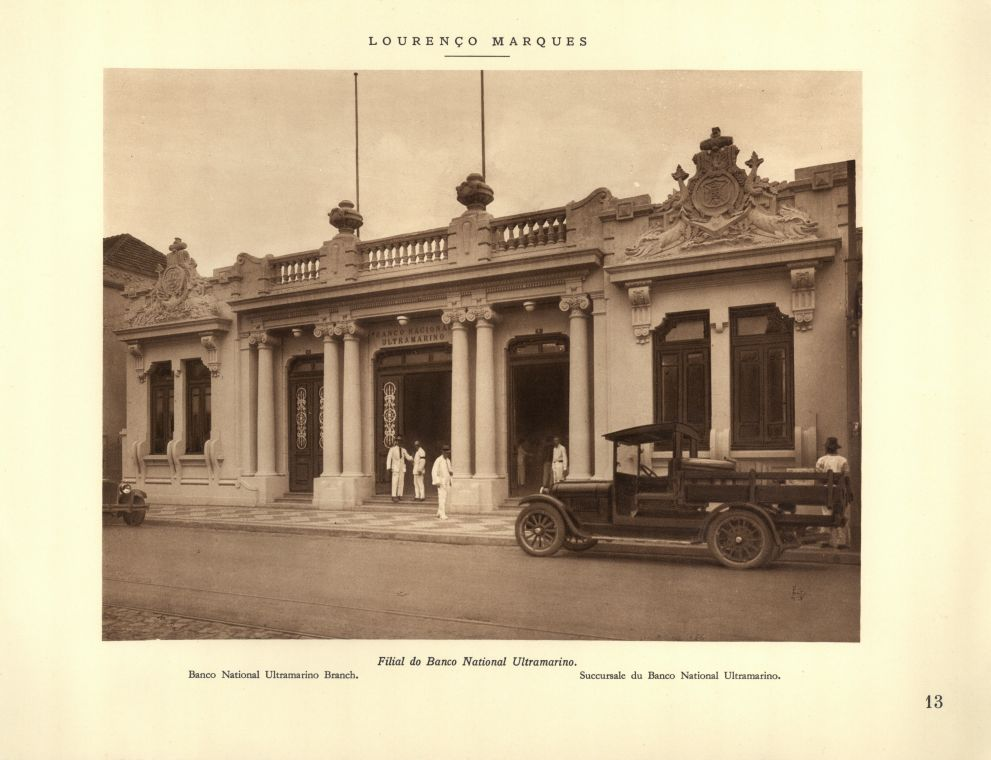
BNU building in Lourenço Marques, Mozambique in 1929

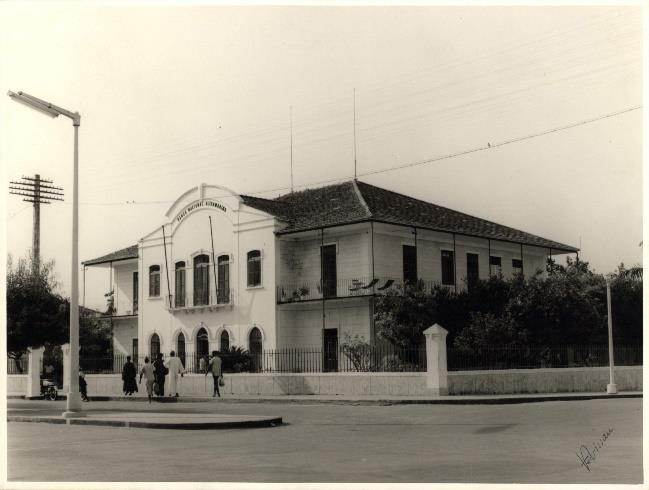
BNU building in Bissau, Pourtuguese Guinea around 1960

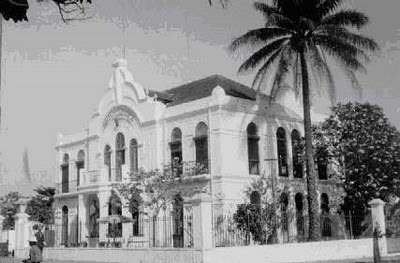
BNU building in Bolama, Guinea, in colonial times

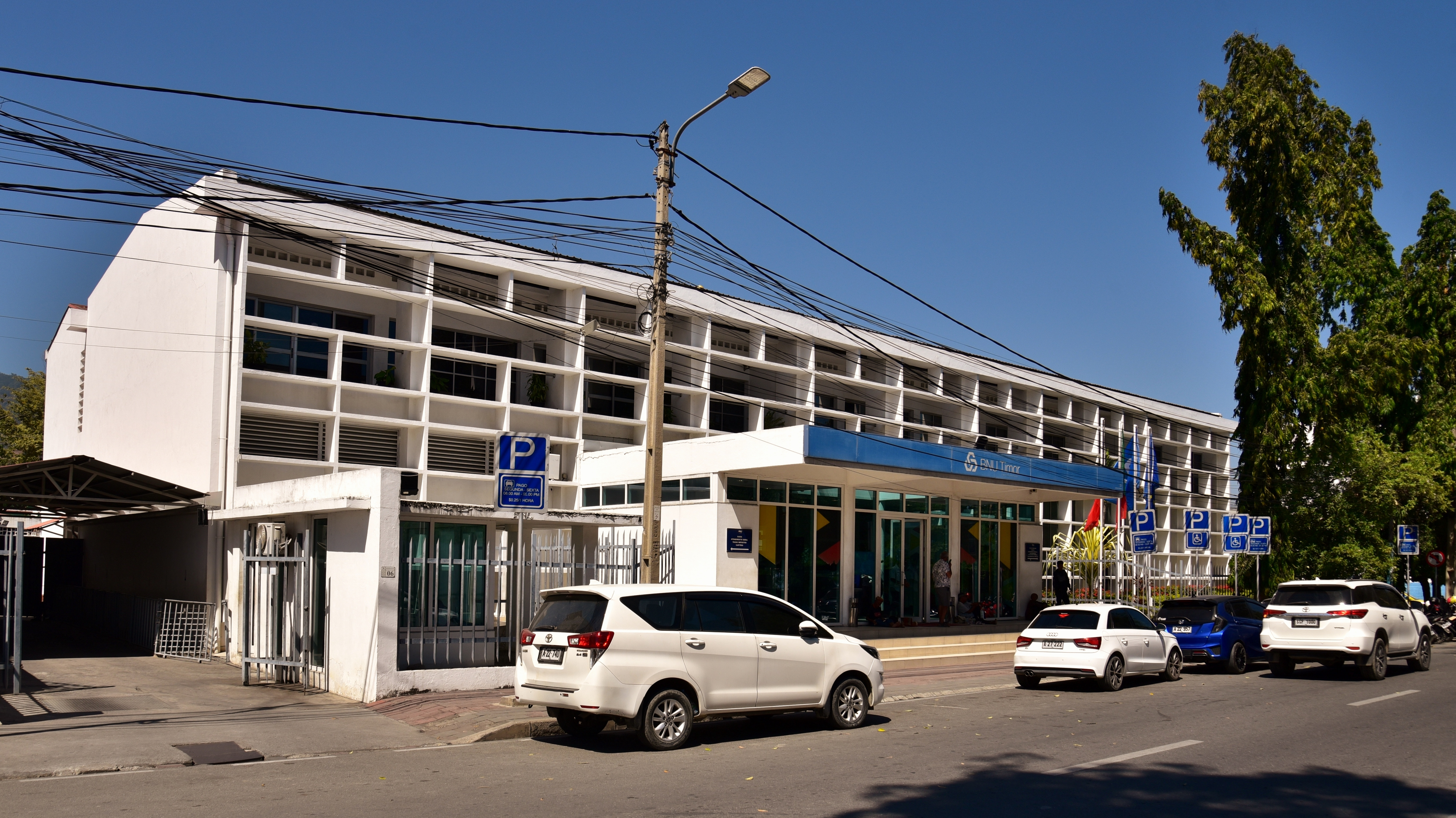
Former BNU building in Dili, East Timor, lately a branch of CGD

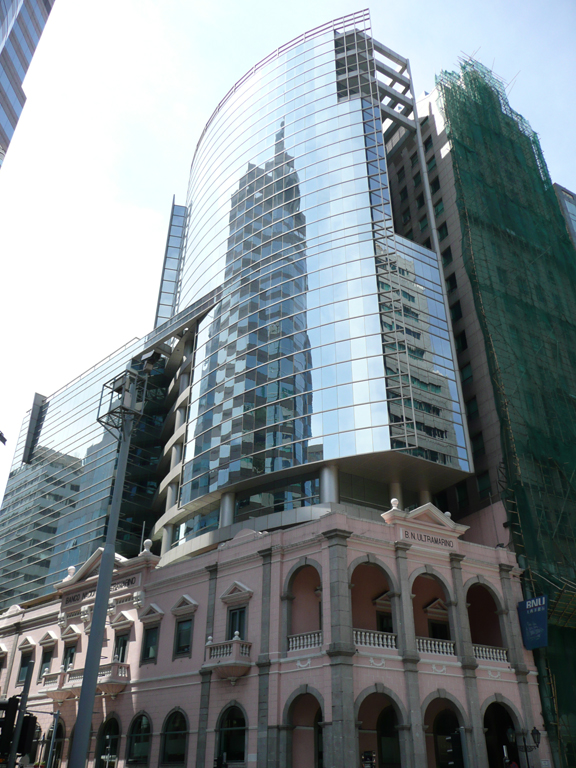
BNU Tower in Macau

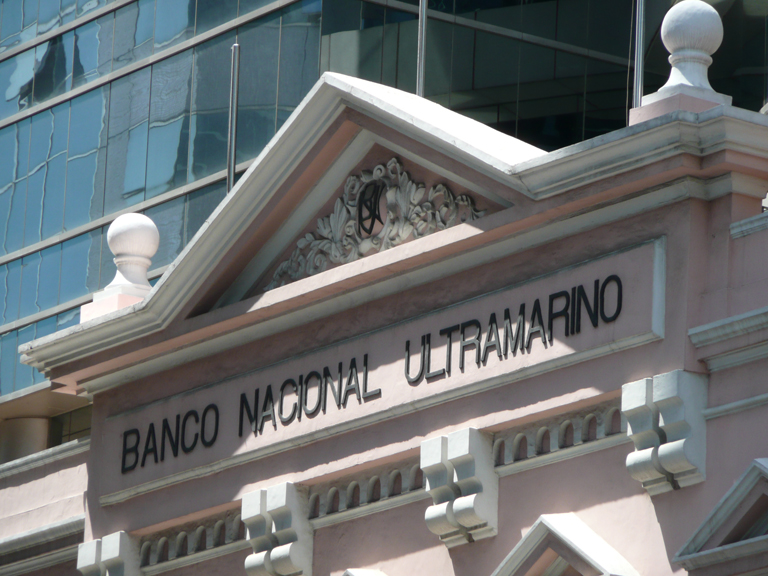
BNU Macau, detail

== Banknotes ==
MOP$100 banknotes issued by BNU

The Monetary Authority of Macao has authorized two banks to issue banknotes denominated in Macanese pataca, the Bank of China and Banco Nacional Ultramarino S.A., CGD's subsidiary in Macau. Owing to Macau's Portuguese colonial past, the languages on the banknotes feature Portuguese as well as Chinese.

The Banco Nacional Ultramarino introduced its first pataca notes in 1906, in denominations of 1, 5, 50 and 100 pataca. The next year it introduced 10 and 25 pataca notes. The BNU began to issue lower-value notes with 5, 10 and 50 avo notes in 1920, and 1 and 20 avo notes in 1942. In 1944, it introduced a 500 pataca note. After 1952, coins replaced denominations below 10 patacas. The bank discontinued the 25 pataca note in 1958.

Previous note designs included the coat of arms of Portugal; in the current issue BNU's corporate logo has replaced the coat of arms.

The current issue of BNU banknotes is:

Banco Nacional Ultramarino 2005 Series Banknote
Value	Dimensions	Color	Obverse	Reverse	Printed Date
MOP$10	138 × 69 mm	Yellow/Purple	Statue of Deusa A-Má of Macau	BNU building	August 8, 2005
MOP$20	143 × 71.5 mm	Violet	Macau International Airport	BNU building	August 8, 2005
MOP$50	148 × 74 mm	Brown	Sai Van Bridge	BNU building	August 8, 2009
MOP$100	153 × 76.5 mm	Blue	Senado Square	BNU building	August 8, 2005
MOP$500	158 × 79 mm	Green	Macau Tower	BNU building	August 8, 2005
MOP$1000	163 × 81.5 mm	Orange	Macao Cultural Centre	BNU building	August 8, 2005

The 2005 series of BNU was printed by Hong Kong Note Printing Limited – Hong Kong.

== See also ==
- Macanese pataca
- Mercantile Bank Holdings Limited
- Caixa Geral de Depósitos
