= Lisbon (Keith Fullerton Whitman album) =

Live album by Keith Fullerton Whitman
- Released: March 20, 2006
- Recorded: October 4, 2005
- Venue: Galeria Zé dos Bois (Lisbon, Portugal)
- Genre: Experimental
- Length: 41:41
- Label: Kranky

Keith Fullerton Whitman chronology
Twenty Two Minutes for Electric Guitar (2005)	Lisbon (2006)	Taking Away (2009)

Lisbon is a live album by American musician Keith Fullerton Whitman. It was released on March 20, 2006, through Kranky.

== Background ==
Keith Fullerton Whitman, also known as Hrvatski, is an American musician. Lisbon consists of a single 41-minute track. It was recorded on October 4, 2005, at Galeria Zé dos Bois in Lisbon, Portugal. In a 2006 interview, he said, "At the Lisbon show I used guitar, a bunch of small battery-powered Theremins, and a reel-to-reel tape of a synth improvisation recorded two months earlier." The album's artwork features photographs he took during the Lisbon trip.

The album was released on March 20, 2006, in Europe, and April 3, 2006, in North America, through Kranky.

== Critical reception ==
Professional ratings
Review scores
Source	Rating
AllMusic	4/5 stars
Pitchfork	8.6/10
PopMatters	5/10
Tiny Mix Tapes	4.5/5 stars

Tony Ware of XLR8R described the album as "the most intentionally direct, least studio-distilled and obsessed-over release of the tonal poet's catalogue." He added, "A dewy diffusion of sublime sine harmonic floes and granular gauze, Lisbon is an unhurried unfurling of muted melodies, proving an un-retouched glimpse into Whitman's arterial modus." Rob Theakston of AllMusic stated, "when it comes to experimental music, few do it better than Whitman." He added, "This is the embodiment of everything he's presented under his own name thus far, and the results couldn't be any more enjoyable."

=== Accolades ===
Accolades for Lisbon
Publication	List	Rank	Ref.
Cokemachineglow	Top 50 Albums 2006	10	
Cokemachineglow	Top 100 Albums of the 2000s	26	

== Track listing ==
Lisbon track listing
No.	Title	Length
1.	"Lisbon"	41:41
