= Caixa Geral de Depósitos =

Portuguese public banking institution

Coordinates: 38°45′44.40″N 9°05′55.00″W

Caixa Geral de Depósitos, S.A.
- Type: State-owned enterprise
- Industry: Banking
- Founded: 10 April 1876
- Headquarters: Avenida Dom João II, nº 1, Lisbon, Portugal
- Key people: Paulo Macedo (CEO)
- Total assets: €106,385 billions (Q2 2025)
- Owner: Government of Portugal (100%)
- Website: www.cgd.pt

Caixa Geral de Depósitos (CGD) (Portuguese pronunciation: [ˈkajʃɐ ʒɨˈɾal dɨ ðɨˈpɔzituʃ]) is a Portuguese state-owned banking corporation, and the largest bank in Portugal, established in Lisbon in 1876.

CGD now has presence in 23 countries spanning four continents through branches, representative offices or direct equity interests in local financial institutions. CGD is the largest Portuguese financial group, with the highest domestic market shares in key areas such as customer deposits, loans and advances to customers, mortgages, insurance, mutual funds and real estate leasing (11.4%). Based on assets, it ranks 109 in terms of the world's major banks. CGD is the 69th largest European bank.

CGD has been designated as a Significant Institution since the entry into force of European Banking Supervision in late 2014, and as a consequence is directly supervised by the European Central Bank.

== History ==
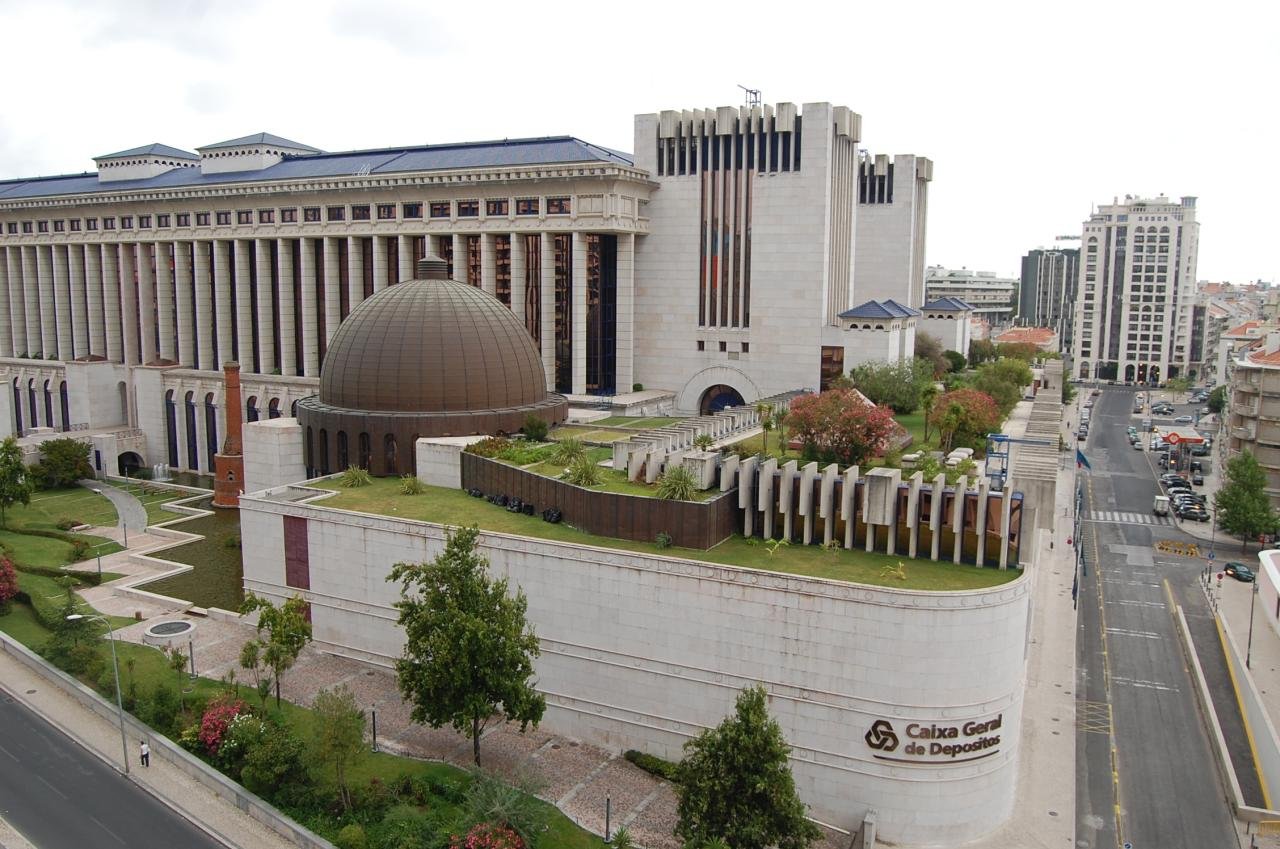
Caixa Geral de Depósitos' headquarters in Lisbon.

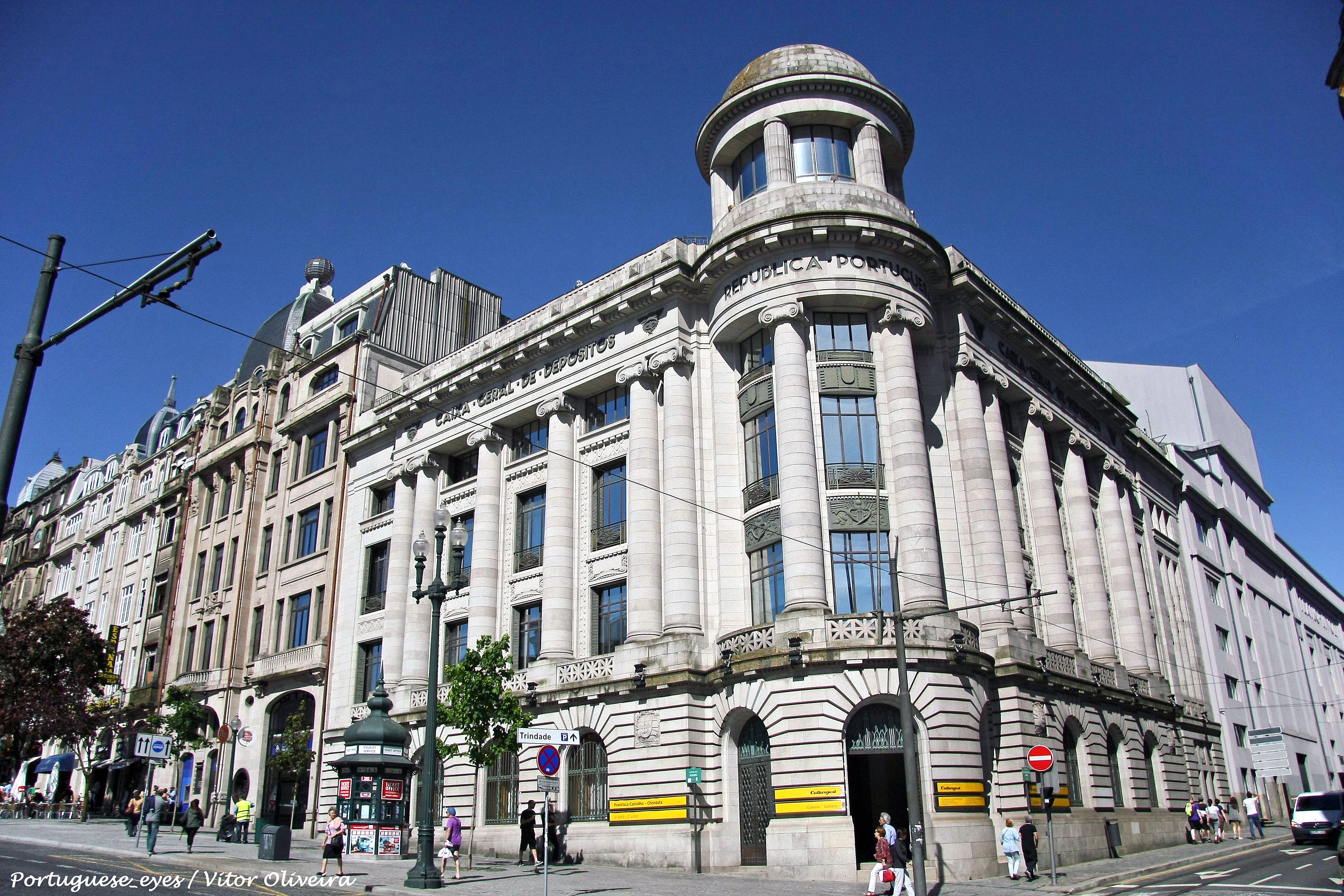
A Caixa Geral de Depósitos building in Porto.

- 1876 — Caixa Geral de Depósitos was founded under the aegis of the Junta de Crédito Público.
- 1880 — Caixa Económica Portuguesa was founded as a savings bank for Portugal's poorer classes.
- 1885 — The two Caixas merged.
- 1896 — CGD was spun off from the Junta de Crédito Público. This was followed by the creation of Caixa de Aposentações for wage earners and Monte de Piedade Nacional, a pawnbroking operation.
- 1918 — CGD developed general banking operations.
- 1924 — CGD acquired Banco Financial Português in Brazil.
- 1969 — CGD, a public service subject to the state's administrative rules, became a state-owned company.
- 1974 – CGD acquired a 5% stake in Banco Itaú when Itaú acquired Banco Português do Brasil, founded in 1918.
- 1975 — CGD established a branch in Paris.
- 1988 — CGD acquired Banco Nacional Ultramarino. With it, CGD got Ultramarino's ownership in several operations abroad, including Banco Internacional de São Tomé e Príncipe.
- 1991 — CGD acquired Banco de Extremadura in Spain and Chase Manhattan Bank España. Banco de Extramadura traces its origins back to 1939. In 1965, the name became Sánchez de Cáceres and in 1972 transformed into Banco de Extremadura. After CGD acquired it, Chase Manhattan Bank España became Banco Luso-Español.
- 1993 — CGD became an exclusively state-owned public company
- 1995 — CGD's acquired Banco Simeón, in Spain, from Banesto. Banco Simeón had been founded in 1857 in Vigo, Spain.
- 1997 — CGD established Banco Comercial e de Investimentos in Mozambique.
- 1998 — CGD acquired Banco Bandeirantes in Brazil, to which it transferred some accounts from Banco Financial Português. It also established a branch in Cape Verde, which in 1999 it converted to a subsidiary, Banco Interatlântico, of which it now owns 70%.
- 2000 — CGD acquired Banco Comercial do Atlântico, making the CGD Group the most important financial institution in Cape Verde. CGD also acquired the Mundial Confiança insurance company and Banco Totta & Comercial Sotto Mayor de Investimento, which it later renamed Caixa-Banco de Investimento. CGD acquired majority control of Banco Internacional de São Tomé e Príncipe. CGD sold Banco Bandeirantes to Brazil's Unibanco in return for a 12% share in Unibanco. At the time, CGD held a 4.6% stake in Banco Itaú, which it was forced to give up under conflict of interest rules.
- 2001 — CGD opened a branch in Dili, East Timor. CGD also merged in Banco Nacional Ultramarino, effectively ending its separate existence, though the name survives in CGD's subsidiary in Macau. Lastly, CGD merged Banco Franco-Português into its Paris branch.
- 2002 — CGD combined its three commercial banks in Spain: Banco Luso-Español, Banco de Extremadura, and Banco Simeón, into one bank under the Banco Simeón name.
- 2004 — CGD took a controlling interest of 91% in the South African bank holding company, Mercantile Lisbon Bank Holdings Limited (MLBH) (now known as Mercantile Bank Holdings Limited) .
- 2005 — The alliance between CGD and Unibanco dissolved, with CGD selling its shares.
- 2006 — Banco Simeón changed its name to Banco Caixa Geral.
- 2008 — On 28 February, the Central Bank of Brazil authorized CGD to set up Banco Caixa Geral-Brasil in Brazil.
- 2009 — During the Euro area crisis, CGD was a target to several rescue aid initiatives granted to the bank in distress by the Portuguese government.
- 2012 — European Commission approved the recapitalisation of the bank by the Portuguese government
- 2016 — In July, amidst an impending crisis which included the resignation of the board of directors and the preparation of another government bailout, CGD announced that it was going to cut 2,500 jobs between 2017 and 2020, through early retirement and mutual agreement.

== Business units ==
CGD engages in, inter alia, retail banking, commercial banking, investment banking and venture capital, asset management, specialised credit, and insurance

=== Retail banking ===
Consumer finance, mortgage lending, credit cards, and deposits to individuals, businessmen, and micro companies

=== Commercial banking ===
Loans, current accounts, investment project financing, discounting bills, venture capital, factoring, equipment and property leasing, syndicated loans, underwriting services to large companies, small and medium enterprises, and the government sector

=== Corporate finance ===
Acquisitions, mergers, restructuring, privatizations, subscription and placement of securities, securitization, preparation and organization of syndicated loans, investment management, financial analysis of markets and companies, and advisory services

=== Trading and sales segment ===
Management of the securities portfolio and issued debt instruments; and money and foreign exchange markets, repo and security loan, and wholesale brokerage operations, as well as offers derivative instruments, and loans and advances to other credit institutions

=== Insurance ===
Various life and non-life insurance products

=== Asset management ===
Open or closed unit trust and property funds, and wealth management funds

== International operations ==
Caixa operates internationally through a variety of branches, affiliates, and subsidiaries

=== Africa ===
- Angola - 50% of Banco para Promoção e Desenvolvimento (joint venture with Sonangol)
- Cape Verde — Subsidiaries: Banco Comercial do Atlântico and Banco Interatlântico
- Mozambique — BCI Fomento and Banco Nacional de Investimento (BNI)
- São Tomé and Príncipe — Banco Internacional de São Tomé e Príncipe (BISTP)
- South Africa — Mercantile Bank Ltd

=== Europe ===
- Brussels, Belgium — Representative office
- Paris, France — Branch
- Berlin, Germany — Representative office
- Spain — CGD has a subsidiary, Banco Caixa Geral, headquartered in Vigo, and a branch of the parent in Madrid.
- London, United Kingdom - Representative office

=== Americas ===
- Brazil — Banco Caixa Geral Brasil
  - São Paulo — Representative office
- Cayman Islands, Caribbean — Branch
- Mexico City, Mexico — Representative office
- Canada, Toronto - Representative office

=== Asia ===
- PR China — Branch in Zhuhai (Guangdong)
- East Timor — Ten branches in Dili and the other districts of East Timor
- India — Representative offices in Mumbai and Pangim (Goa)
- Macau (special administrative region of PR China) — Banco Nacional Ultramarino and an offshore subsidiary

== See also ==
- List of banks in the euro area
- List of banks in Portugal
