= Monetary Authority of Macao =

Regional central bank of Macau, China

Monetary Authority of Macao: 澳門金融管理局; Autoridade Monetária de Macau

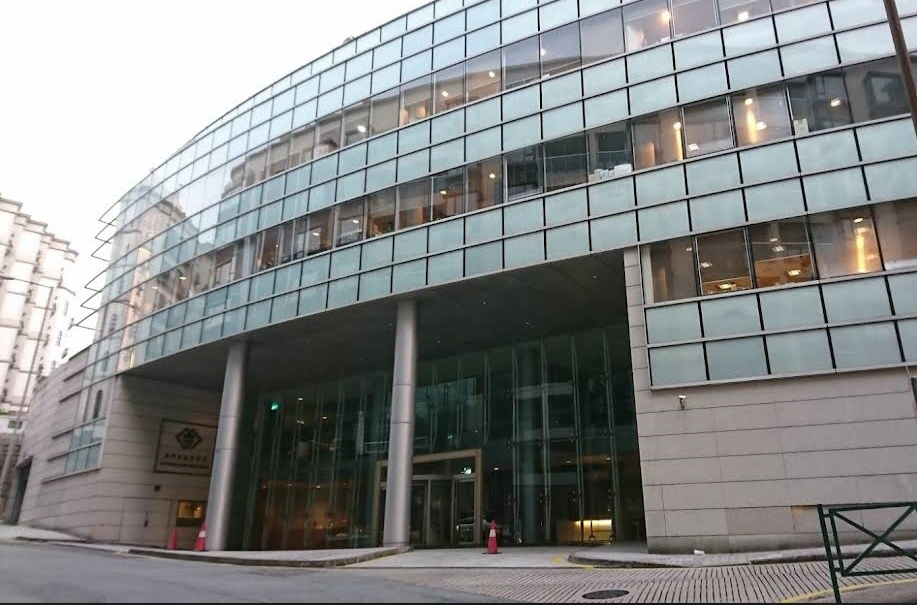
- Headquarters: Calçada do Gaio, n.os 24 e 26, Macau
- Established: December 20, 1999
- Ownership: Government of Macao SAR
- Chairman: Simon, Vong Sin Man (黃善文)
- Currency: Macanese pataca MOP (ISO 4217)
- Reserves: $28.45 billion
- Website: amcm.gov.mo

Monetary Authority of Macao

Chinese name
- Traditional Chinese: 澳門金融管理局
- Simplified Chinese: 澳门金融管理局
Transcriptions
Standard Mandarin
- Hanyu Pinyin: Àomén Jīnróng Guǎnlǐ jú
Yue: Cantonese
- Jyutping: ou3 mun4*2 gam1 jung4 gun2 lei5 guk6

Portuguese name
- Portuguese: Autoridade Monetária de Macau

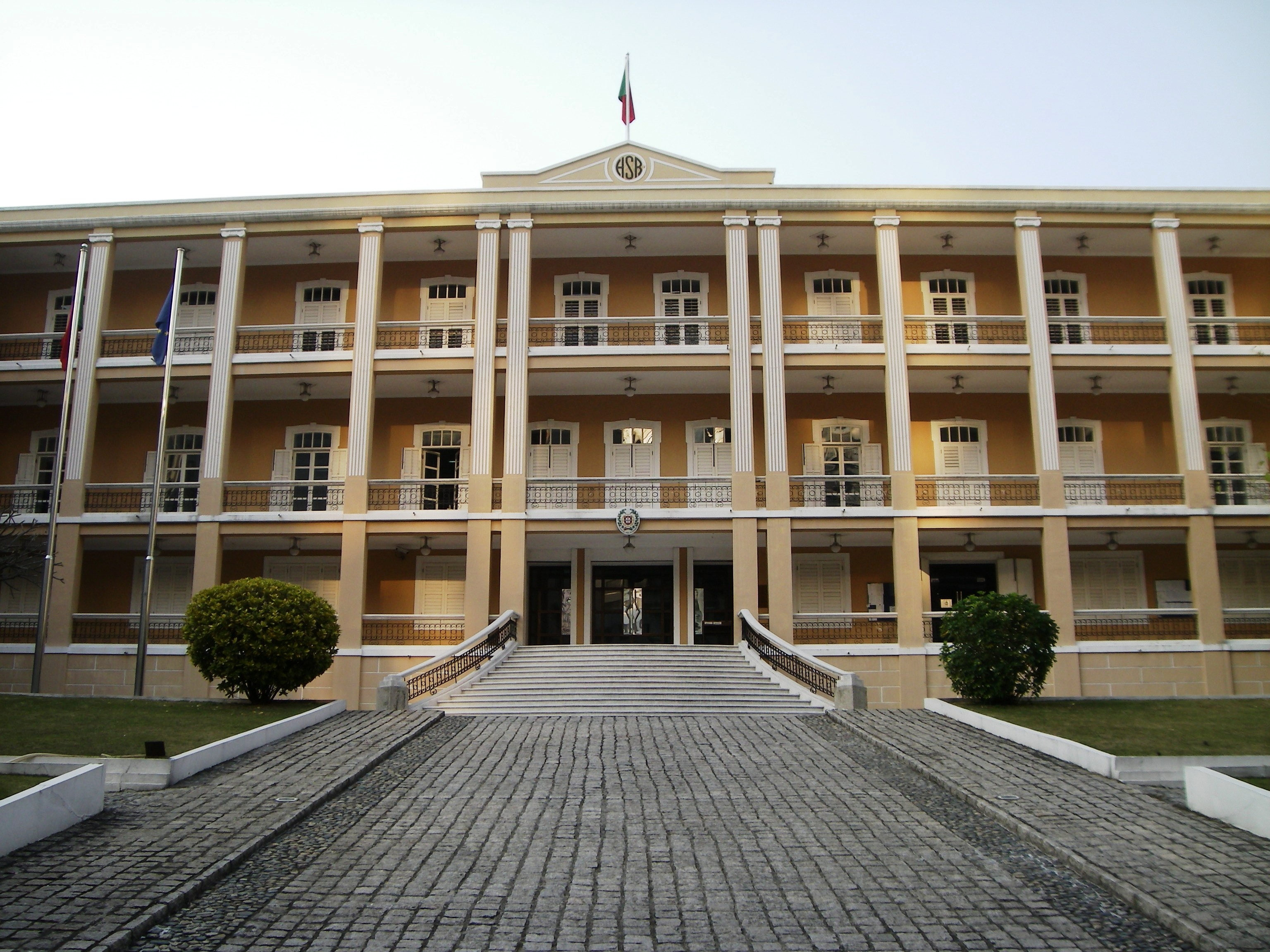
Former offices of the Monetary and Foreign Exchange Authority of Macau at 45 Rua Pedro Nolasco da Silva, now the Portuguese Consulate General in Macau

The Monetary Authority of Macao (Chinese: 澳門金融管理局; Portuguese: Autoridade Monetária de Macau, AMCM) is the currency board and the de facto central bank of Macau. The regulatory institution was established on December 20, 1999, upon the transfer of sovereignty over Macau from Portugal to the People's Republic of China as the Macau Special Administrative Region.

== History ==
It was formerly known as the "Monetary and Foreign Exchange Authority of Macao" (Portuguese: Autoridade Monetaria e Cambial de Macau, AMCM), which was established on 1 July 1989.

According to Decree-law No. 14/96/M of 11 March, the Monetary Authority of Macao carries the following major statutory duties:

- To advise and assist the Chief Executive in formulating and applying monetary, financial, exchange rate and insurance policies;
- To guide, co-ordinate and oversee the monetary, financial, foreign exchange and insurance markets, ensure their smooth operation and supervise the actions of those operating within them according to the terms established in the regulatory statutes governing each respective area;
- To monitor internal monetary stability and the external solvency of the local currency, ensuring its full convertibility;
- To exercise the functions of a central monetary depository and manage the territory's currency reserves and other foreign assets;
- To monitor the stability of the financial system.

== Offices ==
The head offices in order:

- 6 Avenida da República
- Avenida Sidónio Pais, which later housed the Macau Polytechnic Institute
- St. Raphael Hospital (built 1939), served as the head office from 1990 to 1999 - now Consulate-General of the Portuguese Republic in Macao
  - The head office at 45 Rua Pedro Nolasco da Silva opened on 26 September 1991.
- Current: 24-26 Calçada do Gaio, São Lázaro (and the former Convent of the Precious Blood or Convento do Precioso Sangue) 1999–present - next to Escola Leng Nam

== Chairman ==
- Anselmo Teng (丁連星)
- Chan Sau San (陳守信)

== See also ==
- Macanese pataca
- Economy of Macau
- Hong Kong Monetary Authority
- List of central banks
- List of financial supervisory authorities by country
