= French denier =

Medieval coin

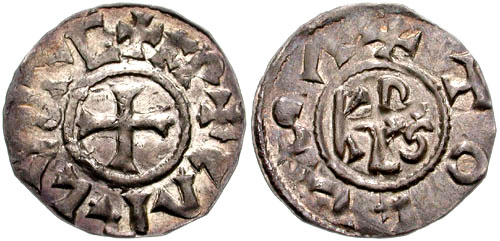
Denier of Charlemagne. AD 768–814. 21mm, 1.19 g, Toulouse mint

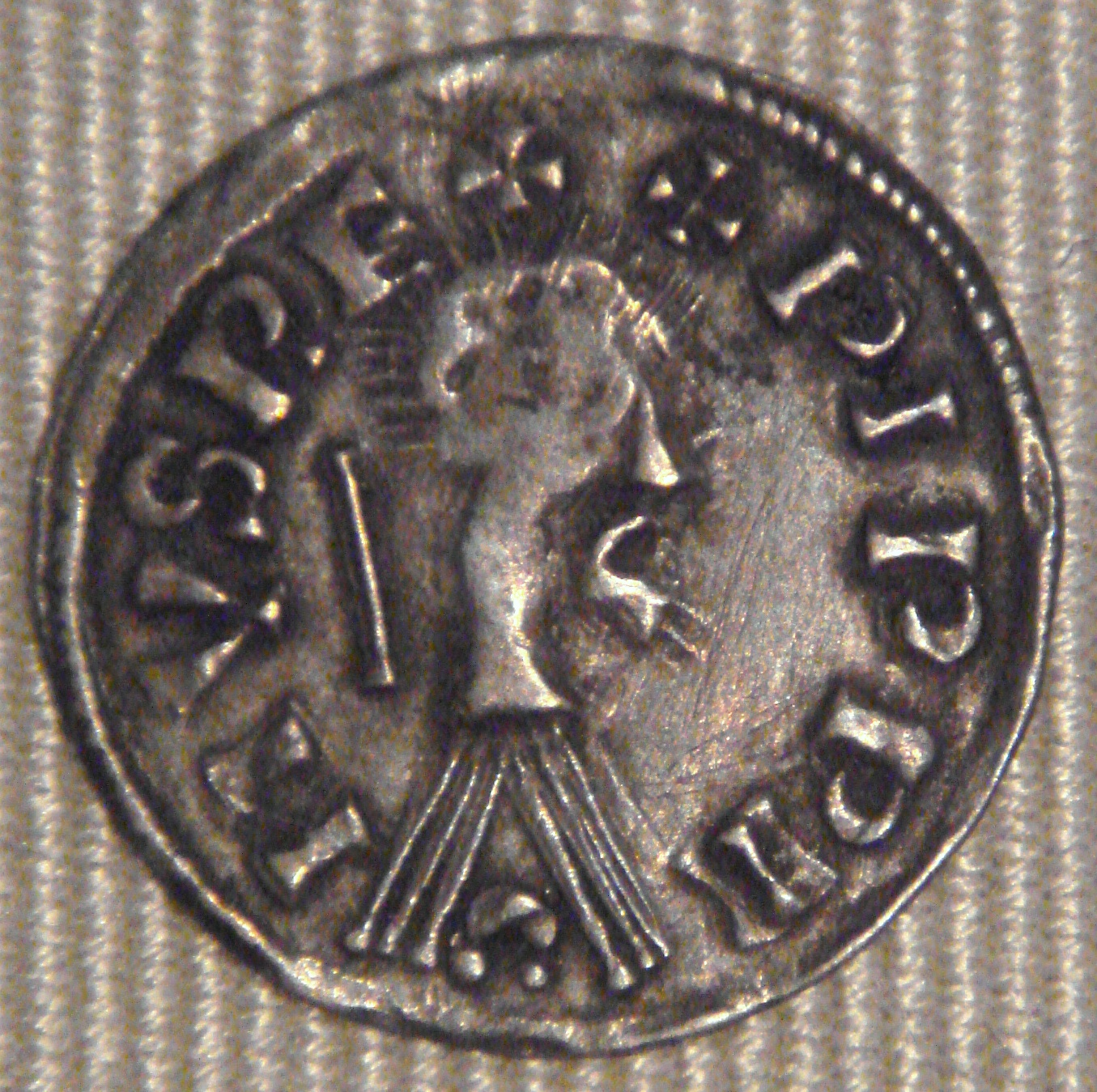
Denier of Pepin I of Aquitaine 817–838

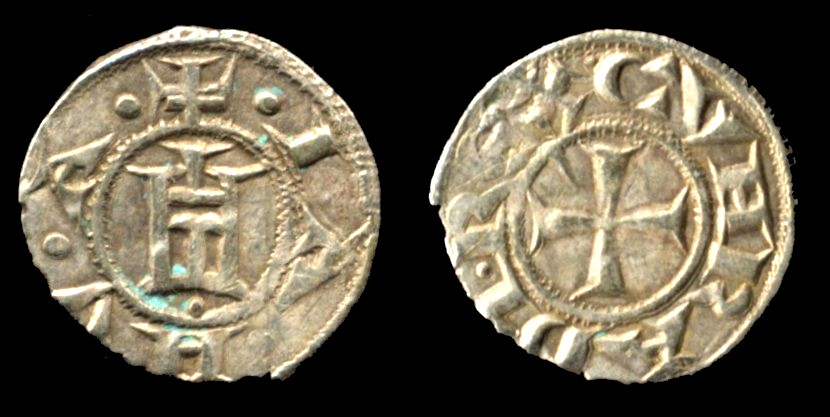
Denier of the Republic of Genoa (1139–1339)

The denier (/dəˈnɪər/; Latin: denarius, Italian: denaro, Greek: δηνάριο, romanized: dinario; abbr. d.) or penny was a medieval coin which takes its name from the Frankish coin first issued in the late seventh century; in English it is sometimes referred to as a silver penny. The appearance of the penny represents the end of gold coinage, which, at the start of Frankish rule, had either been Roman (Byzantine) or "pseudo-imperial" (minted by the Franks in imitation of Byzantine coinage). Silver would be the basis for Frankish coinage from then on. The denier was minted in France, Cyprus and parts of the Italian peninsula for the whole of the Middle Ages, in states such as the patriarchate of Aquileia, the Kingdom of Sicily, the Republic of Genoa, the Republic of Siena, Kingdom of Cyprus, and the crusader state Kingdom of Jerusalem, among others.

== History ==
=== Coin ===
Around 755, amid the Carolingian Reforms, Pepin the Short introduced a new currency system which was eventually adjusted so that 12 pence (Latin: denarii; French: deniers) equaled one shilling (solidi; sols or sous) and 20 shillings equaled one pound (libra, librae, or lirae; livres). Later, three deniers equaled one liard. Only the denier was an actual coin; the rest were money of account. This system and the denier itself served as the model for many of Europe's currencies, including sterling, the Italian lira, the Spanish dinero and the Portuguese dinheiro.

=== Interest rates ===
In Ancien Régime France, the denier was used as a notional measure of interest rates on loans. Thus, a rate of 4% (1/25) would be expressed as "denier 25"; a rate of 5% (1/20) as "denier 20"; and so forth.

== See also ==
- denarius
- dinar
- dinero
- penny
- pfennig
- Treasure of Imphy
