= Cornado =

Type of Castilian coin (13th-16th c.)

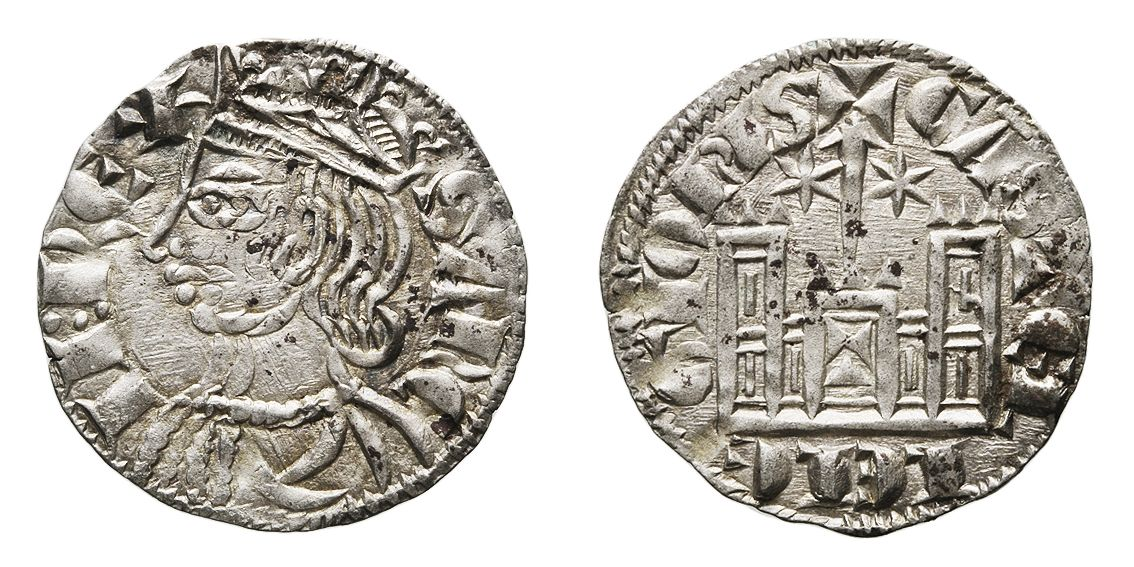
Cornado minted in Toledo during the reign of Sancho IV of Castile (1284–1295)

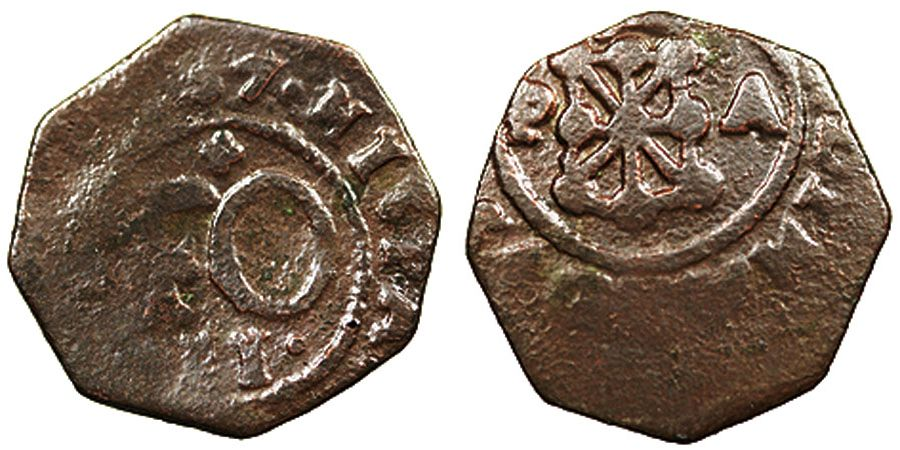
Navarran cornado minted in 1757, during the reign of Ferdinand VI

Cornado is the common name of several Castilian coins made of copper or billon (an alloy of silver and copper), minted from the time of Sancho IV of Castile (13th century) until that of the Catholic Monarchs (16th century).

The name cornado was derived from the fact that the coin's obverse depicted the crowned head of the king.

In 1286, ten cornados were equivalent to one maravedí, and eight cornados to a sueldo. Later versions were coined with a lower alloy quality. This led to the proverb no vale un cornado, equivalent to the English expression "not worth a farthing".
