= Gustave de Ponton d'Amécourt =

French inventor, archaeologist, and numismatist

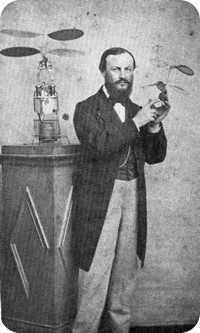
- With his beloved propeller in 1863, by photographer Nadar
- Born: August 16, 1825
- Died: January 20, 1888 (aged 62); Trilport
- Occupations: Archaeologist; Numismatist
- Spouse: Anne-Marie Dumont de Signéville

Gustave de Ponton d'Amécourt (16 August 1825 – 20 January 1888, Trilport, France) was a French inventor, archaeologist, and numismatist. He coined the term "helicopter" and invented one of the first prototypes.

== Biography ==
Gustave de Ponton d'Amécourt hailed from an ancient bourgeois family bearing the surname Ponthon. The lineage traced back to Augustin de Ponton (1736–1808), a commissioner of the Navy and later inspector general of the king's farms, who married Louise Maille in 1768. His parents were Jean-Baptiste de Ponton and Louise Machet de La Martinière.

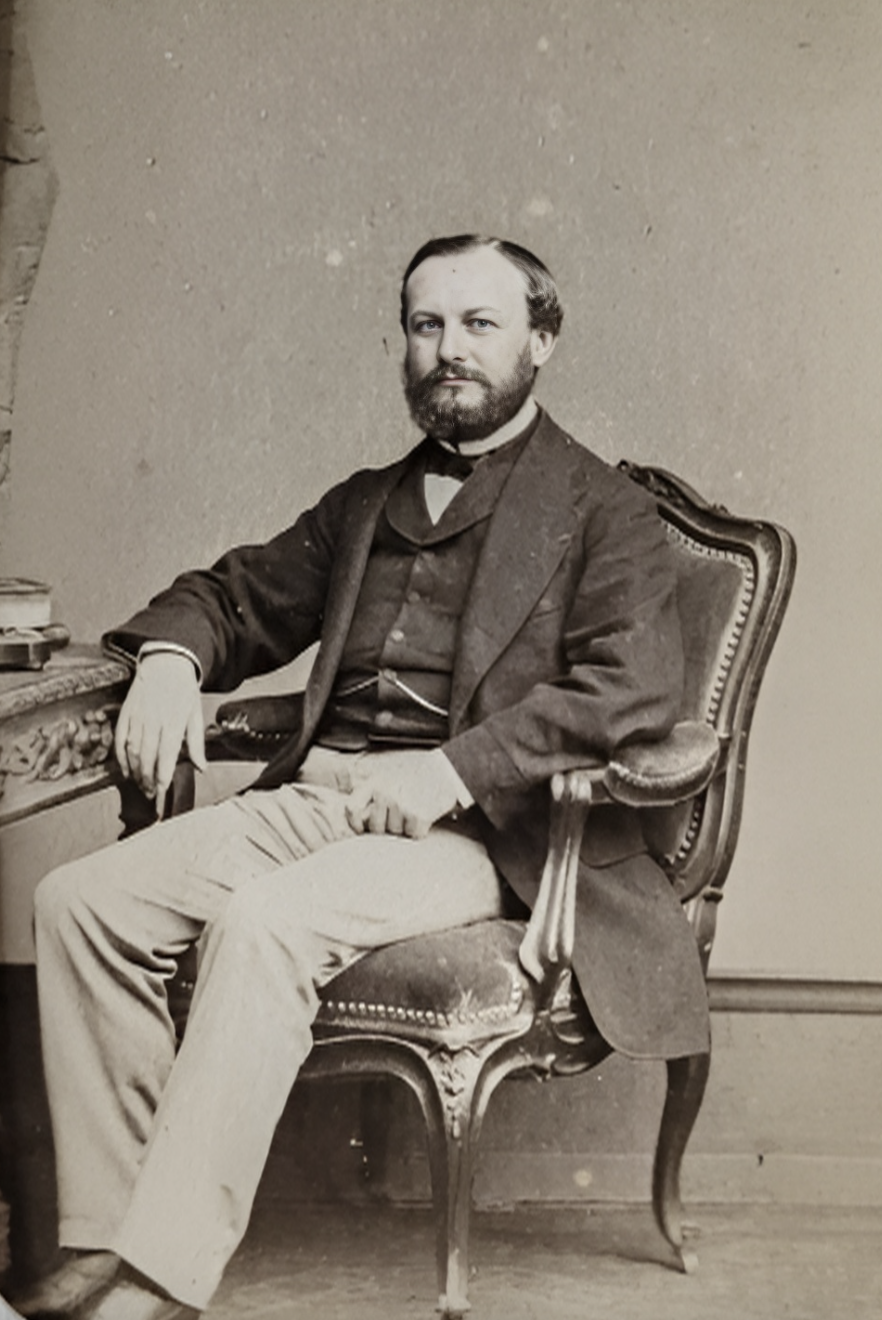
Viscount Gustave de Ponton d'Amecourt

Gustave de Ponton d'Amécourt was the son of Antoine de Ponton d'Amécourt, an officer, and Marie Élisabeth Madeleine Collette de Baudicour. He married Anne-Marie Dumont de Signéville, daughter of François Dumont de Signéville and Victoire Haudos de Possesse.

=== Numismatics ===
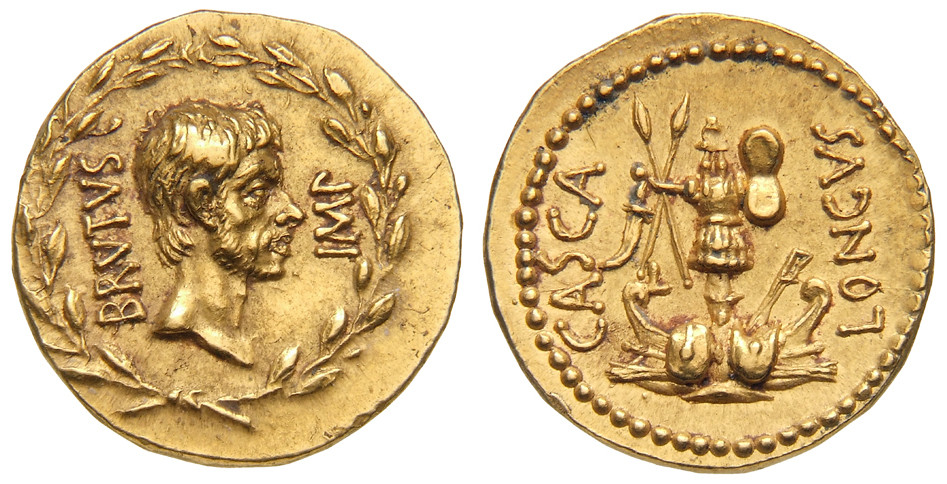
Some of the coins that were in Gustave d'Amecourt's collection.

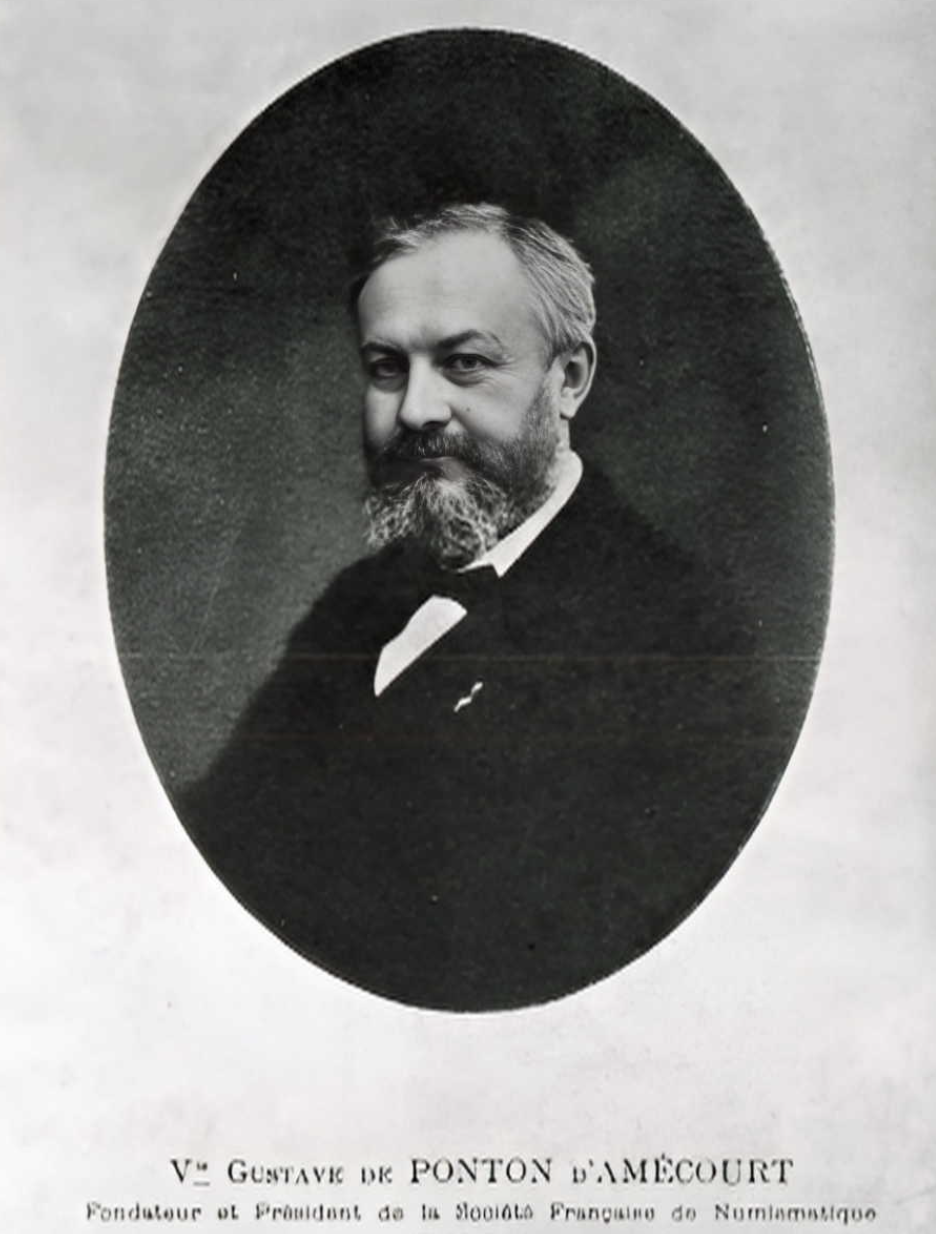
Gustave de Ponton d'Amecourt Founder of the French Society of Numismatics

Gustave de Ponton d'Amécourt, an erudite who studied mathematics, Sanskrit, Greek, and Latin, was a numismatist and archaeologist. He founded the French Numismatic Society and became its first president in 1865. Notably, he conducted extensive studies on Merovingian coins delivered to the Historical and Archaeological Society of Maine, of which he was a member. In 1857, he acquired the treasure of Imphy, consisting of around a hundred Carolingian deniers. In 1886, his numismatic collections were sold, and in 1881, a collection of 1,131 Merovingian coins was acquired by the Cabinet des Médailles of the Bibliothèque nationale de France.

=== Aeronautics ===
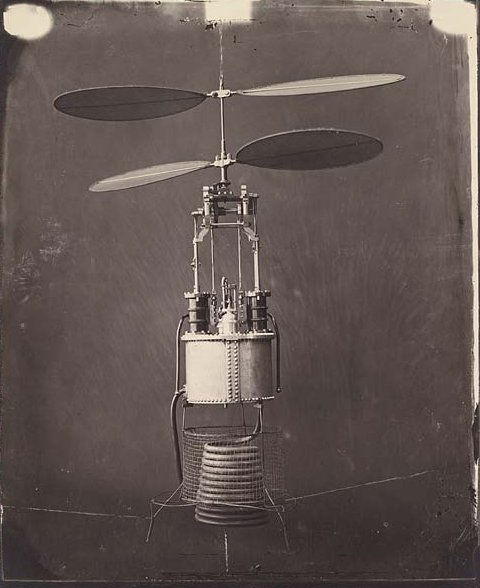
The chère hélice, photographed by Nadar in 1863.

He successfully invented one of the first prototypes of a helicopter by designing his "dear propeller" in 1861, with his friend Gabriel de La Landelle, an experimental small prototype of a "heavier-than-air" aerostat with counter-rotating rotor with two coaxial aerial propellers, and a bicarbonate steam engine (whose boiler was one of the first uses of aluminum), inspired, among other things, by the aerial screw and the ornithopter from Leonardo da Vinci's manuscripts of the 1480s, the Chinese bamboo-copter of the 4th century, and their early study prototypes of aerial propeller, the "spiralifers".

He coined the term "helicopter" from the ancient Greek έλιξ, έλικος or 'helix' ("spiral", "propeller") and πτερὸν or 'pteron' ("wing"). This term first appeared on 3 August 1861 in a patent application in the United Kingdom, then on 16 April 1862 in an additional certificate to patent 49,077 originally filed on 3 April 1861 in France, which only mentioned the term "aircraft". By analogy with the word "navigation", he also coined with Gabriel de La Landelle the word "aviation", "derived from the verb 'avier', synonymous with flying in the air."

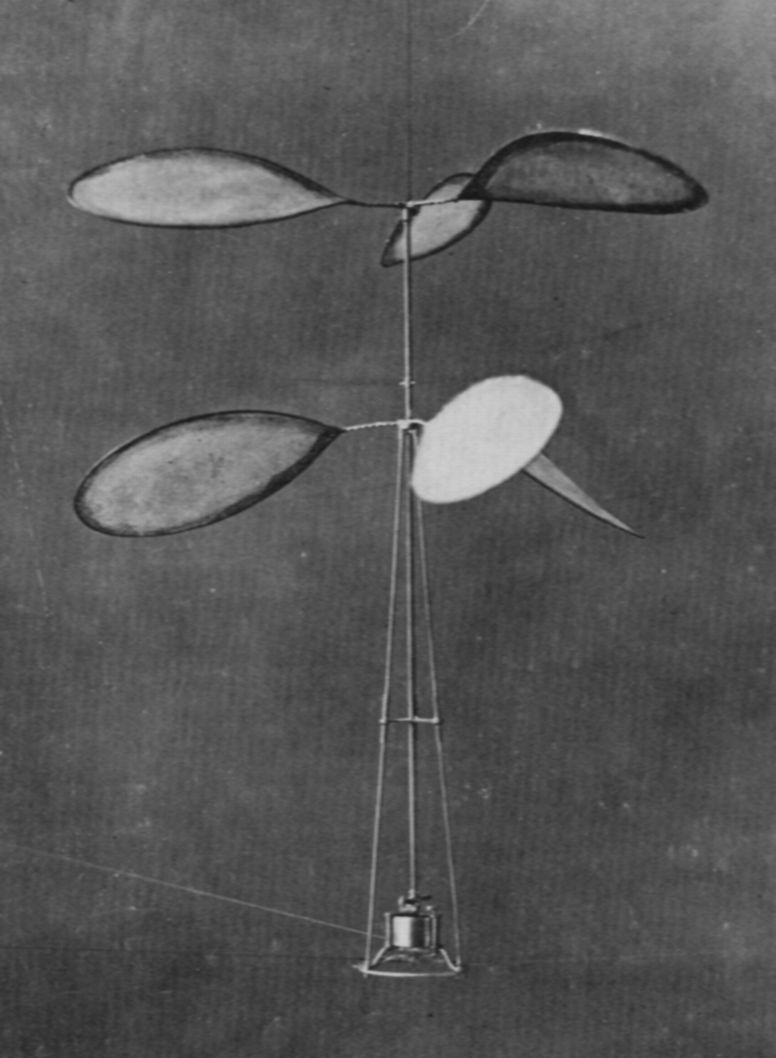
Prototypes of aerial propellers spiralifers.

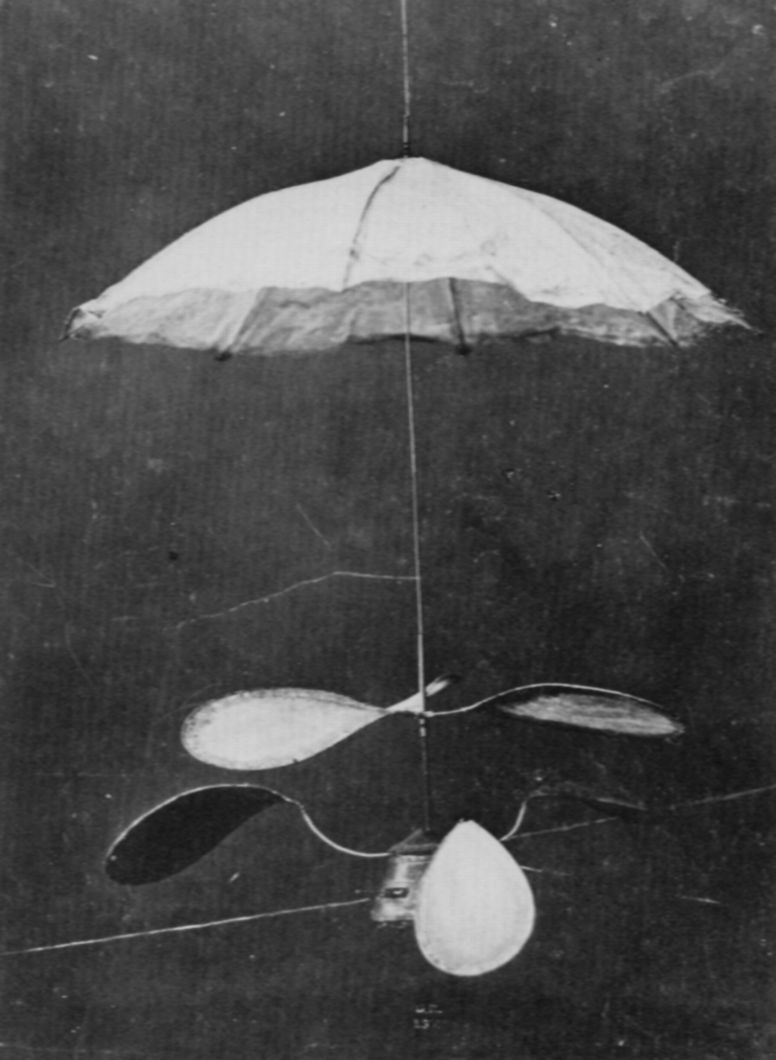
Spiralifer propeller prototypes with parachutes.

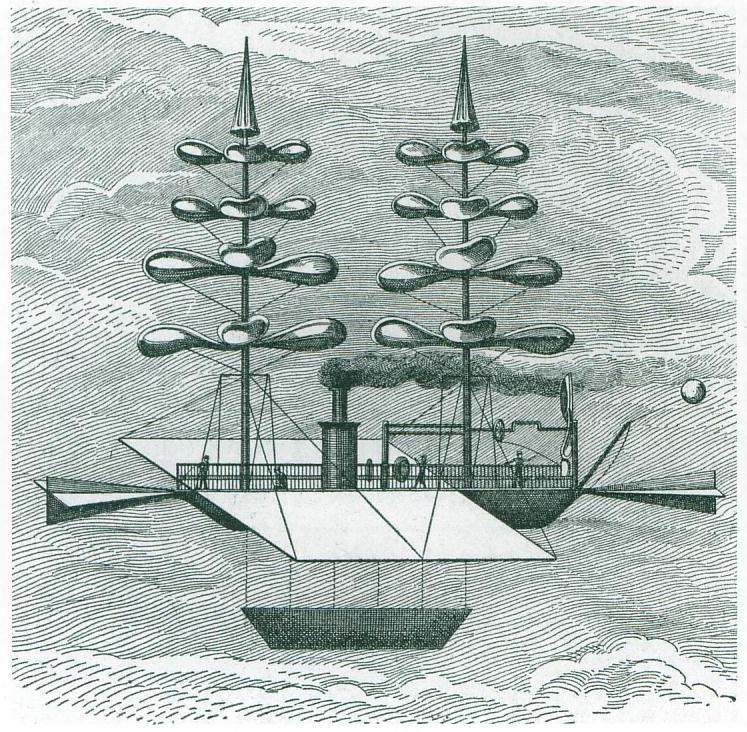
Imaginary helicopter ship by Guillaume Joseph Gabriel de La Landelle (1863).

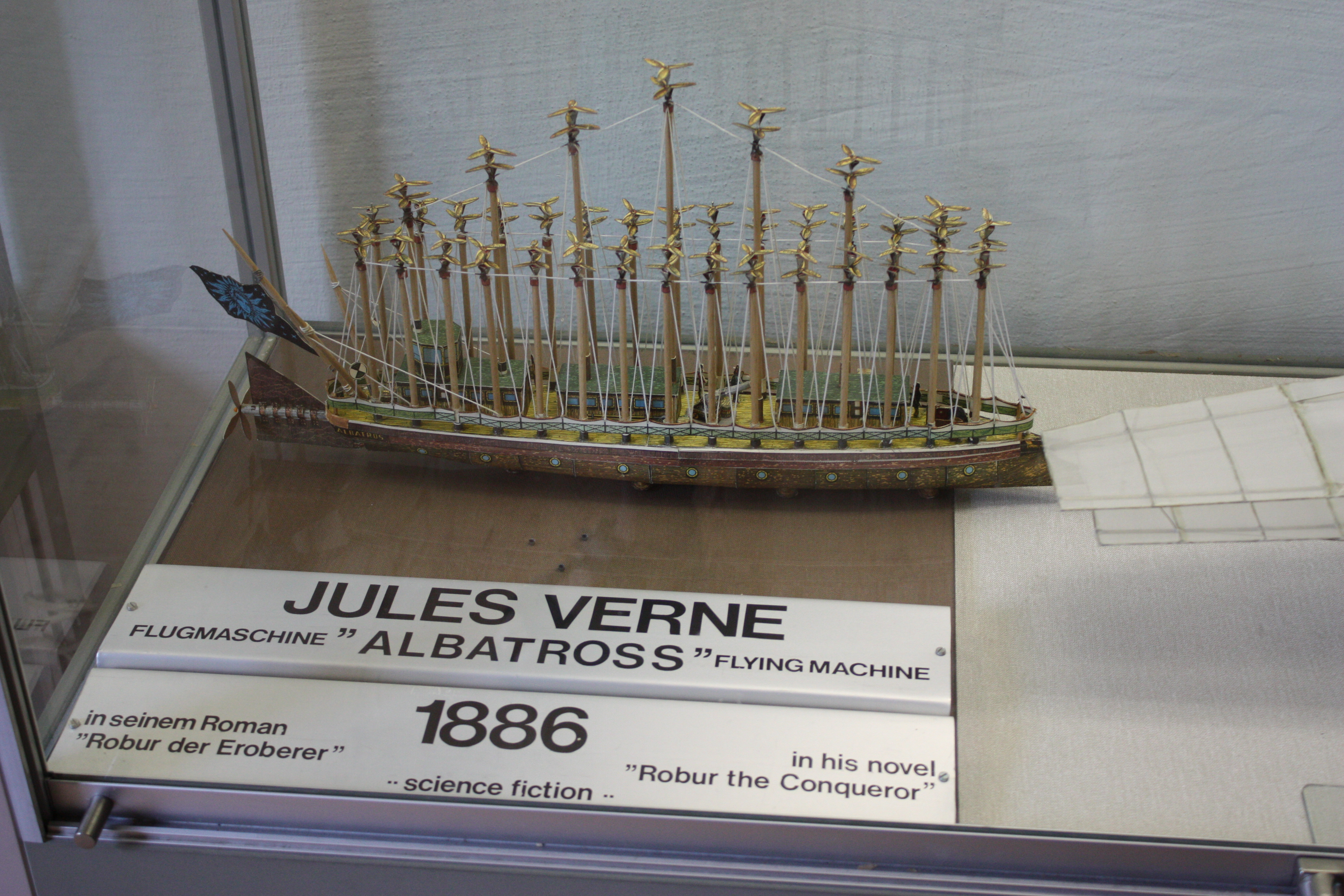
The Albatros, an imaginary flying ship from the science fiction novel Robur the Conqueror by Jules Verne (1886).

The device was photographed by their friend Nadar in 1863 (a pioneer of aerial photography in 1858). Together, they founded the society for the encouragement of aerial locomotion by means heavier than air, in Paris, in 1863, with their famous visionary novelist friend Jules Verne, who drew inspiration from this invention to create the imaginary flying ship albatross of 30 meters long, for 37 masts, propelled by 74 double aerial propellers with electric motors and two electric motors with front and rear propellers, for his science fiction novel Robur the Conqueror of 1886 (followed by Master of the World of 1904). The "dear propeller" contributed to the progress of future aircraft propulsion.

== Distinctions ==
- Knight of the Legion of Honour (15 August 1868)
- Knight of the Order of Saint Gregory the Great (Vatican)
- Knight of the Order of Christ (Portugal)

=== Legacy ===
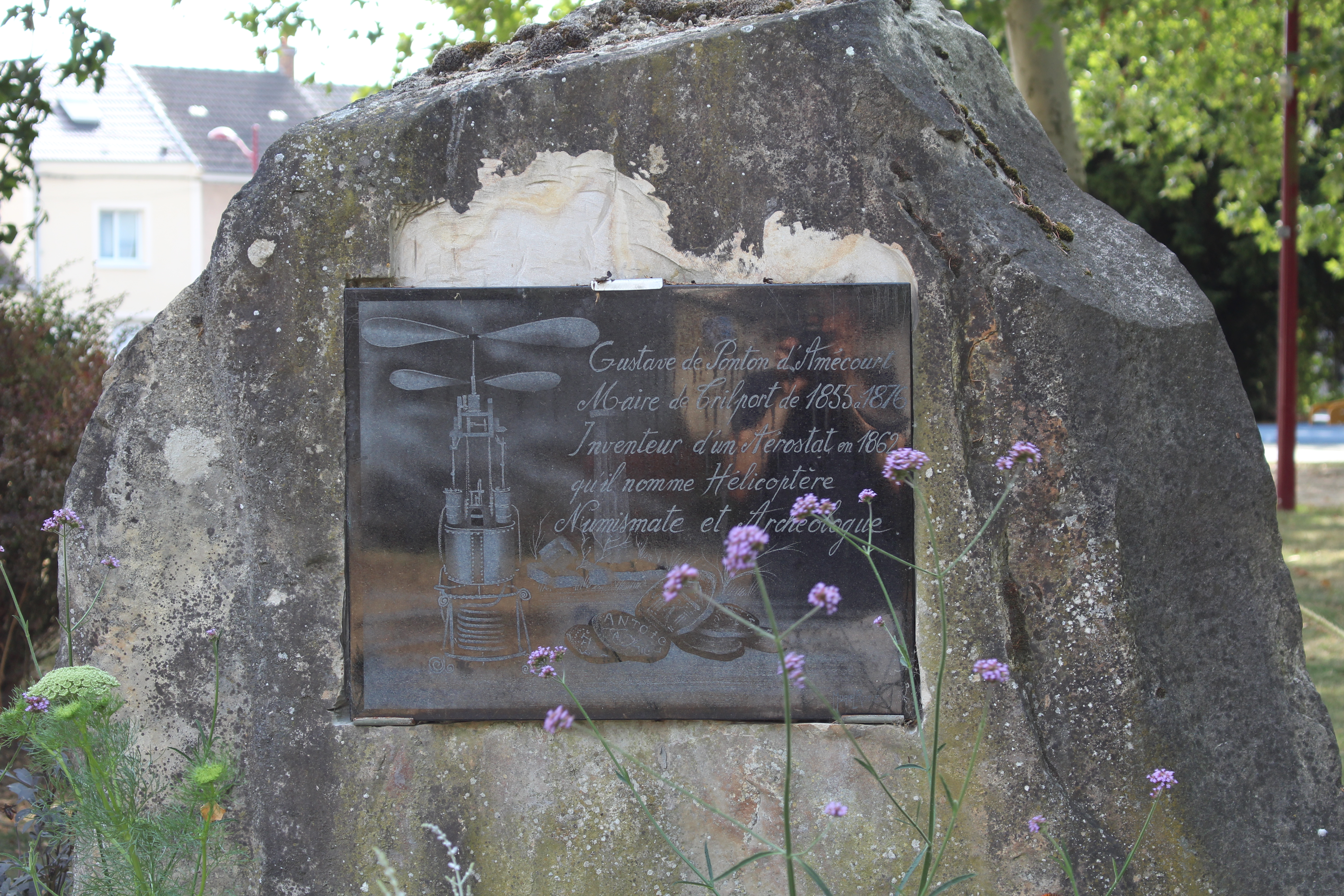
Memorial to Gustave d'Amecourt in Trilport

A commemorative stele is erected in the park of the commune of Trilport near Paris, where he served as mayor from 1855 to 1876.

== See also ==
- Helicopter
- History of aviation
- Timeline of aviation

== Bibliography ==
- Gustave de Ponton d'Amécourt, "Les monnaies mérovingiennes du Cénomannicum," in the Revue Historique et Archéologique du Maine, Le Mans, 1881–1882, volumes X, XI, and XII.
- Vte De Ponton d'Amécourt, La conquête de l'air par l'hélice, Chez tous les libraires, Paris, 1863.
