= Treasure of Imphy =

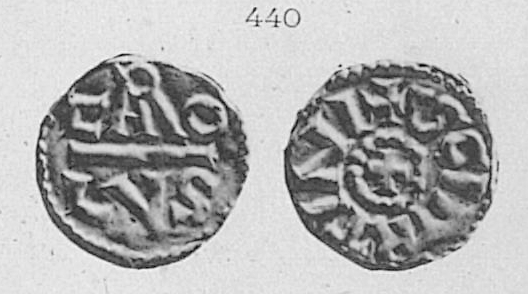
Denier of 775 AD

The Treasure of Imphy is a collection of one hundred Carolingian coins discovered by chance in 1857 in the town of Imphy in Nièvre, France. The coins, all silver French deniers, were purchased by Gustave de Ponton d'Amécourt, and were preserved. Their study contributed to the knowledge of the coinage of the period.

The coins were discovered when workers were installing drainage pipes. At that time, the workers discovered an earthen pot containing the hundred coins. The discovery was properly reported and the coins were studied by Adrien Prévost de Longpérier. The collection was then bought by Gustave de Ponton d'Amécourt, founder of the French Numismatic Society.
