= Moidore =

Historic Portuguese gold coin

A moidore or moydore was historically a gold coin of Portuguese origin. While the coin shows a face value of 4,000 réis, its real value was 20% higher or 4,800 réis from 1688 to 1800. On its obverse is the face value and the Portuguese coat of arms, and on its reverse is the Order of Christ Cross. Moidores were minted from 1677 to as late as 1910, mainly in the Kingdom of Portugal and in Portuguese colonies like Brazil and Mozambique. Gold coins were also issued in fractions or multiples of moidores, ranging from one-tenth of a moidore to five moidores.

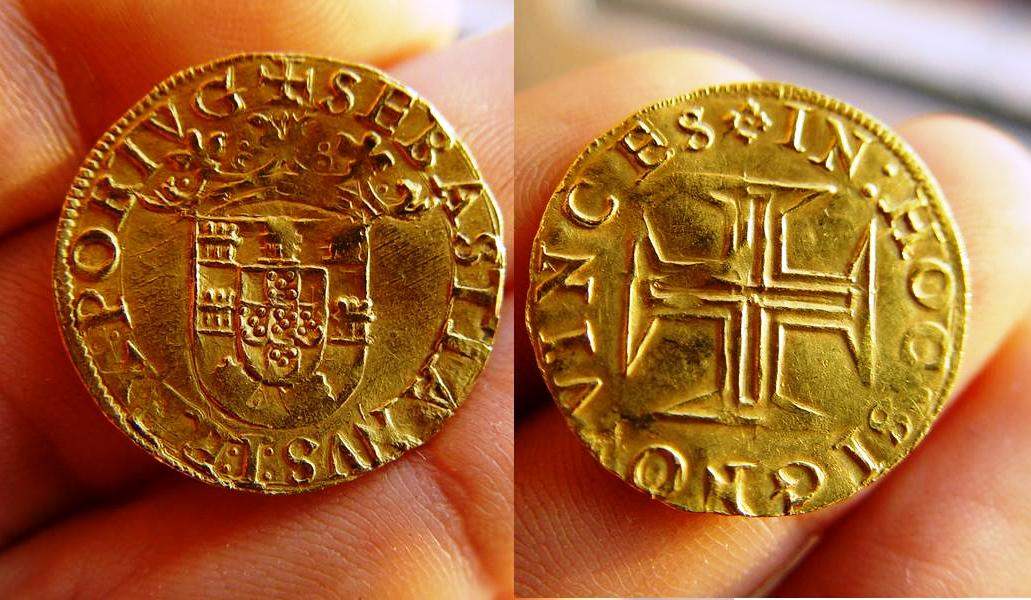
An example of a Portuguese 500-réis gold coin of King Sebastian of Portugal (r. 1557–1578)

The real (meaning "royal", plural: réis or [archaic] reais) was the currency unit of Portugal from around 1430 until 1911, when the First Portuguese Republic introduced the escudo following the 1910 Republican Revolution.

Since the Portuguese Empire (1415–1999) spread throughout a vast number of territories that are now part of 53 different sovereign states, moidores served as currency not only in those regions but also in other regions of the globe, including Western Europe and the West Indies.

== Etymology ==
The word moidore is a loanword from the Portuguese "moeda de ouro", literally meaning "gold coin".

== England and her colonies ==
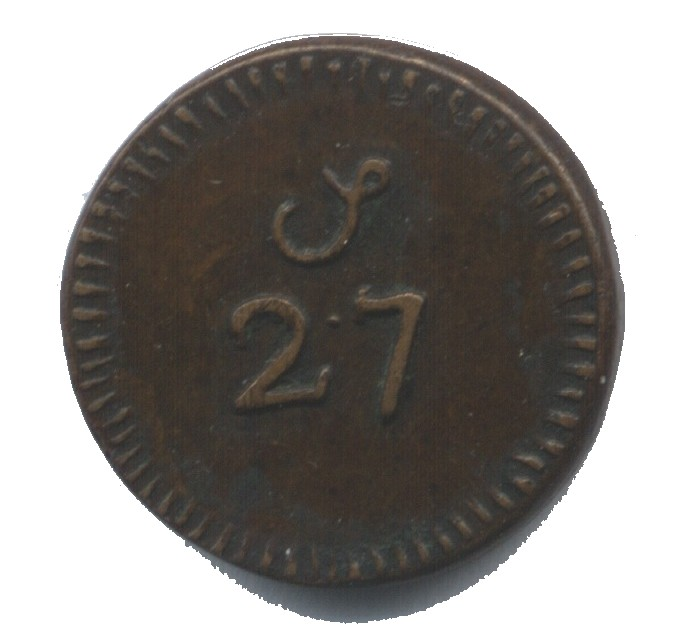
A coin weight for a moidore, indicating a sterling value of 27 shillings

Moidores circulated widely in England and her colonies, although the coin colloquially known as the moidore was in fact the double moidore. It was the principal coin current in Ireland at the beginning of the 18th century, and spread to the west of England. The single moidore was generally assigned a sterling value of about 13 shillings 5 1/2 pence, and the double moidore one of about 27 shillings, or in Ireland 30 shillings.

== Literary references ==
Daniel Defoe's Robinson Crusoe (1719) contains numerous references to moidores: e.g., "I am persuaded, that by the improvements I had made in that little time I lived there, and the increase I should probably have made if I had stayed, I might have been worth a hundred thousand moidores"; "the old man let me see, that he was debtor to me four hundred and seventy moidores of gold"; "the value of plantation increasing, amounted to 38892 crusadoes, which made 3241 moidores"; and "he sent me on board a present of fresh provisions, wine, and sweetmeats, worth above thirty moidores".

In the second part of Jonathan Swift's Gulliver's Travels (1726), when Lemuel Gulliver reaches Brobdingnag, a land of giants, the Queen of that country offers to buy him from the farmer who first finds him: "He [the farmer], who apprehended I could not live a month, was ready enough to part with me, and demanded a thousand pieces of gold, which were ordered him on the spot, each piece being about the bigness of eight hundred moidores."

Voltaire's Candide (1759), chapter 9, contains the line: "My Lady has moidores and diamonds".

In Charles Lamb's "The Old Benchers of the Inner Temple", one of his Essays of Elia (1823), the author says of Thomas Coventry, "nor did he look, or walk, worth a moidore less".

Herman Melville's Moby-Dick (1851) includes the passage: "I have seen doubloons now before in my voyagings; your doubloons of old Spain; your doubloons of Peru, your doubloons of Chili, your doubloons of Bolivia, your doubloons of Popayan; with plenty of gold moidores and pistoles, and joes, and half joes, and quarter joes."

Robert Louis Stevenson's Treasure Island (1883) includes a reference to "doubloons and double guineas and moidores and sequins".

In Sir Arthur Conan Doyle's The Sign of the Four (1890), Jonathan Small wonders "how my folk would stare when they saw their ne'er-do-well coming back with his pockets full of gold moidores" when justifying his decision to help end Achmet's life for the treasure he carried.

John Masefield's poem "Cargoes" (1903) includes the stanza:

Stately Spanish galleon coming from the Isthmus,
Dipping through the Tropics by the palm-green shores,
With a cargo of diamonds,
Emeralds, amethysts,
Topazes, and cinnamon, and gold moidores.
