= Cape Verdean escudo =

Currency of the Republic of Cabo Verde

escudo cabo-verdiano (Portuguese); skudu kabuverdianu (Kabuverdianu)
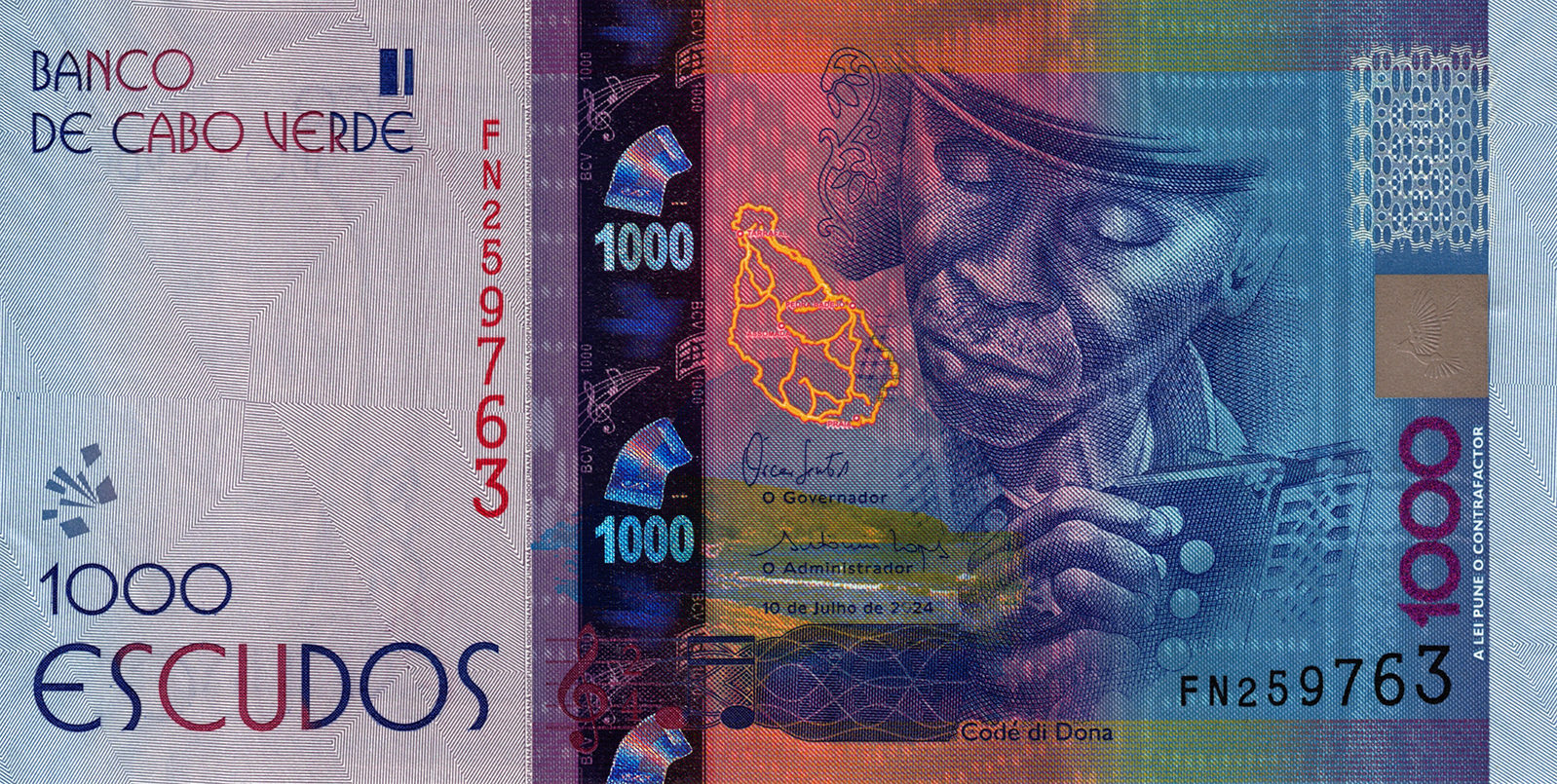
- Current 1000 Escudo note

ISO 4217
- Code: CVE (numeric: 132)
- Subunit: 0.01

Units of account
- Symbol: , $
- Subunit
- 1/100: centavo (discontinued)

Denominations
- Banknotes: 200, 500, 1000, 2000, 5000 escudos
- Coins
- Freq. used: 5, 10, 20, 50, 100 escudos
- Rarely used: 1, 200, 250 escudos

Demographics
- Replaced: Cape Verdean real
- User(s): Cape Verde

Issuance
- Central bank: Bank of Cape Verde
- Website: www.bcv.cv

Valuation
- Inflation: 0.6%
- Source: September 2015
- Pegged with: euro (1 EUR = 110.265 CVE)

The escudo (sign:; ISO 4217: CVE) is the currency of the Republic of Cape Verde. One escudo is subdivided into one hundred centavos.

Amounts are generally written by using the cifrão ($) as the decimal separator, such as 2000 for 20 escudos, or 1.00000 for 1000. The term conto is used for an amount of a thousand escudos.

== History ==
The escudo became the currency of Cape Verde in 1914. It replaced the Cape Verdean real at a rate of 1000 réis = 1 escudo. Until 1930, Cape Verde used Portuguese coins, although banknotes were issued by the Banco Nacional Ultramarino specifically for Cape Verde beginning in 1865.

Until independence in 1975, the Cape Verde escudo was equal to the Portuguese escudo. Subsequently, it depreciated, declining by about 30 per cent in 1977–78 and by a further 40 per cent in 1982–84. Thereafter, it remained fairly stable against the Portuguese escudo.

In mid-1998 an agreement with Portugal established a pegged rate of 1 Portuguese escudo = 0.55 Cape Verdean escudos. Since the replacement of the Portuguese escudo with the euro, the Cape Verdean escudo has been pegged to the euro at a rate of 1 EUR = 110.265 CVE. This peg is supported by a credit facility from the Portuguese government.

== Coins ==
Bi-metallic coins of 100 escudos

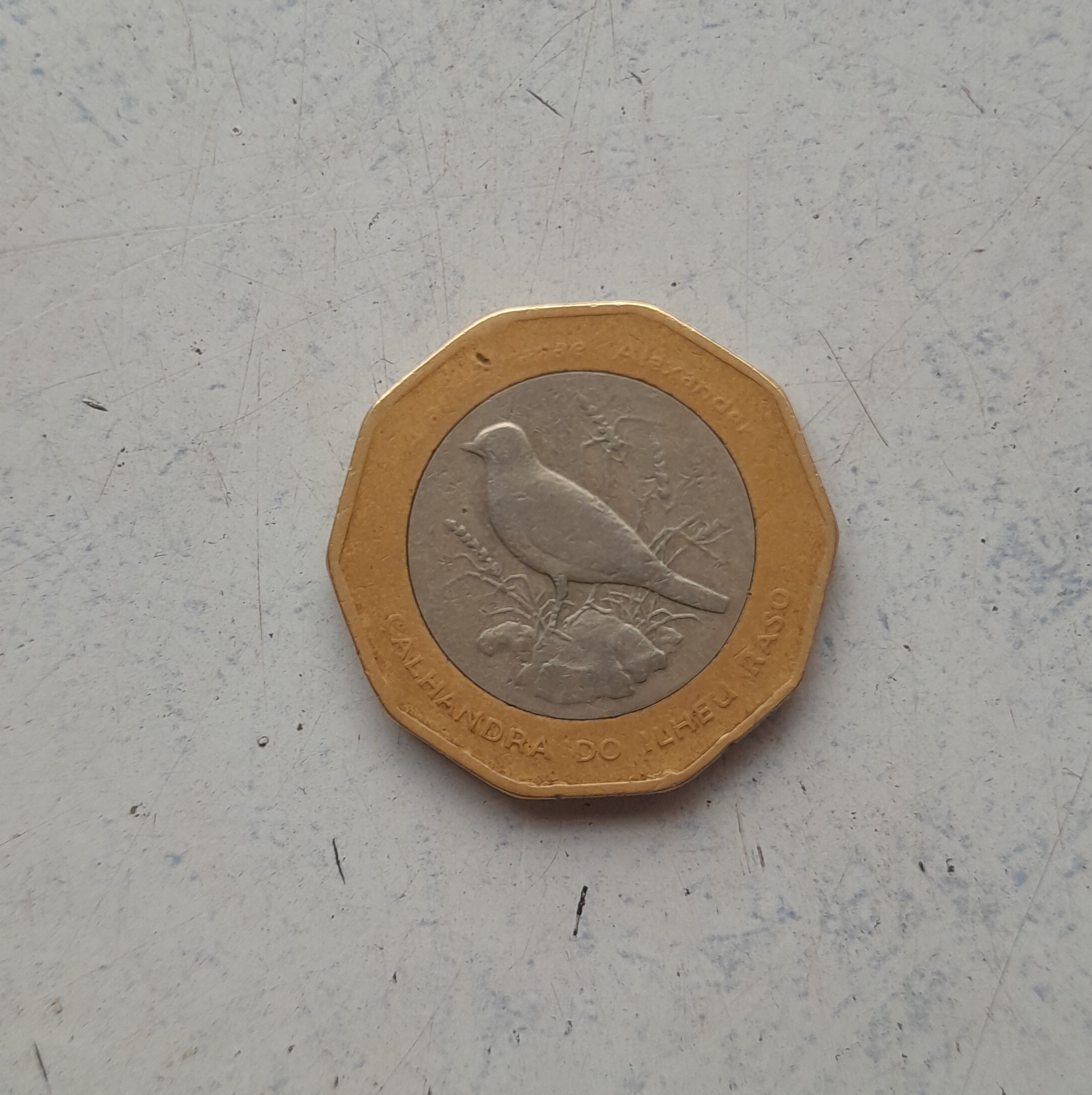
Raso lark (reverse)

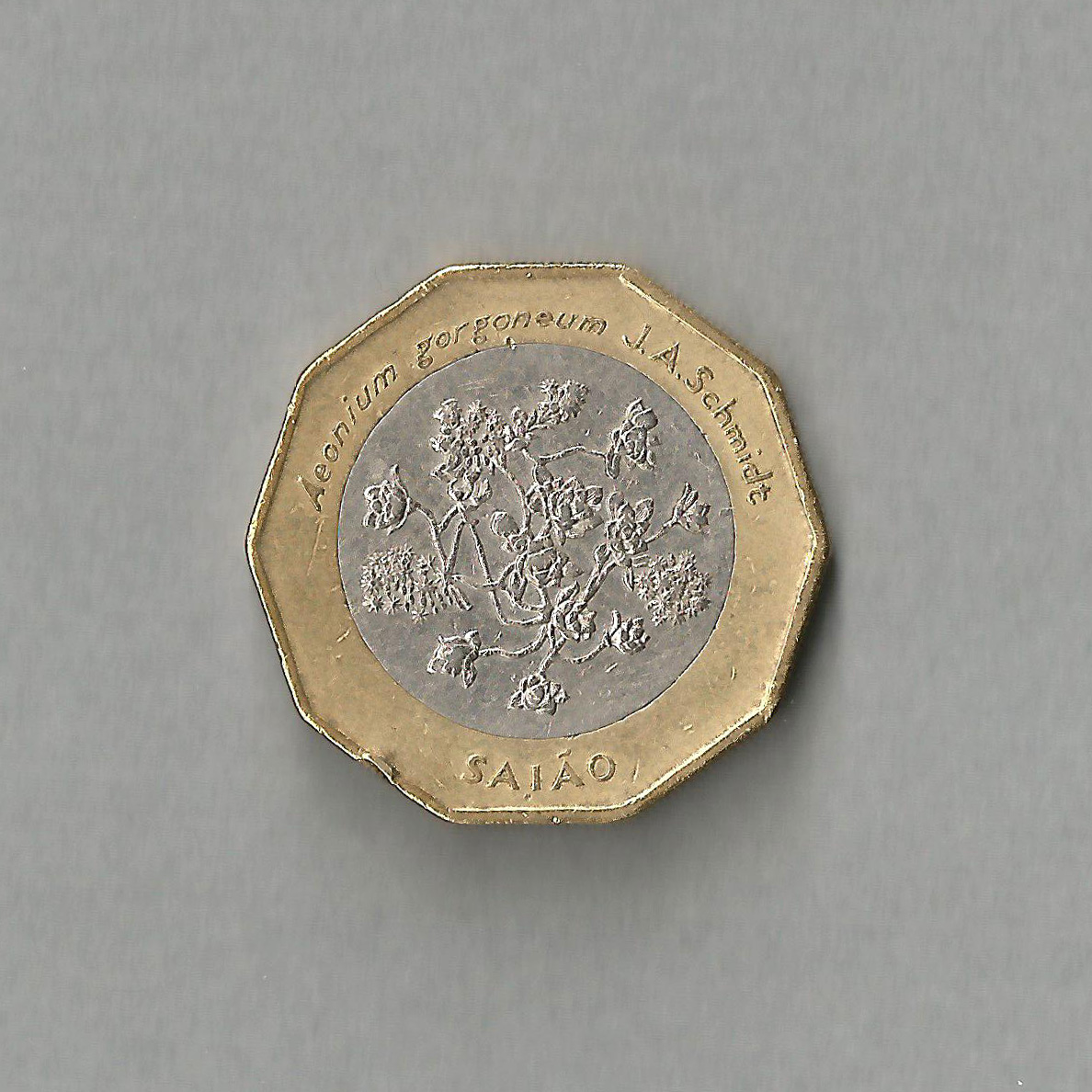
Aeonium gorgoneum (reverse)

Under Portuguese rule, coins were introduced in 1930 in denominations of 5, 10, 20 and 50 centavos and 1 escudo. The 5, 10 and 20 centavos were struck in bronze whilst the 50 centavos and 1 escudo were in nickel-bronze. In 1953, bronze 1 escudo, nickel-bronze 2 1/2 escudos and silver 10 escudos were introduced, followed by bronze 50 centavos and nickel-bronze 5 escudos in 1968.

After independence, coins were issued in 1977 in denominations of 20 and 50 centavos, 1, 2 1/2, 10, 20 and 50 escudos. The centavo coins were aluminium, the 1 and 2 1/2 escudos were nickel-bronze and the higher denominations were cupro-nickel. As inflation persisted the centavo coins progressively disappeared from circulation and by the time the coinage was revamped the 1 escudo coin was the smallest in circulation.

The present coinage was introduced in 1994. The smallest was a brass-plated-steel 1 escudo, though the 1 escudo does not circulate well and vendors tend to round to the nearest five in practice. This coin comes in only one style, featuring a sea turtle, while the other denominations came with three topical styles. These are the copper-plated-steel 5 escudos, nickel-plated-steel 10, 20 and 50 escudos, and bimetallic, decagonal 100 escudos. The three congruent design series had one featuring native animals (Birds and reptiles), the second was of historical ships with their names included, and the last was of native plants and ferns. Heptagonal 200 escudo coins have been issued in 1995 to commemorate the 50th anniversary of FAO and 20 years of independence. Another 200 escudo coin, this time round was issued in 2005 to commemorate the 30th anniversary of independence. Circulation of the 200 escudo coin is not quite as widespread as the other denominations but they are still commonly distributed and accepted alongside the 200 escudo note.

== Banknotes ==
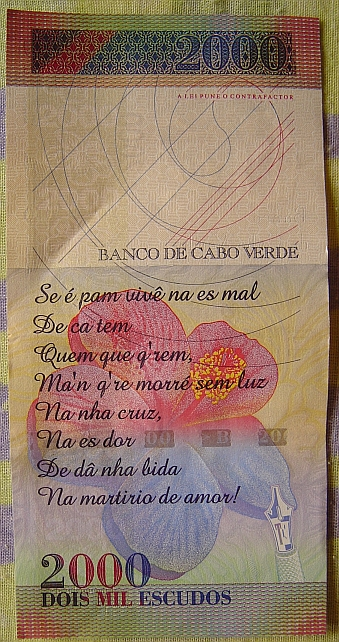
2000 CVE bill issued in 2006

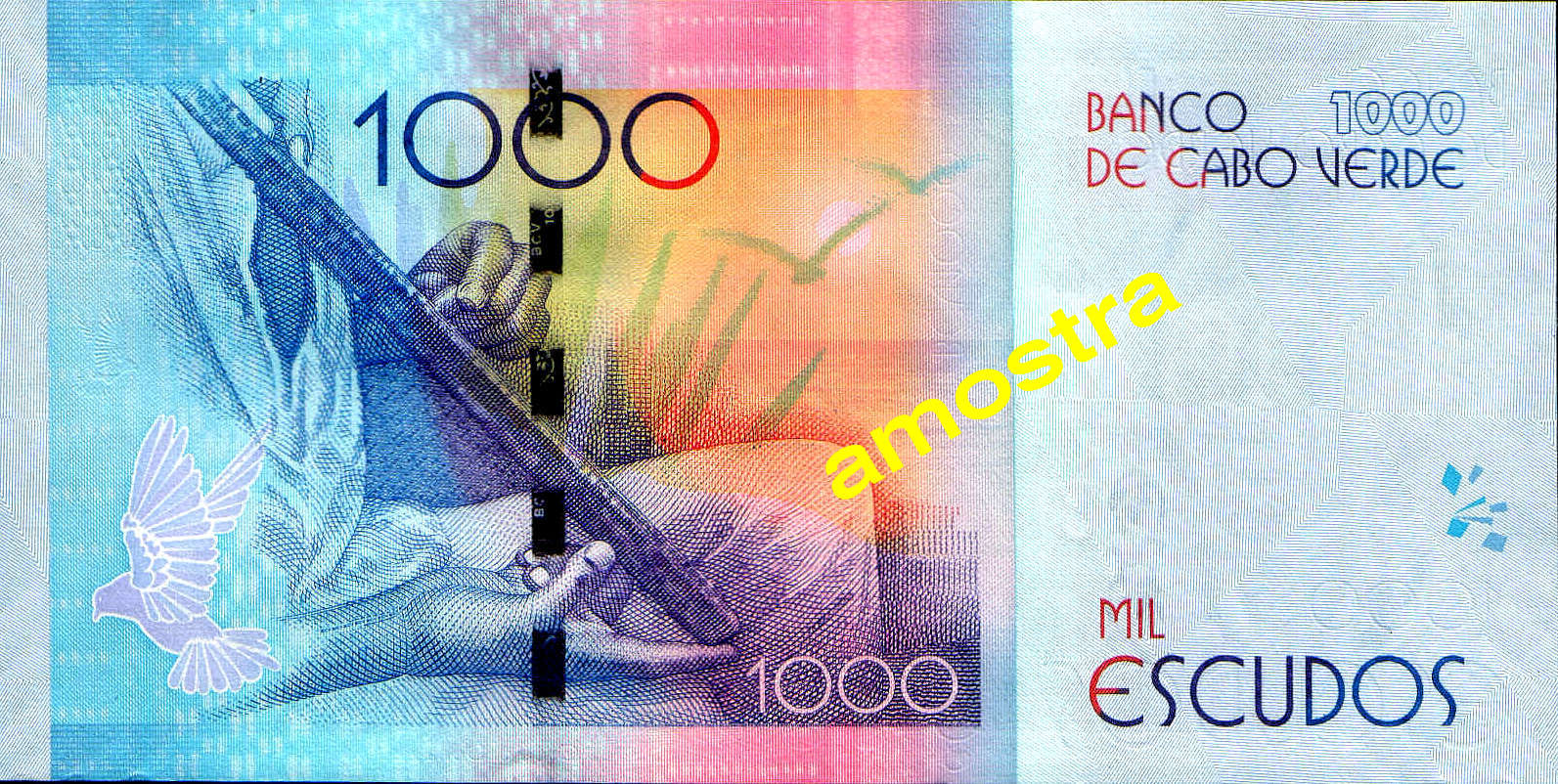
2014: new 1000 CVE bank note with Codé di Dona (back, showing a ferrinho)

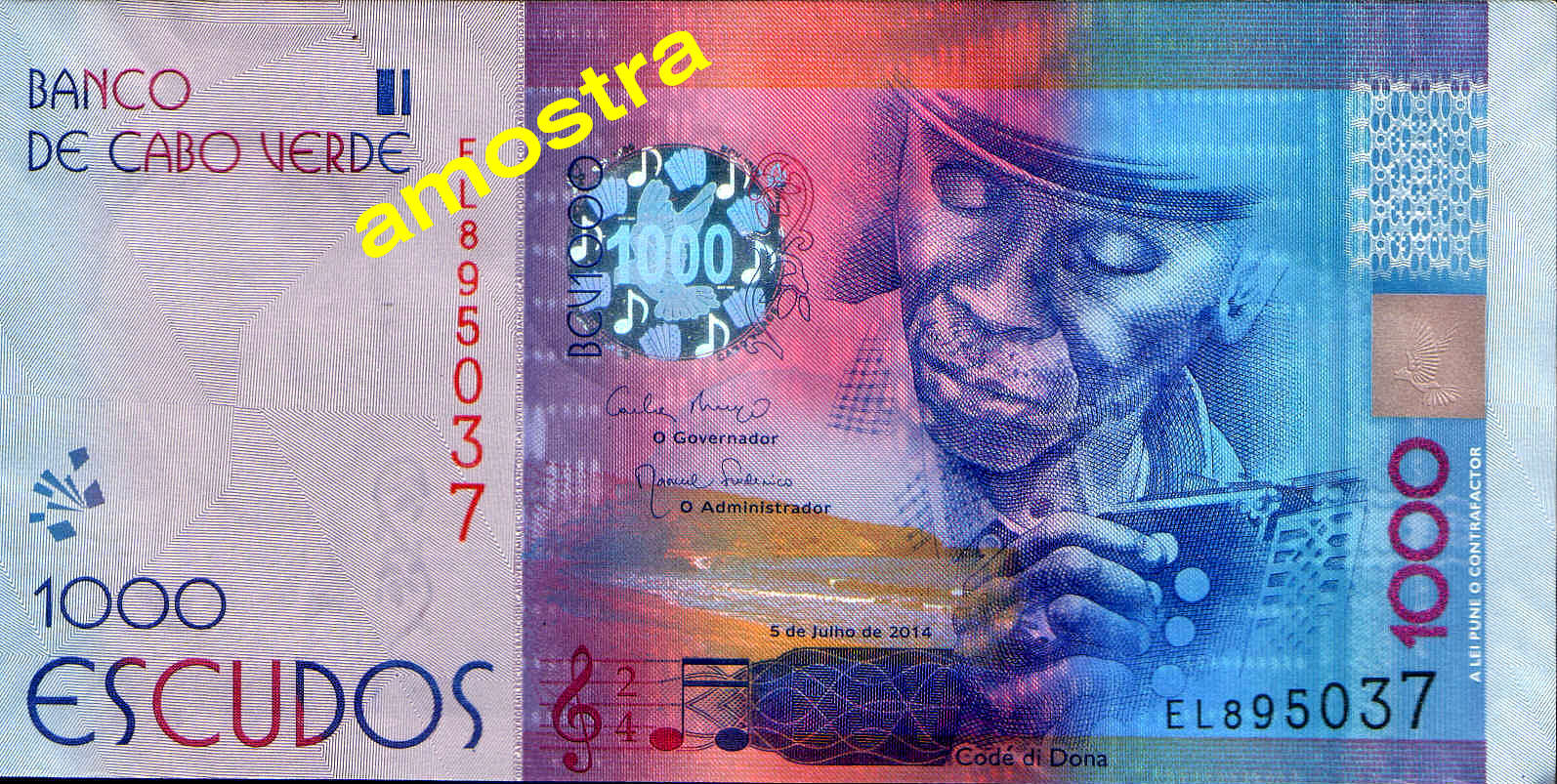
2014: new 1000 CVE bank note with Codé di Dona (front)

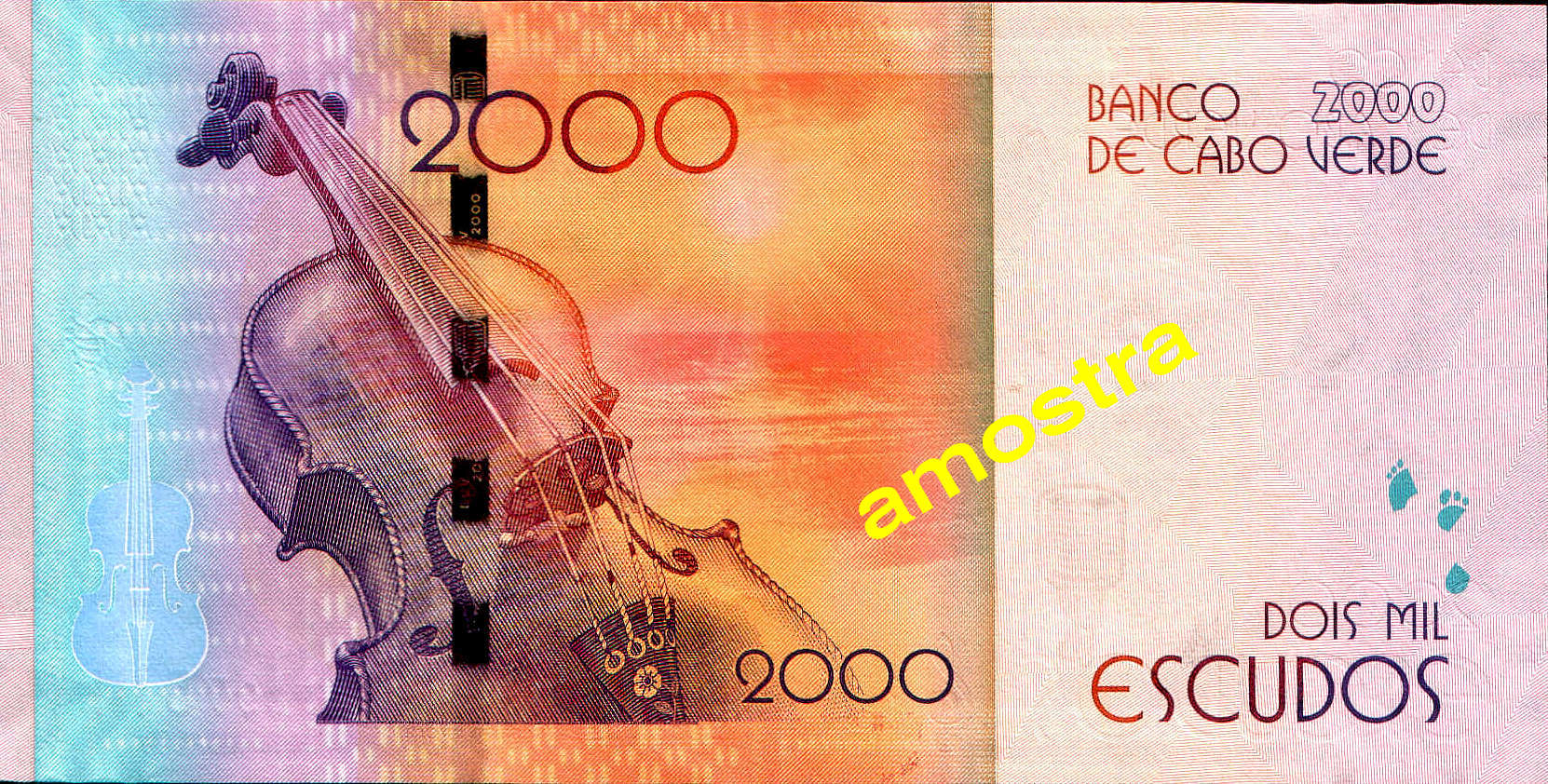
2014: new 2000 CVE bank note with Cesária Évora (back)

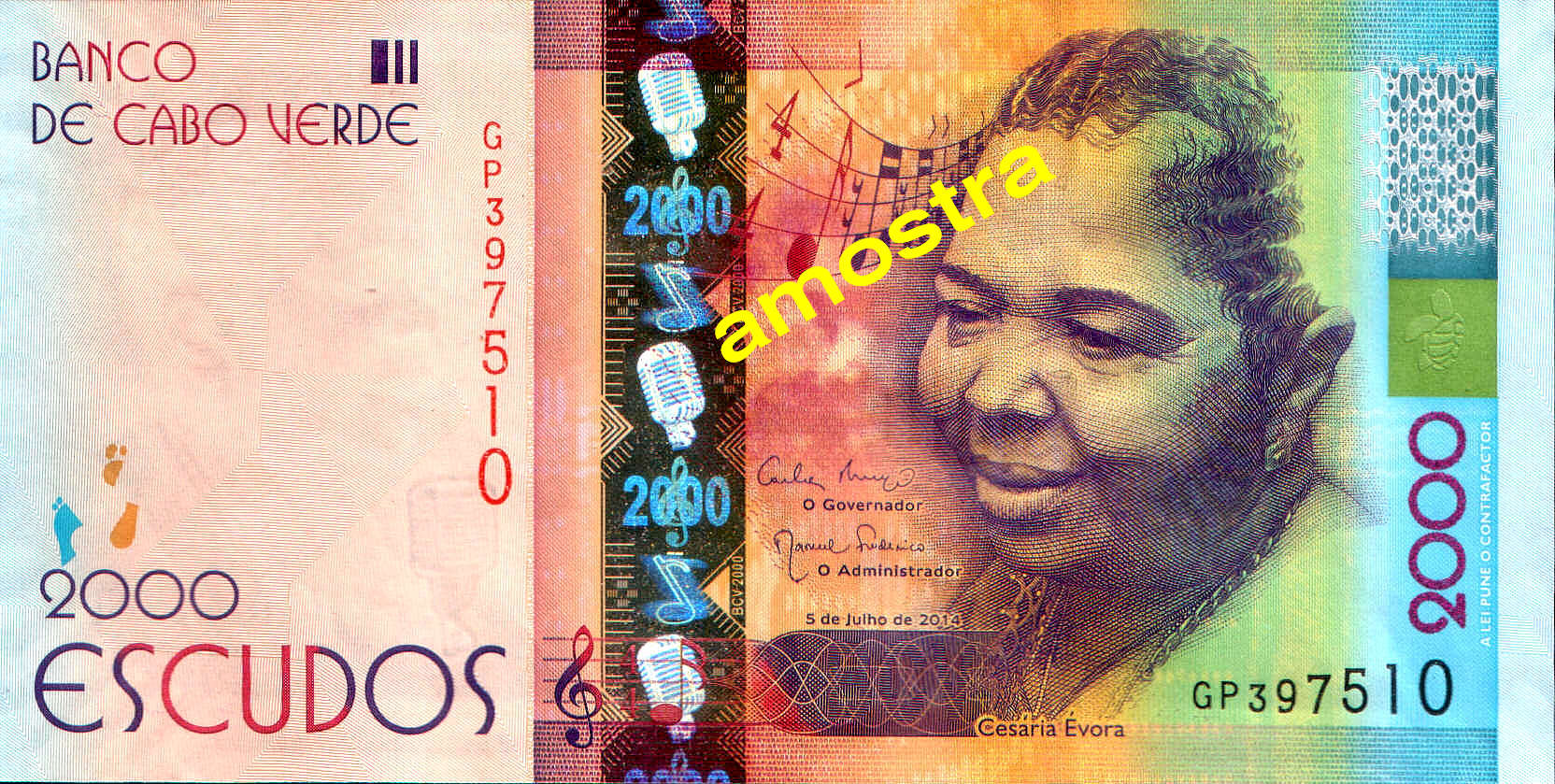
2014: new 2000 CVE bank note with Cesária Évora (front)

In 1914, the Banco Nacional Ultramarino introduced notes in denominations of 4, 5, 10, 20 and 50 centavos. In 1921, notes for 1, 5, 10, 20, 50 and 100 escudos were issued. The next series of notes, introduced in 1945, omitted all denominations below 5 escudos (which had been replaced by coins) and included 500 escudo notes. 10 escudo notes were replaced by coins in 1953, with the 5 escudo note also withdrawn.

After independence on 5 July 1975, notes were issued for 100, 500, and 1000 escudos on 1 July 1977. The next series of notes was introduced in 1989 and consisted of 100, 200, 500, 1000 and 2500 escudos.

The third series was introduced in 1992 in denominations of 200, 500, 1000, with the addition in 1999 of 2000 and 5000 escudo notes. In 2005, the 200 escudo note was redesigned, followed by the 500 and 1000 in 2007.

On 22 December 2014, the Banco de Cabo Verde introduced a new series of banknotes that honor Cape Verdean figures in the fields of literature, music, and politics. It consists of denominations of 200, 1,000 and 2,000 escudos issued in 2014, with the former now printed on polymer, and banknotes of 500 and 5,000 escudos issued in 2015.

== Historical exchange rates ==
Date	Brazilian real	Euro^{1}	Portuguese escudo^{2}	United States dollar
1995	–	–	1/1.93	76.853
1996	–	–	1/1.90	82.591
1997	–	–	1/1.90	93.177
1998	–	–	0.55 (fixed rate)	98.158
1999	–	110.265 (fixed rate)	0.55000	102.700
December 1999	–	110.265 (fixed rate)	0.55000	107.285
2005	–	110.265 (fixed rate)	obsolete	about 90
February 2006	about 40 to 50	110.265 (fixed rate)	obsolete	about 90
April 2006	about 40 to 50	110.265 (fixed rate)	obsolete	–
January 2007	39.86	110.265 (fixed rate)	obsolete	85.36

1. currency created on 1 January 1999; not in circulation until 1 January 2002
2. currency no longer legal tender as of 1 March 2002

Current CVE exchange rates
From Google Finance:	AUD CAD CHF CNY EUR GBP HKD JPY USD XOF
From Yahoo! Finance:	AUD CAD CHF CNY EUR GBP HKD JPY USD XOF
From XE.com:	AUD CAD CHF CNY EUR GBP HKD JPY USD XOF
From OANDA:	AUD CAD CHF CNY EUR GBP HKD JPY USD XOF

Note: These rates are obtained from XE.com and may deviate from the fixed rate mentioned above

== See also ==
- Currencies related to the euro
- Economy of Cape Verde
- Dollar sign#One stroke vs. two strokes - display is font-dependent
