= Catalan peseta =

Former currency of Catalonia

The Catalan peseta (in Catalan: peceta; pl. pecetes) was a unit of currency in Catalonia until 1850, when the whole of Spain decimalized. It was also a name used throughout Spain for an amount of four reales de vellón. It was coined in Barcelona in gold and silver from 1808 until 1814, under the Napoleonic government.

In Catalonia, the peseta was subdivided into six sous, each of four quarts (also spelled cuartos in Spanish), eight ochavos or twelve dineros. Five pesetas were equal to one duro, which was itself equal to the Spanish eight reales de plata fuerte (Spanish dollar). In the new, decimal currency, the peseta was worth four reales.

The name peseta reappeared in 1868 for the new Spanish currency. Its value was equivalent to that of the earlier peseta.

== Etymology ==
The name of the currency comes from the Catalan diminutive form of the word peça (piece) synonym of coin.
