= Cape Verdean real =

Currency in Cape Verde

The real (plural réis) was the currency of Portuguese Cape Verde until 1914. It was equal to the Portuguese real. Portuguese coins were used but banknotes were issued by the Banco Nacional Ultramarino specifically for Cape Verde starting in 1865. The real was replaced by the Cape Verdean escudo, at a rate of 1000 réis = 1 escudo.

== Banknotes ==
In 1865, Portuguese notes were overstamped for use in Cape Verde. In 1897, notes specifically designed for Cape Verde were introduced, in denominations of 1000, 2500 and 5000 réis. Notes for 10,000, 20,000 and 50,000 réis followed in 1909.
