= Société française de numismatique =

French learned society

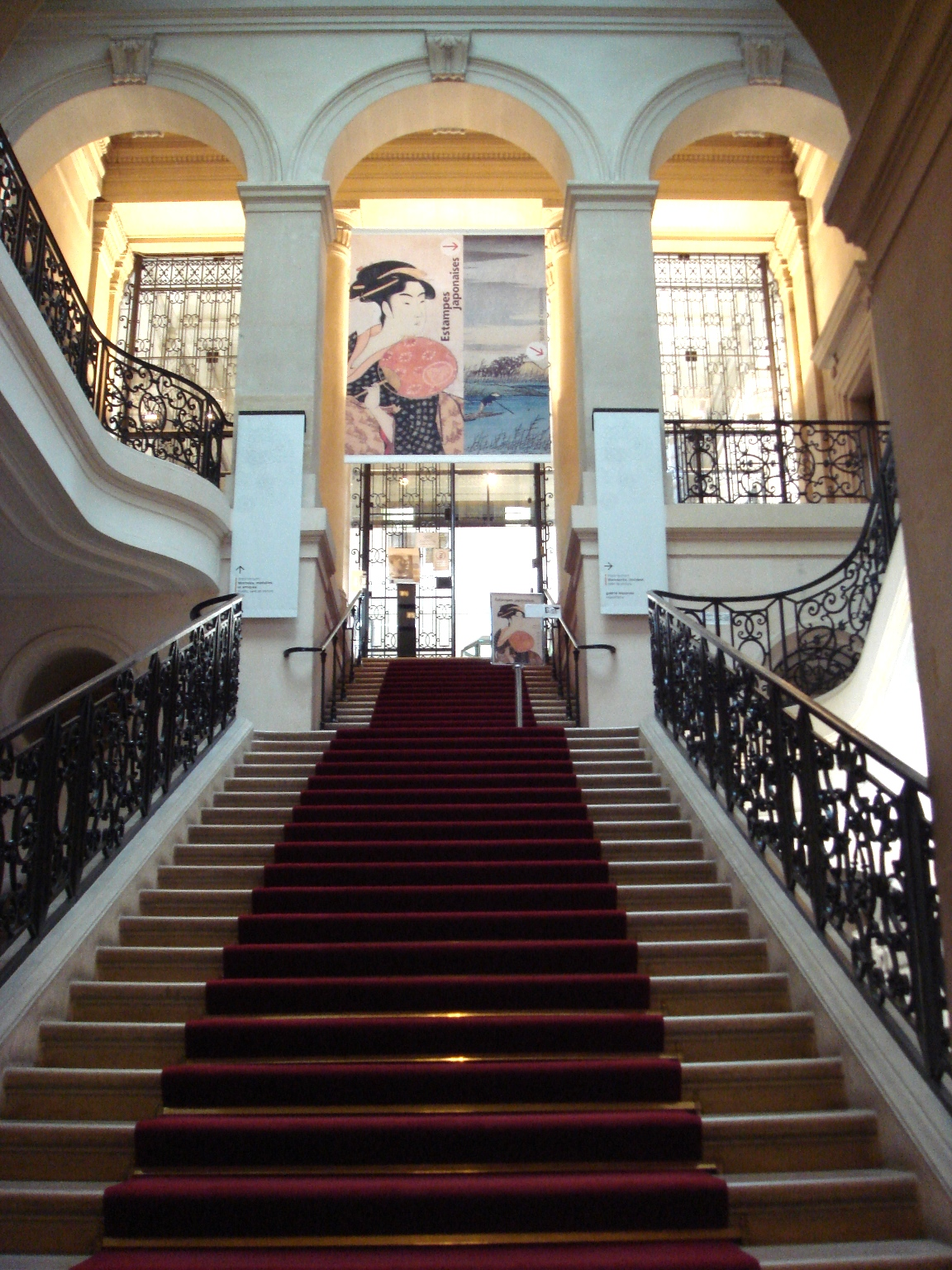
- Cabinet des médailles siège de la Société française de numismatique.
- Formation: December 18, 1865; 160 years ago
- Founder: Gustave de Ponton d'Amécourt
- Location: Paris, France
- Key people: Sylvia Nieto-Pelletier (President), Bruno Jané (General Secretary)
- Website: www.sfnumismatique.org
- Formerly called: Société française de numismatique et d'archéologie

The Société française de numismatique (English: French Numismatic Society) is a French learned society working in the field of numismatics. It is a member of the International Numismatic Council.

== History ==
From the beginning of the Renaissance, princes and humanists were interested in ancient numismatics, and built up coin collections in their cabinet of curiosities. The Cabinet de Louis XIV, first set up in Versailles and then in Paris, is at the origin of the present-day Département des Monnaies, Médailles et Antiques of the Bibliothèque nationale de France. From the 19th century onwards, this interest extended to national coins, and saw the development of a milieu of enlightened enthusiasts eager to discuss and communicate their discoveries. The Revue de la numismatique française was founded in 1836 by two members of the "Société royale des antiquaires de France et de plusieurs autres Sociétés archéologiques françoises et étrangères". Today, the Revue is the property of the Société française de numismatique, and its creation can be considered the first act in its history.

The project of a learned society dedicated solely to numismatics had been formed in the first year of the Revue. It was founded in 1865 under the name "Société française de numismatique et d'archéologie" (French Society of Numismatics and Archaeology) by Ernest Gariel, Ernest Lecomte, Abbé Marchant, Jules Roman, and Gustave de Ponton d'Amécourt, who became its first president. The society initially operated like a club, meeting four times a month in its premises, which included a library and a small collection of coins, near Boulevard Saint-Germain. The number of members quickly grew, reaching 650 in 1869, before experiencing a period of crisis between 1860 and 1880 characterized by a decline in membership and financial difficulties.

From the mid-1880s onwards, a closer collaboration with the Cabinet des Médailles and a revival in publications (the 3rd series of the Revue Numismatique) helped to overcome these difficulties. In 1897, the Society adopted new statutes and became the Société française de Numismatique, developing its links with foreign societies, as well as with the Sorbonne and the Monnaie de Paris. In 1924, the Society was recognized as a public utility. Between 1934 and 1939, it awarded foreign numismatists a vermeil medal.

Although its activities were interrupted by the war, a provisional office was reconstituted in 1941, and in 1945 the Society moved definitively to the Cabinet des Médailles (now the Département des Monnaies, Médailles et Antiques) of the Bibliothèque nationale de France. The same year saw the publication of the Bulletin de la Société, which reports on the work presented at the monthly meetings and on current events. In 1958, the Société became the owner of the Revue numismatique, and in 1982 began publishing the Trésors antiques de la France (TAF). Since 1969, it has awarded a vermeil token to foreign numismatists.

The meetings take place in the Émilie du Châtelet room (formerly the Commission room) of the National Library of France, bringing together collectors, professional numismatists, curators of public collections, CNRS researchers, academics, and others sharing the same field of interest. All major French numismatists have been or are members of the Society, and often have served on its board. Since 1956, Numismatic Days have also been organized, held annually alongside a provincial society and its collections.

== See also ==
- Jeton de vermeil

== Bibliography ==
- "Revue Numismatique". Persée digital database. (in French).
- Bulletin de la Société française de Numismatique (English: Bulletin of the French Numismatic Society)
- Le Rider, Georges; Mazard, Jean; Yvon, Jacques; Prieur, Pierre (1965). "La Société française de numismatique: 1865–1963". Revue Numismatique. 6 (7): 15–29. doi:10.3406/numi.1965.919. ISSN 0484-8942.
- Lafaurie, Jean (1986). "La Revue numismatique a 150 ans". Revue Numismatique. 6 (28): 7–50. doi:10.3406/numi.1986.1883.
