= Portuguese real =

Currency of Portugal from c. 1430 until 1911

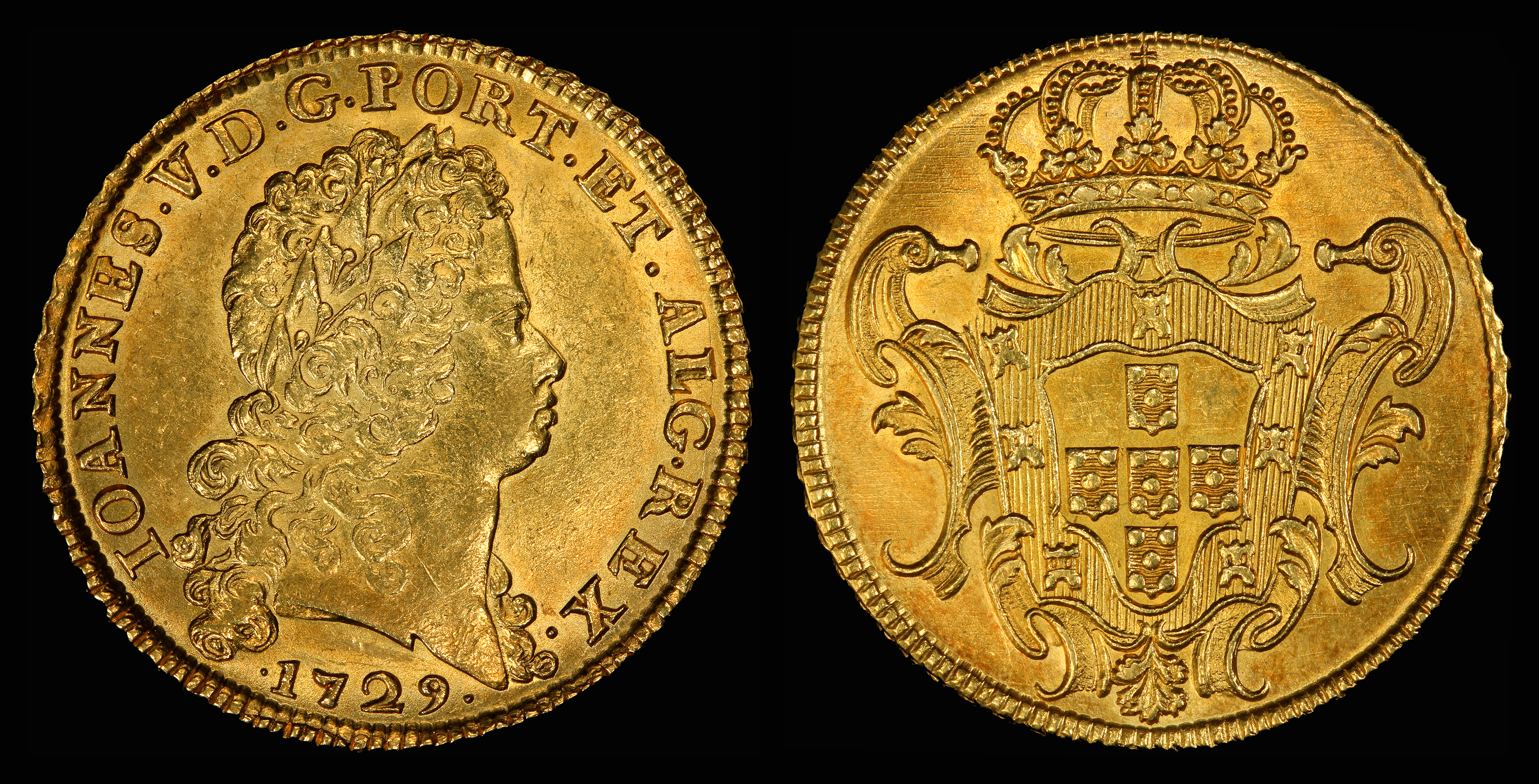
An eight réis gold coin depicting king John V of Portugal (obv) and the coat of arms of Portugal (rev). While different denominations of the Portuguese gold real were produced from 1722 to 1821, the eight réis coin was only struck for a fairly brief period (1722 and 1724–30).

The real (Portuguese pronunciation: [ʁiˈal], meaning "royal", plural: réis or [archaic] reais) was the unit of currency of Portugal and the Portuguese Empire from around 1430 until 1911. It replaced the dinheiro at the rate of 1 real = 3 1/2 libras = 70 soldos = 840 dinheiros and was itself replaced by the escudo (as a result of the Republican revolution of 1910) at a rate of 1 escudo = 1000 réis. The escudo was further replaced by the euro at a rate of 1 euro = 200.482 escudos in 2002.

== History ==
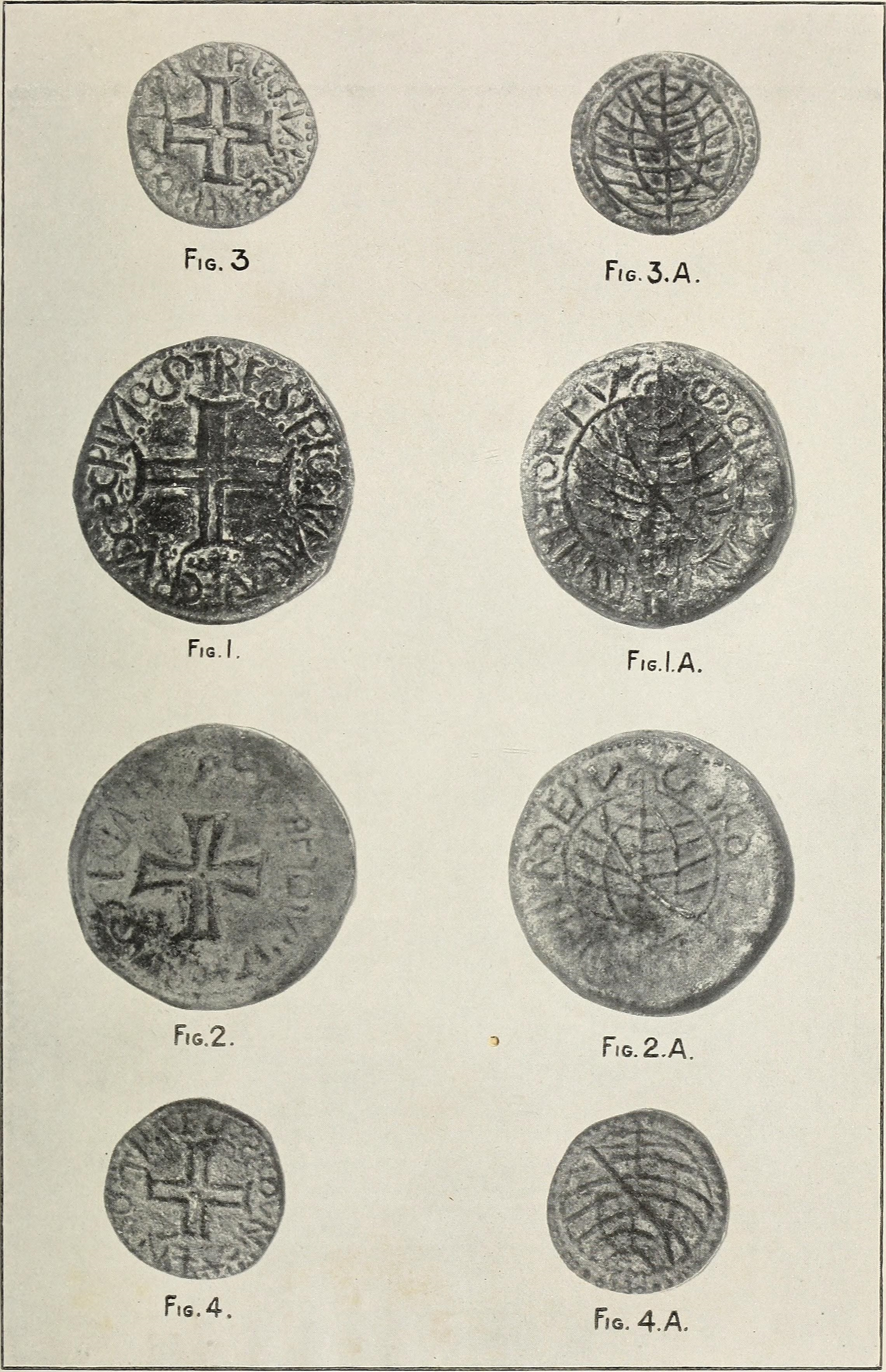
Portuguese Malacca tin coins of King Manuel I's (1495–1521) and King João III's (1521–1557) reigns were discovered during an excavation near the Malacca River mouth by W. Edgerton, Resident Councilor of Malacca, in 1900.

The first real was introduced by King Fernando I around 1380. It was a silver coin and had a value of 120 dinheiros (10 soldos or 1/2 libra). In the reign of King João I (1385–1433), the real branco of 3 1/2 libras (initially real cruzado ) and the real preto of 7 soldos (1/10 of a real branco) were issued. By the beginning of the reign of King Duarte I in 1433, the real branco (equivalent to 840 dinheiros) had become the unit of account in Portugal. From the reign of King Manuel I (1495–1521), the name was simplified to real, coinciding with the switch to minting real coins from copper.

Due to the historically low value of the real, large sums were usually expressed in milréis (or mil-réis) of 1,000 réis, a term that has been in use since at least the 1760s. In figures, a mil-réis was written as 1$000, with the cifrão or $ sign functioning as a decimal point for monetary amounts, so that 60,500 réis would be written as 60$500 or 60.5 milréis.

Since the Brazilian Gold Rush of the 18th century, Portuguese gold coins gained currency worldwide, and especially with its ally the United Kingdom. Its most familiar gold coins were issued in multiples of gold escudos, which were valued at 1$600 and which contained 3.286 g fine gold.

The Napoleonic Wars of the early 19th century spawned the issue of the paper milréis which eventually depreciated versus the silver cruzado and the gold escudo. The monetary reform of 1837 recognized the lower value of the milréis by increasing the value of the gold escudo from 1$600 to 2$000. It also changed the main unit of account from the real to the milréis (1$000) with decimal subdivisions used in its coins.

The Banco de Portugal issued its first banknotes in 1847. In 1854, Portugal adopted a gold standard with the milréis equal to 1.62585 g fine gold. This standard was maintained until 1891.

In 1911, the escudo replaced the real at the rate of 1 escudo = 1,000 réis as the Portuguese currency unit (not to be confused with the gold escudo worth 1$600). One million réis (or one thousand mil-réis, written 1.000$000) was known as a conto de réis. This term survived the introduction of the escudo to mean 1,000 escudos and is now used to mean five euros, almost exactly the converted value of 1,000 escudos or one million réis (1 conto is approximately €4.98798).

The old Brazilian real was initially valued at par with the Portuguese real, but from 1740 it was valued lower by a factor of 10/11, increasing the value of the gold escudo from 1$600 to 1$760. After the Napoleonic Wars the Brazilian unit was devalued further, with the escudo rising to 2$500 in 1834 and 4$000 in 1846.

Coins and banknotes were also issued denominated in réis for use in the different parts of the Portuguese Empire. See: Angolan real, Azorean real, Brazilian real, Cape Verde real, Mozambican real, Portuguese Guinea real and São Tomé and Príncipe real. Brazil has revived the real as the denomination of its present currency.

Portuguese influence in the Persian Gulf, especially in Portuguese Oman extended the use of the term "real", though not the actual currency or value, to the Middle East and the slightly Arabicized form of the word "real", the "riyal" is the currency of The Kingdom of Saudi Arabia and the current (but soon to be former currency in favor of the toman) of Iran.

== Coins ==
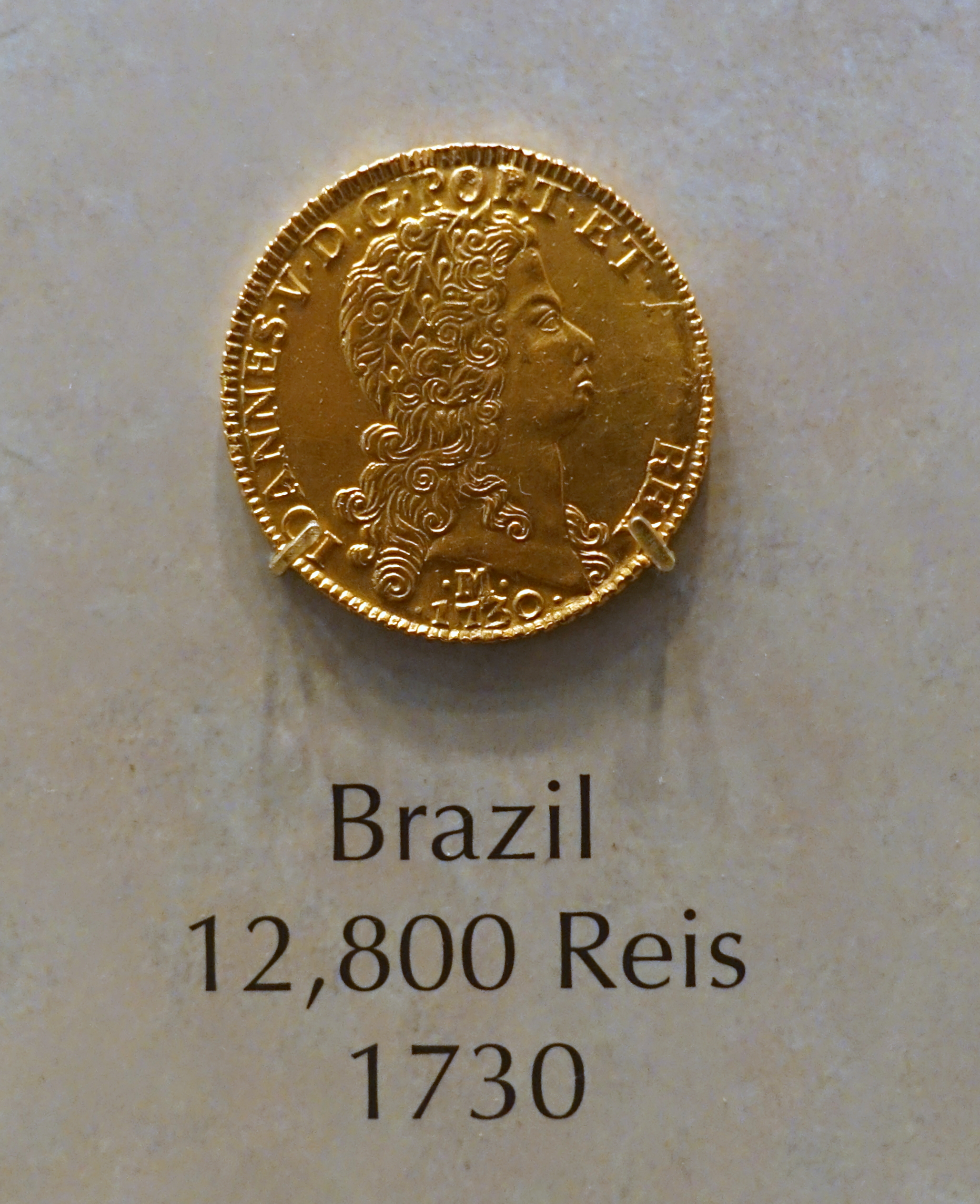
Onça or 12$800 réis minted in 1730 during the Brazilian Gold Rush.

Before the middle of the 19th century, many different denominations were minted, often with values in terms of the real which increased over time. For example, the cruzado was introduced at a value of 324 real branco in the reign of King João II. It was fixed at a value of 400 réis during King João III's reign and this remained the value of the silver cruzado until the reign of King Pedro II, when it was revalued to 480 réis. Meanwhile, the gold cruzado rose in value to 750 réis in the reign of King João IV, then to 875 réis in the reign of King Afonso VI before its demise.

The last 1 real coins (excluding colonial issues) were minted in the 1580s. After this time, the smallest coins were worth 1 1/2 réis. These were minted until around 1750, after which the three real coin became the smallest circulating denomination.

Gold coins issued during the Brazilian Gold Rush of the 18th century belonged to either the moidore series of 1688–1732 or the joannese series of 1722–1835. A description of the coins of the moidore series:

- The most familiar coin of this series is the moeda d'ouro (literally "gold coin", and commonly Anglicised as the moidore), stamped 4,000 réis but actually valued 20% higher or 4,800 réis (4$800). This coin weighed 3/8 onça (explained below) and contained 9.86 g fine gold.
- Valued proportionately are coins of 480 réis (the cruzado), 1$200, 2$400, 12$000, and 24$000 (the dobrão), though they are stamped with their old values of 400, 1$000, 2$000, 10$000 and 20$000 réis, respectively.
- Silver coins were issued in denominations of 480 réis (cruzado) and 240, 100 (tostão), and 50 réis, though stamped with their old values of 400, 200, 80 and 40 réis, respectively.
- Copper coins were issued in denominations of 3, 5, 10, 20 and 40 réis.

While silver and copper denominations were left unchanged by the joannese series of 1722–1835, gold coins were issued instead in binary fractions of the gold onça (or ounce), which contained 28.68 g of 22-karat or 91.7% fine gold, and which was valued at 12$800. The most familiar coin of this series is the peça or 1/2 onça worth 6$400. Other denominations include the half-peça of 3$200, the escudo of 1$600, and the half-escudo of 0$800.

As the United Kingdom was on the gold standard starting 1717, Portuguese gold coins widely circulated there at the rate of 27 shillings (£1.35) for the moidore (4$800) and 9 shillings (£0.45) for the escudo (1$600). Gold moidores and joes of the Brazilian Gold Rush were often mentioned in English literary references of the 18th and 19th centuries.

Following the depreciation of the paper milréis during and after the Napoleonic Wars of the early 19th century, the gold peça of 13.145 g fine gold was raised in value from 6$400 to 7$500 in 1826, 8$000 in 1837, and 8$085 in 1854 (when the gold standard of 1.62585 g fine gold per milréis was implemented).

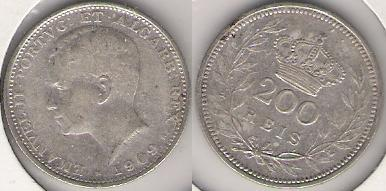
200 réis, King Manuel II of Portugal, 1909.

In 1837, a decimal system was adopted, with copper coins (bronze from 1882) of 3, 5, 10 and 20 réis, silver coins for 50, 100, 200, 500 and 1,000 réis and gold 1$000, 2$000, 2$500, 5$000 and 10$000. In 1875, the last 3 real coins were issued, with cupronickel 50 and 100 réis issued in 1900.

During Portugal's gold standard era from 1854 to 1891 the British gold sovereign or £1 coin was widely accepted in circulation with a value of 4$500.

== Banknotes ==
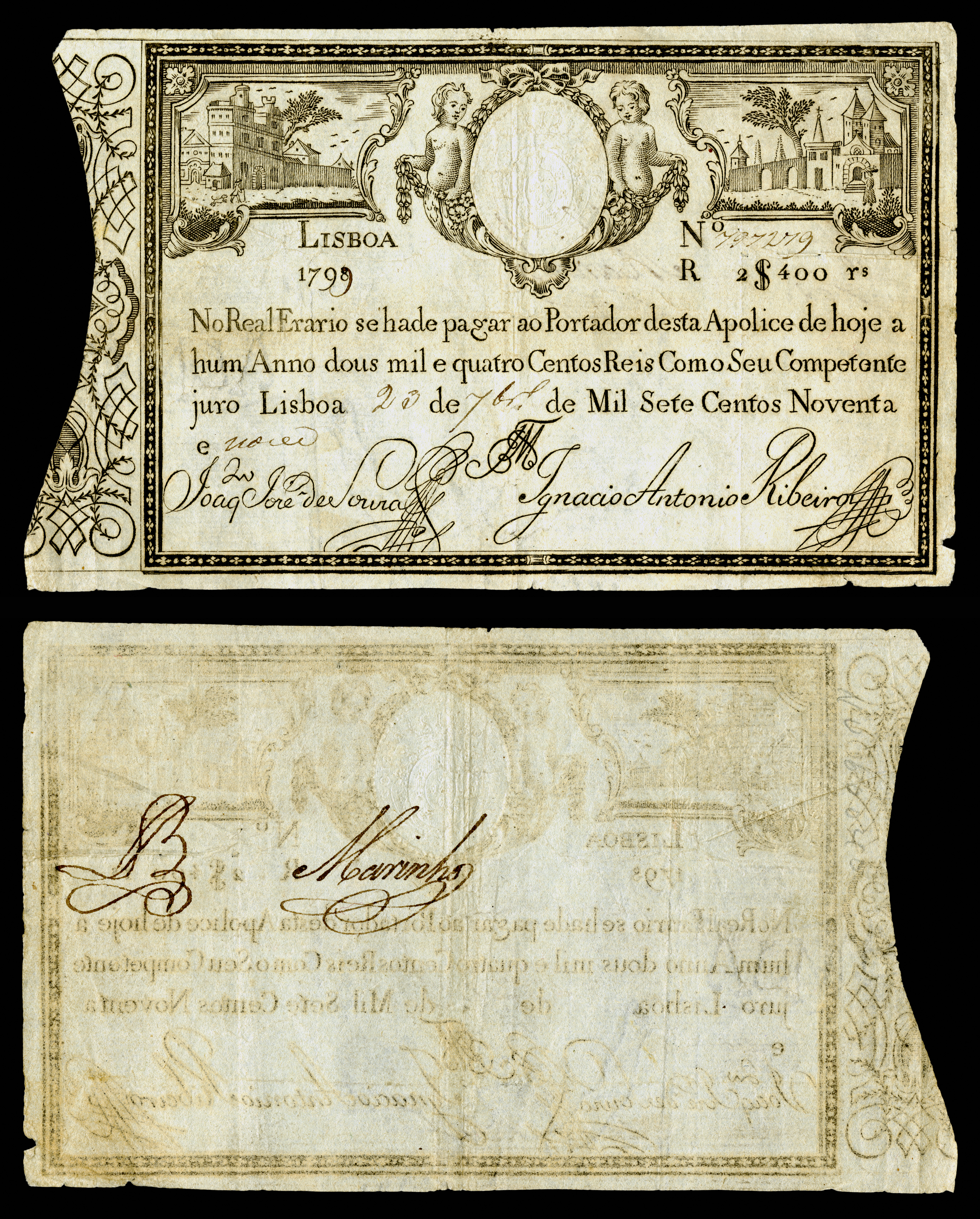
Imperial Treasury, 2$400 réis, 1798–99 issue.

Portugal's first paper money was introduced in 1797 by the government. Denominations issued until 1807 included 1$200, 2$400, 5$000, 6$400, 10$000, 12$000 and 20$000 réis. Some of these notes were revalidated for continued use during the War of the Two Brothers (1828 to 1834).

From the 1820s, several private banks issued paper money. The most extensive issues were by the Banco de Lisboa, whose notes were denominated in both réis and moedas, worth 4$800 réis. This bank issued notes for 1$200 and 2$400 réis, 1, 4, 10, 20, 50 and 100 moedas. The Banco Commercial de Braga, Banco Commercial do Porto, Banco de Guimaraes and Banco Industrial do Porto also issued notes, with bearer cheques issued by a number of other banks between 1833 and 1887.

In 1847, the Banco de Portugal introduced notes for 10$000 and 20$000 réis. 5$000 réis notes were issued from 1883, followed by 50$000 réis in 1886. In 1891, the Casa de Moeda introduced notes for 50 and 100 réis, and the Banco de Portugal introduced notes for 200, 500, 1$000 and 2$500 réis, followed by 100$000 real notes in 1894.

== See also ==
- Economic history of Portugal

== Bibliography ==
- Cuhaj, George S., ed. (2010). Standard Catalog of World Paper Money General Issues (1368-1960) (13 ed.). Krause. ISBN 978-1-4402-1293-2.
- Krause, Chester L.; Clifford Mishler (1991). Standard Catalog of World Coins: 1801–1991 (18th ed.). Krause Publications. ISBN 0873411501.
- Pick, Albert (1994). Bruce, Colin R. II; Shafer, Neil (eds.). Standard Catalog of World Paper Money: General Issues (7th ed.). Krause Publications. ISBN 0-87341-207-9.
- Pick, Albert (1990). Bruce, Colin R. II; Shafer, Neil (eds.). Standard Catalog of World Paper Money: Specialized Issues (6th ed.). Krause Publications. ISBN 0-87341-149-8.

Preceded by Portuguese dinheiro	Portuguese currency 1433–1911	Succeeded by Portuguese escudo
