= Portuguese dinheiro =

Currency of Portugal from c. late 12th century until c. 1502

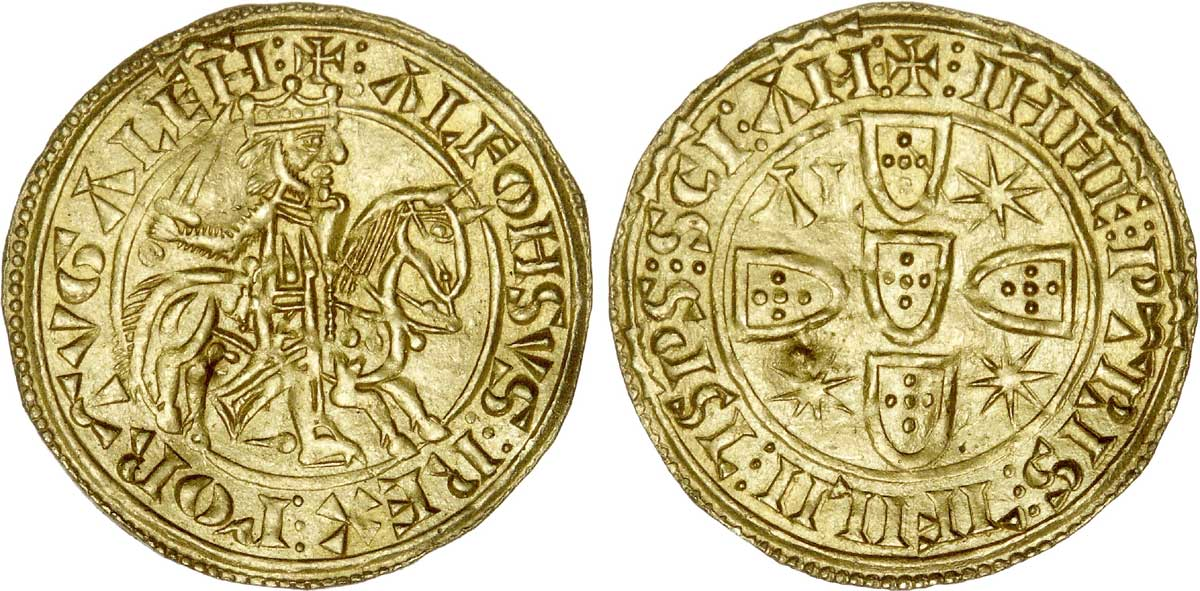
Afonso III of Portugal dinheiro coin

The dinheiro was the currency of Portugal from around the late 12th century until approximately 1502. For accounting purposes, twelve dinheiros equalled one soldo and twenty soldos equal one libra (pound). The basis of the monetary system was that of the Roman Empire (denarii, solidi, librae).

The first Portuguese coins were issued by the first king, Afonso I. Some time after 1179, he ordered the issue of coins in denominations of half a dinheiro (called a mealha) and one dinheiro. They were copied from the Spanish dinero and were consequently minted in billon. These circulated alongside Byzantine siliquae and Moorish dirhem and dinar.

Around 1200, Sancho I also introduced the gold morabitino (from the Muslim maravedi), worth 15 soldos. A century later, in the reign of King Denis, the silver tornês was introduced, worth 5 1/2 soldos.

In 1380, King Ferdinand I introduced several new coins. There were gold dobra, worth 6 libras, silver real worth 10 soldos and various billon denominations, some of whose names related to war equipment used by the French who helped Portugal in the war against Castile, such as the pilarte worth seven dinheiros.

During the reign of King João I, a new real was introduced, known either as the "real of 3 1/2 libras" or the "real branco". With a value of 70 soldos, this was to become the unit of account by the beginning of the reign of João I's successor (King Duarte I) in 1433.

Note that in modern Portuguese, the word "dinheiro" means "money".

Preceded by —	Portuguese currency 1128–1433	Succeeded by Portuguese real
