= Spanish dinero =

Former currency of Spain

The dinero (diner in Catalan) was the currency of many of the Christian states of the Iberian Peninsula from the 10th century. It evolved from the Carolingian denar (in Latin denarius) and was adopted by all Iberian Peninsula Carolingian-originated States: the Kingdom of Pamplona/Navarre, the Kingdom of Aragon, and the Catalan Counties. Twelve dineros equalled one sueldo, and in turn, twenty sueldos were equal to one libra.

It served in turn as the model for the Portuguese dinheiro.

In most of the Spanish States, the dinero was superseded by the maravedí and then the real as the unit of account. However, in the Principality of Catalonia and the Kingdom of Mallorca, the currency system based on the diner continued, with twelve diners to the sou and six sous the peseta.

Note that in modern Spanish, "dinero" means "money".
