= Maravedí =

Historic Iberian currency

The maravedí (Spanish pronunciation: [maɾaβeˈði]) or maravedi (Portuguese pronunciation: [mɐɾɐvɨˈði]), deriving from the Almoravid dinar (Arabic: المرابطي, romanized: al-murābiṭī), was the name of various Iberian coins of gold and then silver between the 11th and 14th centuries, and the name of different Iberian accounting units between the 11th and 19th centuries.

== Etymology ==
The word maravedí comes from marabet or marabotin, a variety of the gold dinar struck in al-Andalus by, and named after, the Almoravid dynasty (Arabic: المرابطون, romanized: al-Murābitūn sing. مرابط Murābit). The Spanish word maravedí is unusual in having three documented plural forms: maravedís, maravedíes and maravedises. The first one is the most straightforward, the second is a variant plural formation found commonly in words ending with a stressed -í, whereas the third is the most unusual and the least recommended (Royal Spanish Academy's Diccionario panhispánico de dudas labels it "vulgar in appearance").

== Minting ==
During the Middle Ages, the maravedí was minted in various denominations and materials, with silver being the most common. Initially, the maravedí was a gold coin, primarily minted during the reigns of Alfonso X of Castile and his successors.

== History ==
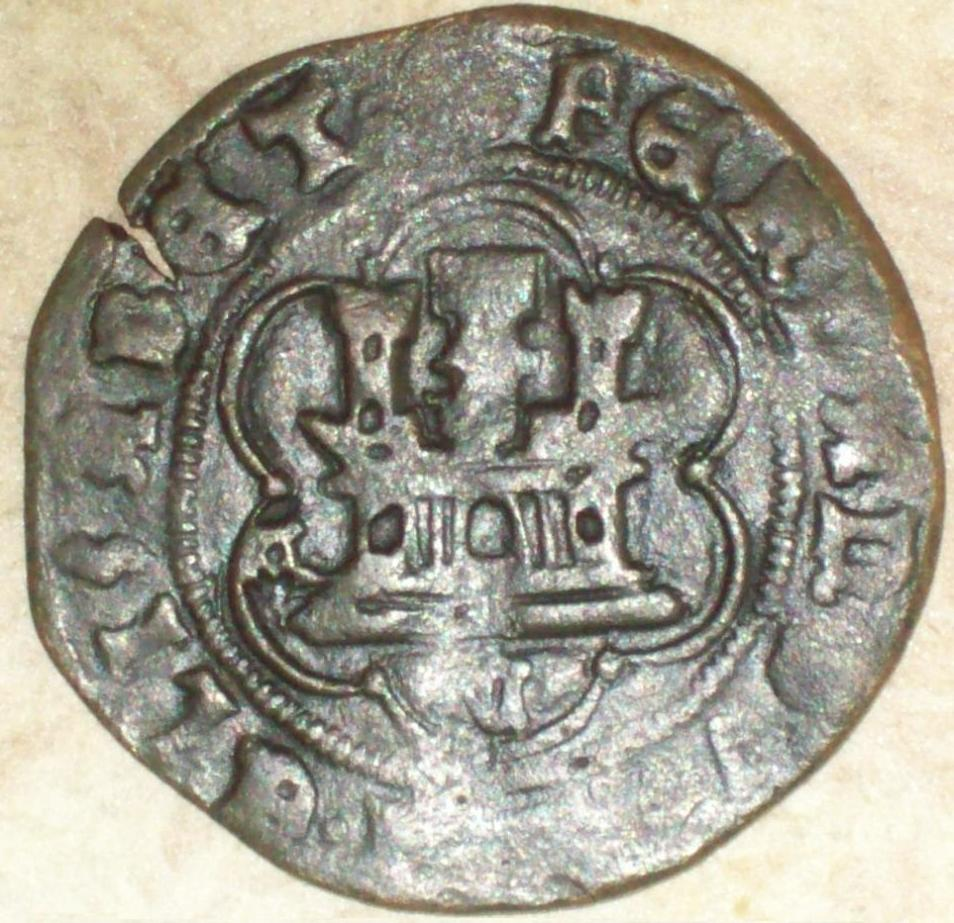
obverse of 4 Maravedies

The gold dinar was first struck in Iberia under Abd-ar-Rahman III, Emir of Córdoba (912–961). During the 11th century, the dinar became known as the morabit, morabotin or morabetino throughout Europe. In the 12th century, it was copied by the Christian rulers Sancho I of Portugal (1154–1211), Ferdinand II of León (1157–1188) and Alfonso VIII of Castile (1158–1214). The new version of the coin became known as the morabitino in the Kingdom of Portugal and as maravedí in the remaining Iberian Kingdoms. Alfonso's gold marabotin or maravedí retained inscriptions in Arabic but had the letters ALF at the bottom. It weighed about 3.8 grams.

In Castile, the maravedí de oro soon became the accounting unit for gold, alongside the sueldo (from solidus) for silver and the dinero (from [denarius]) for billon (vellón in Spanish).

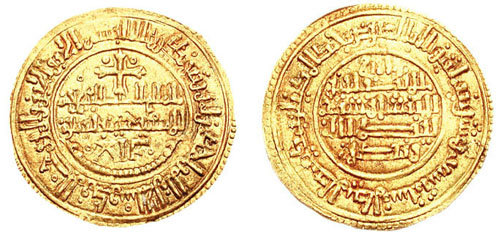
Gold Maravedies issued in Toledo by Alfonso VIII of Castile, 1191

The gold content of the maravedí fell to a gram during the reign of James I of Aragon (1213–1276), and it kept falling, eventually becoming a silver coin under Alfonso X of Castile (1252–1284). By this time the word maravedí was being used for a specific coin officially, for any coin colloquially, and as a synonym for money itself, resulting in a certain confusion in interpreting 13th-century references to money, values, and coinage.

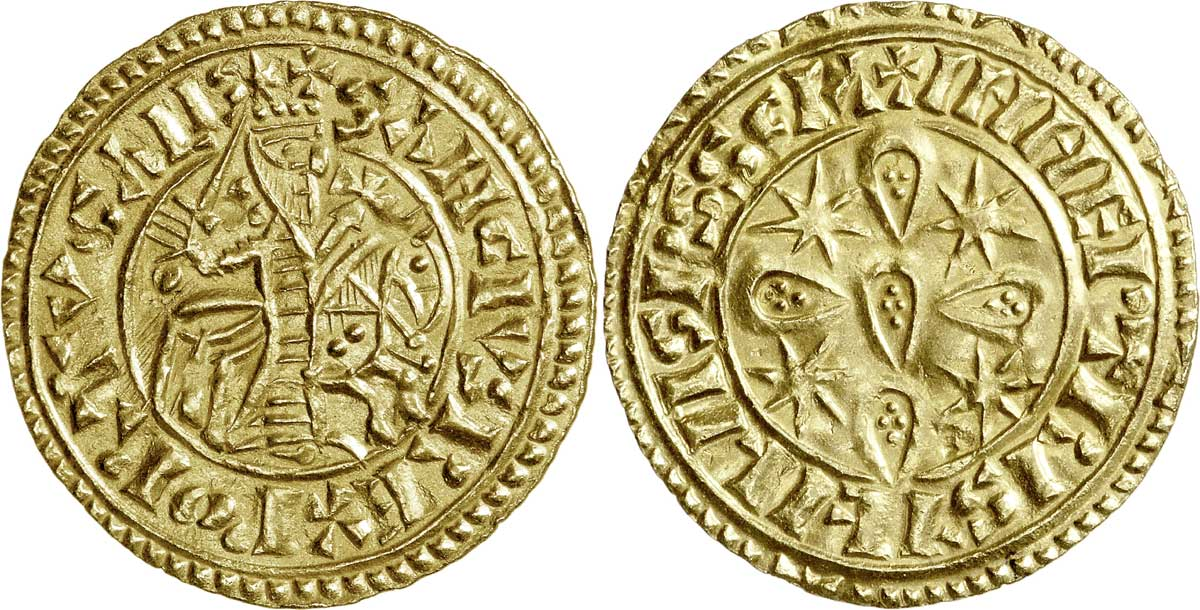
Morabitino coins issued by Sancho I of Portugal

Alfonso X, for example, made three issues of billon, in each of which the new coin was called a maravedí. His basic silver coin of 1258–1271 was also called a maravedí (maravedí de plata). It weighed 6.00 g and contained 3.67 g of fine silver. It was worth 30 dineros. At that time, the money of account was the Maravedí of 15 Sueldos or 180 Dineros, so that one maravedí as an accounting unit was worth six silver maravedí coins.

The silver maravedí money of account represented (according to one interpretation) about 22 g of silver in 1258. This had fallen to 11 g by 1271, to 3 g by 1286, and to 1.91 g in 1303. The gold maravedí had disappeared as a money of account by 1300. The maravedí de plata (silver maravedí) gradually came to be used as money of account for larger sums, for the value of gold coins, and for the mint price of silver, and eventually it supplanted the sueldo as the main accounting unit. Alfonso XI (1312–1350) did not call any of his coins a maravedí, and henceforth the term was used only as a unit of account and not as the name of a coin.

In 1537 it became the smallest Spanish unit of account, the thirty-fourth part of a real. In the new world, nonetheless, there are documents which testify to the reduction of their value to less than the thirtieth part of a real. This reduction was on account of the cost and risk of their transportation from Spain, before the establishment of the first mint houses of Mexico and Santo Domingo. The maravedí remained a money of account in Spain until 1847.

After Spain's discovery of the Americas, copper maravedís, along with silver reales, were the first coins struck in Spain for the purpose of circulation in the New World colonies. These coins, minted with a special design for specific use of the Americas, were first coined in Seville in 1505 for shipment to the colonial island of Hispaniola the following year, thus giving these coins their distinction as the first coins for the New World. By 1531 these coins were still being minted, by now in both Seville and Burgos. These maravedís were used as Spanish Colonial change for smaller transactions and after mints were later established in the New World, in both Mexico (ordered in 1535, production began in 1536) and Santo Domingo (ordered in 1536, production began in 1542), coins of this type were also minted there.

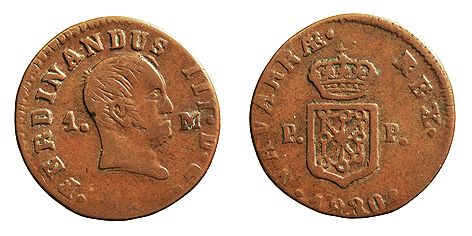
The Fernando VII maravedí from 1830.

== See also ==
- Cornado
