= Escudo =

Currency historically used in Portugal and its colonies

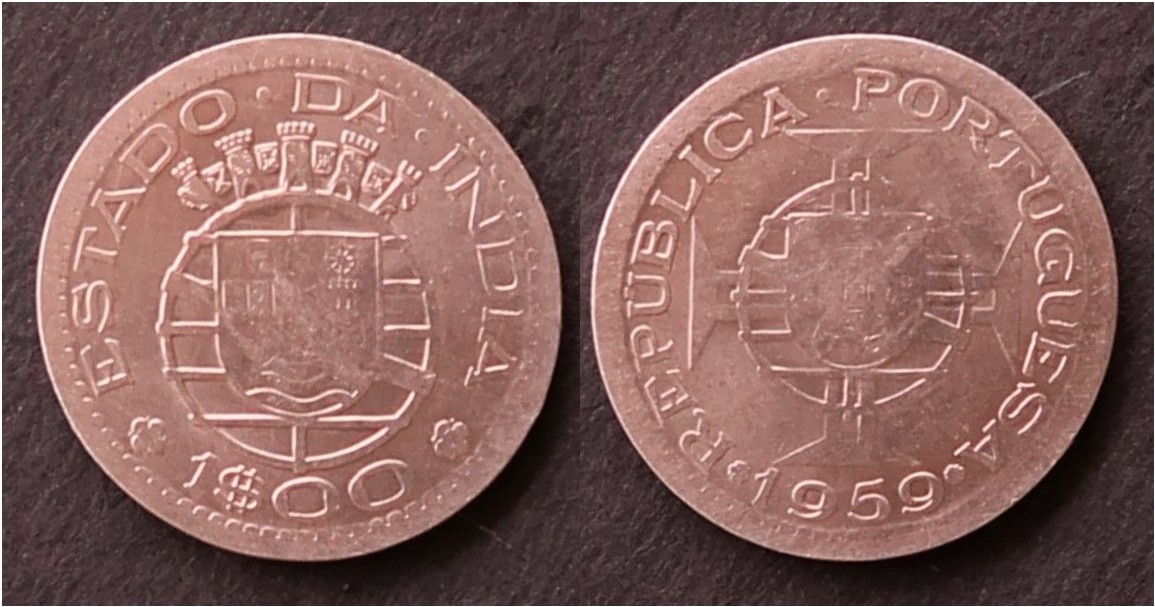
1 Indian Escudo (1959)
Obverse: Lettering "ESTADO·DA·INDIA" [transl. State of India], face value with the Coat of arms of Portugal in the center.	Reverse: Lettering "REPÚBLICA · PORTUGUESA" [transl. Portuguese Republic], with the year and the Coat of arms of Portugal in the center.
6,000,000 coins minted. This coin was from Portuguese State of India which lasted till 1961

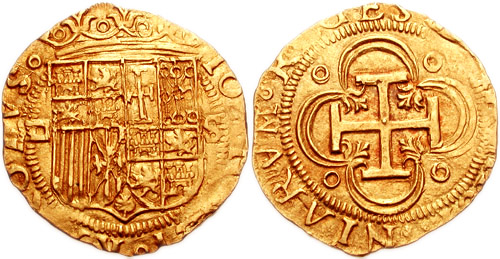
Juana and Charles I. 1504–1555. AV Escudo (24 mm, 3.38 g, 9 h). Seville mint.

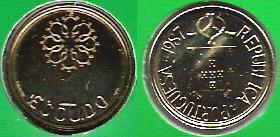
Portuguese coin of 1 escudo, 1987

The escudo (Portuguese: 'shield') is a unit of currency which is used in Cape Verde, and which has been used by Portugal, Spain and their colonies. The original coin was worth 16 silver reais. The Cape Verdean escudo is, and the Portuguese escudo was, subdivided into 100 centavos. Its symbol is the Cifrão, a letter S with two vertical bars superimposed used between the units and the subdivision (for example, 2550).

In Spain and its colonies, the escudo refers to a gold coin worth sixteen reales de plata or forty reales de vellón.

== Currencies named "escudo" ==
=== Circulating ===
- Cape Verdean escudo

=== Obsolete ===
- Angolan escudo
- Chilean escudo
- French écu
- Mozambican escudo
- Portuguese escudo
- Portuguese Guinean escudo
- Portuguese Indian escudo
- Portuguese Timorese escudo
- São Tomé and Príncipe escudo
- Spanish escudo
