= Portuguese Timorese pataca =

Currency of Portuguese Timor between 1894 and 1958

Pataca timorense (Portuguese)

Unit
- Symbol: $

Denominations
- Subunit
- 1/100: avo
- Banknotes: 5, 10, 20, 50 avos, $1, $5, $10, $20, $25, $50, $100
- Coins: 10, 20, 50 avos

Demographics
- User(s): Portuguese Timor

Issuance
- Central bank: Banco Nacional Ultramarino
- This infobox shows the latest status before this currency was rendered obsolete.

The pataca was a monetary unit of account used in Portuguese Timor between 1894 and 1958, except for the period 1942–1945, when the occupying Japanese forces introduced the Netherlands Indies gulden and the roepiah. As in the case of the Macanese pataca which is still in use today, the East Timor unit was based on the silver Mexican dollar coins which were prolific in the wider region in the 19th century. These Mexican dollar coins were in turn the lineal descendants of the Spanish pieces of eight which had been introduced to the region by the Portuguese through Portuguese Malacca, and by the Spanish through the Manila Galleon trade.

== History ==
The pataca was first introduced in Portuguese Macau and Portuguese Timor in the year 1894, but only as a unit of account for the silver Mexican dollar coins that circulated widely in the region at that time. In 1894, Macau and Portuguese Timor constituted one single administrative entity, but in 1896 Portuguese Timor became autonomous from Macau. In those days there was no single currency in circulation in Macau and East Timor, and trade was dominated by the silver dollar coins, not only of Mexico, but also of China, as well as the British silver trade dollars that were minted for use in Hong Kong and the Straits Settlements. In East Timor, the 2 1/2 gulden coin of the neighbouring Netherlands East Indies also corresponded to a silver dollar. In 1901 in Macau, it was decided to create a purely local currency, and the authorities granted the Banco Nacional Ultramarino exclusive rights to print legal tender banknotes. These pataca banknotes were launched in 1906 at a sterling value of 2s 4d (2 shillings and 4 pence) — the same as the new Straits dollar that was issued in that same year. As in the Straits Settlements, all foreign coinage was outlawed, with the intention that the new currencies should establish their own market values. The Chinese were suspicious of these paper patacas, being accustomed to using silver for barter, and so the paper patacas always circulated at a discount in relation to the silver dollar coins. These Macau banknotes also circulated in East Timor, but in 1912 they were supplemented by local Timor issues for the first time. While the pataca continued at a discount to the silver dollars that were used in silver standard countries such as China and Hong Kong, the Straits dollar was pegged to sterling in a gold exchange standard, so the two currencies then floated apart. In 1935, when China and Hong Kong abandoned the silver standard, the pataca was pegged to the Portuguese escudo at a rate of 1 pataca = 5.5 escudos, making it equivalent to the British shilling (since £1 was then equivalent to 110 escudos) and putting it officially at a 3d sterling discount in relation to the Hong Kong unit, and at a 1s 4d discount in relation to the Straits dollar.

In 1942, during the Second World War, the pataca was replaced by Japanese issues of the Netherlands Indies gulden at par. The gulden had been on the gold standard until the 1930s, and had risen in value against the pataca so that the pataca was now closer in value to 1 gulden rather than the 2 1/2 gulden rate that had prevailed around 1900. When the pataca was reintroduced in 1945, it was pegged to the Portuguese escudo at a rate of 5.5 escudos = 1 pataca (changed to 5 escudos = 1 pataca in 1949) and fractional coins denominated in avos (100 avos = 1 pataca) were issued for the first time. In 1951, minting of avo coins ceased, even though in 1952 a full set of pataca coinage, including coins denominated in avos and also a pataca coin, was issued in Macau.

In 1958, the pataca was replaced by the escudo at the rate of 1 pataca = 5.60 escudos.

In 1975, Portuguese Timor was invaded by Indonesia, and Indonesian currency was introduced. When this territory was established as an independent state in 2002, the US dollar was made the official currency. The US dollar was also descended from the Spanish pieces of eight but it broke parity with the silver dollars of south-east Asia and Latin America following the great international silver devaluation of 1873.

== Coins ==
In 1945, bronze 10 avos, nickel-bronze 20 avos and silver 50 avos coins were introduced. The sizes of these coins matched the Portuguese 20 centavos and 1 and 2 1/2 escudos. Coins were issued until 1951.

== Banknotes ==
In 1912, the Banco Nacional Ultramarino introduced notes (dated 1910) in denominations of 1, 5, 10 and 20 patacas. 25 patacas notes from Macao also circulated. In 1940, notes of 5, 10 and 50 avos were introduced. Some of these notes were overprints of Macanese notes, as were the 5, 25 and 100 patacas notes introduced in 1945. The same year, specific issues for Timor were introduced in denominations of 1, 5, 10, 20 and 25 patacas, followed by 20 avos in 1948.

== Gallery ==
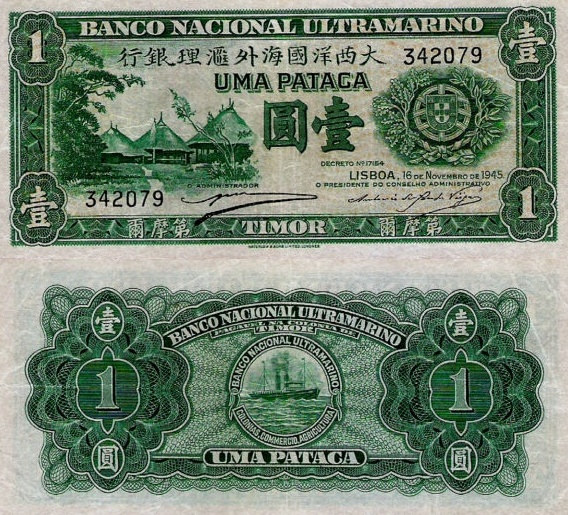
Portuguese Timor 1 pataca banknote.

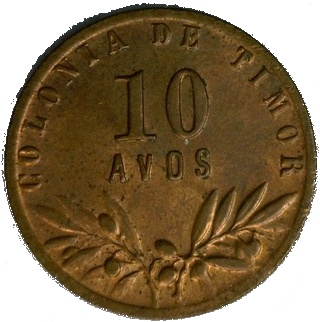
10 avos of Portuguese Timor.

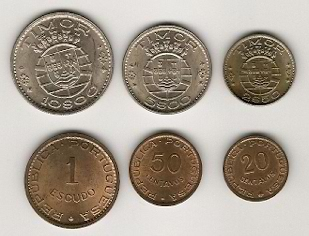
Portuguese Timor 20 Escudos 1967

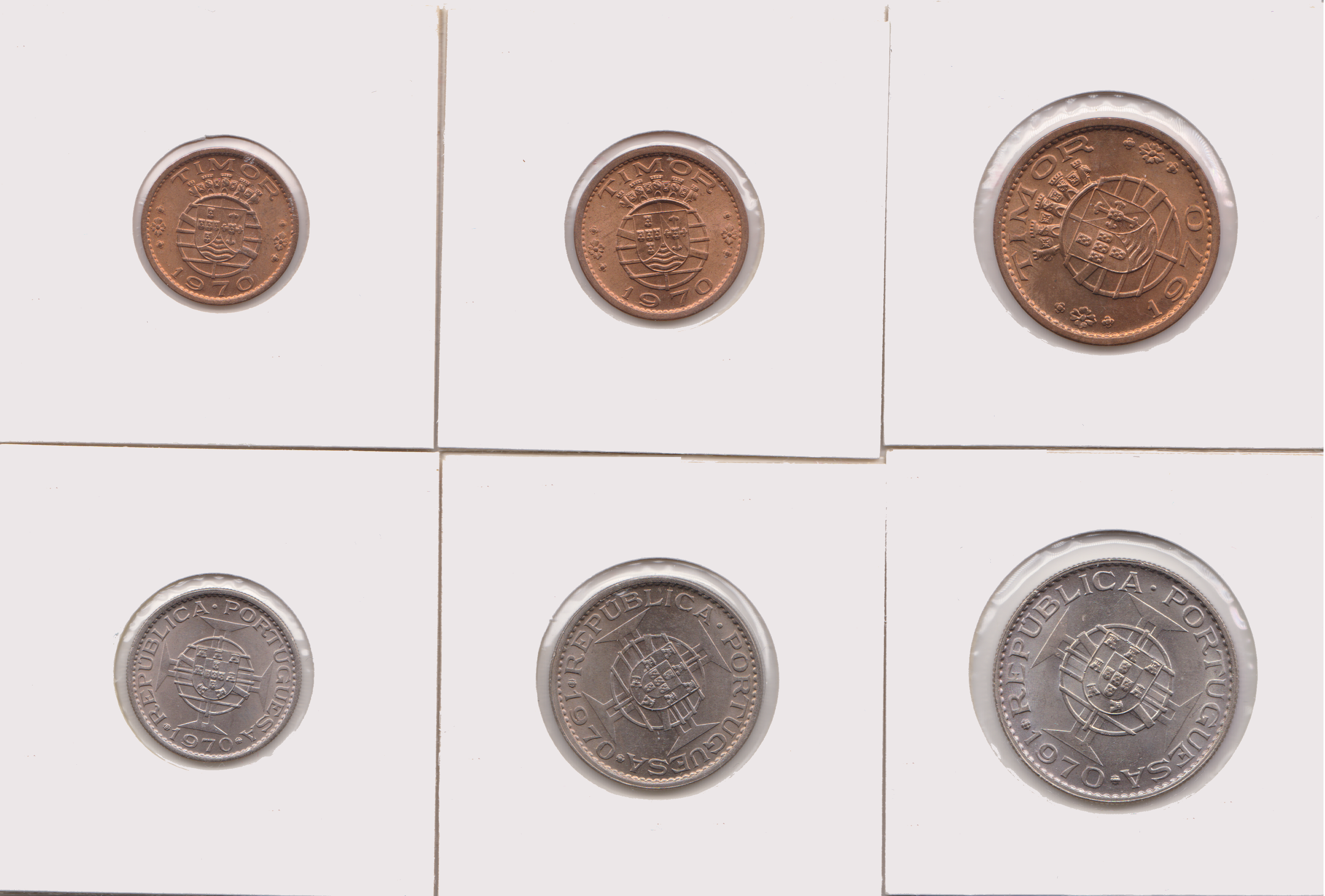
1970 Portuguese Timor escudos.

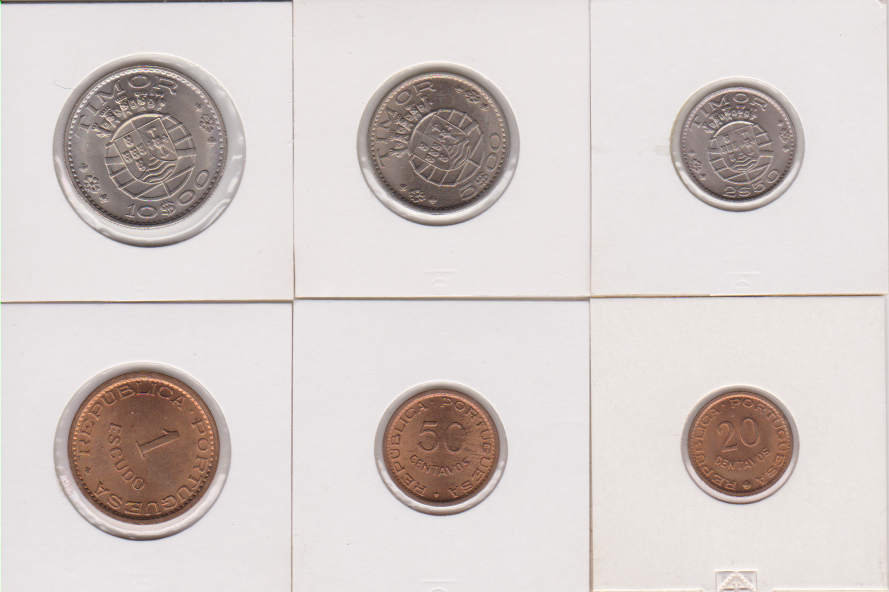
1970 Portuguese Timor escudos reverse.

== See also ==
- Macanese pataca
