= Dollar sign =

Monetary symbol used in many national currencies

$

Dollar sign
- Other names: Peso sign
- In Unicode: U+0024 $ DOLLAR SIGN (&dollar;)

Currency
- Currency: Many (see dollar, peso)

Graphical variants

The dollar sign ($; also known as the peso sign) is a currency symbol consisting of a capital ⟨S⟩ crossed with one or two vertical strokes ($ or depending on typeface), used to represent the base unit of account of various currencies around the world, including most currencies denominated "dollar" or "peso". The explicitly double-barred sign is called cifrão in the Portuguese language.

The sign is also used in several compound currency symbols, such as the Brazilian real (R$) and the United States dollar (US$): in local use, the nationality prefix is usually omitted. In countries that have other currency symbols, the US dollar is often assumed and the "US" prefix omitted.

The one- and two-stroke versions are often considered mere stylistic (typeface) variants, although in some places and epochs one of them may have been specifically assigned, by law or custom, to a specific currency. The Unicode computer encoding standard defines a single code for both.

In most English-speaking countries that use that symbol, it is placed to the left of the amount specified, e.g. "$1", read as "one dollar".

== History ==
=== Early history ===
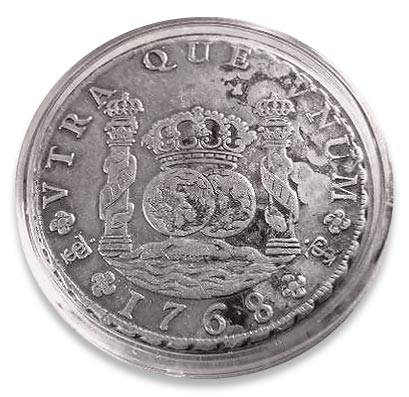
A piece of eight from the Potosí mint, showing the Pillars of Hercules with 'S' ribbons, and two "PTSI" monograms at about 4 and 8 o'clock around the edge

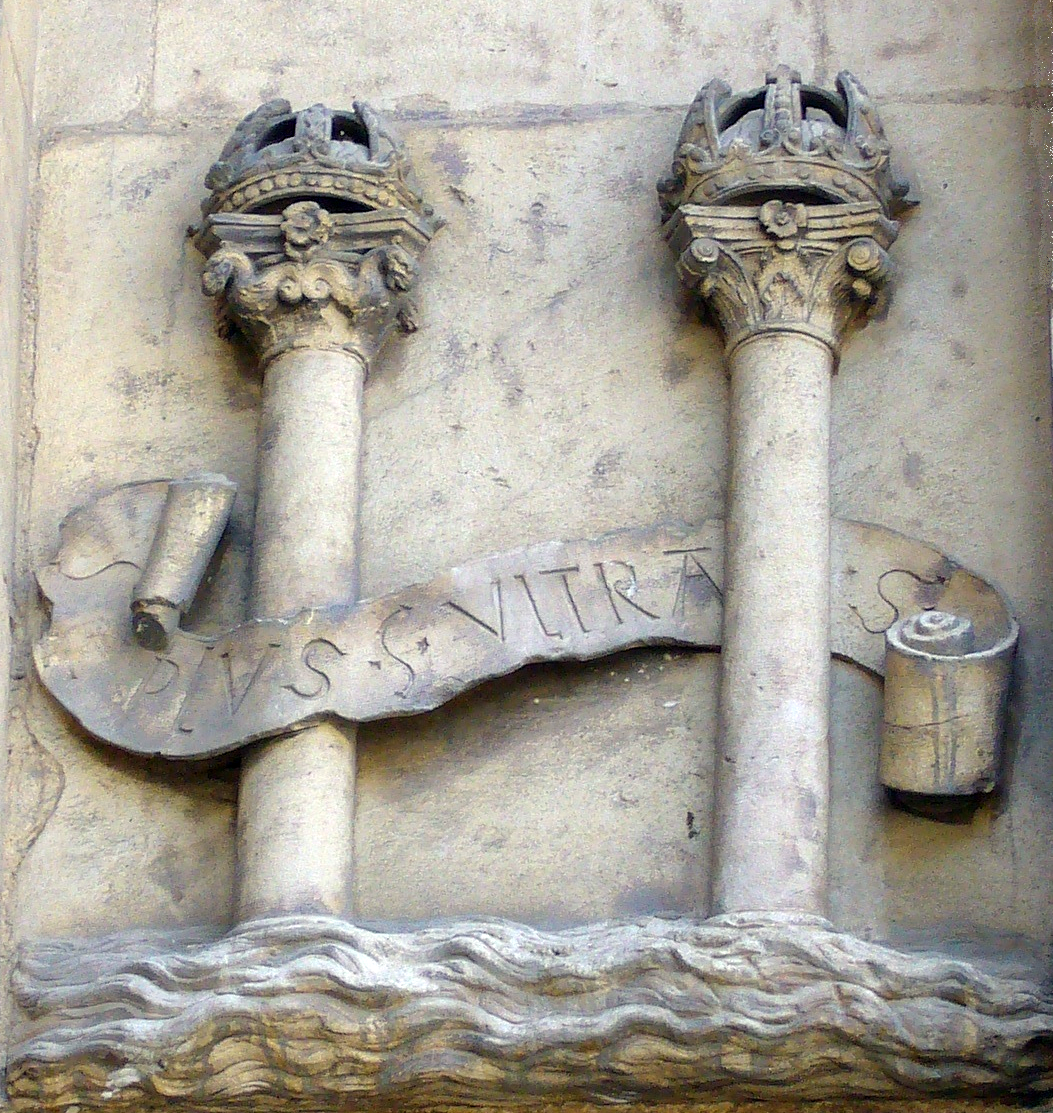
Iconic representation of the Pillars of Hercules with ribbon Plus Ultra ("further beyond"), in Seville (16th century).

How the dollar sign came to represent the Spanish American peso is uncertain. There are several competing hypotheses:

- The most widely accepted theory holds that among the very many latinate scribal abbreviations the dollar sign developed out of an abbreviation for the Spanish and Spanish-American p^{s} for pesos. A study of late 18th- and early 19th-century manuscripts shows that the s gradually came to be written over the p, developing into a close equivalent to the '$' mark. (Note: "The foreign coins remained in circulation [in the United States], and the more important among them, especially the Spanish (including the Mexican) dollars, were declared by Congress on 9 February 1793, to be legal tender. The dollar sign, '$', is connected with the peso, contrary to popular belief, which considers it to be an abbreviation of 'U.S.' The two parallel lines represented one of the many abbreviations of 'P,' and the 'S' indicated the plural. The abbreviation '$.' was also used for the peso, and is still used in Argentina." — Nussbaum (1957), p. 56) Oliver Pollock, a wealthy Irish trader and early supporter of the American Revolution, used the abbreviation "ps", sometimes run together in a way that almost exactly resembled the dollar sign, in a letter dated 1778. There are documents showing the common use of the two-stroke version in Portugal already by 1775.
- Another hypothesis derives the sign from a depiction of the Pillars of Hercules, a classical symbol for two sides of the Strait of Gibraltar, with a ribbon wrapped around each pillar (or both pillars) in the form of an 'S'. This device is a support element of the Spanish coat of arms, and appeared on the most common real de ocho coins circulating at the time in the Americas and Europe; namely, those minted at the Potosí mint in Bolivia, which operated from 1573–1825. Indeed, one of the names used for Spanish dollars in Qing Dynasty China was 雙柱; Shuāngzhù; 'double-pillar'.

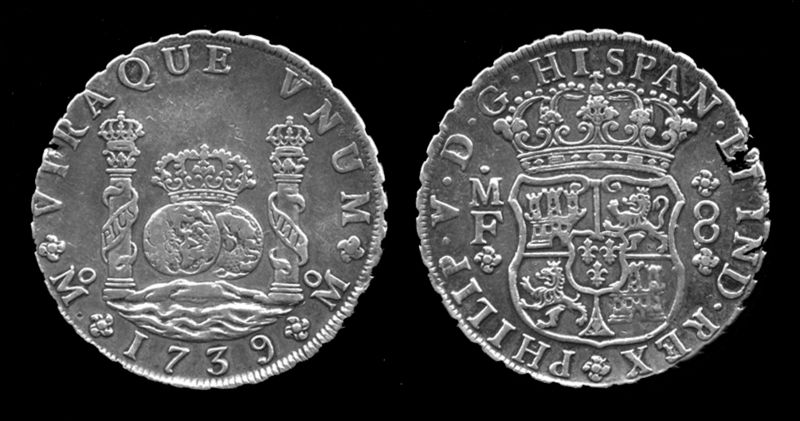
The Pillars of Hercules wrapped by a cloth band, on an 18th-century Spanish coin.

Development of the dollar sign, according to two hypotheses.

- A variant of the above theory claims that the sign comes from the mark of the mint at Potosí, where a large portion of the Spanish Empire's silver was mined. A feature on these coins were the letters "P T S I" superimposed. The core of this monogram is a (single-stroked) '$' sign.

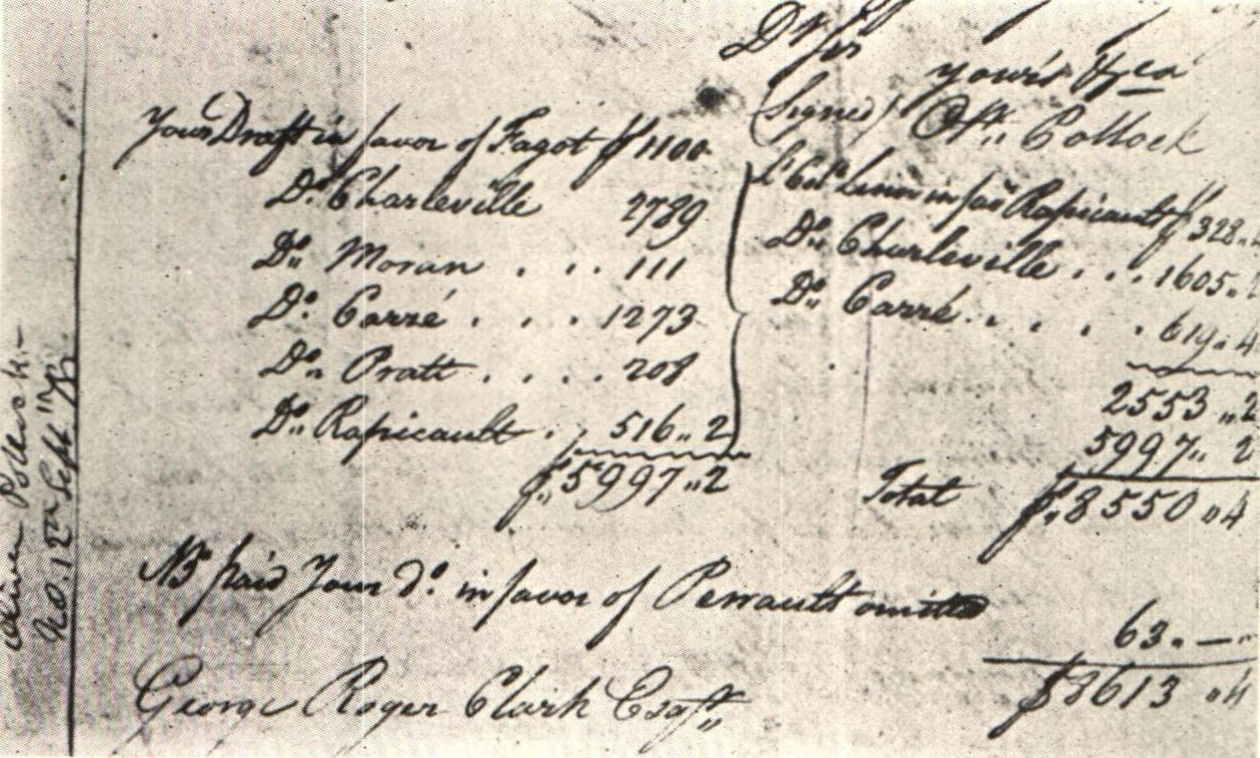
Dollar sign in letter from Sept. 12, 1778, by Oliver Pollock to George Roger Clark.

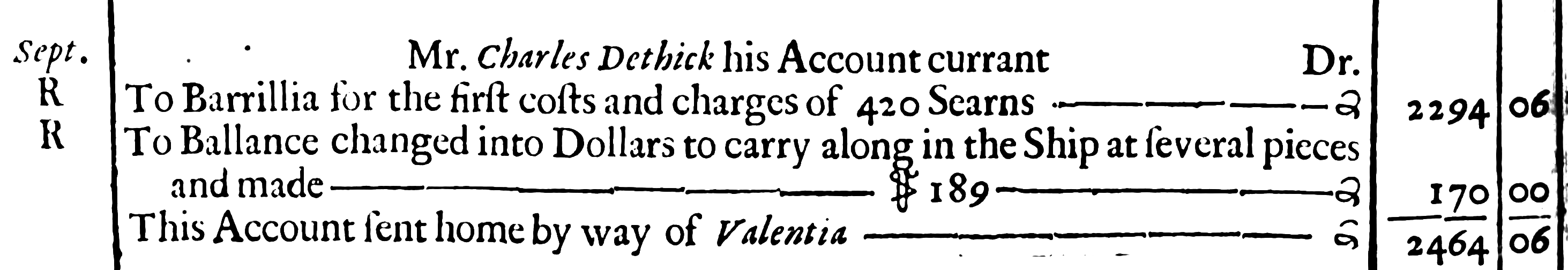
Sample ledger with a sign for dollar from John Collins 1686

- Yet another hypothesis notes that the English word "dollar" for the Spanish piece of eight originally came (through Dutch daalder) from Joachimsthaler or thaler, a similar large German silver coin that was widely used in Europe. It is therefore conjectured that the dollar sign derived from a symbol consisting of a superimposing 'S' and 'I' or 'J' that was used to denote the German silver coin. de Roover (1945) notes that such a symbol used for that dollar unit appears in the 1686 edition of An Introduction to Merchants' Accounts by John Collins printed at the end of Gerard de Malynes’ Lex Mercatoria and was also used for the mark (Hamburg mark banco) in particular in the first half of the 19th century. Alternatively, the symbol could have come from a snake and cross emblem on the thaler coins.

=== Less likely theories ===
The following theories seem to have been discredited or contradicted by documentary evidence:

- James Alton James proposed that the symbol with two strokes was adapted from a 1778 design by financier Robert Morris, found in his letters to Pollock.
- Henrietta Larson suggested that the sign could derive from a combination of the Greek character "psi" (ψ) and 'S'.
- Another theory claims that the sign started off as a monogram of "US", with a narrow 'U' superimposed on the 'S'; the bottom part of the 'U' would have been lost, producing the dollar sign with two vertical lines. Florian Cajori found this theory mentioned in 1876 letters to the journal Notes and Queries. Henry R. Towne begins his 1886 essay on management stating this theory. This was also claimed by Ayn Rand in her 1957 novel Atlas Shrugged; in Rand's conjecture is that the "US" monogram was imprinted on the money bags used by the United States Mint.
- Seijas & Frederick (2017), pp. 3–4 noted that the captors of slaves in Spanish territories sometimes branded enslaved people with a symbol very similar to a one-barred dollar sign. Esclavo is Spanish for "slave," and clavo means nail. A dollar sign would then be 'S' + clavo, ('Ꞌ').
- A theory often cited in Portuguese speaking countries is that the 'S' part of the doubly-stroked sign is a schematic representation of the path followed by the Umayyad Caliphate general Tariq Ibn Ziyad in his conquest of the Visigoth kingdom in 711 CE, and the two strokes represent the Pillars of Hercules that he would have crossed along that path. That symbol would have been engraved in coins commemorating his victory, and then became symbolic of currency in general.
- Encyclopaedia Britannica describes the hypothesis that the symbol is derived from the Arabic numeral "8" in reference to the Spanish dollar or "piece of eight" as a "popular theory" for which there is a lack of documentary evidence.

=== 1770s - present ===
The symbol appears in business correspondence in the 1770s from the West Indies referring to the Spanish American peso, also known as "Spanish dollar" or "piece of eight" in British America. The Spanish coins provided the model for the currency that the United States adopted in 1792, and for the larger coins of the new Spanish American republics, such as the Mexican peso, Argentine peso, Peruvian real, and Bolivian sol coins.

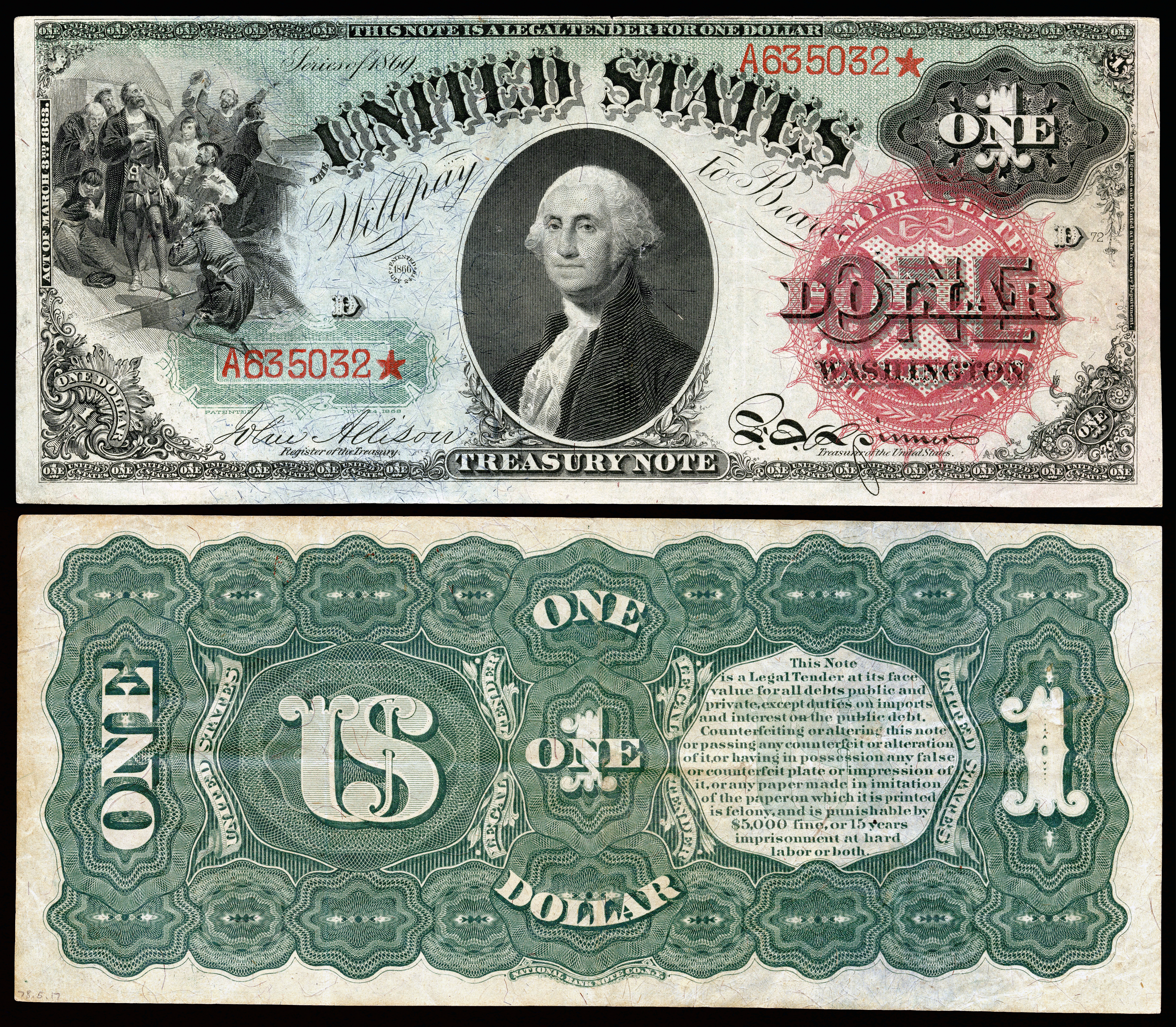
Reverse side (lower) of $1 United States note, 1869 series ("greenback"), showing "US" ≈ '$' monogram.

With the Coinage Act of 1792, the United States Congress created the U.S. dollar, defining "each to be of the value of a Spanish milled dollar as the same is now current" but a variety of foreign coins were deemed to be legal tender until the Coinage Act of 1857 ended this status.

The earliest U.S. dollar coins did not have any dollar symbol. The first occurrence in print is claimed to be from 1790s, by a Philadelphia printer Archibald Binny, creator of the Monticello typeface. The $1 United States Note issued by the United States in 1869 included a large symbol consisting of a 'U' with the right bar overlapping an 'S' like a single-bar dollar sign, as well as a very small double-stroke dollar sign in the legal warning against forgery (see image).

== Currencies that use the dollar sign ==
=== As symbol of the currency ===
The numerous currencies called "dollar" use the dollar sign to express money amounts. The sign is also generally used for the many currencies called "peso" (except the Philippine peso, which uses the symbol "₱"). Within a country the dollar/peso sign may be used alone when referring to the country's own currency. In other cases, and to avoid ambiguity in international usage, it is usually combined with other glyphs, e.g. CA$ or Can$ for Canadian dollar. Particularly in professional contexts, the unambiguous ISO 4217 three letter code (AUD, MXN, USD, etc.) is preferred.

The dollar sign, alone or in combination with other glyphs, is or was used to denote several currencies with other names, including:

- Brazilian cruzeiro (various currencies, all defunct): ₢$, CR, Cr, NCr, etc.
- Brazilian real: R$
- Ethiopian birr (until 1976): E$
- Macanese pataca: MOP$
- Nicaraguan córdoba: C$
- Samoan tālā (a transliteration of the word dollar): $
- Singapore dollar: $ or S$
- Tongan paʻanga: T$
- Malaya and British Borneo dollar (1957–1967): $
- Malaysian ringgit (1967–1997): $, M$, M
- New Taiwan dollar: NT$, 元, $
- South Vietnamese đồng (1953–1975): $,

==== Prefix or suffix ====
In the United States, Mexico, Australia, Argentina, Chile, Colombia, New Zealand, Hong Kong, Pacific Island nations, and English-speaking Canada, the sign is written before the number ("$5"), (Note: This '$-first' order is inconsistent with use of the cent symbol ('¢'), which is written after the number in most (all?) countries that use it, e.g., "25¢".) even though, when the word is written out or spoken, it is put after the number ("five dollars", "cinco pesos"). The exception is French-speaking Canada, where the dollar symbol usually appears after the number, the same as the spoken order, e.g., "5 $" for "cinq dollars".

=== Use in the Portuguese Empire ===
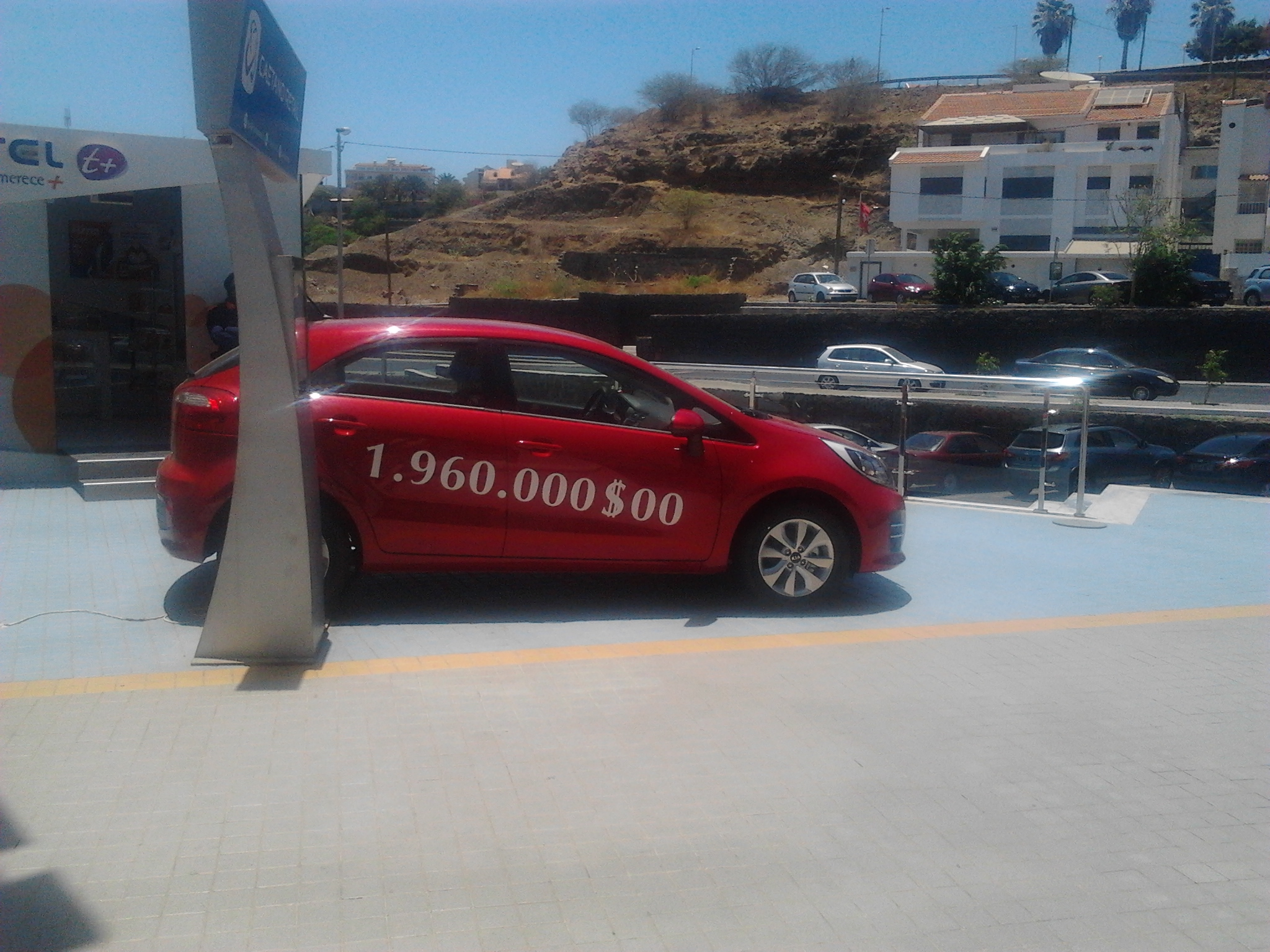
Car for sale in Cape Verde, showing use of the cifrão as decimals separator

In Portugal, Brazil, and other parts of the Portuguese Empire, the two-stroke variant of the sign named cifrão (Portuguese pronunciation: [siˈfɾɐ̃w]; plural cifrões) has been used as the thousands separator in the national currency, the real (plural "réis", abbreviated "Rs."). For instance, 123500 would be equivalent to 123500 réis. This usage is attested in 1775, but may be older by a century or more. The cifrão is always written with two vertical lines like, and is the official sign of the Cape Verdean escudo (ISO 4217: CVE).

In 1911, Portugal redefined the national currency as the escudo, worth 1000 réis, and divided into 100 centavos; but the cifrão continued to be used as the decimal separator, so that 12350 meant 123.50 escudos or 123 escudos and 50 centavos. This usage ended in 2002 when the country switched to the euro. (A similar scheme to use a letter symbol instead of a decimal point is used by the RKM code in electrical engineering since 1952.)

Cape Verde, a republic and former Portuguese colony, similarly switched from the real to their local escudo and centavos in 1914, and retains the cifrão usage as decimals separator as of 2021. Local versions of the Portuguese escudo were for a time created also for other overseas colonies, including East Timor (1958–1975), Portuguese India (1958–1961), Angola (1914–1928 and 1958–1977), Mozambique (1914–1980), Portuguese Guinea (1914–1975), and São Tomé and Príncipe (1914–1977); all using the cifrão as decimals separator.

Brazil retained the real and the cifrão as thousands separator until 1942, when it switched to the Brazilian cruzeiro, with comma as the decimals separator. The dollar sign, officially with one stroke but often rendered with two, was retained as part of the currency symbol "Cr$", so one would write Cr$13,50 for 13 cruzeiros and 50 centavos.

The cifrão was formerly used by the Portuguese escudo (ISO: PTE) before its replacement by the euro and by the Portuguese Timor escudo (ISO: TPE) before its replacement by the Indonesian rupiah and the US dollar. In Portuguese and Cape Verdean usage, the cifrão is placed as a decimal point between the escudo and centavo values. The name originates in the Arabic ṣifr (صِفْر), meaning 'zero'.

Outside the Portuguese cultural sphere, the South Vietnamese đồng before 1975 used a method similar to the cifrão to separate values of đồng from its decimal subunit xu. For example, 750 meant 7 đồng and 50 xu.

== One stroke vs. two strokes ==
Double-barred dollar or Cifrão sign

In some places and at some times, the one- and two-stroke variants have been used in the same contexts to distinguish between the U.S. dollar and other local currency, such as the former Portuguese escudo.

However, such usage is not standardized, and the Unicode specification considers the two versions as graphic variants of the same symbol—a typeface design choice. Computer and typewriter keyboards usually have a single key for that sign, and many character encodings (including ASCII and Unicode) reserve a single numeric code for it. Indeed, dollar signs in the same digital document may be rendered with one or two strokes, if different computer fonts are used, but the underlying codepoint U+0024 (ASCII 36_{10}) remains unchanged.

When a specific variant is not mandated by law or custom, the choice is usually a matter of expediency or aesthetic preference. Both versions were used in the US in the 18th century. (An 1861 Civil War-era advertisement depicts the two-stroked symbol as a snake.) The two-stroke version seems to be generally less popular today, though used in some "old-style" fonts like Baskerville.

== Use in computer software ==
Because of its use in early American computer applications such as business accounting, the dollar sign is almost universally present in computer character sets, and thus has been appropriated for many purposes unrelated to money in programming languages and command languages.

=== Encoding ===
The dollar sign "$" has ASCII and Unicode code point U+0024 (in Unicode's Latin-1 block inherited from ASCII).

- U+0024 $ DOLLAR SIGN (&dollar;) (Note: As of April 2022, HTML5 is the only version of HTML that has a named entity for the dollar sign.)

There are no separate encodings for one- and two-line variants. The choice is typeface-dependent; they are allographs. However, there are three other code points that originate from other East Asian standards: the Taiwanese small form variant, the CJK fullwidth form, and the Japanese emoji. The glyphs for these code points are typically larger or smaller than the primary code point, but the difference is mostly aesthetic or typographic, and the meanings of the symbols are the same.

- U+FE69 ﹩ SMALL DOLLAR SIGN
- U+FF04 ＄ FULLWIDTH DOLLAR SIGN
- U+1F4B2 💲 HEAVY DOLLAR SIGN

However, for usage as the special character in various computing applications (see following sections), U+0024 is typically the only code that is recognized.

Support for the two-line variant varies. As of 2019, the Unicode standard considers the distinction between one- and two-bar dollar signs a stylistic distinction between fonts, and has no separate code point for the cifrão. The symbol is not in the October 2019 "pipeline", though it has been requested formally.

Among others, the following fonts display a double-bar dollar sign for code point 0024: regular-weight Baskerville, Big Caslon, Bodoni MT, Garamond: ($)

In LaTeX, with the textcomp package installed, the cifrão can be input using the command \textdollaroldstyle. However, because of font substitution and the lack of a dedicated code point, the author of an electronic document who uses one of these fonts intending to represent a cifrão cannot be sure that every reader will see a double-bar glyph rather than the single barred version. Because of the continued lack of support in Unicode, a single bar dollar sign is frequently employed in its place even for official purposes. Where there is any risk of misunderstanding, the ISO 4217 three-letter code is used.

==== Japanese ====
The character U+3326 ㌦ SQUARE DORU is a squared word version of ドル (doru "dollar", in Japanese). The character U+5F17 弗 CJK UNIFIED IDEOGRAPH-5F17 has formerly been repurposed as a symbol for dollars in Japan because of its visual similarity. It was also read as doru.

=== Programming languages ===
- In BASIC, $ is appended to a variable name to define that variable's data type as a character string, for example, H$="Hello, world!". In discussion, the variable H$ would be pronounced "H string".
- $ is prefixed to names to define variables in the PHP language, the AutoIt automation script language, and the Sass stylesheet language, scalar variables in the Perl language (see sigil (computer programming)), and global variables in the Ruby language. In Perl programming this includes scalar elements of arrays $array[7] and hashes $hash{foo}.
- In Unix shells, and later in other programming languages, $ introduces an expression that should be evaluated to yield text. Languages that have adopted this convention include Perl, JavaScript, C#, Scala, Groovy and Kotlin. Other languages, including Java and Python, use it to mark the place where the result of an expression elsewhere should be inserted into text.
- $ is used for defining hexadecimal constants in some variants of assembly language (such as the Motorola 6800, Motorola 68000 and MOS Technology 6502 assembly languages), in Pascal and in Pascal-like languages such as Free Pascal and Delphi.
- $ is used in the ALGOL 68 language to delimit transput format regions.
- $ is used in the TeX typesetting language to delimit mathematical regions.
- In many versions of FORTRAN 66, $ could be used as an alternative to a quotation mark for delimiting strings.
- In PL/M, $ can be used to put a visible separation between words in compound identifiers. For example, Some$Name refers to the same thing as SomeName.
- In Haskell, $ is used as a function application operator.
- In an AutoHotkey script, a hotkey declared with $ is not triggered by a 'Send' command elsewhere in the script.
- The jQuery library defines $ as its main symbol, primarily as a function that queries a web page for one or more HTML elements, but also with other utilities attached to it as properties like $.ajax. The Prototype.js library defines it similarly for querying.
- In ASP.NET, the dollar sign used in a tag in the web page indicates an expression will follow it. The expression that follows is .NET language-agnostic, as it will work with C#, VB.NET, or any CLR supported language.
- In Java, $ can appear inside a class name in a Java class file due to name mangling. For example, if a class Outer has an inner class Inner, the compiled class file will be named Outer$Inner.class.
- In Erlang, the dollar sign precedes character literals. The dollar sign as a character can be written $$.
- In COBOL the $ sign is used in the Picture clause to depict a floating currency symbol as the left most character. The default symbol is $; however, if the CURRENCY= or CURRENCY SIGN clause is specified, many other symbols can be used.
- In some assembly languages, such as MIPS, the $ sign is used to represent registers.
- In Honeywell 6000 series assembler, the $ sign, when used as an address, meant the address of the instruction in which it appeared.
- In CMS-2, the $ sign is used as a statement terminator.
- In R, the $ sign is used as a subsetting operator.
- In Q (programming language from Kx Systems), the $ sign is used as a casting/padding/enumeration/conditional operator.
- In Svelte, the $ sign can be used to mark reactive statements.

=== Operating systems ===
- In CP/M and subsequently in all versions of 86-DOS and MS-DOS compatible operating systems, $ marks the end of text displayed with system function 9. CP/M developer Gary Kildall never explained the choice and once pointedly remarked that he knew the reason while Bill Gates did not. Prior uses of $ for the "end of line" or "end of text" include JOVIAL, CMS-2, the QED editor and DECsystem-10 (a known influence on CP/M), which displayed the character to confirm that the user pressed the escape key to complete a line of input.
- In Windows, $ is appended to the share name to hide a shared folder or resource. For example, \\server\share will be visible to other computers on a network, while \\server\share$ will be accessible only by explicit reference. Hiding a shared folder or resource will not alter its access permissions but may render it inaccessible to programs or other functions which rely on its visibility. Most administrative shares are hidden in this way.
- In the LDAP directory access protocol, $ is used as a line separator in various standard entry attributes such as postalAddress.
- In the UNIVAC EXEC 8 operating system, $ means "system". It is appended to entities such as the names of system files, the "sender" name in messages sent by the operator, and the default names of system-created files (like compiler output) when no specific name is specified (e.g., TPF$, NAME$, etc.)
- In RISC OS, $ is used in system variables to separate the application name from the variables specific to that application. For example Draw$Dir specifies the directory where the !Draw application is located. It is also used to refer to the root directory of a file system.

=== Applications ===
- Excel and other spreadsheet software use the dollar sign ($) to denote a fixed row, fixed column reference, or an absolute cell reference.
- The dollar sign introduces a subfield delimiter in computer coding of library catalog records.
- $ matches the end of a line or string in sed, grep, and POSIX and Perl regular expressions, as well as the end of a line or the file in text editors ed, ex, vi, pico, and derivatives.

== Other uses ==
The symbol is sometimes used derisively, in place of the letter S, to indicate greed or excess money such as in "Micro$oft", "Di$ney", "Chel$ea" and "GW$"; or supposed overt Americanization as in "$ky". The dollar sign is also used intentionally to stylize names such as A$AP Rocky, Ke$ha, and Ty Dolla $ign or words such as ¥€$. In 1872, Ambrose Bierce referred to California governor Leland Stanford as $tealand Landford.

In Scrabble notation, a dollar sign is placed after a word to indicate that it is valid according to the North American word lists, but not according to the British word lists.

A dollar symbol is used as unit of reactivity for a nuclear reactor, 0 $ being the threshold of slow criticality, meaning a steady reaction rate, while 1 $ is the threshold of prompt criticality, which means a nuclear excursion or explosion.

In the 1993 version of the Turkmen Latin alphabet $ was used as a transliteration of the Cyrillic letter Ш, in 1999 was replaced by the letter Ş.

In mathematics, the $ sign is used as a Superfactorial. For example, 5$ = 5! x 4! x 3! x 2! x 1! = 120 x 24 x 6 x 2 x 1 which would be 34,560.

== See also ==
- List of circulating currencies – includes their currency signs where recognized
- List of emoticons – for use of the $ sign in emoticons
