= Portuguese escudo =

Currency of Portugal from 1911 to 2002

escudo português (Portuguese)
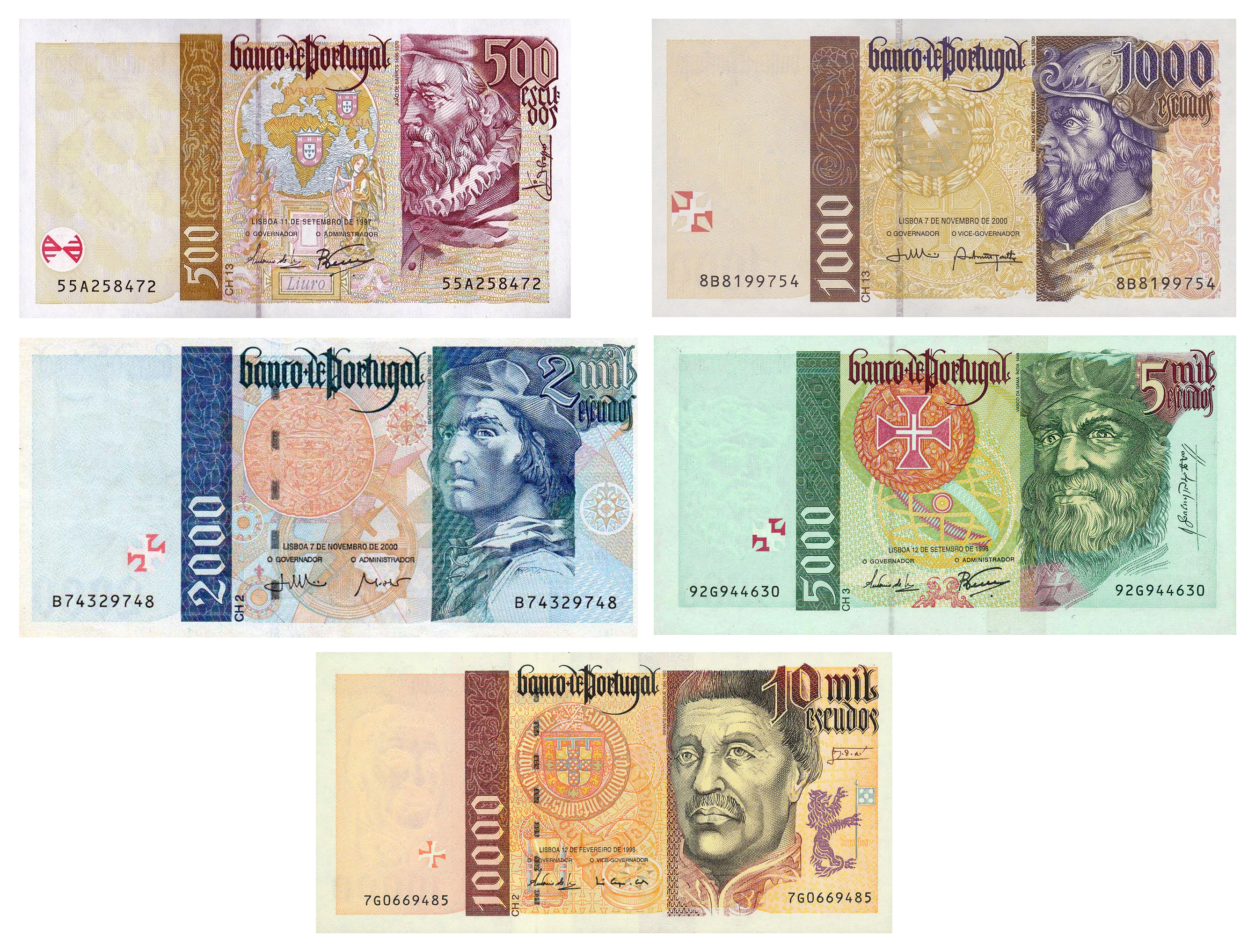
Last escudo banknotes
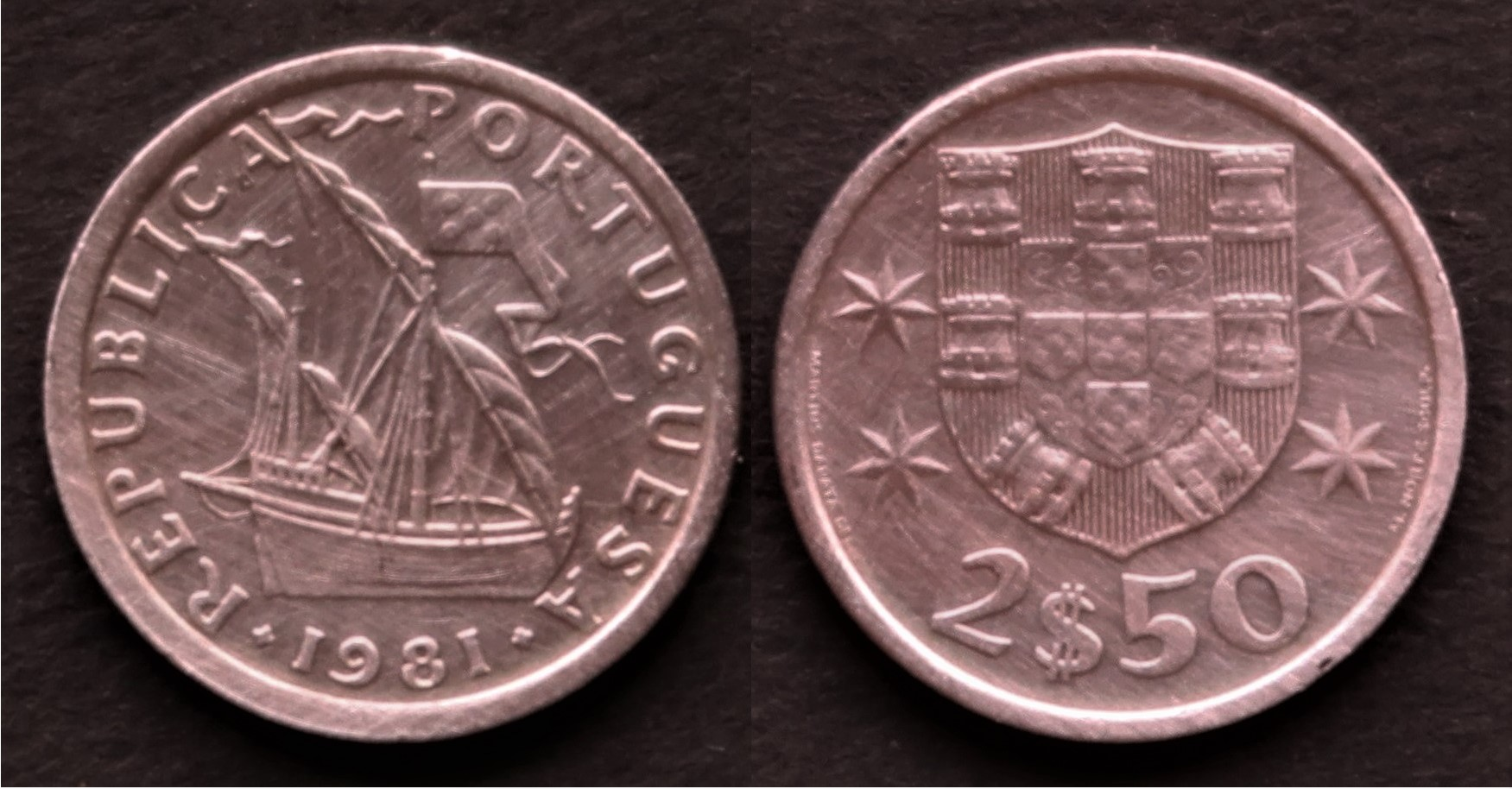
2.5 escudo coin

ISO 4217
- Code: PTE

Units of account
- Base unit: Escudo
- Plural: escudos
- Symbol: (⟨$⟩ is used when double-barred cifrão is not available)
- Superunit
- 1000: conto
- Subunit
- 1/100: centavo
- Plural
- centavo: centavos

Denominations
- Banknotes
- Freq. used: 500, 1,000, 2,000, 5,000, 10,000
- Rarely used: 20, 50, 100
- Coins
- Freq. used: 1, 5, 10, 20, 50, 100, 200
- Rarely used: 250, 25

Demographics
- User(s): None, previously: Portugal

Issuance
- Central bank: Banco de Portugal
- Website: www.bportugal.pt
- Mint: Imprensa Nacional-Casa da Moeda
- Website: www.incm.pt

Valuation
- Inflation: 2.8% (2000)
- Source: worldpress.org

EU Exchange Rate Mechanism (ERM)
- Since: 19 June 1989
- Fixed rate since: 31 December 1998
- Replaced by euro, non cash: 1 January 1999
- Replaced by euro, cash: 1 March 2002
- 1 € =: 200.482 PTE
- This infobox shows the latest status before this currency was rendered obsolete.

The Portuguese escudo (Portuguese: escudo português, pronounced [(i)ʃˈkudu puɾtuˈɣeʃ]) was the currency of Portugal replacing the real on 22 May 1911 and was in use until the introduction of the euro on 1 January 2002. The escudo was subdivided into 100 centavos. The word escudo literally means shield; like other coins with similar names, it depicts the coat of arms of the state.

Amounts in escudos were written as escudos centavos with the cifrão as the decimal separator (for example: 2500 means 25.00 escudos, 10050 means 100.50 escudos). Because of the conversion rate of 1,000 réis = 1, three decimal places were initially used (1 = 1000).

== History ==
The currency replaced by the escudo in 1911 was denominated in Portuguese reals (plural: réis) and milréis worth 1,000 réis. The milréis was equivalent to 2.0539 grams fine gold from 1688 to 1800, and 1.62585 g from 1854 to 1891. Gold escudos worth 1.6 milréis (or 1.600; not to be confused with the 20th-century currency) were issued from 1722 to 1800 in denominations of 1/2, 1, 2, 4 and 8 escudos.

The escudo (gold) was again introduced on 22 May 1911, after the 1910 Republican revolution, to replace the real at the rate of 1,000 réis to 1 escudo. The term mil réis (thousand réis) remained a colloquial synonym of escudo up to the 1990s. One million réis was called one conto de réis, or simply one conto. This expression passed on to the escudo, meaning one thousand escudos.

The escudo's value was initially set at 675 = 1 kg of gold. After 1914, the value of the escudo fell, being fixed in 1928 at 108.25 to £1 sterling. This was altered to 110 to £1 stg in 1931. A new rate of 27.50 escudos to the U.S. dollar was established in 1940, changing to 25 in 1940 and 28.75 in 1949.

During World War II, escudos were heavily sought after by Nazi Germany, through Swiss banks, as foreign currency to make purchases to Portugal and other neutral nations.

Inflation throughout the 20th century made centavos essentially worthless by its end, with fractional value coins with values such as 50 centavos and 2 1/2 eventually withdrawn from circulation in the 1990s. With the entry of Portugal in the Eurozone, the conversion rate to the euro was set at 200.482 = €1.

== Territorial usage ==
The escudo was used in the Portuguese mainland, the Azores and Madeira, with no distinction of coins or banknotes. In Portugal's African colonies, the escudo was generally used up to independence, in the form of Banco Nacional Ultramarino and Banco de Angola banknotes (rather than those of the Bank of Portugal used in Portugal proper), with Portuguese and in some cases local coins circulating alongside:

- Angolan escudo
- Cape Verdean escudo
- Mozambican escudo
- Portuguese Guinean escudo
- São Tomé and Príncipe escudo

Of the above, only Cape Verde continues to use the escudo.

In Macau, the currency during the colonial period was, as it is today, the Macanese pataca.

Timor-Leste adopted the Portuguese Timorese escudo whilst still a Portuguese colony, having earlier used the Portuguese Timor pataca.

Portuguese India adopted the Portuguese Indian escudo for a brief time between 1958 and 1961 before Goa became a part of India; prior to that, it used the Portuguese Indian rupia.

== Coins ==
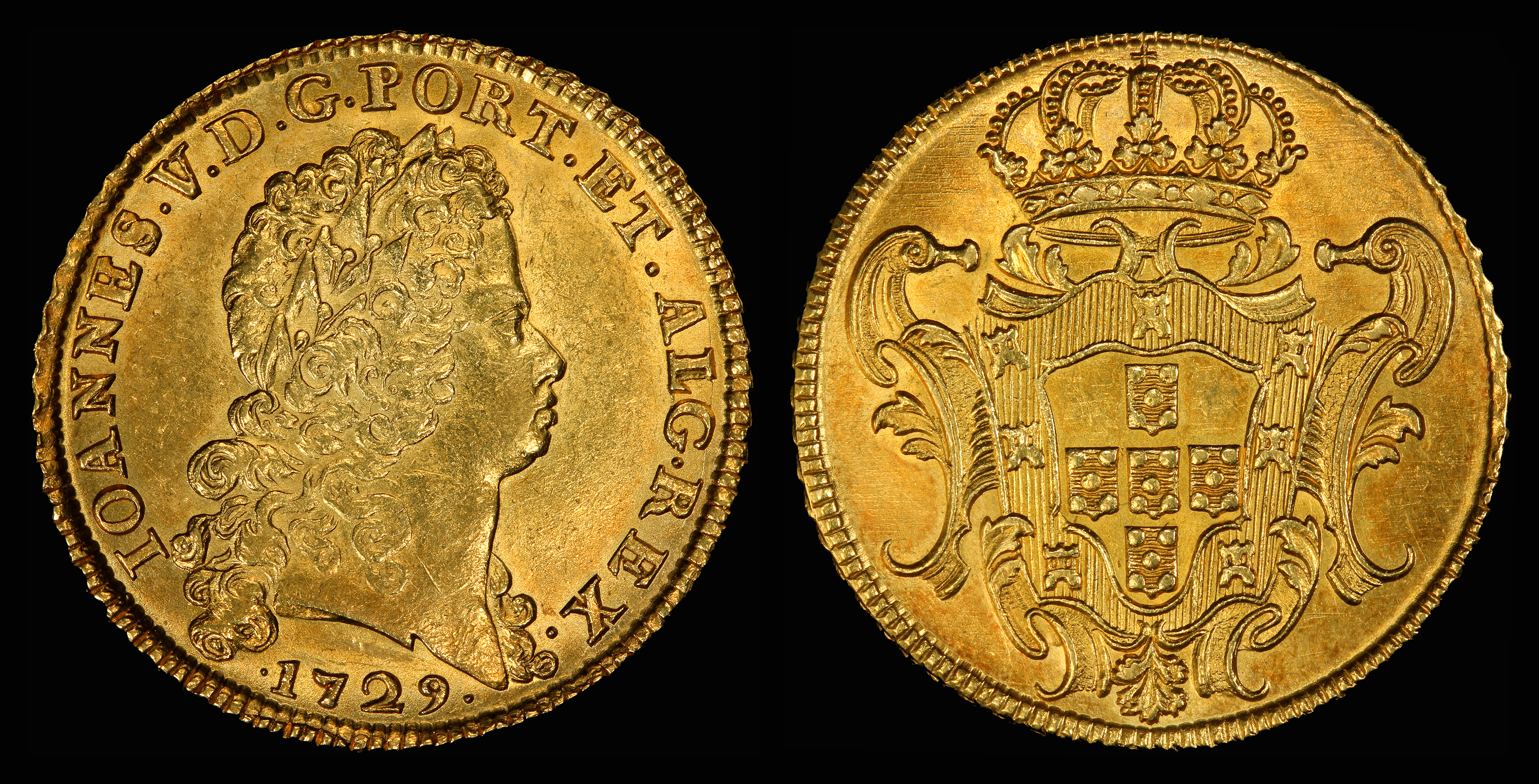
Portuguese 8 gold escudos (1729)

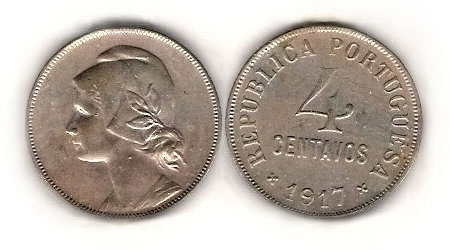
Portuguese 4 centavos, 1917

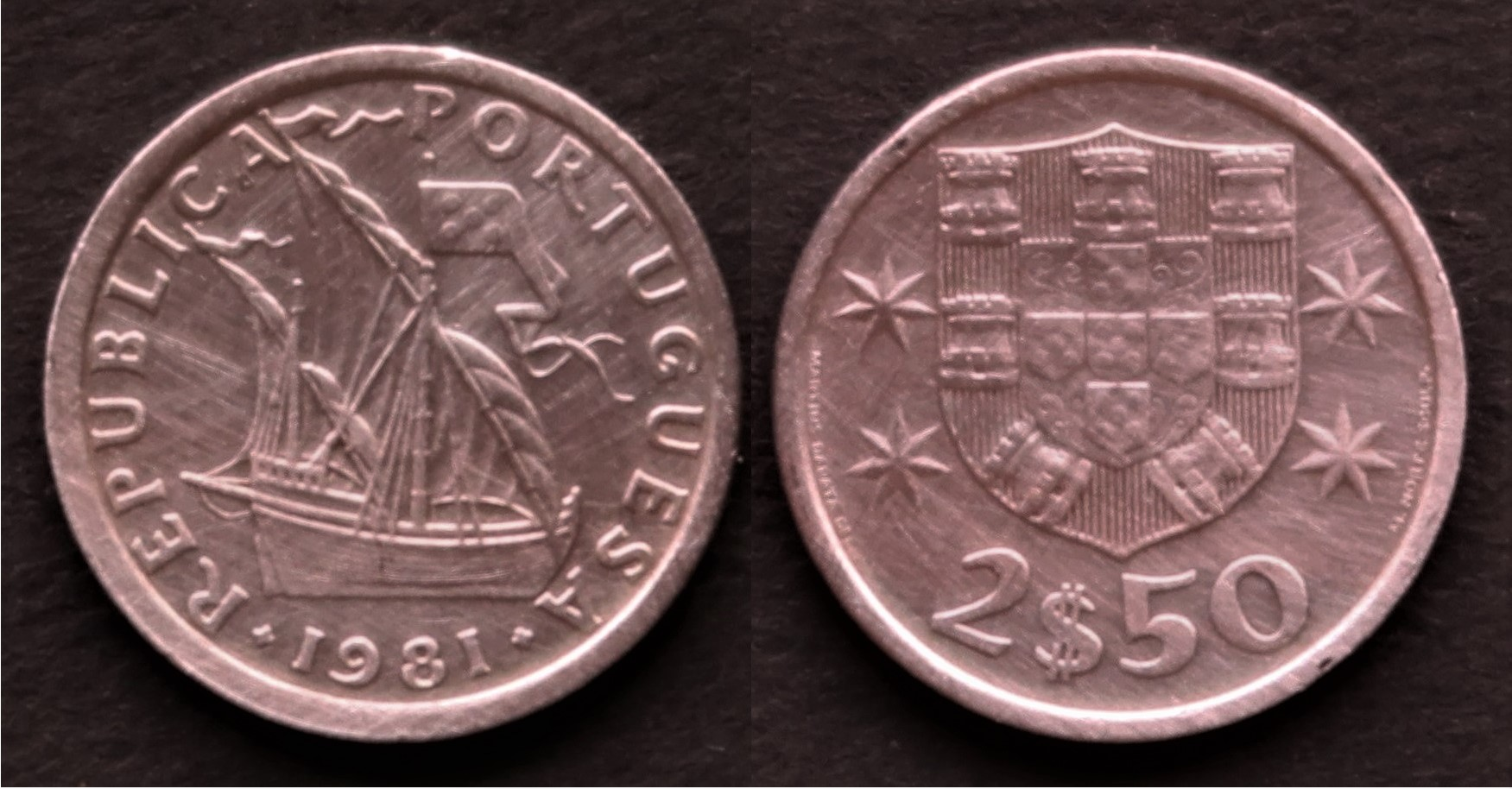
2.50 escudos, 1981

The mintage period for the various denominations of the gold escudo (worth 1.6 milréis or 1.600) introduced in 1722 was different: 1/2 escudo through 1821, 2 escudos through 1789, and 4 escudos through 1799. The eight-escudo coin was only struck between 1722 and 1730.

Between 1912 and 1916, silver 10, 20 and 50 centavos and 1 coins were issued. Bronze 1 and 2 centavos and cupro-nickel 4 centavo coins were issued between 1917 and 1922.

In 1920, bronze 5 centavos and cupro-nickel 10 and 20 centavo coins were introduced, followed, in 1924, by bronze 10 and 20 centavos and aluminium-bronze 50 centavos and 1 coins. Aluminium bronze was replaced with cupro-nickel in 1927.

In 1932, silver coins were introduced for 2 1/2, 5 and 10. The 2 1/2 and 5 were minted until 1951, with the 10 minted until 1955 with a reduced silver content. In 1963, cupro-nickel 2 1/2 and 5 were introduced, followed by aluminium 10, bronze 20 and 50 centavos and 1 in 1969. Cupro-nickel 10 and 25 were introduced in 1971 and 1977, respectively. In 1986, a new coinage was introduced which circulated until replacement by the euro. It consisted of nickel-brass 1, 5 and 10, cupro-nickel 20 and 50, with bimetallic 100 and 200 introduced in 1989 and 1991.

Coins in circulation at the time of the changeover to the euro were:

- 1 (0.50 cent)
- 5 (2.49 cents)
- 10 (4.99 cents)
- 20 (9.98 cents)
- 50 (24.94 cents)
- 100 (49.88 cents)
- 200 (99.76 cents)

Coins ceased to be exchangeable for euros on 31 December 2002.

Last series (1986–1991)
Image	Value	Technical parameters			Description			Issued from
Image	Value	Diameter (mm)	Mass (g)	Composition	Edge	Obverse	Reverse	Issued from
	1	16.00	1.70	Nickel-brass	Reeded	Coat of arms; knot; year of issue; lettering: Republica Portuguesa	Filigrees; value	1986–2001
	5	21.00	5.30	Nickel-brass	Reeded	Coat of arms; knot; year of issue; lettering: Republica Portuguesa	Filigrees; value	1986–2001
	10	23.50	7.40	Nickel-brass	Reeded	Coat of arms; knot; year of issue; lettering: Republica Portuguesa	Filigrees; value	1986–2001
	20	26.50	6.90	Cupronickel	Reeded	Coat of arms; value; year of issue; lettering: Republica Portuguesa	Nautical compass; Order of Christ cross	1986–2001
	50	31.00	9.40	Cupronickel	Reeded	Coat of arms; value; year of issue; lettering: Republica Portuguesa	Three-masted ship	1986–2001
	100	25.50	8.30	Outer: Cupronickel	Interrupted reeding	Coat of arms; value; year of issue; lettering: Republica Portuguesa	Pedro Nunes; stars; lettering: EUROPA	1989–2001
	100	25.50	8.30	Inner: Aluminium bronze	Interrupted reeding	Coat of arms; value; year of issue; lettering: Republica Portuguesa	Pedro Nunes; stars; lettering: EUROPA	1989–2001
	200	28.00	9.80	Outer: Aluminium bronze	Interrupted reeding	Coat of arms; value; year of issue; lettering: Republica Portuguesa	Garcia de Orta; waves; wheat ears	1991–2001
	200	28.00	9.80	Inner: Cupronickel	Interrupted reeding	Coat of arms; value; year of issue; lettering: Republica Portuguesa	Garcia de Orta; waves; wheat ears	1991–2001

Another name for the 50 centavos coin was coroa (crown). Long after the 50 centavos coins disappeared, people still called the 2 1/2 coins cinco coroas ("five crowns").

Also, people still referred to escudos at the time of the changeover in multiples of the older currency real (plural réis). Many people called the 2 1/2 coins dois e quinhentos (two and five-hundreds), referring to the correspondence 2 1/2 = 2500 réis. Tostão (plural tostões) is yet another multiple of real, with 1 tostão = 100 réis.

== Banknotes ==
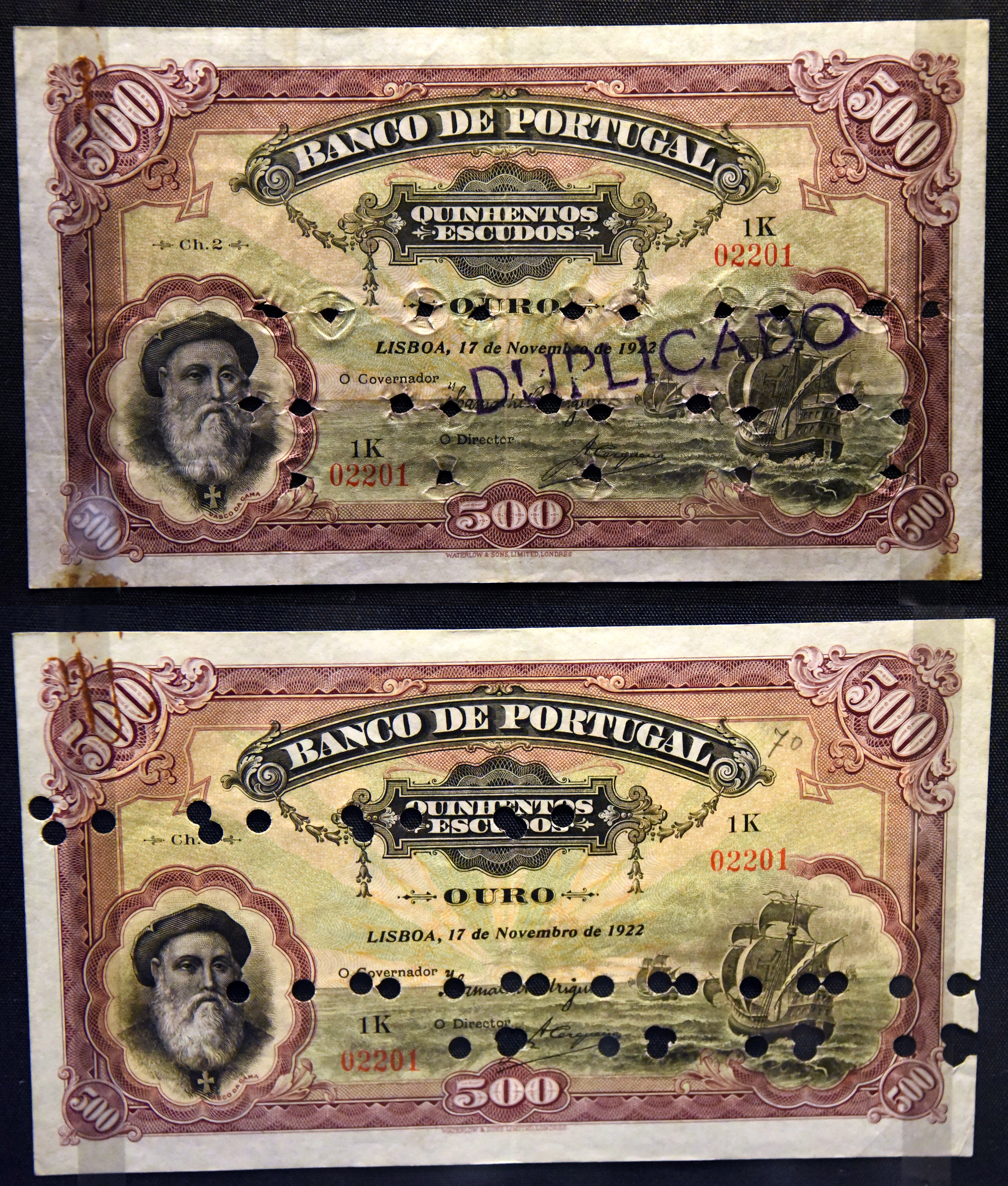
Counterfeit 500 note (upper) and a genuine banknote (lower) of Banco de Portugal. Both carry the same serial number of 1K 02201, 1922. On display at the British Museum in London

The Casa da Moeda issued notes for 5, 10, and 20 centavos between 1917 and 1925 whilst, between 1913 and 1922, the Banco de Portugal introduced notes for 50 centavos, 1, 2 1/2, 5, 10, 20, 50, 100, 500 and 1,000. 50 centavos and 1 notes ceased production in 1920, followed by 2 1/2, 5 and 10 in 1925 and 1926. 5,000 notes were introduced in 1942.

The last 20 and 50 notes were printed dated 1978 and 1980, respectively, with 100 notes being replaced by coins in 1989, the same year that the 10,000 note was introduced.

Banknotes in circulation at the time of the changeover to the euro were:

- 500 (€2.49)
- 1,000 (€4.99)
- 2,000 (€9.98)
- 5,000 (€24.94)
- 10,000 (€49.88)

The last series of escudo banknotes could be returned to the central bank Banco de Portugal and converted to euros until 28 February 2022.

Escudo banknotes celebrated notable figures from the history of Portugal. The final banknote series featured the Age of Discovery, with João de Barros, Pedro Álvares Cabral, Bartolomeu Dias, Vasco da Gama, and Henry the Navigator.

Portuguese Discoveries series (1995–2002) Designer: Luís Filipe de Abreu
Image	Value	Euro equivalent	Dimensions (mm)	Main colour	Description		Issued from	Lapse
Image	Value	Euro equivalent	Dimensions (mm)	Main colour	Obverse	Reverse	Issued from	Lapse
	500	€2.49	125 × 68	Red	João de Barros	Merchant and scholar; Códice Casanatense	1997, 2000	2022
	1000	€4.99	132 × 68	Purple	Pedro Álvares Cabral	Cabral's ship (Livro de Lisuarte de Abreu); Brazilian flora and fauna	1996, 1997, 2000	2022
	2000	€9.98	139 × 68	Blue	Bartolomeu Dias	Caravels; map by Henricus Martellus Germanus	1995, 1996, 1997, 2000	2022
	5000	€24.94	146 × 75	Green	Vasco da Gama	Sailing ship; tapestry of Chegada de Vasco da Gama	1995, 1996, 1997, 1998	2022
	10000	€49.88	153 × 75	Burgundy	Henry the Navigator	Caravel; cover of Crónica dos Feitos da Guiné	1996, 1997, 1998	2022
For table standards, see the banknote specification table.

== Colloquial expressions ==
Conto was the unofficial multiple of the escudo: 1 conto meant 1,000, 2 contos meant 2,000 and so on. The original expression was conto de réis, which means 'one count of réis' and referred to one million réis. Since the escudo was worth 1,000 réis (the older currency), therefore one conto was the same as a thousand escudos. The expression remained in usage after the advent of the euro, albeit less often, meaning €5, roughly worth 1,000.

Occasionally paus, literally meaning 'sticks', was also used to refer to the escudo ("Tens mil paus?" – 'Do you have 1,000 escudos/sticks?'). During the move from escudos to euros the Portuguese had a joke saying that they had lost three currencies: the escudo, the conto, and the pau.

== See also ==
- Portuguese euro coins
- Economy of Portugal
- Economic history of Portugal

== Notes ==
1. 1999 by law, 2002 de facto.

Preceded by Portuguese real	Portuguese currency 1911–1999/2002^{1}	Succeeded by Euro
