= Agnes Larson =

American historian (1892–1967)

Agnes Mathilda Larson
- Born: 15 March 1892; Preston, Minnesota
- Died: 24 January 1967 (aged 74)
- Education: St. Olaf College (B.A.); Columbia University (M.A.); Radcliffe College (M.A.); Radcliffe College(Ph.D)
- Occupation: Local historian

Agnes Larson (15 March 1892 – 24 January 1967) was an American local historian.

== Life and work ==
Agnes Matilda Larson was born in Preston, Minnesota on 15 March 1892, sister of Henrietta Larson. She attended St. Olaf College, graduating with a B.A. in history and English. Larson taught high school in Walcott, North Dakota and Northfield, Minnesota and studied social work at the University of Chicago in the summer. She was awarded her M.A. by Columbia University in 1922 and she taught at Mankato State Teachers College from 1922 to 1925. Larson started teaching at St. Olaf in 1926 and she received another M.A. from Radcliffe College in 1929. Two years later she was awarded a fellowship by the American Association of University Women and she studied the white pine industry in Minnesota with Frederick Merk at Harvard University. The following year, she returned to Northfield to work on her thesis and catalog for the Norwegian-American Historical Association. Larson received her doctorate from Radcliffe College in 1938. At that time the Radcliffe faculty were all Harvard Professors teaching under contract. Larson served as chair of the history department from 1942 to 1960, when she retired early due to health issues. Her dissertation, History of the White Pine Industry in Minnesota was published in 1949. Just before her death from cancer on 24 January 1967, she finished John A. Johnson: An Uncommon American, which appeared posthumously in 1969 In 1964 St. Olaf College named a dormitory for her.
