= Milréis =

The mil-réis (literally one thousand réis) was effectively a unit of currency in both Portugal (until 1911) and Brazil (until 1942).

As the value of the Portuguese real has historically been low (minted in copper since the 16th century), accounts have been kept in réis as well as milréis of 1,000 réis. The latter has been in use since the 1760s. In an edict of 24 April 1835 the main unit of account shifted from the real to the milréis.

It was replaced in 1911 by the escudo in Portugal and its colonies [one escudo (1$000) = one thousand réis] and in 1942 by the cruzeiro in Brazil. By the time it was replaced by the cruzeiro in Brazil, one mil-réis (1$000) was worth a dozen loaves of bread.
