= Portuguese Indian rupia =

Currency of Portuguese India until 1959

Denominations
- Subunit
- 10/100: tanga
- Banknotes: 5, 10, 20, 50, 100 and 500 rupia

Demographics
- Replaced by: escudo
- User(s): Portuguese India

Issuance
- Bank of issue: Banco Nacional Ultramarino
- This infobox shows the latest status before this currency was rendered obsolete.

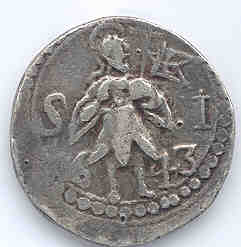
1643 silver tanga coin featuring a standing figure facing right with flag struck for and minted in Goa during the reign of John IV

The rupia was the currency of Portuguese India sometime after 1668 until 1958.

In decades that followed, the double xerafin came to be known in Goa and other Portuguese Indian territories simply as rupia (or Portuguese Indian rupia) was subdivided into units such as reis (real) and pardao that mirrored the currency terms introduced by Portuguese officials in other colonies worldwide.

== History ==
Prior to 1668, the currency unit was Xerafim (xerafin, xeraphin). In 1666, the Portuguese administration struck a silver coin calling it double xerafin and this was declared equal to a rupia in circulation in India outside of Portuguese possessions. A xerafim was a convertible subunit of rupia, and it was unique to Portuguese colonies in India. One rupia equalled two xerafims.

Before 1871, the rupia was subdivided into 750 bazarucos, 600 réis (singular: real), 20 pardaus or 10 tangas. A rupia equaled two xerafims. After 1871, 960 réis or 16 tangas (worth 60 réis) equalled 1 rupia. The rupia was equal in value to the Indian rupee. This meant the tanga was equal in value to the Indian anna. In 1959, the currency was replaced by the escudo at the rate of 1 rupia = 6 escudos.

== Coins ==
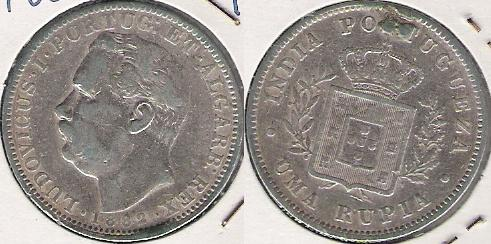
Coin of Portuguese India, one rupia of 1882.

Goa, Damão and Diu issued their own coinages until the middle of the 19th century. Damão issued copper 3, 15, 30 and 60 réis coins until 1854 when the mint closed. Diu issued lead and tin 5 and 10 bazarucos together with tin 20 bazarucos, copper 30 and 60 réis and silver 150 and 300 réis and 1 rupia. The Diu mint closed in 1859.

Goa issued the most diverse coinage of the three mints. In addition to tin bastardo, there were copper coins in denominations of 3, 4 1/2, 6, 7 1/2, 9, 10, 12 and 15 réis, 1/2 and 1 tanga, silver coins for 1/2 and 1 tanga, 1/2 and 1 pardau, and 1 rupia, and gold 1, 2, 4, 8 and 12 xerafins. The Goa mint was closed by the British in 1869.

Following the closure of the last local mint, coins were imported from Portugal beginning in 1871. This new coinage coincided with the reform of the subdivisions of the rupia. Copper coins were introduced in denominations of 3, 5, 10 and 15 réis, 1/2 and 1 tanga. In 1881, copper 1/8 tanga and silver 1/8, 1/4, 1/2 and 1 rupia coins were introduced. Bronze replaced copper in 1901, whilst cupro-nickel 2 and 4 tangas were introduced in 1934, followed by 1/2 and 1 rupia in 1947 and 1952, respectively.

== Banknotes ==
Portuguese 1 Rupia, 1924

The first paper money issued specifically for Portuguese India was issued by the Junta da Fazenda Pública in 1882 in denominations of 10 and 20 rupias. These were followed in 1883 by notes issued by the General Government (Governo Geral) for 5, 10, 20, 50, 100 and 500 rupias.

In 1906, the Banco Nacional Ultramarino took over the issuance of paper money, issuing notes for 5, 10, 20 and 50 rupias. In 1917, notes were added for 4 and 8 tangas, 1 and 2 1/2 rupias. These were the only issue of tanga denominated notes, whilst the 2 1/2 rupia notes were issued until 1924 and the 1 rupia until 1929. 100 and 500 rupias notes were reintroduced in 1924.
