= Portuguese Timorese escudo =

Currency of Portuguese Timor between 1959 and 1976

escudo timorense (Portuguese); 厄斯科多 (Chinese)
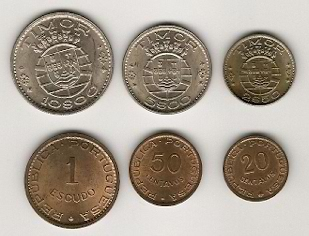
- Last mintage (1970)

ISO 4217
- Code: TPE; Obsolete per ISO 4217: 2002-11

Units of account
- Subunit
- 1/100: centavo

Denominations
- Banknotes: 20, 50, 100, 500 and 1000 escudos
- Coins: 10, 20, 50 centavos, 1, 2 1/2, 5 and 10 escudos

Demographics
- User(s): Portuguese Timor

Issuance
- Central bank: Banco Nacional Ultramarino
- This infobox shows the latest status before this currency was rendered obsolete.

The escudo was the currency of Portuguese Timor between 1959 and 1976. It replaced the pataca at a rate of 5.6 escudos = 1 pataca and was equivalent to the Portuguese escudo. It was replaced by the Indonesian rupiah at an unknown exchange rate following East Timor's occupation by Indonesia. The escudo was subdivided into 100 centavos.

East Timor (formerly Portuguese Timor) now uses the United States dollar banknotes and has its own coins in circulation.

== Coins ==
The first coins issued, dated 1958, were in denominations of 10, 30 and 60 centavos, 1, 3 and 6 escudos. The unusual denominations (see also the banknotes, below) may have been due to the exchange rate from the previous currency. The 10 and 30 centavos were struck in bronze, the 60 centavos and 1 escudo in cupro-nickel, and the 3 and 6 escudos in silver. In 1964, a silver 10 escudos was introduced, followed, in 1970, by more conventional denominations of 20 and 50 centavos, 1, 2 1/2, 5 and 10 escudos. The 20 and 50 centavos and 1 escudo were struck in bronze, with the higher denominations struck in cupro-nickel.

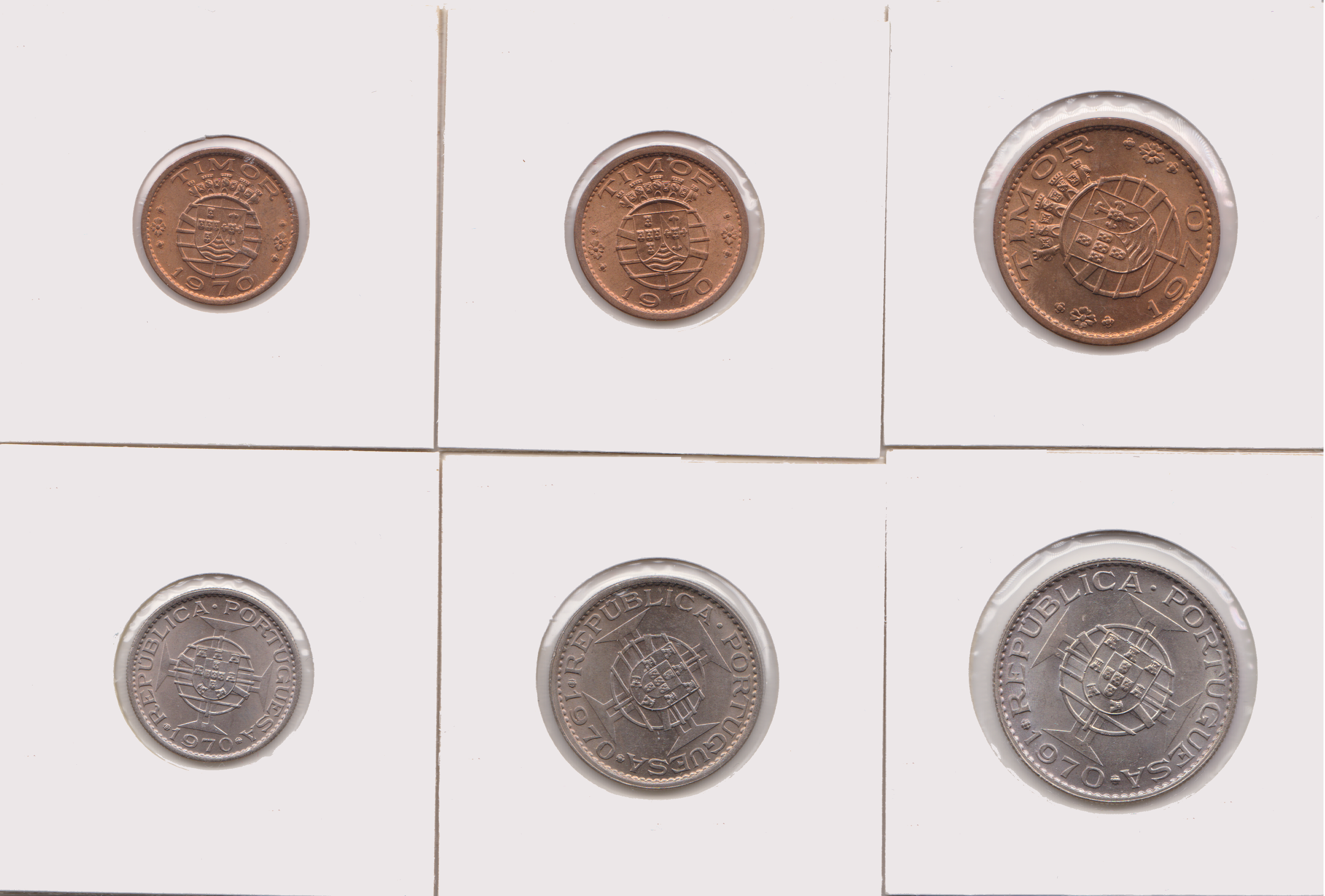
1970 Portuguese Timor escudos.

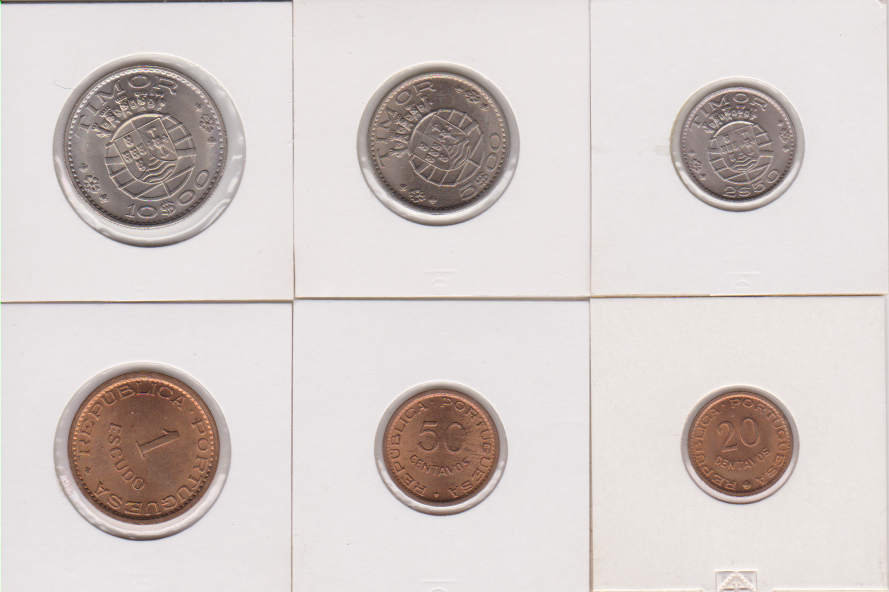
1970 Portuguese Timor escudos reverse.

== Banknotes ==
The first banknotes, dated 1959, were in denominations of 30, 60, 100 and 500 escudos. In 1967, 20 and 50 escudos notes were introduced, followed by 1000 escudos in 1968. All paper money was issued by the Banco Nacional Ultramarino.

== See also ==
- Cifrão
