= Henrietta Larson =

American business historian (1894–1983)

Henrietta Melia Larson
- Born: 24 September 1894; Ostrander, Minnesota
- Died: 24 August 1983 (aged 88)
- Education: St. Olaf College (B.A.); Columbia University (Ph.D.)
- Occupation: Historian

Henrietta Melia Larson (24 September 1894 – 25 August 1983) was an American business historian.

== Life and work ==
Henrietta Melia Larson was born in Ostrander, Minnesota on 24 September 1894 to Hans Olaf Larson (1858–1937) and Maria Karen Nordgarden (1858–1942). Her sister was Agnes Larson. She received her B.A. from St. Olaf College in 1918 and taught one year of high school before she became an instructor at Augustana College in 1921–22. She studied at the University of Minnesota in 1922–24, then taught at Bethany College from 1925 to 1926. Larson received her Ph.D. from Columbia University and The Wheat Market and the Farmer in Minnesota, 1858–1900 in 1926. She then taught at Southern Illinois University in 1926–28 before she became a research associate at the Harvard University Graduate School of Business Administration in 1928. Together with N. S. B. Gras, she wrote Jay Cooke, Private Banker in 1936 and she was the editor of the Bulletin of the Business Historical Society in 1938. They compiled the Casebook in American Business History in 1939 and Larson was promoted to assistant professor that same year. She became the first woman to be appointed associate professor in the Graduate School of Business in 1942. Six years later, she wrote the Guide to Business History with Kenneth Wiggins Porter and she became associate editor of the Harvard Studies in Business History and then editor two years later. Larson was the senior author of the History of Humble Oil and Refining Company and History of Standard Oil Company (New Jersey), Vol. 3: New Horizons, 1927–1950, together with Evelyn H. Knowlton and Charles S. Popple. She was appointed professor of business history in 1960 and retired the following year. Larson died on 25 August 1983.

== Works ==
- The Wheat Market and the Farmer in Minnesota, 1858-1900, Henrietta Larson (1926)
- Jay Cooke, Private Banker, Henrietta Larson (1936)
- Guide to Business History: Materials for the Study of American Business History and Suggestions for Their Use, Henrietta Larson (1948)
- History of Humble Oil & Refining Company, A Study in Industrial Growth, Henrietta M. Larson and Kevin Wiggins Porter (1959)

== Archives and records ==
- Henrietta Larson papers at Baker Library Special Collections, Harvard Business School.
