= James Alton James =

American historian (1864–1962)

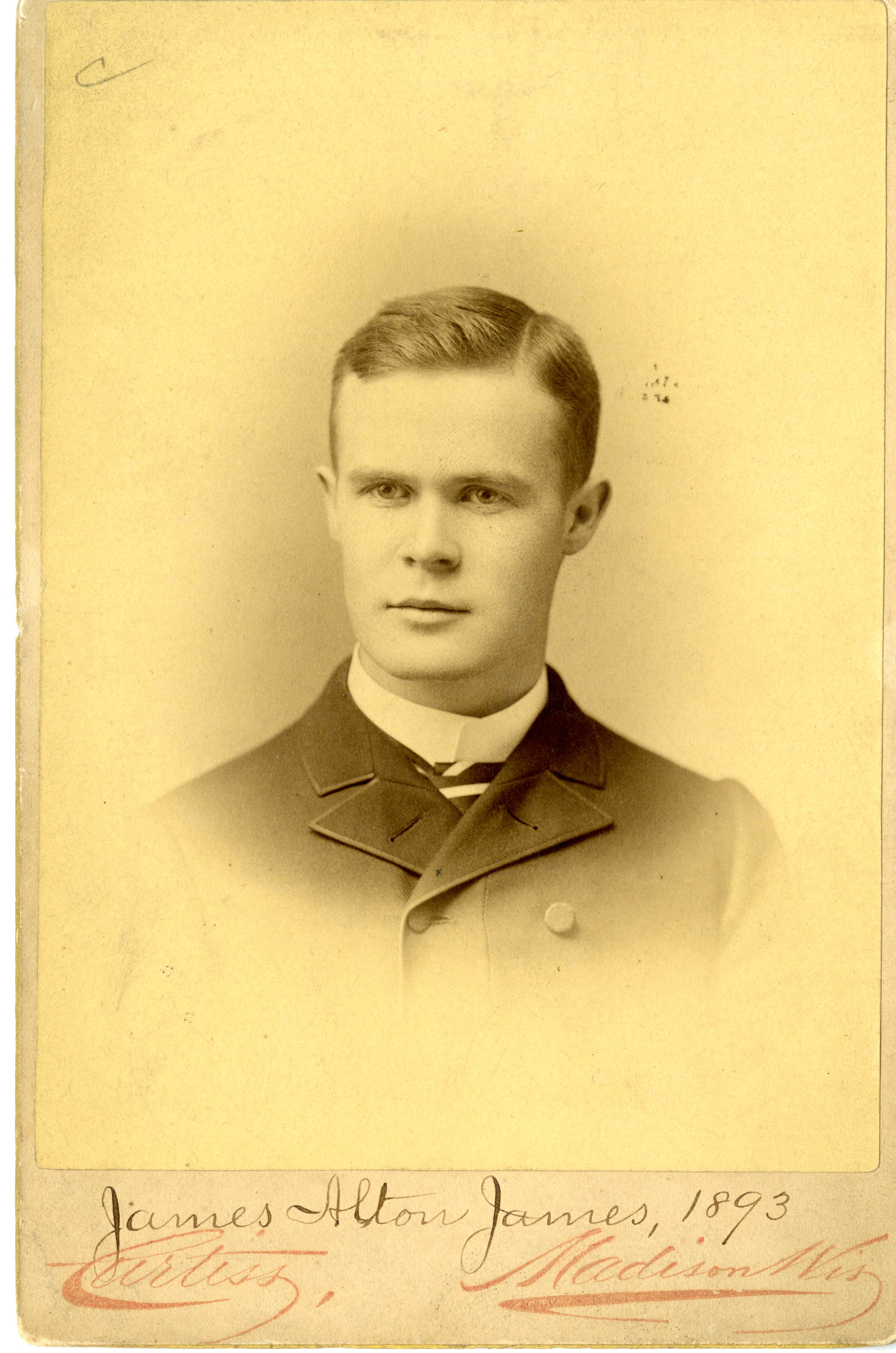
In 1893

James Alton James (17 September 1864 – 12 February 1962) was an American educator and historian.

== Early life and education ==
James was born on 17 September 1864, in Jefferson, Wisconsin. He spent two years at the Platteville Normal School, and then, after teaching high school for two years to pay for the university, entered the University of Wisconsin, where he graduated as valedictorian with an LL.B. in 1888. He received a Ph.D. from Johns Hopkins University in 1893.

== Career ==
He was superintendent of schools in Darlington, Wisconsin, 1888–1890; professor of history at Cornell College, Iowa, 1893–97. He became a professor of history at Northwestern University in 1897, becoming professor emeritus in 1935. He was head of the history department for over two decades and was also the chairman of the graduate student work at the university from 1917–1931. He was a member of several educational and historical societies. James died on 12 February 1962, in Evanston, Illinois.

== Works ==
- Government in State and Nation, with Allen Hart Stanford (1901)
- Our Government (1903)
- American History (1909)
- Readings in American History (1914)
- Charles Seignobos, History of Contemporary Civilization, editor (1909)
- George Rogers Clark Papers, editor (Illinois State Historical Society, 1912)
- Oliver Pollock, The Life and Times of an Unknown Patriot (1937)

== Sources ==
- Rines, George Edwin, ed. (1920). "James, James Alton" . Encyclopedia Americana.
- "Guide to the James Alton James (1846-1962) Papers". Northwestern University Library.
