= Portuguese Indian escudo =

Currency of Portuguese India between 1959 and 1961

Escudo da Índia
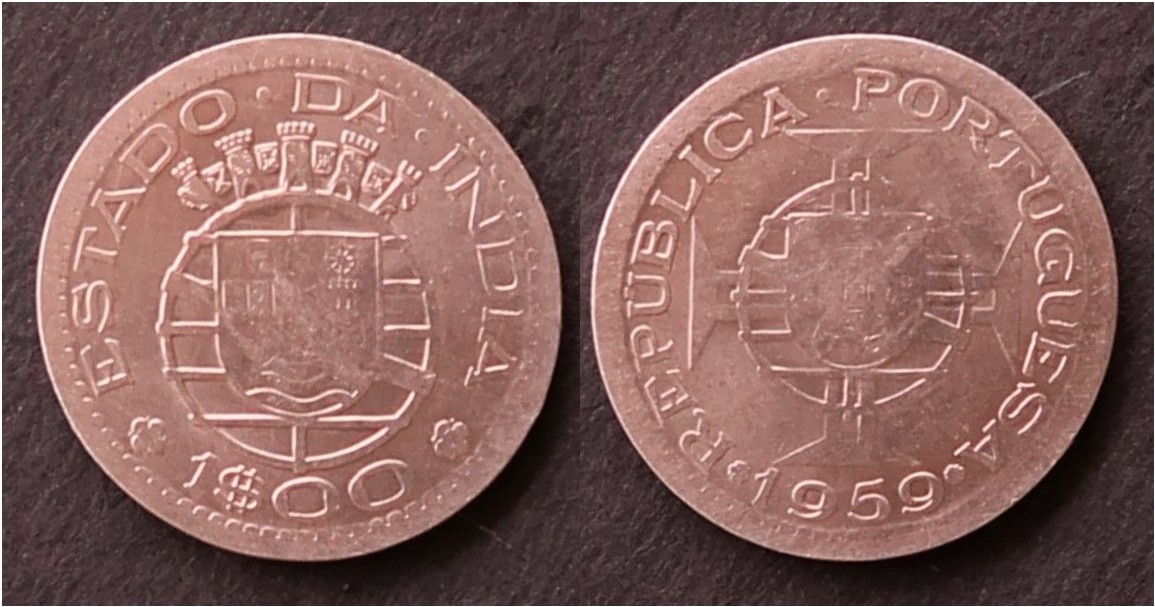
- 1 Escudo (1959)

Denominations
- Subunit
- 1/100: centavo
- Banknotes: 30, 60, 100, 300, 600, 1000 escudos
- Coins: 10, 30, 60 centavos, 1, 3, 6 escudos

Demographics
- User(s): Portuguese India

Issuance
- Bank of issue: Banco Nacional Ultramarino

Valuation
- Pegged with: Portuguese escudo
- This infobox shows the latest status before this currency was rendered obsolete.

The escudo was the currency of Portuguese India between 1959 and 1961. It was subdivided into 100 centavos and was equal in value to the Portuguese escudo.

== History ==
The escudo was introduced for accounting purposes on 1 January 1959. Coins and banknotes were introduced in the latter half of 1959. The escudo replaced the rupia at the rate of 1 rupia = 6 escudos. This was due to the respective values of the Indian rupee (to which the rupia was pegged) and the Portuguese escudo, with one rupee equalling one shilling six pence (18 pence) sterling and one escudo equaling three pence.

After Portuguese India was integrated by the Republic of India in 1961, the Indian rupee became legal tender together with the escudo on 29 December 1961. The escudo was then withdrawn from circulation effective 15 May 1962.

== Coins ==
Coins were introduced in November 1959 in denominations of 10, 30 and 60 centavos, 1, 3 and 6 escudos. The 10 and 30 centavos were struck in bronze, the others in cupro-nickel. Except for the 10 centavos, which was minted in 1961, none of these coins were produced after 1959.

== Banknotes ==
In 1959, notes were introduced by the Banco Nacional Ultramarino in denominations of 30, 60, 100, 300, 600 and 1000 escudos.

Image		Value	Main colour	Description	
Obverse	Reverse	Value	Main colour	Obverse	Reverse
		30 escudos	Red	Afonso de Albuquerque	Afonso de Albuquerque and ships
		60 escudos	Violet	Afonso de Albuquerque	Afonso de Albuquerque and ships
		100 escudos	Blue	Afonso de Albuquerque	Afonso de Albuquerque and ships
		300 escudos	Red	Afonso de Albuquerque	Afonso de Albuquerque and ships
		600 escudos	Green	Afonso de Albuquerque	Afonso de Albuquerque and ships
		1000 escudos	Brown-green	Afonso de Albuquerque	Afonso de Albuquerque and ships
