= Eurobank =

Eurobanks are financial institutions that accept deposits and make loans in foreign currencies.

- Eurobank Ergasias, in Greece
- EuroBancshares, in Puerto Rico
- Euro Bank, in Poland
- Banque Commerciale pour l'Europe du Nord – Eurobank, in France, Russian-owned
- Bulgarian Postbank, legally known as Eurobank Bulgaria AD
