= Mozambican escudo =

Currency of Mozambique between 1914 and 1980

- 500 Escudos

ISO 4217
- Code: MZE before 2006: MZM

Unit
- Symbol: ?

Denominations
- Subunit
- 1/100: Centavo
- Banknotes: 50, 100, 500, 1000 escudos
- Coins: 10, 20, 50 centavos, 1, 2 1/2, 5, 10, 20 escudos

Demographics
- User(s): Mozambique

Issuance
- Central bank: Banco Nacional Ultramarino

Valuation
- Inflation: ?%
- This infobox shows the latest status before this currency was rendered obsolete.

The escudo was the currency of Mozambique from 1914 until 1980. It was subdivided into 100 centavos.

== History ==
The escudo replaced the real at a rate of 1 escudo = 1000 réis. It was equal in value to the Portuguese escudo until 1977. Initially, Mozambique had its own paper money but used Portuguese coins. Only in 1935 were coins issued specifically for use in Mozambique. In 1975, the metica was proposed as a replacement for the escudo, but it was not used. The escudo was replaced by the metical in 1980 at par.

== Coins ==
Between 1935 and 1936, coins for 10, 20 and 50 centavos, 1, 2 1/2, 5 and 10 escudos, with the 2 1/2, 5 and 10 escudos in silver. In 1952, silver 20 escudos were issued. Between 1968 and 1971, base metal coins replaced the silver 5, 10 and 20 escudos. The last coins were issued in 1974.

== Banknotes ==
In 1914, provisional issues for 100 and 1000 escudos were introduced, alongside regular issues for 10, 20 and 50 centavos, by the Banco Nacional Ultramarino. Emergency issues of notes for 10, 20 and 50 centavos and 1 and 2 1/2 escudos were introduced in 1920, followed by regular issues for 1, 2 1/2, 5, 10, 20, 50 and 100 escudos. Emergency issues for 50 centavos and regular 500 and 1000 escudos notes were introduced in 1941. In 1976, 50, 100, 500 and 1000 escudos notes of the Banco Nacional Ultramarino were overprinted with the name of the new issuing bank, the Banco de Moçambique.

Preceded by: Mozambican real Ratio: 1 escudo = 1000 réis	Currency of Mozambique; 1914 – 1980	Succeeded by: Mozambican metical Ratio: at par
