= Mozambican metica =

The metica (plural meticas) was a proposed currency for Mozambique. It was divided into 100 centimos. Coins were produced dated 1975 and banknotes dated 1976. However, these were not put into circulation and the escudo continued to circulate until 1980, when the metical was introduced.
