= Jorge Jardim Gonçalves =

Portuguese banker (born 1935)

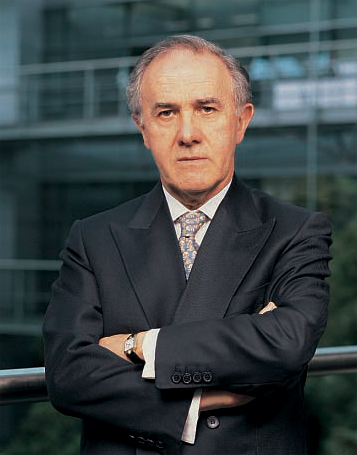
- Born: Jorge Manuel Jardim Gonçalves; 4 October 1935 (age 91); Funchal, Madeira, Portugal
- Occupation: Banker
- Spouse: Maria d'Assunção Almeida Osório de Vasconcelos

Jorge Manuel Jardim Gonçalves MTCG GCIH ComNSC (Funchal, Santa Maria Maior, 4 October 1935) is a Portuguese banker.

== Life ==
Jorge Manuel Jardim Gonçalves was born on 4 October 1935 son of Agostinho Carlos Gonçalves (1900–1990), businessman, and of his wife Maria Bernardete Estêvão de Sousa Jardim (1899–1989), a teacher. Jardim Gonçalves was born and raised in Madeira until settling in continental Portugal to study and eventually pursue a business career.

At University of Coimbra he read Civil Engineering. In the late 1950s he moved to Porto where we got his degree in Civil Engineering, from the University of Porto in 1961.

Jardim Gonçalves moved back to Madeira to intern in the work of enlargement of the Funchal Airport, but in 1962 he was conscripted to join the army being subsequently sent to Angola where he fought in the Operação Viriato.

In 1962 he married Maria da Assunção Almeida Osório de Vasconcelos, with whom he has 5 children.

In 1969 he went back to the University of Porto that hired him as a professor of Hydraulics. He also became an Engineer at the Administration of the shipyards of the Douro. However, in 1970 he decided to change his career path and began to pursue a career in banking moving to Lisbon. As soon as 1974, Jardim Gonçalves was already a member of the board of a small Portuguese bank, Banco da Agricultura.

After the Carnation Revolution, Jardim Gonçalves was forced to move into exile, settling in Madrid, becoming a director at the Banco Popular Español, from 1975 to 1976. During that time of his life, he adhered to the Opus Dei, a Catholic institution founded by Josemaría Escrivá, to which he famously still belongs as of today.

As a member of the Opus Dei he has developed various activities with the organization.

After coming back to Portugal in 1977, after being invited to join the board of the Banco Português do Atlântico by the then Minister of Finances, Henrique Medina Carreira. In 1979 he is elected President of the Board of the Banco Português do Atlântico and of the Commercial Bank of Macau.

=== Banco Comercial Português ===
In the 1980s he got involved in the creation of a new banking institution. This project, initially meant to be called Banco Comercial do Norte was led by Américo Amorim, António Gonçalves e Macedo Silva and it eventually became known as Banco Comercial Português, officially created in 1985. Jardim Gonçalves was made President of the bank since its creation, subsequently gaining control of the Banco Português do Atlântico, in 1995, of the Bank Mello, of the Insurance Company Império and of the Bank Pinto & Sotto Mayor, in 2000. Jardim Gonçalves became, during the late 1990s regarded as one of the most influential and powerful businessmen in Portugal.

Jardim Gonçalves left the Presidency of the Board at the Banco Comercial Português in March 2005 being succeeded in his position by jurist Paulo Teixeira Pinto. In 2008 Jardim Gonçalves was forced to leave the bank altogether after a high-profile controversial conflict between shareholders that also led to the departure of Teixeira Pinto.

== Controversy ==
In 2010 he was fined in one million euros by the Banco de Portugal, after revelation of nine financial infractions on his part.

=== Retirement pension ===
Another controversy about Jardim Gonçalves was the publicizing of his retirement pension that the Banco Comercial Português bought for him from an insurance company to compensate him after his departure from the bank, since the bank's board members do not have the same privilege. The pension got national media attention because of its extravagance consisting of a monthly allowance of 174 857.83 euros and the right to the use of 4 bodyguards and two cars for their transportation as well as use of a private jet and 5 luxury cars with 2 paid-for drivers

== Issue ==
In 1962 Jorge Jardim Gonçalves married Maria d'Assunção Almeida Osório de Vasconcelos (Porto, 17 April 1934) daughter of Fernando Osório de Vasconcelos (1911–1997) and his wife Albertina Augusta de Almeida (1906–1966), with whom he has two daughters and three sons:

- Maria Luísa Osório de Vasconcelos Jardim Gonçalves
- Jorge Alberto Osório de Vasconcelos Jardim Gonçalves
- Maria Sofia Osório de Vasconcelos Jardim Gonçalves (Luanda, 13 August 1964), married to João Afonso Calainho de Azevedo Teixeira Duarte (Lisbon, 14 May 1963), of whom she has 14 children.
- Filipe Manuel Osório de Vasconcelos Jardim Gonçalves
- Rodrigo José Osório de Vasconcelos Jardim Gonçalves married to Joana Mantero Bilbao do Nascimento with whom he has 2 children.
