= Millennium bim =

Mozambican bank

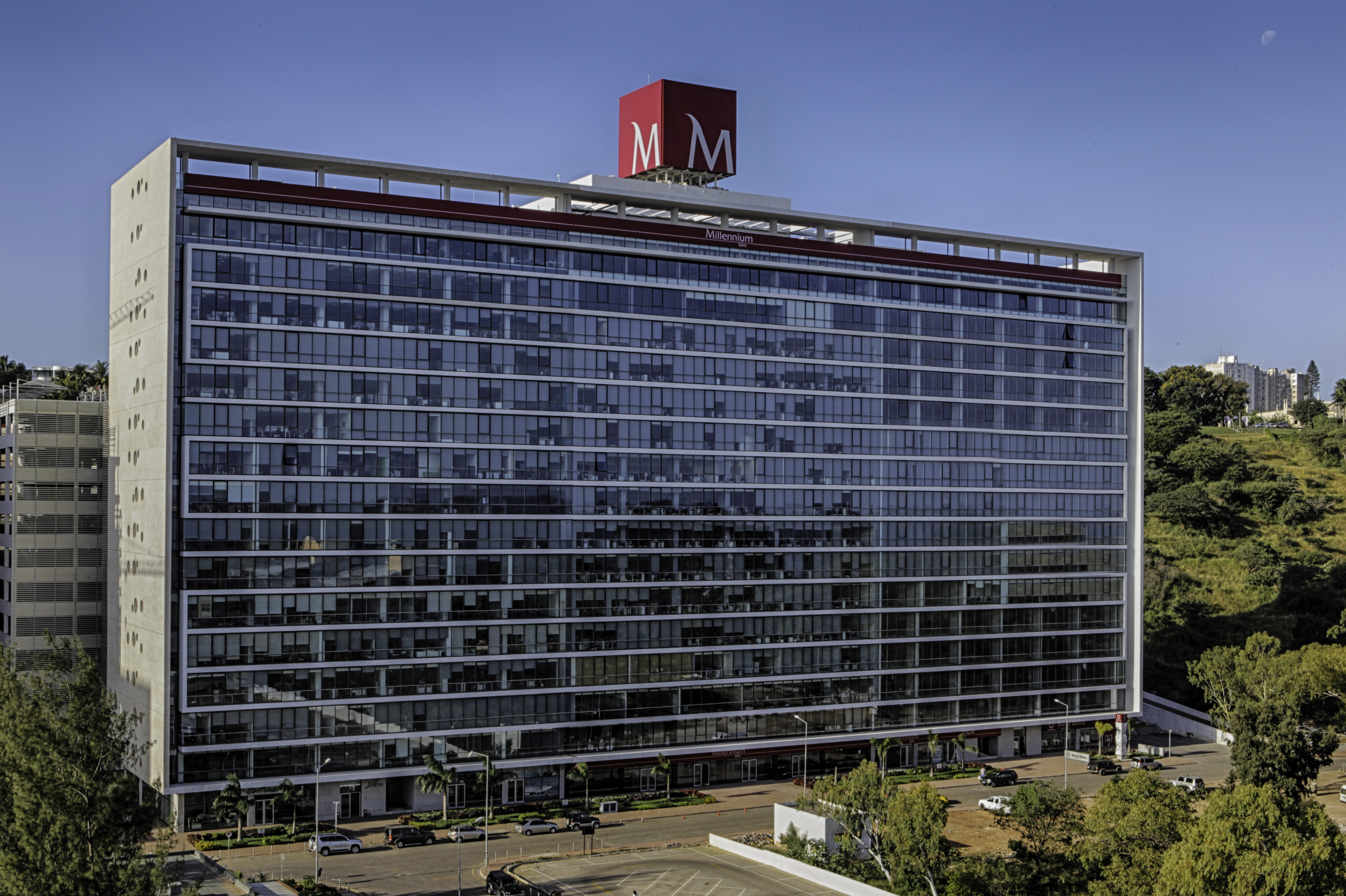
- Type: Public company
- Industry: Financial services
- Founded: Maputo, Mozambique 1995; 31 years ago
- Headquarters: Maputo, Mozambique, Mozambique
- Key people: José Reino da Costa, CEO
- Revenue: ▲$150,504 million (2021)
- Total assets: ▲$ 272,170 million (2021)
- Number of employees: 2,496
- Website: millenniumbim.co.mz

Millennium bim is a Mozambican bank that was founded on 25 October 1995, the result of a strategic partnership between Banco Comercial Português, now known as Millennium bcp, and the Mozambican state. It is currently one of the largest banks in Mozambique.

== History ==
In 2000, and in the process of changes to the levels of the structures surrounding shareholders in the Banco Comercial de Moçambique (BCM), the principal shareholder of Banco Internacional de Moçambique, the Banco Comercial Português would go on to become the shareholder of reference of the BCM and the Banco Internacional de Moçambique. This evolution determined the necessity that would proceed the merging of the two entities, which concluded in 2001. With this operation, the new structure of the bank maintained the designation of one of the banks of the Banco Internacional de Moçambique.

In 2006, the Banco Comercial Português rebranded as Millennium in every region where it was present.^{[1]} In alignment with this, Banco Internacional de Moçambique began to do business as Millennium bim as a commercial brand.

Important milestones include:

- 2011: Hits more than 1,000,000 customers.
- 2014: Central banking services change headquarters, moving to the Jat complex on Rua dos Desportistas in Maputo.
- 2015: The bank celebrates 20 years of existence.
- 2016: Hits 1,500,000 customers.
- 2018: Hits 1,800,000 customers.
- 2020: Bank celebrates 25 years of existence.

Present throughout Mozambique, and with one of the largest number of locations in the country, Millennium bim has also been a pioneer in the introduction of ATMs, point of sale transactions, and debit and credit cards in the country. With around 2,500 employees in 2018, the bank is the largest financial institution in the country, and the largest fiscal contributor to the Mozambican financial system, with a continued and sustained rate of growth.

In November 2017, the bank was awarded with the Mozambican Bank of the Year award in London, United Kingdom, by The Banker. It was the 11th time that the bank was awarded this by the publication.

== See also ==
- Bank of Mozambique
