= Euro Bank =

Bank in Poland

- Company type: Spółka Akcyjna
- Founded: 2003
- Defunct: 2019
- Headquarters: ul. św. Mikołaja 72, 50-126, Wrocław, Poland
- Key people: Alexis Lacroix
- Products: Financial services
- Parent: Bank Millennium
- Website: eurobank.pl

Euro Bank SA (also known as Eurobank) was a Polish commercial bank offering financial services to individuals. The bank also maintained personal accounts and term deposits, provided consolidation loans, payment cards, and credit cards. It distributed investment funds of Novo Fundusze and Allianz.

Euro Bank had a nationwide network of its own and franchise branches. It also operated outlets in shopping centers.

On 1 October 2019 as a result of the legal merger, the legal successor of Euro Bank SA became Bank Millennium SA.

== History ==
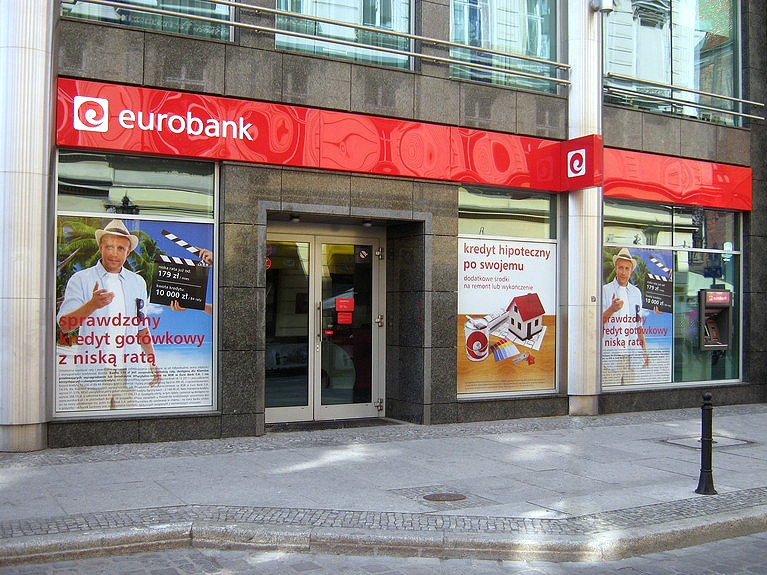
Euro Bank in Wrocław

The Bank was established in 2003 by taking over Look Finansowanie Inwestycji, controlled by Mariusz Łukasiewicz, a controlling stake existing since 1990 from Bank Społem S.A. In 2003, Bank Społem S.A. changed its name to Euro Bank S.A.

After the founder's death in 2004, the Société Générale group became the owner of Eurobank.

On November 5, 2018, Bank Millennium and Société Générale signed a contract for the purchase of Euro Bank by Bank Millennium. The subject of the transaction is the acquisition by Bank Millennium of approximately 99.79% of shares in Euro Bank for a reference price of PLN 1,833 million. The strategical investor of the bank is Banco Comercial Português (BCP).

Eurobank ran numerous advertising campaigns in which appeared, among others, Krystyna Janda, Danuta Stenka, Janusz Gajos, Tomasz Kot Katarzyna Figura and Piotr Adamczyk.

== See also ==
- List of banks in Poland
