= Banco Português do Atlântico =

Portuguese bank

Banco Português do Atlântico, S.A.

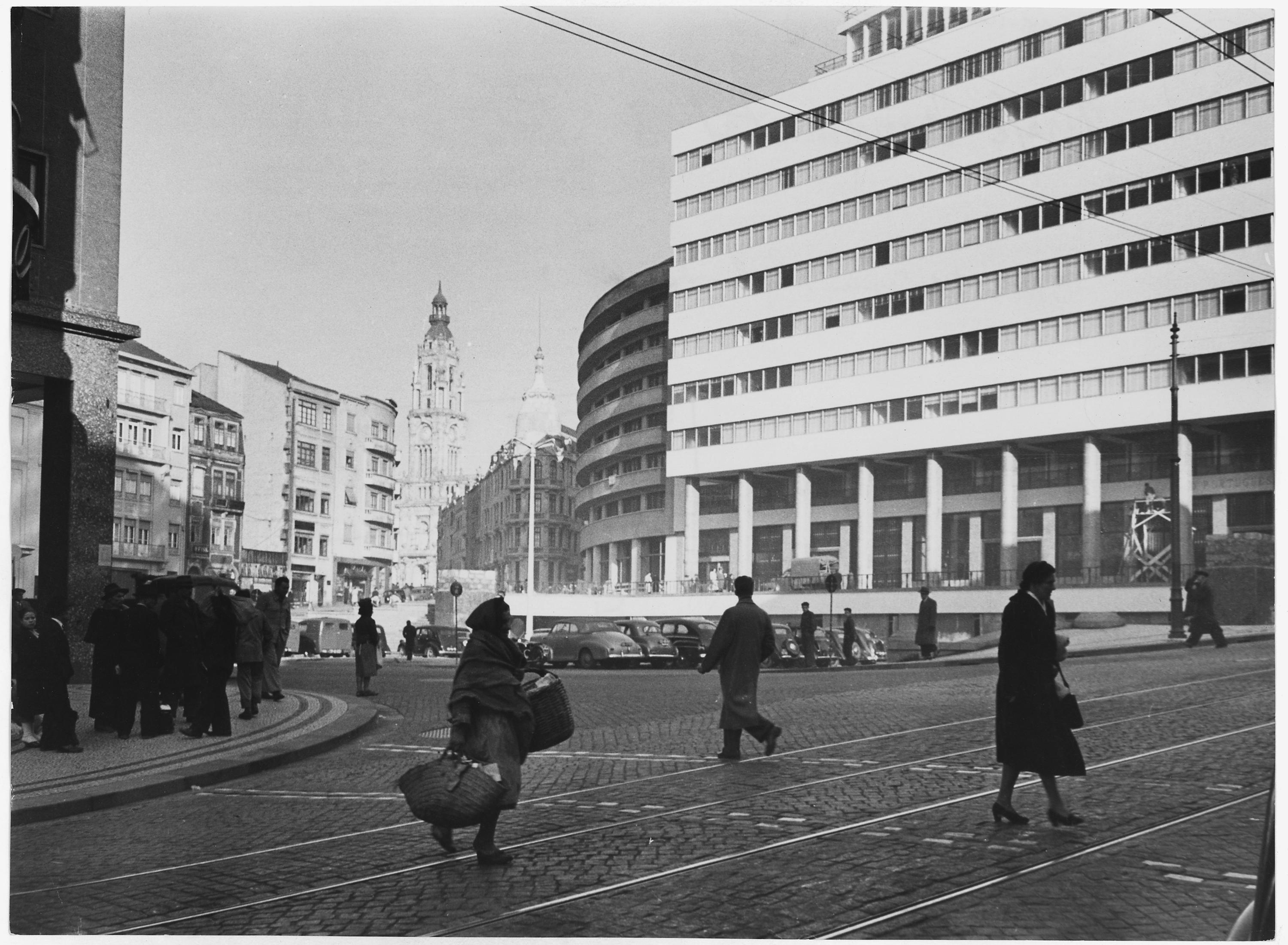
- Bank headquarters in Porto, Praça de D. João I, known as Palácio Atlântico (photo by Charles Fenno Jacobs circa 1948-1955)
- Company type: Public company
- Traded as: Atlântico
- Industry: Finance and Insurance
- Founded: 1942
- Founder: Arthur Cupertino de Miranda, António Cupertino de Miranda
- Defunct: 2000
- Fate: Acquired by Banco Comercial Português
- Headquarters: Porto, Portugal
- Products: Financial services
- Owner: Banco Comercial Português
- Subsidiaries: Banco Comercial de Angola (BCA), Bank of Lisbon and South Africa
- Website: bpa.pt

Banco Português do Atlântico (Portuguese pronunciation: [ˈbɐ̃ku puɾtuˈɣeʒ ðu ɐˈtlɐ̃tiku], lit. 'Portuguese Bank of the Atlantic', BPA) was a Portuguese bank based in Porto that operated between 1942 and 2000. It was founded on 31 December 1942 in Porto as a successor to the banking house Cupertino de Miranda & Company, founded in 1919. Banco Comercial Português (BCP) acquired BPA in 1995 and absorbed it in 2000.

== History ==
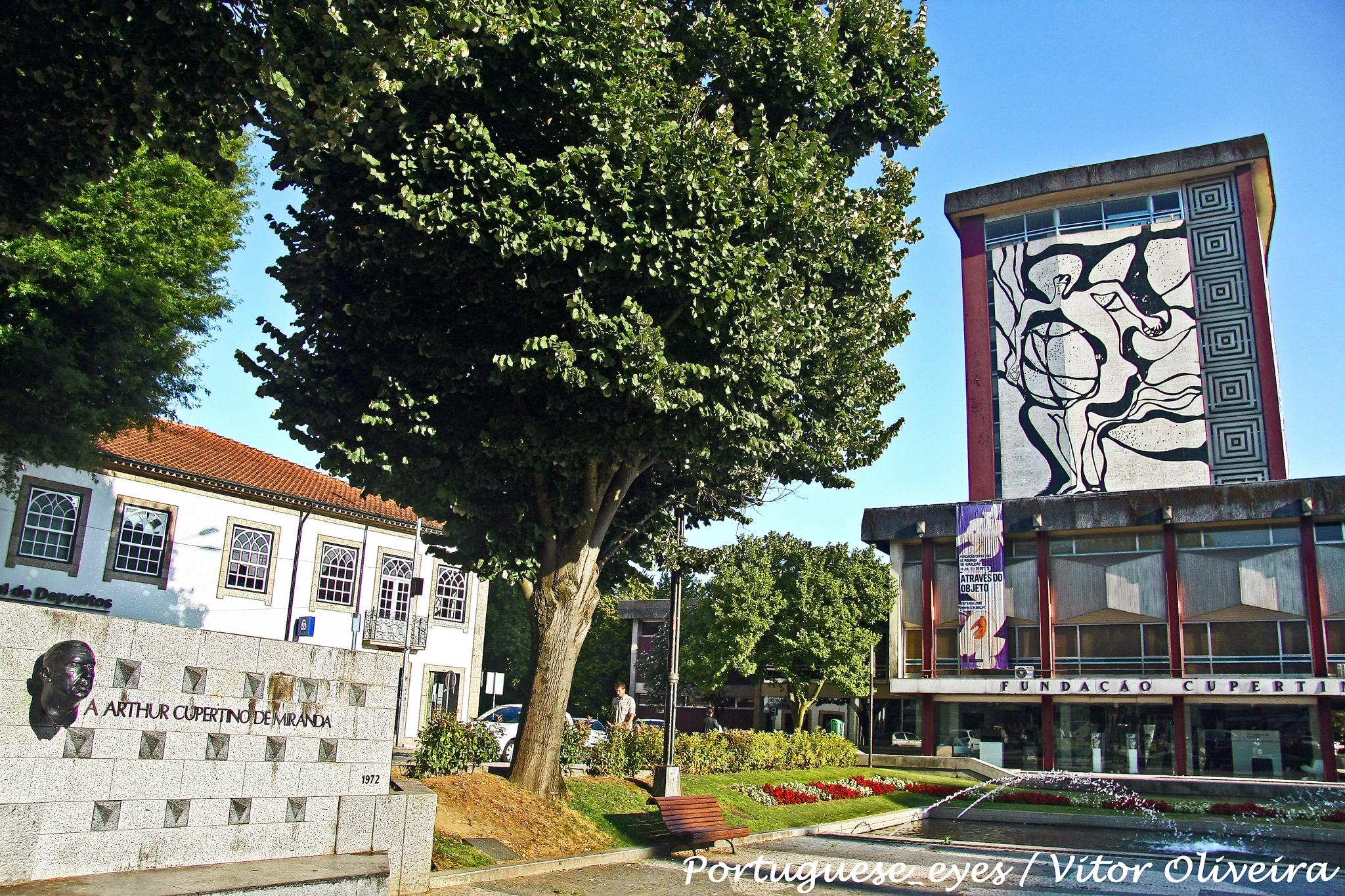
Cupertino de Miranda Foundation in Vila Nova de Famalicão, established and named after the BPA founder.

In 1919, Arthur Cupertino de Miranda and his brother António opened a banking house called Casa Bancária Cupertino de Miranda & Irmão, Lda in Porto. It was renamed Banco Português do Atlântico in 1942.

In 1950, BPA absorbed Banco Português do Continente e Ilhas (est. 21 June 1923 in Lisbon).

BPA established a 50-50 joint venture in 1957 in Angola, the Banco Comercial de Angola (BCA), sharing the ownership with Belgian Bank of Africa, an affiliate of Banque de Bruxelles. In 1971, Barclays Bank acquired an equity position in BCA, while BPA in turn took over Barclays' operations in Mozambique. In 1974, BCA's subsidiary in Macao became Banco Comercial de Macau, and a subsidiary of BPA. In time, Banco Comercial de Angola became the Mozambique government-owned bank Banco de Poupança e Crédito.

In 1965 Banco Nacional Ultramarino, Banco Português do Atlântico, Banco de Angola, and the South African company, General Mining and Finance, founded Bank of Lisbon and South Africa. This was later renamed Mercantile Lisbon Bank. Also in 1965 BPA absorbed Banco Raposo de Magalhães (est. 27 July 1942 in Alcobaça).

=== Nationalization ===
The Portuguese government nationalized BPA on 14 March 1975.

On 1 January 1977, BPA absorbed Banco do Algarve and Banco Fernandes Magalhães. Banco do Algarve had been established on 18 March 1932 in Faro to reconstitute the operations of Casa Bancária de Manuel Dias Sancho. Banco Fernandes Magalhães had been established in 1954, in Porto, as a successor to Casa Bancária Fernandes Magalhães, established in 1905).

=== Re-privatization ===
In 1990 the Portuguese government started to privatize BPA in tranches.

In 1993 BPA established BPA Brasil. The bank came about when in February 1992 BPA bought the Royal Bank of Canada in Brazil. BPA also opened a branch in Maputo. BPA indirectly acquired control of Uniao de Bancos Portugueses (UBP), Portugal's 11th largest bank with 173 branches.

In 1994, BPA opened a representative office in Caracas, and set up a subsidiary in the Cayman Islands, BPA Overseas Bank.

In 1997, Wachovia Bank acquired a majority interest in Banco Portugues do Atlantico-Brasil, which at the time was a $100 million-asset bank based in São Paulo. The bank was engaged principally in corporate trade finance.

In 1998 Banco Central Hispano acquired BPA's local business is Spain as BCH was a partner of BCP. BPA had offices in Madrid, Vigo and Barcelona, with a balance sheet of 55m ptas.

In 2000, BCP received permission from the FDIC to establish BPA Bank in Newark, New Jersey.

== See also ==
- Jorge Jardim Gonçalves
