= Bank Millennium =

Polish bank

Bank Millennium SA

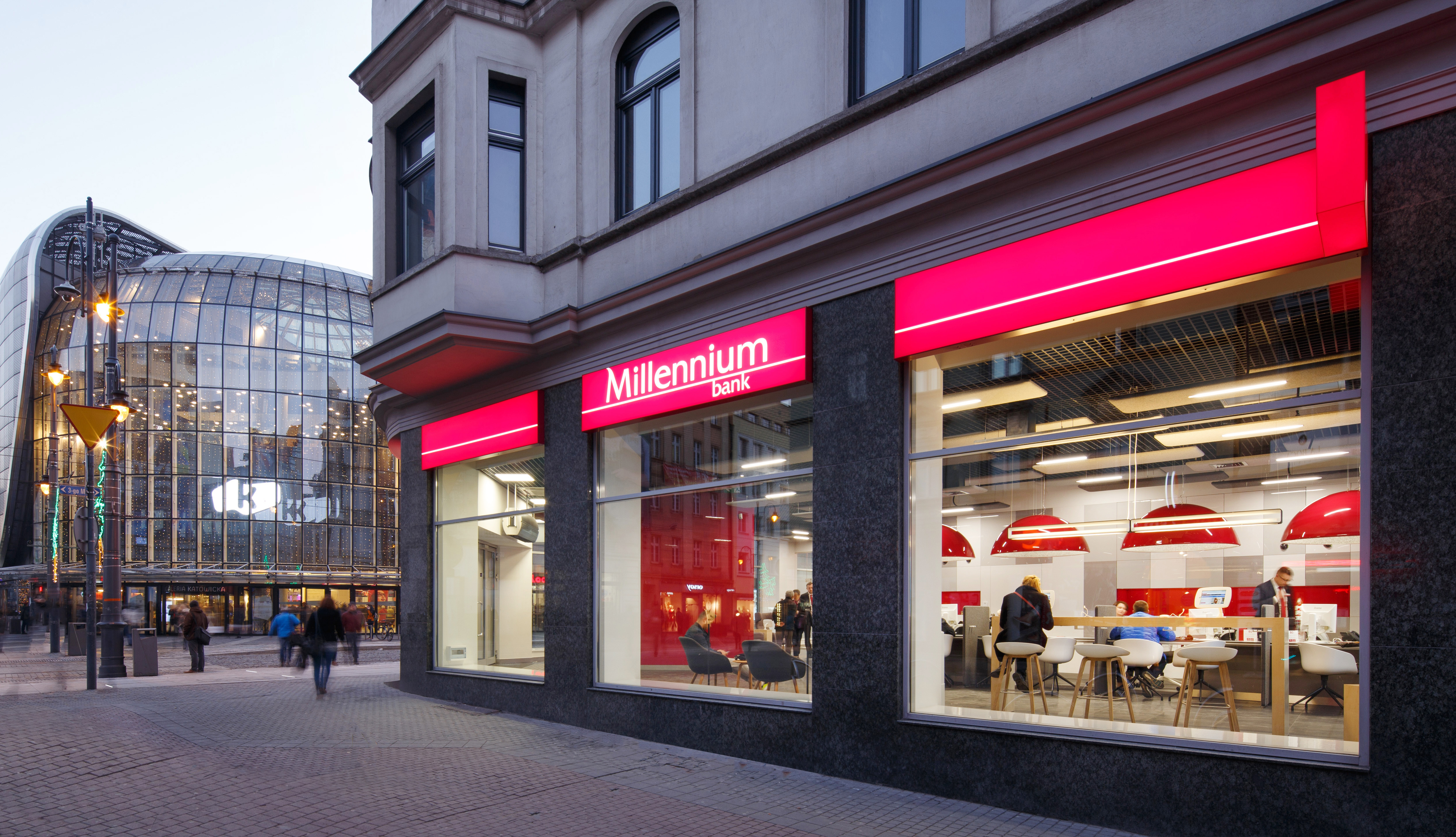
- A branch of Bank Millennium in Katowice
- Formerly: Bank Inicjatyw Gospodarczych
- Type: Spółka Akcyjna
- Traded as: WSE: MIL
- Industry: Finance and Insurance
- Predecessor: BIG Bank Gdański
- Founded: 1989; 37 years ago
- Headquarters: Warsaw, Poland
- Area served: Poland
- Key people: Joao Bras Jorge CEO
- Products: Financial services
- Operating income: ▲PLN 6.9 billion (2025)
- Net income: ▲PLN1.2 billion (2025)
- Total assets: ▲PLN 155.6 billion (2025)
- Owner: Banco Comercial Português (50,1%)
- Subsidiaries: Euro Bank, Millennium Leasing, Millennium Dom Maklerski, Millennium Towarzystwo Funduszy Inwestycyjnych, Goodie, Millennium Bank Hipoteczny
- Website: https://www.bankmillennium.pl

Bank Millennium S.A. is a commercial bank based in Warsaw. It is one of the most systemically important banks in Poland.

Originating in the 1997 merger of Bank Inicjatyw Gospodarczych (lit. 'Bank of Economic Initiatives') and Bank Gdański (lit. 'Bank of Gdańsk') to form BIG Bank Gdański, it has been majority-owned by Lisbon-based Banco Comercial Português since 2000 and adopted the Millennium brand in 2003. In 2018, it was the 7th bank in Poland in terms of asset value.

== History ==
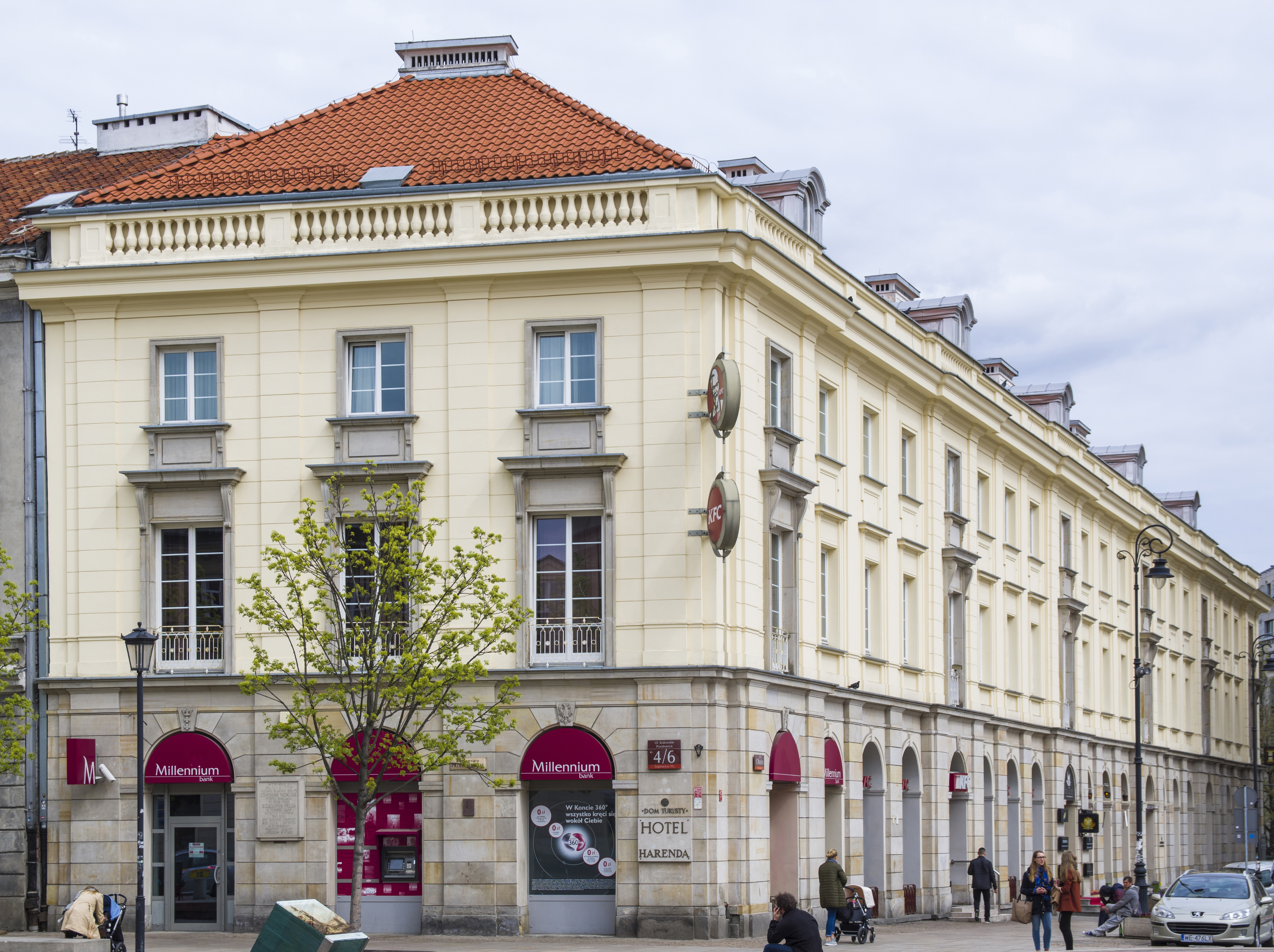
A branch of Bank Millennium in Warsaw, Krakowskie Przedmieście Street

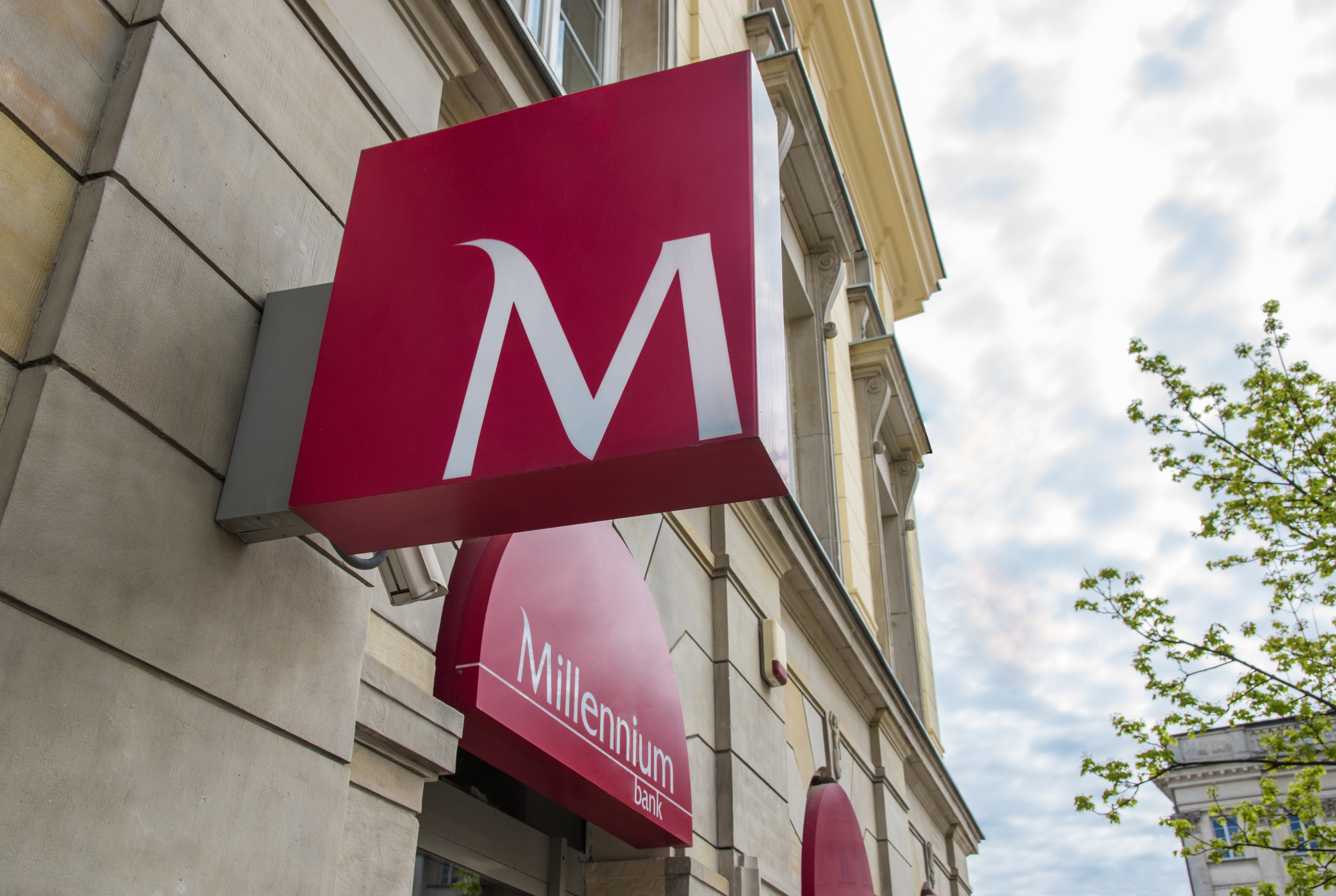
A branch of Bank Millennium in Warsaw, Krakowskie Przedmieście Street

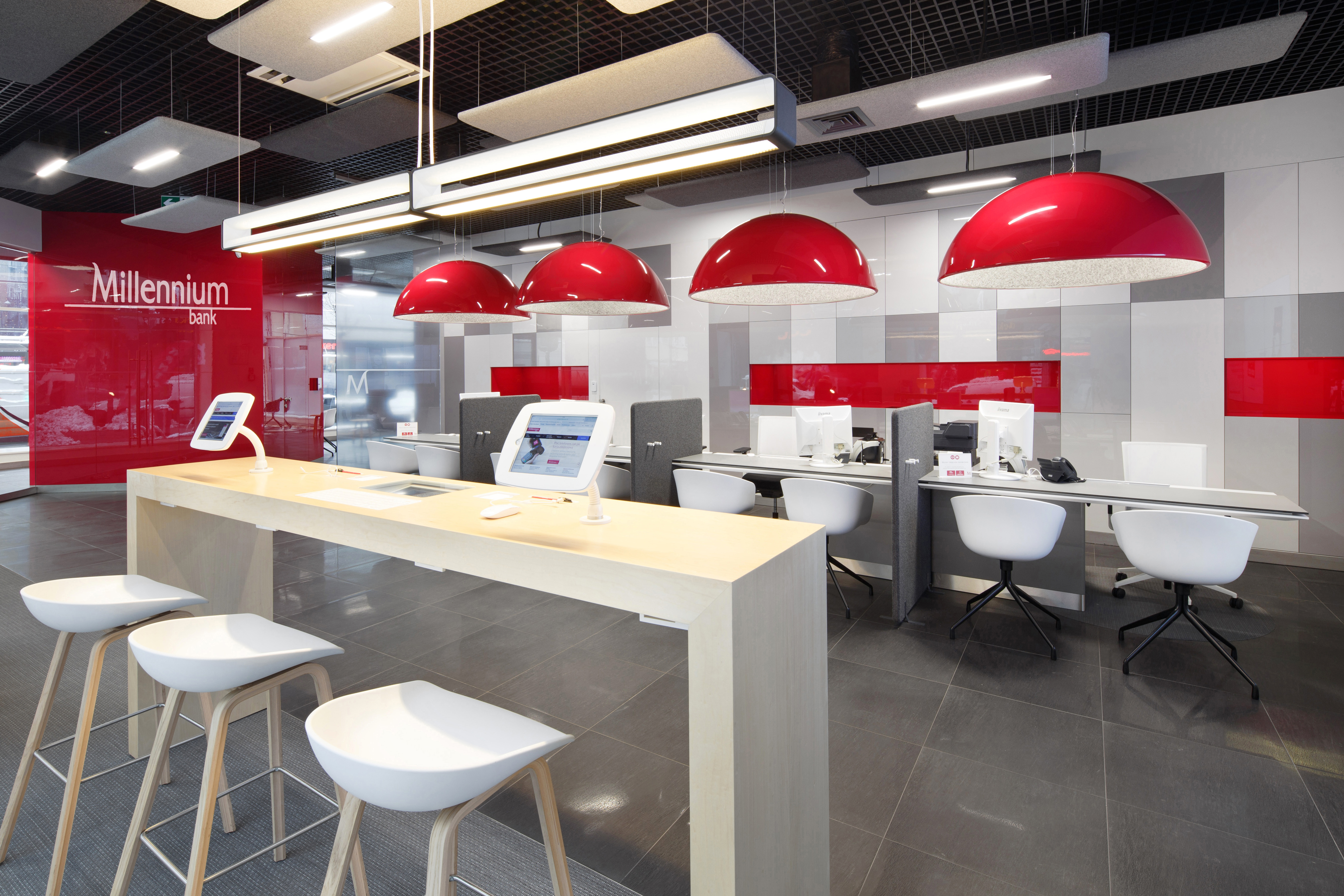
Financial Center in Katowice, Stawowa 13 Street

=== Predecessors and 1997 merger ===
Bank Inicjatyw Gospodarczych (BIG SA) was established in 1989. Initially, 98% of shares in it were owned by Warta, Poczta Polska, PZU, Universal and Transakcja foreign trade headquarters (KC PZPR and ZSMP), and 2% were held by natural persons. In 1992 the Bank's shares debuted on the Warsaw Stock Exchange, the first public offering of a financial institution in Poland since the end of the Communist system.

Bank Gdański was one of nine banks spun off in the late 1980s from the National Bank of Poland, the culmination of a sequence of reforms during the 1980s that brought an end to the country's single-tier banking system. It was reorganized in 1991 as a joint-stock corporation.

In 1997 BIG merged with Bank Gdański to form BIG Bank Gdański, and Banco Comercial Português (BCP) acquired a 44.1-percent stake in the merged entity while Eureko acquired a further 15 percent.. A year later, in cooperation with BCP, BIG Bank Gdański launched the Millennium retail service network.

=== Later developments ===
By 2018, BCP held 50.1% shares of Bank Millennium.

May 31, 2019 Bank Millennium S.A. took over Euro Bank as a result of acquiring about 99.79% of the shares that were bought from Société Générale. On September 10, 2019, the Polish Financial Supervision Authority (KNF) granted permission to merge banks. On October 1, 2019, there was a legal merger, Bank Millennium and Euro Bank became one bank. In 2021, the banks subsidiary Millennium Bank Hipoteczny (Millennium Mortgage Bank) began operation as a specialized mortgage bank.

== Operations ==
The bank offers its services through a network of branches, online, phone and mobile banking to personal customers (in Retail, Prestige and Private Banking segments), to sole traders and microbusinesses as well as medium and large companies in the corporate banking segment.

In 2020, the bank had over 2.6 million active individual customers. In its development strategy, the bank focuses on modern service channels. The number of clients actively using electronic banking exceeded 2 million in 2020, and from the Millenet mobile and mobile application 1.7 million (+ 18% y/y).

Apart from the bank the most important companies in the Group are: Millennium Leasing (lease business), Millennium Dom Maklerski (brokerage business), Millennium TFI (mutual funds) and Millennium Goodie. The offerings of these companies complement the services and products offered by the bank. Joint Stock Company listed since 1992 on the Warsaw Stock Exchange in Warsaw. The bank's shares are included in WIG 30 index and were included in the Respect Index until its discontinuation in 2020. Bank Millennium is now included in the FTSE4Good Emerging Index, which comprises companies from more than 20 countries, which stand out in terms of environmental efforts, corporate social responsibility and corporate governance.

== Governing bodies ==
As of September 2026, the management board was made up of:

- Joao Bras Jorge – Chairman
- Fernando Bicho – Deputy Chairman
- Jarosław Hermann
- Marcin Dubno
- Halina Karpińska
- Hugo Resende
- Magdalena Zmitrowicz

As of September 2026, the supervisory board was made up of:

- Olga Grygier-Siddons – Chairperson
- Nuno Manuel da Silva Amado – Deputy Chairman
- Katarzyna Sułkowska – Secretary
- Małgorzata Bonikowska
- Miguel de Campos
- Pereira de Bragança
- Agnieszka Kłos-Siddiqui
- Anna Mankiewicz-Rębkowska
- Alojzy NowakIzabela Olszewska
- José Miguel Bensliman Schorcht da Silva Pessanha
- Miguel Maya
- Dias Pinheiro
- Lingjiang Xu

== Shareholder structure ==
As of 31 December 2025, the bank's main shareholders are:

- Banco Comercial Português 50,10%
- Nationale-Nederlanden OFE 9,72%
- Allianz Polska OFE 8,09%

== See also ==
- List of banks in Poland
