= Banco de Poupança e Crédito =

Angolan commercial bank

Coordinates: 08°49′05″S 13°14′07″E

Savings and Credit Bank
- Industry: Banking, Financial services
- Founded: 1956; 69 years ago
- Headquarters: Luanda, Angola
- Area served: Angola
- Key people: António André Lopes; Chief Executive Officer
- Number of employees: 4,820 (2020)
- Website: www.bpc.ao/bpc/en/

Banco de Poupança e Crédito (BPC; English: Savings and Credit Bank) is a government-owned, full service bank in Angola. With some 68 branches, including one in Cabinda, it has the largest branch network in the country.

== Overview ==
BPC is a large financial services institution serving the retail banking market in Angola, with focus on the small and medium enterprises in the country. As of 2016, BPC was the largest public bank in Angola. It was also the second largest commercial bank in the country by market share, accounting for 23.4 percent of all banking customers in the nation at that time.

== History ==
In 1956 the Banco Comercial de Angola was founded in Lisbon, but with half the shares being in the hands of the Belgian Banque de Bruxelles. It immediately opened an office in Luanda. The bank transferred its head office to Luanda in 1967. Later the bank was owned by the Banco Português do Atlântico. In 1971, Barclays Bank received shares in Banco Português do Atlântico in return for contributing its branches in Mozambique to Banco Comercial de Angola.

After independence in 1975, the Angolan government nationalized the bank and changed its name to Banco Popular de Angola. At about the same time, the government in São Tomé and Príncipe nationalized its branch in that country, incorporating it into what is now the Central Bank of São Tomé and Príncipe. Banco Comercial de Angola also had an office in Macau that in 1974 became Banco Comercial de Macau, as a subsidiary of Banco Português do Atlântico. The Government of Mozambique nationalized the operations there belonging to the bank, incorporating them into the Banco de Moçambique. In 1991, the government changed the name of Banco Popular de Angola to the present name Banco de Poupança e Crédito.

=== Reorganization and recapitalization ===
BPC accumulated a huge number of non-performing loans (NPL), in the period ending in December 2017. The NPL ratio ballooned from 4.5 percent in 2016 to 23.2 percent in 2017.

In May 2017, the government of Angola created a public entity for asset recovery called Recredit, for the sole purpose of buying bad loans from BPC, Angola’s largest bank by assets at that time. Initially capitalized with US$2 billion, the government borrowed another US$3.5 billion from the International Monetary Fund to further recapitalize Recredit and thereby provide liquidity to BPC in order to lend more to Angolan businesses. Other rationalization measures include trimming down the number of employees from 4,820 to 3,220, by letting 1,600 go, either through regular retirement, early retirement or termination. The number of bank branches will also be trimmed.

In August 2020, the first group of 156 employees were terminated and 53 service points closed. It is expected that another 120 employees will be released soon after and another 11 service points closed. The terminated employees receive 6 months of family health insurance, loan forgiveness for loans below AOA:25 million (US$40,500) or reduction of interest rates for larger loans, free tuition for two professional courses and cash severance payments of AOA:10 million (US$16,000).

== Shareholding ==
The table below illustrates the shareholding in BPC in 2016, before restructuring and the shareholding expected in 2022 after reorganization.

Shareholding In Banco de Poupança e Crédito
Rank	Name of Owner	% Ownership Before 2016	% Ownership After 2022 (Expected)
1	Angola Ministry of Finance	75.0	53.3
2	Angola National Social Security Institute	15.0	5.6
3	State Assets and Participations Institute (IGAPE)	0.0	37.3
4	Social Security Fund of the Angolan Armed Forces	10.0	5.3
	Total	100.00	100.00

== See also ==
- List of banks in Angola
