= Mozambican metical =

Currency of Mozambique

Metical moçambicano (Portuguese)

ISO 4217
- Code: MZN (numeric: 943)
- Subunit: 0.01

Unit
- Plural: meticais
- Symbol: MT, MTn

Denominations
- Subunit
- 1/100: centavo
- Banknotes: 20, 50, 100, 200, 500, 1000 meticais
- Coins
- Freq. used: 1, 10, 50 centavos, 1, 2, 5, 10 meticais
- Rarely used: 5, 20 centavos (discontinued, still legal tender)

Demographics
- User(s): Mozambique

Issuance
- Central Bank: Bank of Mozambique
- Website: www.bancomoc.mz

Valuation
- Inflation: 10.3%
- Source: 2023 est.

The metical (/ˈmɛtɪˌkæl/; plural: meticais) is the currency of Mozambique, abbreviated with the symbol MZN or MT. It is nominally divided into 100 centavos. The name metical comes from Arabic مثقال (mithqāl), a unit of weight and an alternative name for the gold dinar coin that was used throughout much of Africa until the 19th century.

== History ==
=== First metical ===
The metical (MZM) replaced the escudo at par on 16 June 1980. The metical was announced by Samora Machel on 15 June 1980 at 8pm, and was officially introduced the next day, which was also the 20th anniversary of the Mueda massacre.

Machel saw the introduction of the metical as a matter of patriotic importance; it represented the elimination of Portuguese colonialism in Mozambique and positively reflected on the efforts of those who fought against colonial rule in the country. Machel told the public that the new coins and banknotes celebrated the working class and peasantry, the Popular Forces for the Liberation of Mozambique (FPLM, now the Mozambique Defence Armed Forces), and the heroic people of Mozambique. When asked why a new national currency was only now being implemented after five years of independence, Machel emphasised the importance of the Bank of Mozambique and how it had to establish itself as the centre of commerce in the nation before a new currency could be introduced. Machel stated that the introduction of the metical was only one step in planning for the future of Mozambique, and encouraged the people of Mozambique to work hard, be frugal, share in austerity and guard themselves from negligence and wastefulness in order to further the Mozambican economy. Machel ended his speech with a call to action:

"Let us make the creation of the Metical a moment of popular mobilization. A moment of our full engagement in the battle for victory against underdevelopment, the elimination of hunger, nakedness, poverty, illiteracy and the triumph of socialism in our dear country. Let the creation of the Metical be a time of joy and popular celebration, expressing our patriotic feelings, for this historic achievement of our people. The struggle continues! Revolution will win! Socialism will triumph!"

The metical was divided into 100 centavos. It underwent severe inflation. After the revaluation of the Romanian leu on 1 July 2005, the metical briefly became the least valued currency unit, at a value of about 24,500 meticais per USD, until the Zimbabwean dollar took the title in late August 2005.

=== Second metical ===
On 1 July 2006, Mozambique redenominated the metical at a rate of 1000:1. The new ISO 4217 code is MZN. New coins and banknotes were introduced on 1 July 2006, and the transitional period during which both old and new meticais could be used lasted until 31 December 2006. During the conversion, the new currency was locally abbreviated as MTn, but has since largely returned to MT.

Old meticais were redeemed by the Bank of Mozambique for a period of six years, until 31 December 2012.

== Coins ==
=== First metical ===
In 1980, coins were introduced in denominations of 50 centavos, 1, 2 1/2, 5, 10 and 20 meticais. The 50 centavos, 2 1/2 and 5 meticais were minted in aluminium, with the 1 metical in brass and the 10 and 20 meticais in cupro-nickel. In 1986, aluminium 1, 10, 20 and 50 meticais were introduced. A new coinage issued in 1994 was composed of 1, 5, 10, 20, 50, 100, 500 and 1000 meticais, with the lower four denominations in brass clad steel and the higher denominations in nickel clad steel. 5000 meticais coins were introduced in 1998, followed by 10,000 meticais in 2003.

=== Second metical ===
From 1 July 2006, coins were issued in denominations of 1, 5, 10, 20, 50 centavos and 1, 2, 5, 10 meticais.

From June 2024 new coins will circulate withe new images and the removal of the 5 and 20 centavos coins

Coins of the Mozambican metical (2006 "Banco de Moçambique" series)
Value	Technical parameters				Description		Date of issue
Value	Diameter	Mass	Composition	Edge	Obverse	Reverse	Date of issue
1 centavo	15 mm	2 grams	Copper-plated steel	Reeded	Rhinoceros	Logo of the Banco de Moçambique	2006
5 centavos	19 mm	2.3 grams	Copper-plated steel	Reeded	Leopard	Logo of the Banco de Moçambique	2006
10 centavos	17 mm	3.06 grams	Brass-plated steel	Reeded	Farm tractor	Logo of the Banco de Moçambique	2006
20 centavos	19.5 mm	4.1 grams	Brass-plated steel	Reeded	Cotton plant	Logo of the Banco de Moçambique	2006
50 centavos	23 mm	5.74 grams	Brass-plated steel	Reeded	Kingfisher bird	Logo of the Banco de Moçambique	2006
1 metical	21 mm	5.3 grams	Nickel-plated steel	Plain (seven-sided sections)	Female student (representing the allegory of education)	Logo of the Banco de Moçambique	2006
2 meticais	24 mm	6 grams	Nickel-plated steel	Segmented reeding	Fish	Logo of the Banco de Moçambique	2006
5 meticais	27 mm	6.5 grams	Nickel-plated steel	Reeded	Xylophone	Logo of the Banco de Moçambique	2006
10 meticais	24.92 mm	7.51 grams	Bi-metallic coin consisting of a Nickel-plated steel center plug with a brass outer ring	Reeded	Headquarters of the Banco de Moçambique	Logo of the Banco de Moçambique	2006

Coins of the Mozambican metical (2024 series)
value	Diameter	mass	Composition	Edge	reverse	obverse	Date of issue
1 centavo	17 mm	2 g	copper plated steel	reeded		Logo of the Banco de Moçambique	2024
10 centavos	20 mm	3 g	brass plated steel	reeded	boat	Logo of the Banco de Moçambique	2024
50 centavos	21 mm	3.6 g	nickel plated steel	reeded	palm trees	Logo of the Banco de Moçambique	2024
1 metical	21 mm	5.3 g	nickel plated steel	plain (seven- sided sections)	education	Logo of the Banco de Moçambique	2024
2 meticais	24 mm	6 g	nickel plated steel	segmented reeding	shrimp	Logo of the Banco de Moçambique	2024
5 meticais	27 mm	6.5 g	nickel plated steel	reeded	xylophone	Logo of the Banco de Moçambique	2024
10 meticais	25 mm	7.5 g	Bi-metallic coin consisting of a Nickel-plated steel center plug with a brass outer ring	reeded	Headquarters of the Banco de Moçambique	Logo of the Banco de Moçambique	2024

== Banknotes ==
=== First metical ===
The First Metical had three issues of notes as follows: i. In 1980 (16 June 1980), notes were introduced in denominations of 50, 100, 500 and 1,000 meticais. ii The same notes and denominations were reissued in 1983 (16 June 1983) with the new state logo, 5,000 meticais notes were introduced in 1989 (3 February 1989). iii. In 1991 (16 June 1991) 500, 1,000, 5,000, and 10,000 notes were issued followed by 50,000 and 100,000 meticais in 1993 (16 June 1993), 20,000 meticais in 1999 (16 June 1999) and 200,000 and 500,000 meticais in 2003 (16 June 2003).

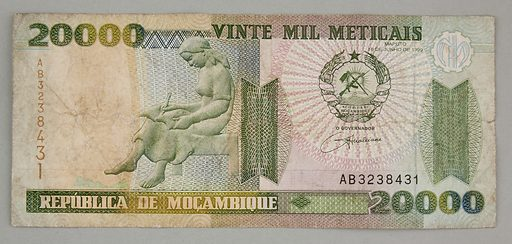
1999 bank note for 20000 meticals

=== Second metical ===
From 1 July 2006, new banknotes were issued in denominations of 20, 50, 100, 200, 500, and 1000 meticais. On 1 October 2011, Banco de Moçambique has issued a new family of banknotes that are similar to the 2006 series, but with enhanced security features. The three smaller denominations are now printed on polymer while the higher denominations remain printed on paper. The higher denominated metical banknotes are printed by De La Rue.

Banknotes of the Mozambican metical (16 June 2006 "Samora Machel" Issue)
Image	Value	Obverse	Reverse	Watermark
	20 meticais	Samora Moisés Machel	Rhinoceros	Samora Moisés Machel
	50 meticais	Samora Moisés Machel	Kudus	Samora Moisés Machel
	100 meticais	Samora Moisés Machel	Giraffes	Samora Moisés Machel
	200 meticais	Samora Moisés Machel	Lions	Samora Moisés Machel
	500 meticais	Samora Moisés Machel	Buffaloes	Samora Moisés Machel
	1000 meticais	Samora Moisés Machel	Elephants	Samora Moisés Machel

Banknotes of the Mozambican metical (16 June 2011 "Samora Machel" Issue)
Image	Value	Obverse	Reverse	Watermark
	20 meticais	Samora Moisés Machel	Rhinoceros	Samora Moisés Machel
	50 meticais	Samora Moisés Machel	Kudus	Samora Moisés Machel
	100 meticais	Samora Moisés Machel	Giraffes	Samora Moisés Machel
	200 meticais	Samora Moisés Machel	Lions	Samora Moisés Machel
	500 meticais	Samora Moisés Machel	Buffaloes	Samora Moisés Machel
	1000 meticais	Samora Moisés Machel	Elephants	Samora Moisés Machel

Mozambique will introduce a new series of metical notes and coins from June 16, 2024, which will progressively replace those that have been in circulation since 2006, the central bank governor announced on May 17th.

Banknotes of the Mozambican metical (16 June 2024 "Samora Machel" Issue)
image	value	obverse	reverse
	20 meticais	Samora Moisés Machel	stick figures; plant, tree, mountains; bird on branch
	50 meticais	Samora Moisés Machel	stick figures; wildlife; antelope
	100 meticais	Samora Moisés Machel	stick figures; baskets of vegetables and fruit
	200 meticais	Samora Moisés Machel	stick figures; reclining lioness with cubs and standing lion
	500 meticais	Samora Moisés Machel	stick figures; sail boats
	1000 meticais	Samora Moisés Machel	stick figures; five elephants walking in field with trees behind

Current MZN exchange rates
From Google Finance:	AUD CAD CHF CNY EUR GBP HKD JPY USD ZAR EUR JPY
From Yahoo! Finance:	AUD CAD CHF CNY EUR GBP HKD JPY USD ZAR EUR JPY
From XE.com:	AUD CAD CHF CNY EUR GBP HKD JPY USD ZAR EUR JPY
From OANDA:	AUD CAD CHF CNY EUR GBP HKD JPY USD ZAR EUR JPY

== See also ==
- Economy of Mozambique

First metical
Preceded by: Mozambican escudo Ratio: at par	Currency of Mozambique; 1980 – 30 June 2006	Succeeded by: Second metical Reason: inflation Ratio: 1 second metical = 1000 first meticais

Second metical
Preceded by: First metical Reason: inflation Ratio: 1 second metical = 1000 old meticais	Currency of Mozambique; 1 July 2006 –	Succeeded by: Current
