= Banco Comercial Português =

Portuguese bank

Banco Comercial Português S.A.

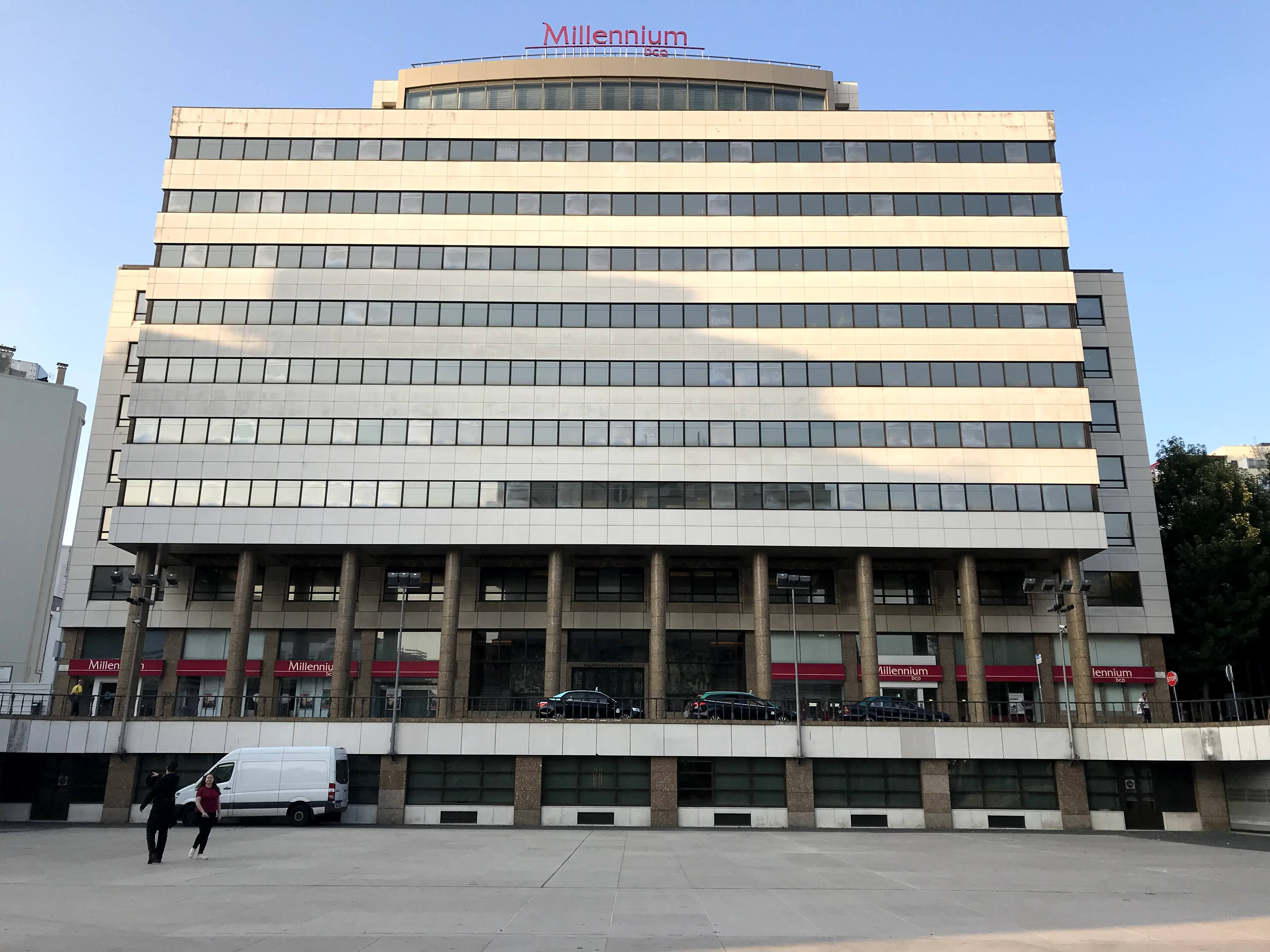
- Bank headquarters in Porto, Praça de D. João I, known as Palácio Atlântico
- Type: Public (Sociedade Anónima)
- Traded as: Euronext Lisbon: BCP; PSI-20 component
- ISIN: PTBCP0AM0015
- Industry: Banking, Financial services
- Founded: 1985
- Headquarters: Porto, Portugal
- Key people: Miguel Maya (CEO), Nuno Amado (Chairman of the supervisory board)
- Products: Retail, corporate banking, investment banking, insurance, fund management
- Net income: €856.0 million (2023)
- Total assets: €109.333 billion (Q4 2025)
- Total equity: €7,299.5 million (end 2023)
- Number of employees: 15,688 (end, 2023)
- Subsidiaries: ActivoBank, Millennium bcp, Millennium bim, Bank Millennium
- Website: www.millenniumbcp.pt

Banco Comercial Português (BCP, lit. 'Portuguese Commercial Bank') is a Portuguese bank that was founded in 1985 and is the largest private bank in the country. BCP is a member of the Euronext 100 stock index and its current chief executive officer is Miguel Maya Dias Pinheiro. BCP is based in Porto, but its operations are headquartered in Oeiras, Greater Lisbon. It operates a branch brand-dubbed and restyled in 2004 as Millennium BCP as well as Banque BCP and ActivoBank.

It has nearly 4.3 million customers throughout the world and over 695 branches in Portugal. It was ranked at number 1,633 of the world's largest companies in 2023.

BCP has been designated as a Significant Institution since the entry into force of European Banking Supervision in late 2014, and as a consequence is directly supervised by the European Central Bank.

== History ==
BCP was founded in 1985 by a group of about 200 investors, a year after Portugal opened its banking system to private initiative. They recruited Jardim Gonçalves from Banco Português do Atlântico as its chairman.

=== Capital Consolidation ===
In 2012, Millennium in the middle of the European sovereign debt crisis, BCP received €3 billion in state support through the issuance of contingent convertible bonds with an interest rate of around 10%.

In 2014, Millennium BCP raised €2.25 billion in fresh capital through a rights issue reserved for shareholders. With the results of that the bank repaid €2.25 billion of the CoCo bonds.

As of 2015, Millennium BCP reported a profit of €235.3 million euros, returning to profits after four years of losses.

In 2017 the bank raised another €1.5 billion through a rights issue for shareholders as well as the direct sale of shares to Chinese conglomerate Fosun International. Immediately after that capital raising, Millennium BCP paid off the remaining €700 million in CoCo bonds, thereby regaining its autonomy from the state and ending any possibility of nationalization through a forced conversion of the bonds. The remaining funds from the rights issue will be used to strengthen the bank's capital ratios. The bank estimates it has contributed more than €1 billion to state coffers since 2012, mainly interest paid on the CoCo bonds.

Millennium BCP also operates in Africa through Millennium bim (Banco Internacional de Moçambique) in Mozambique and Banco Millennium Atlântico in Angola. One BCP branch is open in Macau, representative offices operate in Brazil, Switzerland, China, and the UK. As of 2023, BCP also owns 19% of Banque BCP in France (80% owned by Caisse d'Epargne Île-de-France).

Previously BCP operated in Greece (Τράπεζα Millennium Bank), Romania (sold to OTP Bank), and Turkey (Fibabanka). Banque Privée BCP (Suisse) was sold to Union Bancaire Privée in 2021.

== Shareholder structure ==
As of 31 December 2025, BCP's main shareholders are:

- Fosun International (20.45%)
- Sonangol Group (19,90%)

== Millennium BCP Brand ==
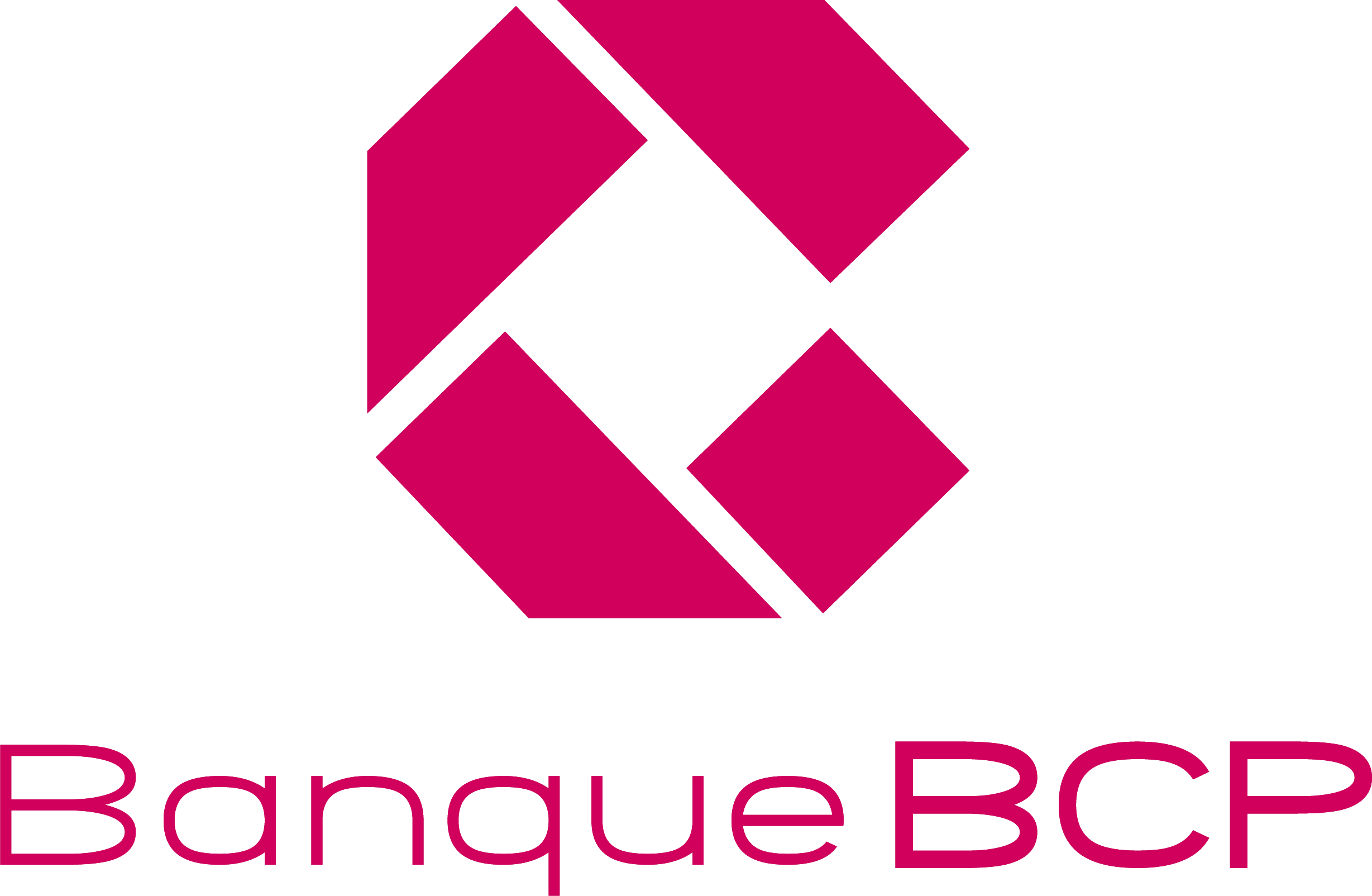
Logos of ActivoBank and Banque BCP

The introduction of the new Millennium BCP brand, in 2004, represented the final stage of a process that formally began with the implementation of a new business model by the end of 2001, but had been triggered by the merger by incorporation of the Banks Atlântico, Mello and SottoMayor into BCP, in 2000, unifying 4 brands in one only brand known to the public—the Millennium brand. The brand, at the time of its launch, came to break with the standards implemented at the level of the Portuguese banking sector: a differentiating color, demonstrating innovation, modernity/youth, dynamism, and quality.

In one single night, BCP rebranded its entire commercial network, reopening in the next day surprising the market with its new color and designation.

The strategic option to implement a single brand was fundamentally due to efficiency reasons, as it would allow rationalizing the investment in several brands and the back offices to support each brand and ensure a designation that could be implemented in all geographies (one common identity).

== Operations in Poland ==
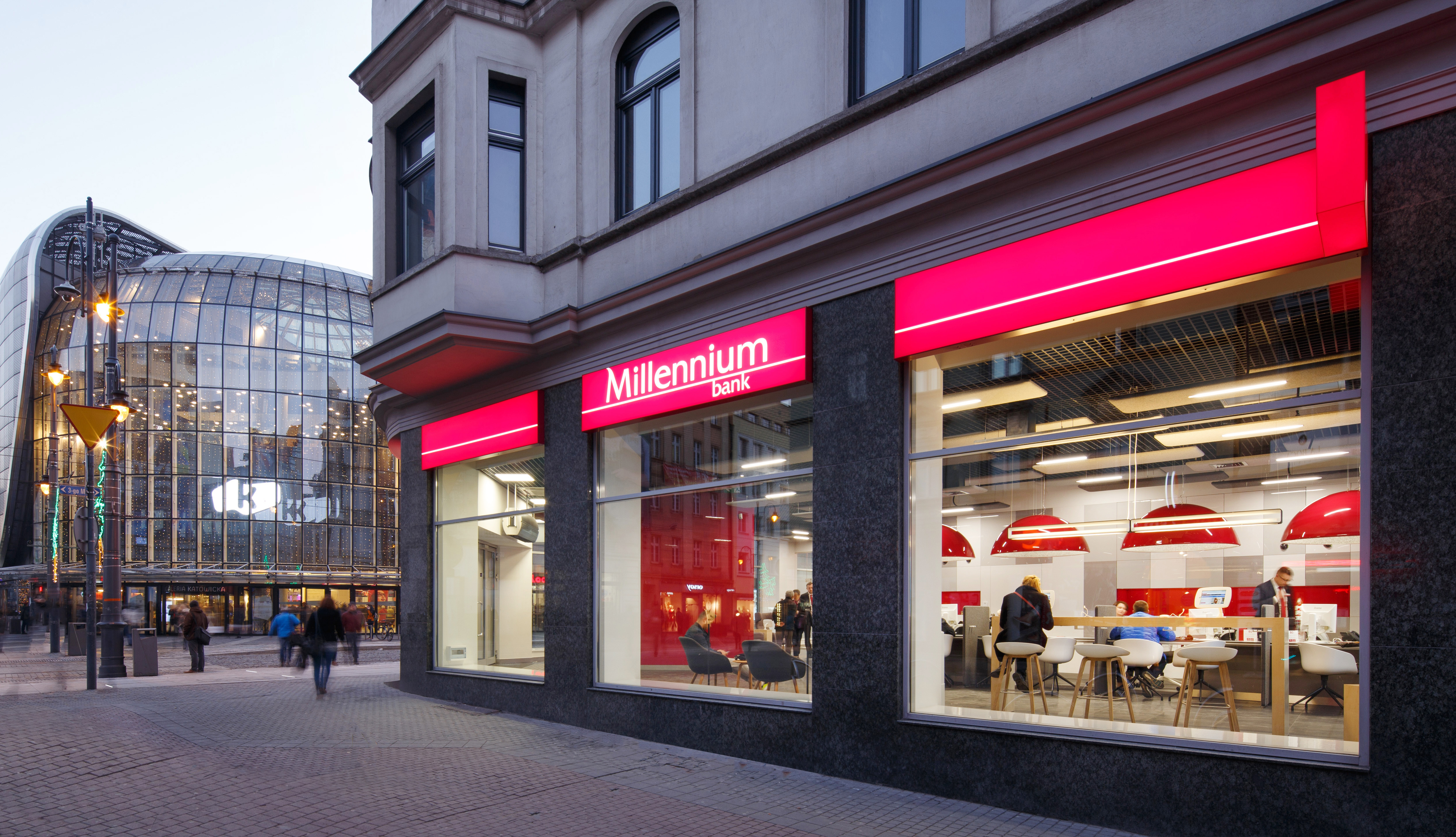
A branch of Bank Millennium in Poland

Bank Millennium is BCP's network of branches in Poland, founded in 1989.

== See also ==
- Estoril Open (tennis)
- List of banks in the euro area
- List of banks in Portugal
