= Bank of Mozambique =

Monetary authority of Mozambique

Bank of Mozambique Banco de Moçambique

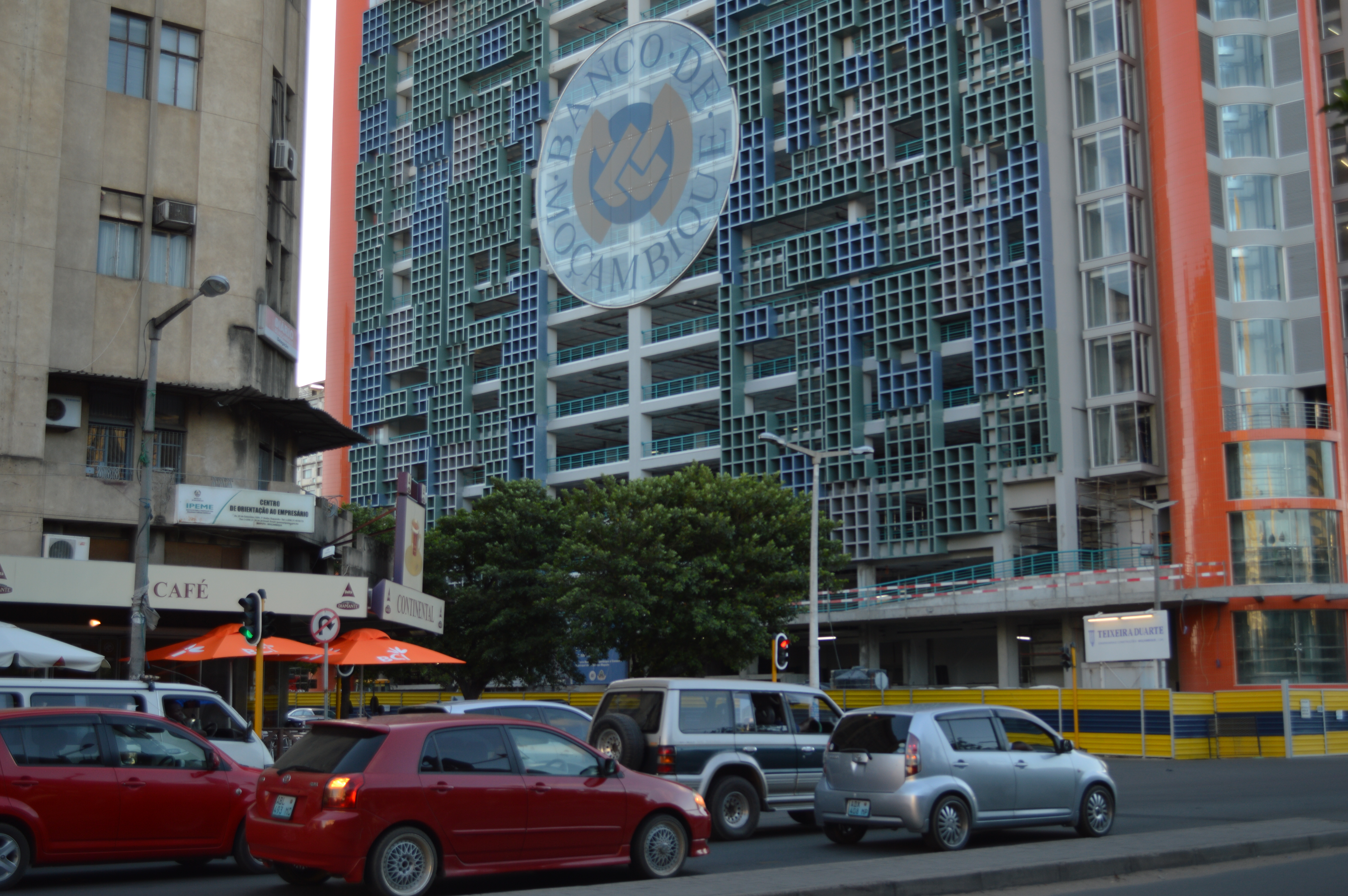
- Central bank of: Mozambique
- Headquarters: 1695 Avenida 25 de Setembro, Maputo
- Coordinates: 25°58′22″S 32°34′18″E
- Established: 17 May 1975
- Ownership: 100% state ownership
- Governor: Rogério Zandamela
- Currency: Mozambican metical MZN (ISO 4217)
- Reserves: 2 300 million USD
- Website: www.bancomoc.mz

The Bank of Mozambique (Portuguese: Banco de Moçambique) is the central bank of Mozambique. The bank does not function as a commercial bank, and has the responsibility of governing the monetary policies of the country. The president of the Republic appoints the governor. The bank is situated in the capital, Maputo, and has two branches, one in Beira and one in Nampula. The Bank of Mozambique is active in developing financial inclusion policy and is a member of the Alliance for Financial Inclusion.

== History ==
Most of Mozambique was a Portuguese overseas territory for several centuries. After independence in 1975, the newly created Government of Mozambique took over, without compensation, the Mozambican operations of Banco Nacional Ultramarino, a Portuguese colonial bank that had been acting as the bank of issue for the colony. This became the nucleus of Bank of Mozambique.

In 1977 the government also nationalized almost all banks in the country, including the Casa Bancária de Moçambique, and the Mozambican operations of Banco de Crédito, Comercial e Industrial and Banco Comercial de Angola, and merged them into Bank of Mozambique. At the same time it closed the operations of Banco de Fomento Nacional and Banco Pinto e Sotto Mayor. (The government permitted Banco Standard Totta de Moçambique to remain private.) It also created the Banco Popular de Desenvolvirmento by merging Crédito de Moçambique and Montepio de Moçambique.

In 1992, the Bank of Mozambique established a branch in Beira. A branch in Nampula followed in 1996.

In 1995, the government spun off the commercial banking operations of Bank of Mozambique into a newly created institution, the Banco Comercial de Moçambique (BCM). The government privatized BCM in 1997, and it merged with Banco Internacional de Moçambique (Millennium bim) in 2001.

== Introduction ==
The Bank of Mozambique (Portuguese name: Banco de Moçambique) is the central bank of Mozambique. It does not provide consumer services to general public as a commercial bank. The main responsibility of the bank is governing the monetary policy of the nation and ensuring a safe and stable financial system within Mozambique The Bank of Mozambique (BOM) has the sole issuing powers of currency notes and coins (BOM). The bank is responsible for the supervision of all 22 commercial banks in the country by exercising its power as the central bank of the country. Amid growing inflation and economic liberalization BOM is facing new challenges. Mozambique's privatisation has been one of the largest in Africa.

The International Monetary Fund have praised recent changes made by the bank regarding its monetary policy framework as commendable measures to bring the financial stability.

The headquarters is located in the capital, Maputo and two more branches are placed in Beira and Nampula. In 2018 the headquarters was shifted to a newly constructed building with 2 basements and 30 floors high and with a total building area of 25,900 m^{2}.

Mozambique is a former Portuguese colony located in Southeast Africa which had gained independence in 1975. It has a population of 30 million and covers a land area of 800,000 km^{2}. It is regarded as one of the poorest and most underdeveloped countries in the world.

== Economy of Mozambique ==
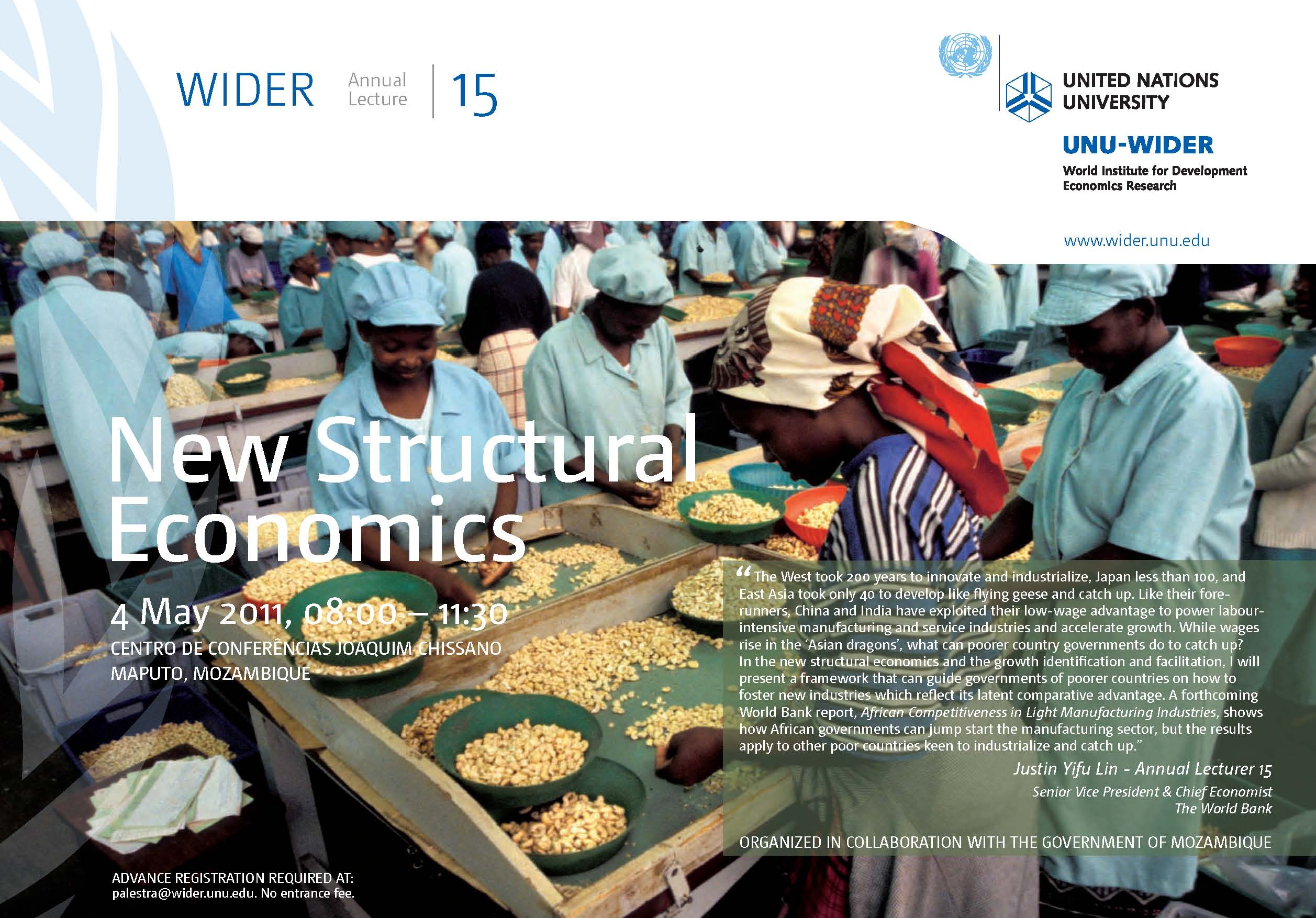
The New Structural Economy

Mozambique had transformed to a country with central planned economy from an incipient industrializing colonial society after the independence. The economy is largely reliant on low-productivity agriculture while manufacturing only accounts for less than 15% of GDP. Though economic conditions have improved over last decade, the country was remaining on a subdued growth trajectory following the 2015 commodity price shock and 2016 hidden loans crisis. Mozambique had reported a steep increase in inflation which reached 26% in November 2016. But over last few years, a commendable progress has been noted as the inflation was lower than 3% in 2020.

Over the past few years, Mozambique has gained a wide attraction from international investors with the prospect of vast mineral wealth offered by large-scale gas discoveries and the potential of its fledgling mining sector. But the raging civil wars and widespread corruptions hampered the utilization of these natural resources in a productive way. Maintaining the economic stability amid fluctuations of cost of living and rapidly changing political situation are country's main economic challenges. In that context regaining the stability through improved economic governance and transparency is the main responsibility vested on BOM.

== Development ==
The Bank of Mozambique (BOM) was founded in 1975 following the agreement made in the Lusaka Accords in 1974. Mozambique has made significant progresses in areas of monetary stabilization and economic liberalization throughout last decade. But still the obstacles it was inherited from colonial era like extreme poverty, weak institutions, and poor access to social services, and polarization of benefits of economic growth had hindered the progress. But there are controversies over the financial and monetary policies of the bank as it couldn't prevent corruptions in the lending market. Recently drafted strategic objectives of the bank for next three-year period of 2018–2020 is currently underway. This strategic plan mainly focuses on ensuing public interests amid growing privatization in the country.

== Governance and administration ==
=== Legislative framework ===
Article 132 of the Constitution of Mozambique had given legislative foundation for the inception of the bank.

=== Governor ===
Head of the bank is the governor, who is appointed by the president of the Republic. Current governor is Rogério Zandamela, who has been holding the post since 2016. Mozambican president Filipe Nyusi appointed him mainly because of his credentials for serving International Monetary Fund (IMF) for nearly two decades. He replaced Ernesto Gove, who had been in the post for 10 years.

The downward slide of Mozambican economy prompted the president to appoint a new officer for the post of governor. Gove joined the central bank in 1976 and held various positions in the foreign department, currency issuing and treasury department. Many expect that the BOM will revolutionize under the leadership of Rogério Zandamela. Specially his experience and ties with IMF are expected to bring positive impacts to the economy of Mozambique. The government appointed a board of directors to manage the bank, under the leadership of a governor.

== Functions ==
=== Advising to the government and legislation ===
BOM acts as the adviser to Government in financial matters including monetary policies and foreign exchange reserves. It represents the Mozambique government in international monetary affairs. Its activities are regulated by the statute laid down by the Law No 1/92 of 1992.

BOM also play an advisory role to the judicial bodies in granting approval for establishment of new banks, while making sure that there will be a fair and healthy competition that is beneficial to the public and not detrimental to the banks themselves. It also enforces anti-discrimination laws to the banking system to prevent any communal and racial discrimination in providing banking services. BOM had introduced certain laws that prevent banks by selectively excluding any communities from the services. As the country's central bank BOM regulates interest rates of commercial banks, take necessary actions and serves as the lender of last resort to all financial institutions at the times of financial crisis.

=== Regulation of commercial banks ===
As the central bank of the country, BOM regulates all the commercial banks in Mozambique. The government authorities have delegated most of their regulatory functions to the BOM. One of the main objective of this regulation is to ensure that all the commercial banks in the country conduct their business in an ethical and safe manner. The deposit guarantee mechanism was one of the key action taken by the bank to safeguard the savings of general public. Therefore, BOM can keep their eye on deposit and lending status of all the banks. It also defines reserve requirements to control inter-banking lending. They are calculated as a percentage of their demand deposits. The BOM intends to stimulate investment in small scale businesses by promoting money supply and easing rules to create affordable interest rates.

As a response to the COVID-19 pandemic BOM ordered all the commercial banks to renegotiate the terms and conditions of loans to provide customers a flexibility in repayment with effect from 23 March until 31 December 2020.

=== Supervision of financial and insurance system ===
The bank also plays the supervisory role of the insurance system in Mozambique by overseeing and regulating insurance companies in the country. Measures taken to promote microfinance market was another notable intervention taken by BOM to promote national economy over last few years.

=== Issuing currency notes ===
Issuing currency notes and coins is another important function of the BOM. Mozambique's official currency was changed to New Metical in March 2018, (US$1 is roughly equivalent to 62 New Meticals), replacing Metical. BOM regulates money supply depending on the economic situation of the country. When inflation started to rise in early 2000s the bank decided to cut down the money supply. Because keeping inflation low was the main priority of the bank.

=== Foreign exchange regulation ===
Foreign exchange regulation is another important function of the bank. BOM exercises government-imposed limitations on the purchase and sales of foreign currencies. This regulation enables the country to stabilize the national economy better by controlling inward and outward flows of currency.

=== Mitigating the financial impact caused by the COVID-19 pandemic ===
In the aftermath of COVID-19 pandemic, BOM took some important measures to buffer the economic impacts to the country. Bank introduced some measures to enhance liquidity in foreign and national currency, including a credit line in the amount of US$500 million. BOM reduced the reserve ratio from 13% to 11.5% in local currency and from 36% to 34.5% in foreign currency in April 2020 as an immediate response (BOM).

=== Corporate social responsibility ===
The bank has paid more attention towards corporate social responsibility over last few years. In 2019 BOM conducted a school based project to educate children on finances, via workshops. The workshops were intended to show youth the importance of planning, saving, investing and insurance. In addition to that, theater plays on financial literacy were planned and conducted throughout the country. BOM also liaised with community radio stations to spread information on importance of saving money.

== Challenges and controversies ==
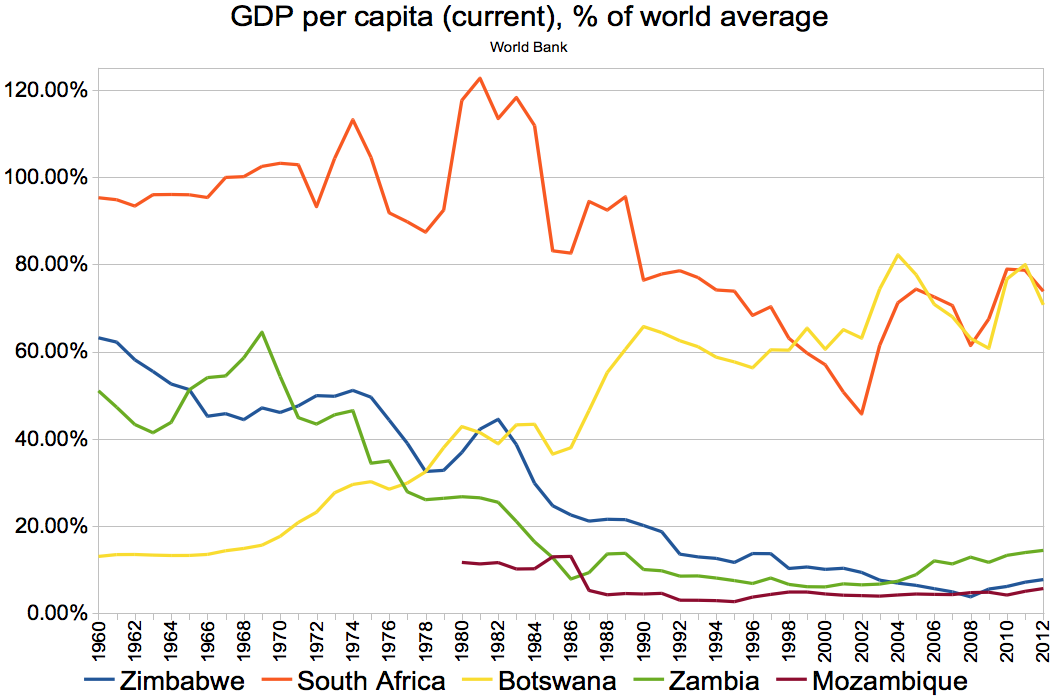
GDP per capita (current), % of world average, 1960–2012; Zimbabwe, South Africa, Botswana, Zambia, Mozambique

=== Growing inflation ===
Mozambique had reported a steep increase in inflation over the first half of last decade with 15% in 2015 and 26% by the end of 2016. It was above the government's forecast for the year of 5.1%. As a response BOM raised its key interest rate by 100 basis points to 10.75% in February 2015, in an effort to control rapidly increase inflation.

=== Corruptions ===
Over last few years controversies has emerged around the banking systems in Mozambique including widespread corruptions and related political turmoil. Combat against money laundering was one of the challenges the bank had to face. Because of that the BOM had tightened regulatory mechanisms. In 2019 the BOM launched a new banking supervision system which had resulted in initiating massive infringement proceedings against several banks of the country. Because of the looming controversies IMF has refused to grant Mozambique any new programme until further reform measures are implemented to curb corruptions.

The judicial system of Mozambique also carries a high corruption risk. Bribes and irregular payments are often exchanged in return for favorable court decisions. Public procurement is another highly vulnerable sector as companies expect favoritism by procurement officials and report that funds are often diverted to companies or individuals due to corruption. Though Mozambique has a legal anti-corruption framework in place but struggles with its effective implementation.

=== Collapse of payment system ===
There was a collapse in the payment system of government servants in Mozambique in 2018. BOM got part of the blame. Because it was a result of software provider cutting off the service because it had not been paid.

=== Economic liberalization and privatization ===
Economic liberalization and privatization in Mozambique has been subjected to many debates. Privatization in Mozambique has occurred in an unprecedented scale throughout the last decade in comparison with the rest of Africa. The role of BOM in maintaining the interests of the public and of the state has been challenged. Contrary to the public finance objectives of privatization, there are issues pertaining to subsidies to the private sector, through payment deferral and default, because they seem to be indiscriminate, unplanned and highly inefficient.

Though serious economic and political challenges were posed the privatization process is expected to accelerate during the next 5–10 years. So BOM will face more challenges.

== Governors of the Bank of Mozambique ==
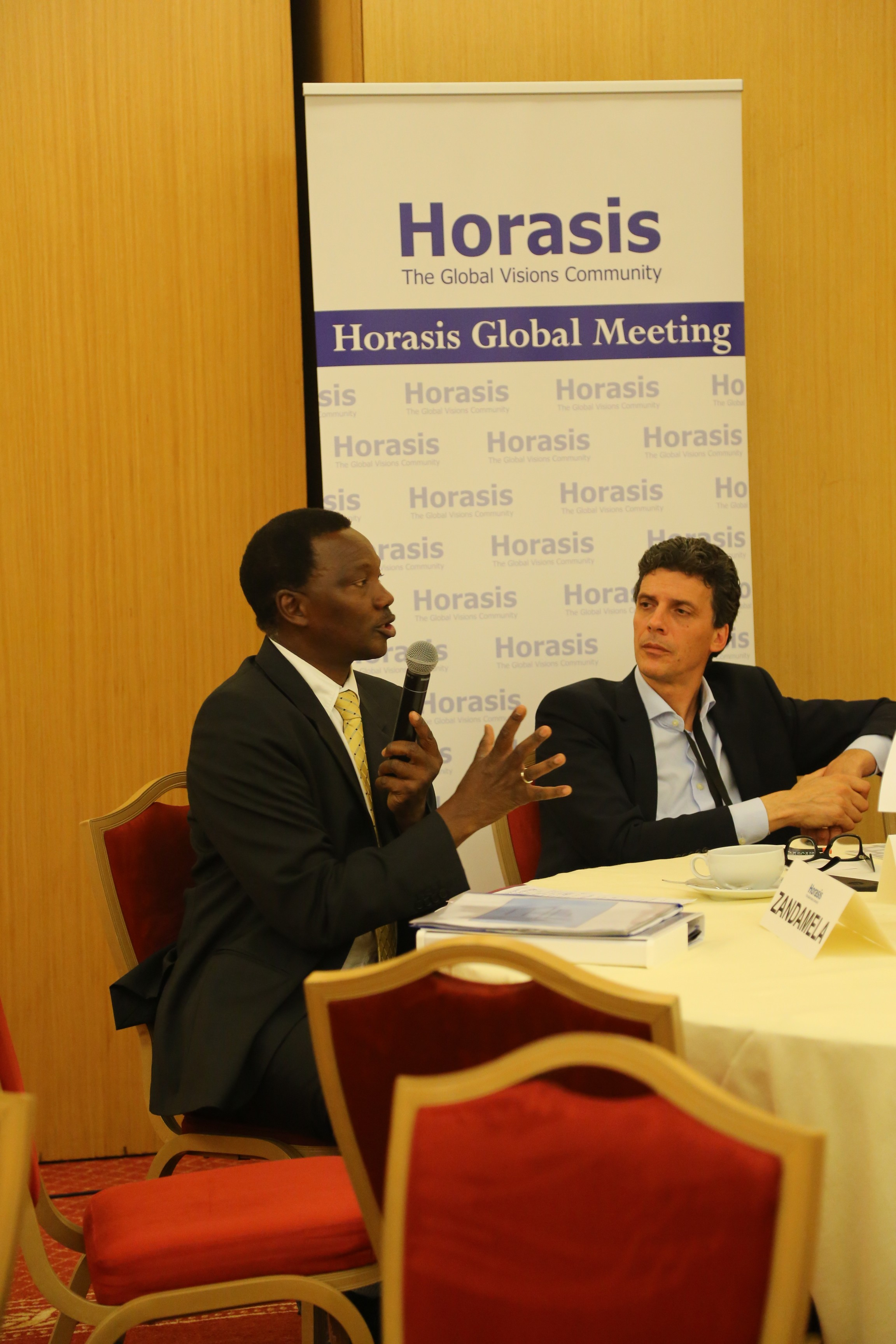
Rogério Zandamela

- 1975–1978: Alberto Cassimo
- 1978–1981: Sérgio Vieira
- 1981–1986: Prakash Ratilal
- 1986–1991: Eneas Comiche
- 1991–2006: Adriano Maleiane
- 2006–2016: Ernesto Gove
- 2016: Rogério Zandamela

== See also ==
- List of central banks and currencies of Africa
- Economy of Mozambique
- Mozambican metical
- List of central banks
- List of financial supervisory authorities by country
