= Timeline of São Tomé =

The following is a timeline of the capital city of São Tomé as well as Água Grande District (since 1975, much of the district is covered by this city) in the island of São Tomé. São Tomé and Príncipe.

== Before the 20th century ==
- Between mid January 1469 and 1471 – The northeast of the island were discovered by the explorers João de Santarém and Pêro Escobar
- 1493:
  - The first successful settlement of São Tomé was established by Álvaro Caminha
  - Torre do Capitão (Captain's Tower) built
- 1522 – The city of São Tomé becomes colonial capital of the island
- 1534 – The city of São Tomé became a bishopric through the Bull "Aequum reputamus" of Pope Paul IV, the diocese of Tomé (now São Tomé and Príncipe) was established, also the Our Lady of Grace church became a cathedral
- 1575 – Fort São Sebastião near the town of São Tomé built
- 1576–1578 – Our Lady of Grace Cathedral made renovation works
- 1595 – 9 July: Rei Amador and most of the slaves took part in the Angolar revolt, they marched into the capital and were subjugated a year later
- 1598
  - August – Governor's office taken by the Dutch
  - October – Governor's office retaken by the Portuguese
- 1709 – Colonial office taken by the French
- 1715 – Colonial office retaken by the Portuguese
- 1753 – Colonial capital of Portuguese São Tomé and Príncipe moved from São Tomé to Santo António on the island of Príncipe
- 1784 – The front part of Our Lady of Grace Cathedral in São Tomé was in ruins
- 1814 – Our Lady of Grace Cathedral was restored again at the initiative of the local population
- 1848 – Benga king Bonkoro II from the island of Corisco (today, a part of Equatorial Guinea) moved to the island and the city after rivalries with Munga I who succeeded him
- 1852 – The town of São Tomé (now city) was again colonial capital of Portuguese São Tomé and Príncipe
- 1868 – Banco Nacional Ultramarino opened its branch in the island of São Tomé, it existed until 1975
- 1885 – The early São Sebastião Lighthouse in the island of São Tomé built
- 1890: – Ilhéu das Cabras lighthouse built north of the island of São Tomé
- 1910:
  - The Chief Expedition of the German Central African Expedition stopped by the island at Sāo Tomé at its port then left for the Congo
  - The German Central African Expedition led by Schultze and Midbraed stopped by the island at São Tomé at its port, the left for Annobón and the Congo

== 20th century ==
- 1928 – 10 November: São Sebastião Lighthouse built in São Tomé at the fort
- 1931 – Andorinha Sport Club of the island of São Tomé established
- c. 1935 – São Tome Football Association (now as São Tomé and Príncipe (or Santomean) Football Federation) founded with its headquarters in the city
- 1947 – the School of Nursing (now USTP's High Institute of Sciences and Health) opens
- 1951 – The city becomes provincial capital of Portuguese São Tomé and Príncipe
- 1952
  - the School of Nursing closes
  - 21 September: Colégio-Liceu de São Tomé (São Tomé College-Lyceum) established, today it is known as Patrice Lumumba Preparatory School
- 1954 – Renovation of the Colonial Office (now the Presidential Palace)
- 1956 – Last modification of Our Lady of Grace Cathedral
- 1957 – Our Lady of Grace Cathedral becomes seat of the Diocese of São Tomé and Príncipe
- 1960 – Committee for the Liberation of São Tomé and Príncipe (now the Movement for the Liberation of São Tomé and Príncipe/Social Democratic Party), a nationalist group was established with its headquarters in the city
- 1962 – 22 November: Douglas C-54D-10-DC 7502 of the Portuguese Air Force crashed shortly after take-off for Portela Airport, Lisbon, Portugal, killing 22 of the 37 people on board.
- 1964 – 13 February: São Tomé Provincial (now Regional) Football Association founded with its headquarters in the city
- 1967 – The airport also served as the major base of operations for the Biafran airlift in Nigeria during the Nigerian Civil War
- 1969 – 6 October: Escola Técnica Silva e Cunha, today, the National Lyceum opened
- 1974 – 18 December – The city becomes seat of the autonomous province of São Tomé and Príncipe
- 1975
  - July 12 – City becomes national capital of the independent Democratic Republic of São Tomé and Príncipe
  - Colonial office becomes the nation's Presidential Palace
  - BNU branch becomes headquarters of the Central Bank of São Tomé and Príncipe
- 1976
  - São Tomé and Príncipe Red Cross founded
  - 11 July – Fortress becomes São Sebastião Museum
  - December: Vitória Riboque football (soccer) club established
- 1981 – GD Palmar football (soccer) club established in suburban Palmar
- 1982
  - 1 January: Correios de São Tomé e Príncipe opened its headquarters
  - 31 December: the Escola de Formação e Superação de Quadros Docentes (EFSQD) opens, now USTP's High Institute of Education and Communications
- 1983 – School of Training for Health Dr. Victor Sá Machado opens
- 1985 – STP-Press, a news agency opened its headquarters
- 1990 - 4 November - Headquarters of Democratic Convergence Party – Reflection Group (PCD-GR) opened
- 1993
  - 3 March: Headquarters of Banco Internacional de São Tomé e Príncipe (BISTP) opens
  - 1 October: Air São Tomé and Príncipe opened its headquarters at the airport
- 1994
  - Ana Chaves Range Real Lighthouse opened
  - 20 September: São Sebastião Lighthouse restored

== 21st century ==
- 2000 – Escola de Formação e Superação de Quadros Docentes (EFSQD) becomes Escola de Formação de Professores e Educadores, now USTP's High Institute of Education and Communications
- 2001 – Population: 49,957 (urban agglomeration).
- 2002 – May: National Library of São Tomé and Príncipe opens in the subdivision of Náutico
- 2003 – School of Training for Health Dr. Victor Sá Machado becomes Victor Sá Machado Institute of Health Sciences (now the USTP's High Institute of Sciences and Health)
- 2006 – 23 May: A HC-6 Twin Otter Series 300 of Air São Tomé and Príncipe crashed into Ana Chaves Bay in the north east of São Tomé Island during a training flight. There were four fatalities, and the aircraft was damaged beyond repair, also its airline company ceased and was later dissolved.
- 2007
  - High Institute of Sciences and Health opens, now part of USTP
  - A species of rock snails Muricopsis hernandezi described
- 2008 – STP Airways opened its headquarters at the airport and the city center
- 2014
  - STP held its 1st edition in the city
  - University of São Tomé and Príncipe opens with its main campus in the city
  - May: Africa's Connection STP opened its headquarters in the city
