= List of companies of São Tomé and Príncipe =

Location of São Tomé and Príncipe

São Tomé and Príncipe is a Portuguese-speaking island nation in the Gulf of Guinea, off the western equatorial coast of Central Africa. It consists of two archipelagos around the two main islands: São Tomé and Príncipe, located about 140 kilometres (87 miles) apart and about 250 and 225 kilometres (155 and 140 miles), respectively, off the northwestern coast of Gabon.

Since the 19th century, the economy of São Tomé and Príncipe has been based on plantation agriculture. At the time of independence, Portuguese-owned plantations occupied 90% of the cultivated area. After independence, control of these plantations passed to various state-owned agricultural enterprises. The main crop on São Tomé is cocoa, representing about 95% of agricultural exports. Other export crops include copra, palm kernels, and coffee.

== Notable firms ==
This list includes notable companies with primary headquarters located in the country. The industry and sector follow the Industry Classification Benchmark taxonomy. Organizations which have ceased operations are included and noted as defunct.

Notable companies Status: P=Private, S=State; A=Active, D=Defunct
Name	Industry	Sector	Headquarters	Founded	Notes	Status	
Africa's Connection STP	Consumer services	Airlines	São Tomé	2014	Regional and charter airline	P	A
Air São Tomé and Príncipe	Consumer services	Airlines	São Tomé	1993	Airline, defunct in 2006	P	D
Central Bank of São Tomé and Príncipe	Financials	Banks	São Tomé	1975	Central bank	S	A
Correios de São Tomé e Príncipe	Industrials	Delivery services	São Tomé	1982	Postal services	S	A
STP Airways	Consumer services	Airlines	São Tomé	2008	National airline	P	A

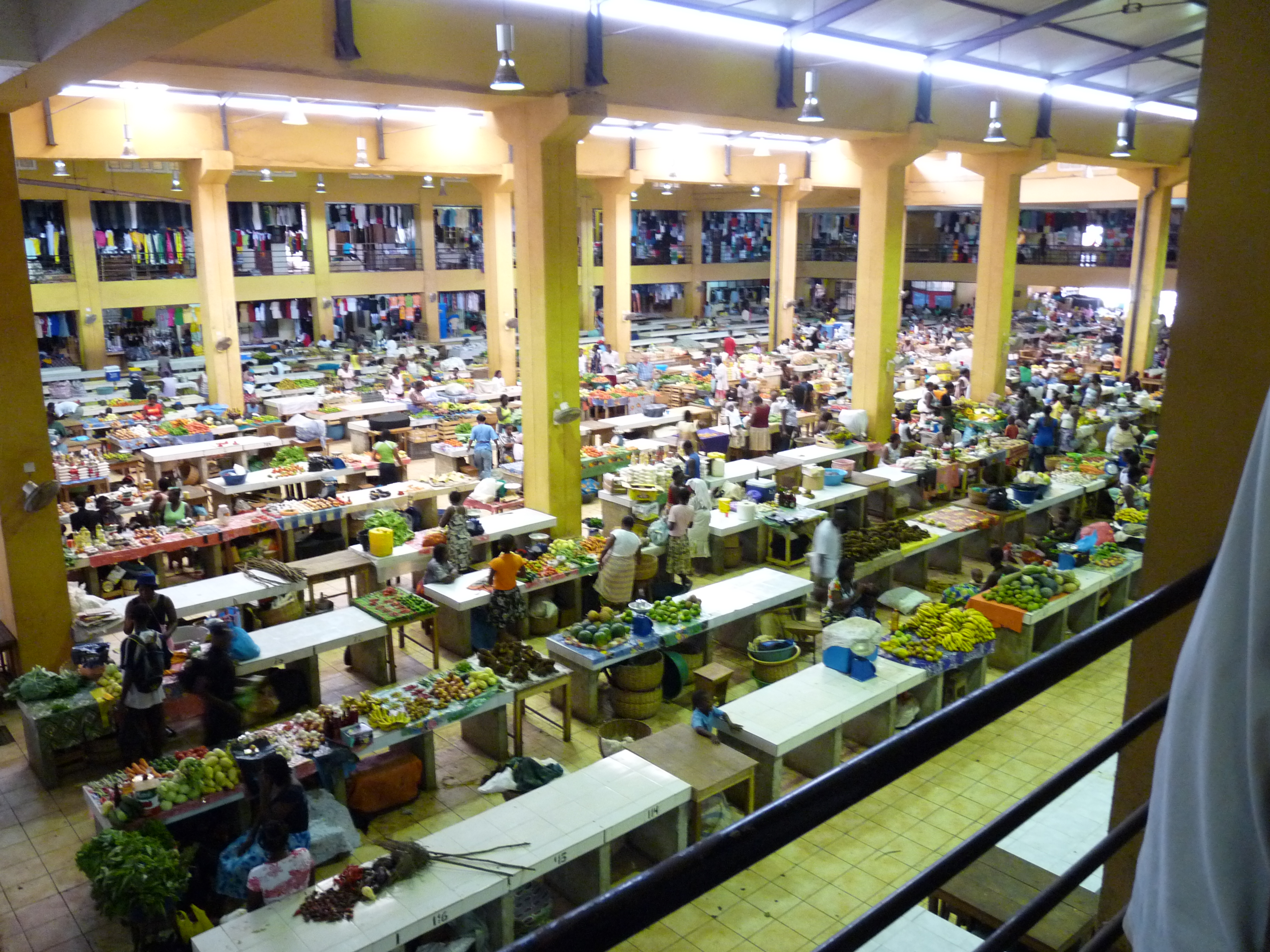
A market place located in the city of São Tomé.

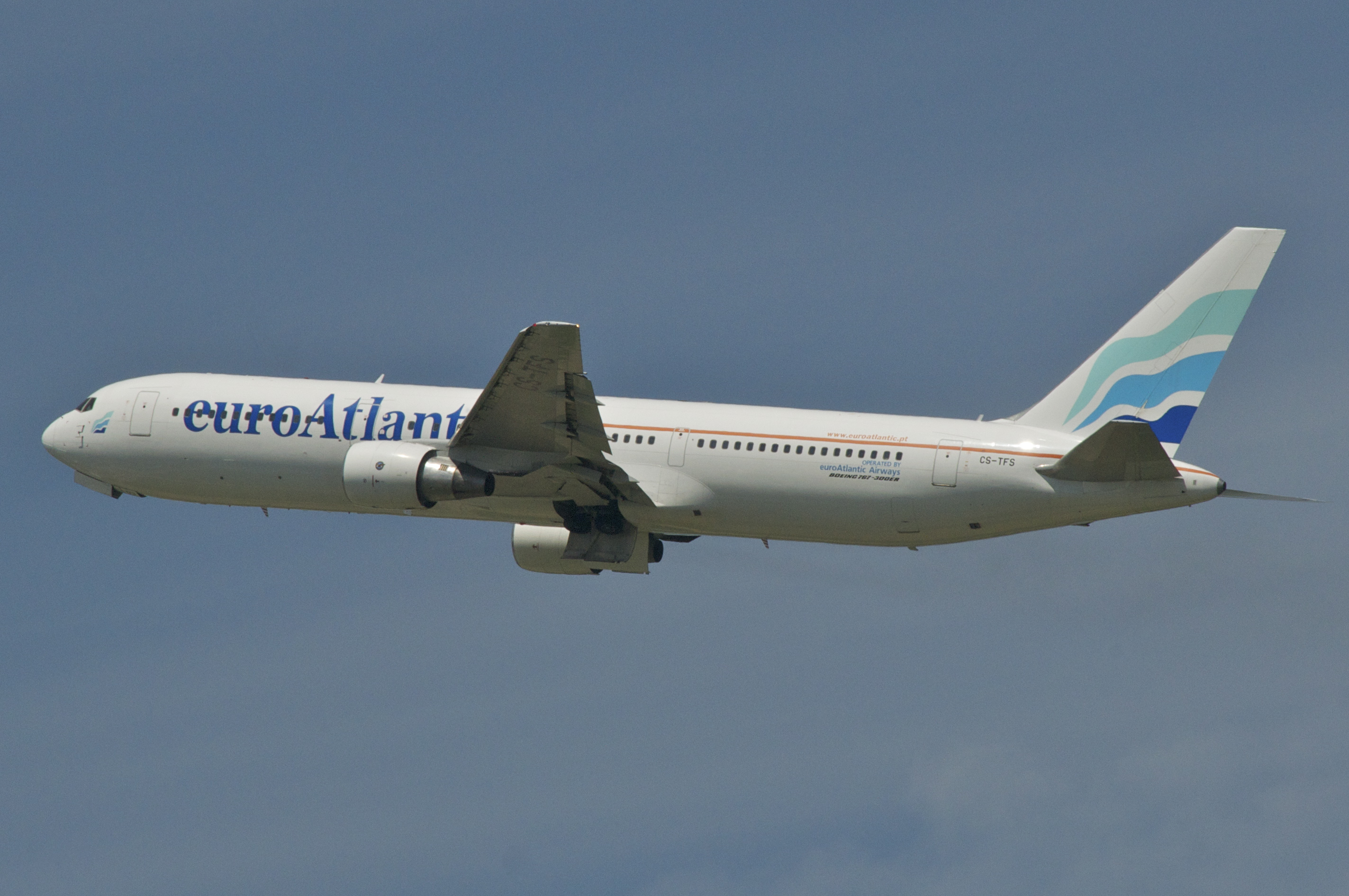
A Boeing 767-300ER operated for STP Airways at Zurich International Airport

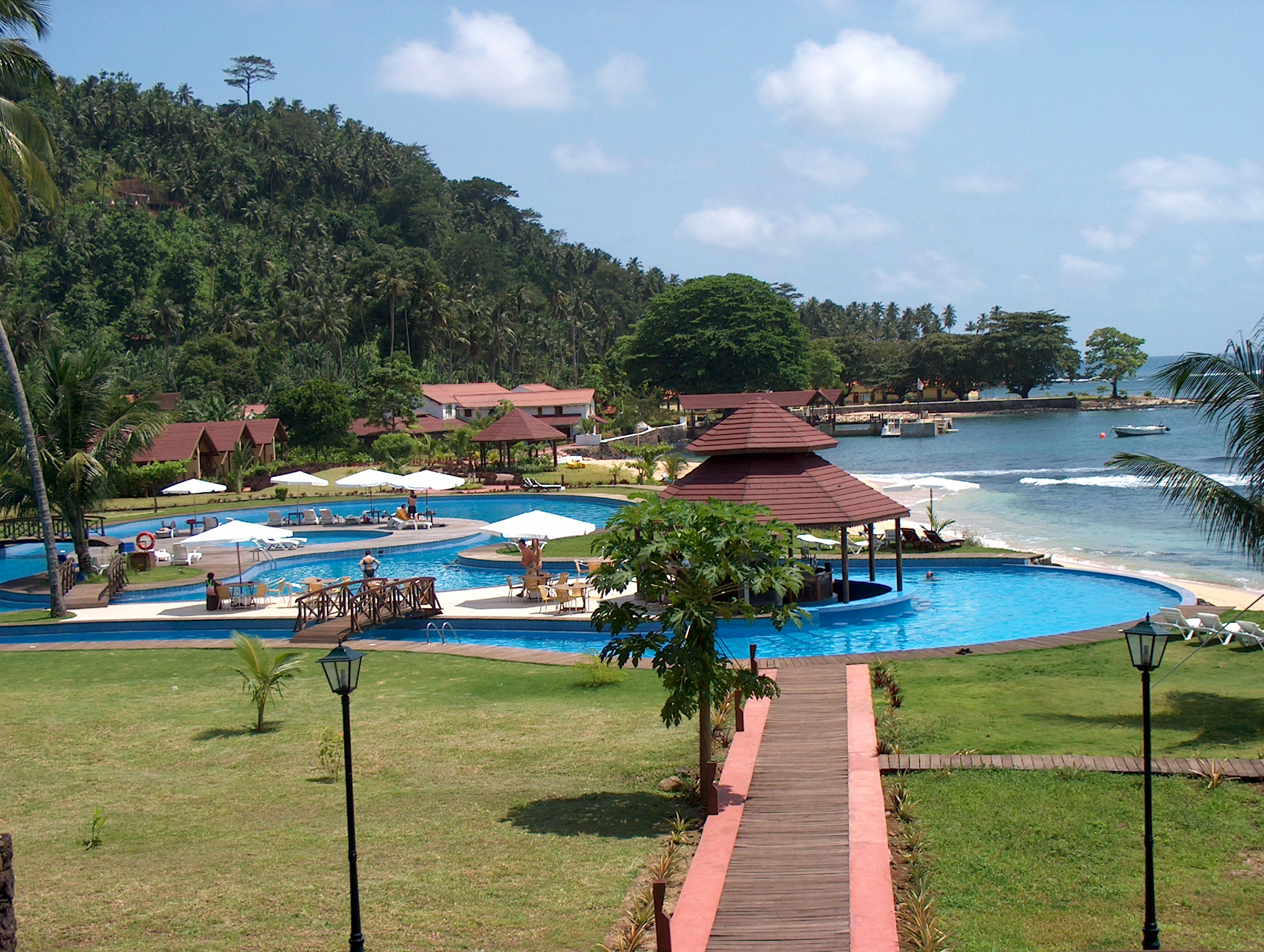
Tourist resort in Ilhéu das Rolas.

== See also ==
- List of airlines of São Tomé and Príncipe
- List of banks in São Tomé and Príncipe
