= Transport in São Tomé and Príncipe =

Transport in São Tomé and Príncipe relies primarily on road infrastructure for local needs and airports and sea travel for international needs. São Tomé and Príncipe does not have railways.

== Seaports ==
In 1999 the country's merchant marine fleet included 9 ships (1,000 GT or over) totaling 43,587 GT/34,802 tonnes deadweight (DWT)—four cargo ships, one container ship, one refrigerated cargo ship and three roll-on/roll-off ships.

On São Tomé Island, there are seaports in São Tomé by Ana Chaves Bay, another in Neves, which is not only fishing but a fuel port which was constructed in 2012 and near Porto Alegre, which is the only two ferry ports. On Príncipe, there is a seaport in Santo António. There is the tiny ferry port at Ilhéu das Rolas, which is the only port of any size founded outside the two main islands.

== Air services ==
São Tomé and Príncipe are served by two airports, for São Tomé (and its surrounding islets), it is the São Tomé International Airport. There are two paved runways in total: one in the 1,524 to 2,437 m range and the other in the 914 to 1,523 m range. For Príncipe, it is the Príncipe Airport which has recently been paved during its modernisation which began in 2012 and finished in October 2015. The paved runway is 1,750 m.

São Tomé's airport is the only international airport which offers flights to parts of Africa, mainly the west and the central portions. Airline companies includes STP Airways, the national airline and Africa's Connection STP, the latter operates STP Airways.

== Road networks ==
As for 2006, there were 320 kilometers (200 mi) highways in São Tomé and Príncipe, 218 km (135 mi) paved roads and 102 km (63 mi) unpaved roads.

The nation has the highway network (commonly as routes), it consists of three primary highways, the EN1 (São Tomé-Guadalupe-Neves), the EN2 (São Tomé-Santana-São João dos Angolares-Porto Alegre) and the EN3 (São Tomé-Monte Café). It also has secondary roads, some of them area the ES1, ES2 and the ES3. Príncipe has no route numbers.

== Bus services ==
Its bus services are served with minibuses, as to that part of Africa, it is dominant.
