= EJZ =

EJZ may refer to:

- EJZ Bridge over Shoshone River, a bridge in Wyoming, United States
- Executive Jet Services (ICAO code EJZ), a defunct airline of São Tomé and Príncipe
- EJZ, a former name of American radio station WEJZ
