= List of airlines of São Tomé and Príncipe =

This is a list of airlines currently operating in São Tomé and Príncipe. All airlines are currently banned in the EU.

Airline	Image	IATA	ICAO	Callsign	Commenced operations	Notes
STP Airways		8F	STP	SAOTOME AIRWAYS	2008	

== See also ==
- List of airlines
- List of air carriers banned in the European Union
- List of defunct Airlines of Sao Tome and Principe
