= EuroAtlantic Airways =

Portuguese airline

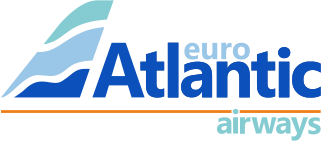

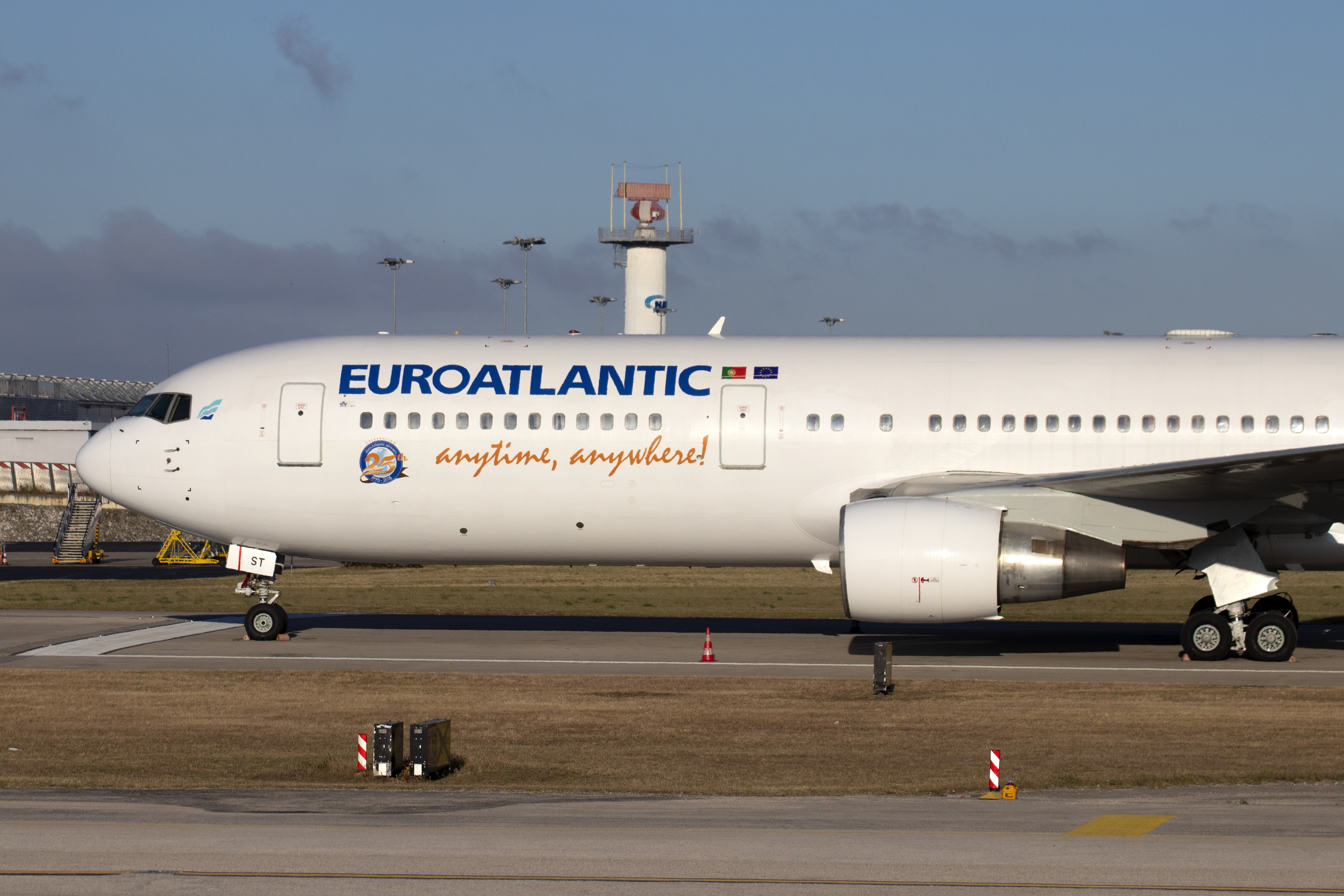
IATA	ICAO	Call sign
YU	MMZ	EUROATLANTIC
- Founded: 25 August 1993; 33 years ago
- Operating bases: Lisbon Airport
- Subsidiaries: STP Airways (38%)
- Fleet size: 6
- Destinations: 2 (scheduled)
- Headquarters: Carnaxide, Portugal
- Website: www.euroatlantic.pt

EuroAtlantic Airways (legally EuroAtlantic Airways – Transportes Aéreos S.A.) is a Portuguese scheduled and Charter ACMI airline specialized in leasing and air charter headquartered in Carnaxide and based at Lisbon Airport.

== History ==
Founded as Air Zarco on 25 August 1993 by Tomaz Metello, the company adopted the trade name Air Madeira until 17 May 2000, when the memorandum of association was altered by deed, and the name of EuroAtlantic Airways – Transportes Aéreos S.A. was adopted. EuroAtlantic also took over the corporate design from Air Zarco which is still used today. The airline was founded by Portuguese businessman Tomaz Metello, who was the owner of the airline until 2019. It was sold to the Luxembourg group Imperial Jet, led by German-Lebanese pilot and businessman Abed El-Jaouni. EuroAtlantic also owns 38% of the national airline of São Tomé and Príncipe, STP Airways.

EuroAtlantic operated a direct flight from Lisbon to Dili's Presidente Nicolau Lobato International Airport in East Timor in January 2008 using a Boeing 757-200 carrying 140 members of the Portuguese National Guard. It was the first aircraft larger than a Boeing 737 to ever land at the airport.

EuroAtlantic was known for operating the last Lockheed L-1011 TriStar in passenger service in Europe. It was phased out in March 2010 and is since stored at Amman Civil Airport

== Destinations ==
=== Charter and ACMI operations ===
EuroAtlantic Airways operates worldwide charter services as well as ACMI and other wet lease operations, mostly on behalf of other airlines. For example, EuroAtlantic operated two Boeing 777s on behalf of Biman Bangladesh Airlines in 2009 and two Boeing 767s for Air Canada in 2014. Among their usual customers are TAP Air Portugal, LOT Polish Airlines, FlyNAS (for Hajj flights), TACV Cabo Verde Airlines, and TUI fly Belgium. The company slogan is Anytime, Anywhere!

=== Scheduled operations ===
As of November 2025, EuroAtlantic Airways is operating routes on behalf of Azul Brazilian Airlines.

The aircraft with registration CS-TSW operated flights for LOT Polish Airlines on the route between Warsaw Chopin Airport and John F. Kennedy International Airport under flight numbers LO26 and LO27 until the end of September 2025.

From 1 June 2026, one of the Boeing 777-200 aircraft will operate the connection between Warsaw Chopin Airport and Toronto Pearson International Airport. The aircraft will perform the LO45 and LO46 rotation six times a week.

Another aircraft under the registration CS-TSU is operating on Azul Brazilian Airlines behalf between Orlando International Airport and Belo Horizonte International Airport under the flight numbers AD8730 and AD8731.

== Fleet ==
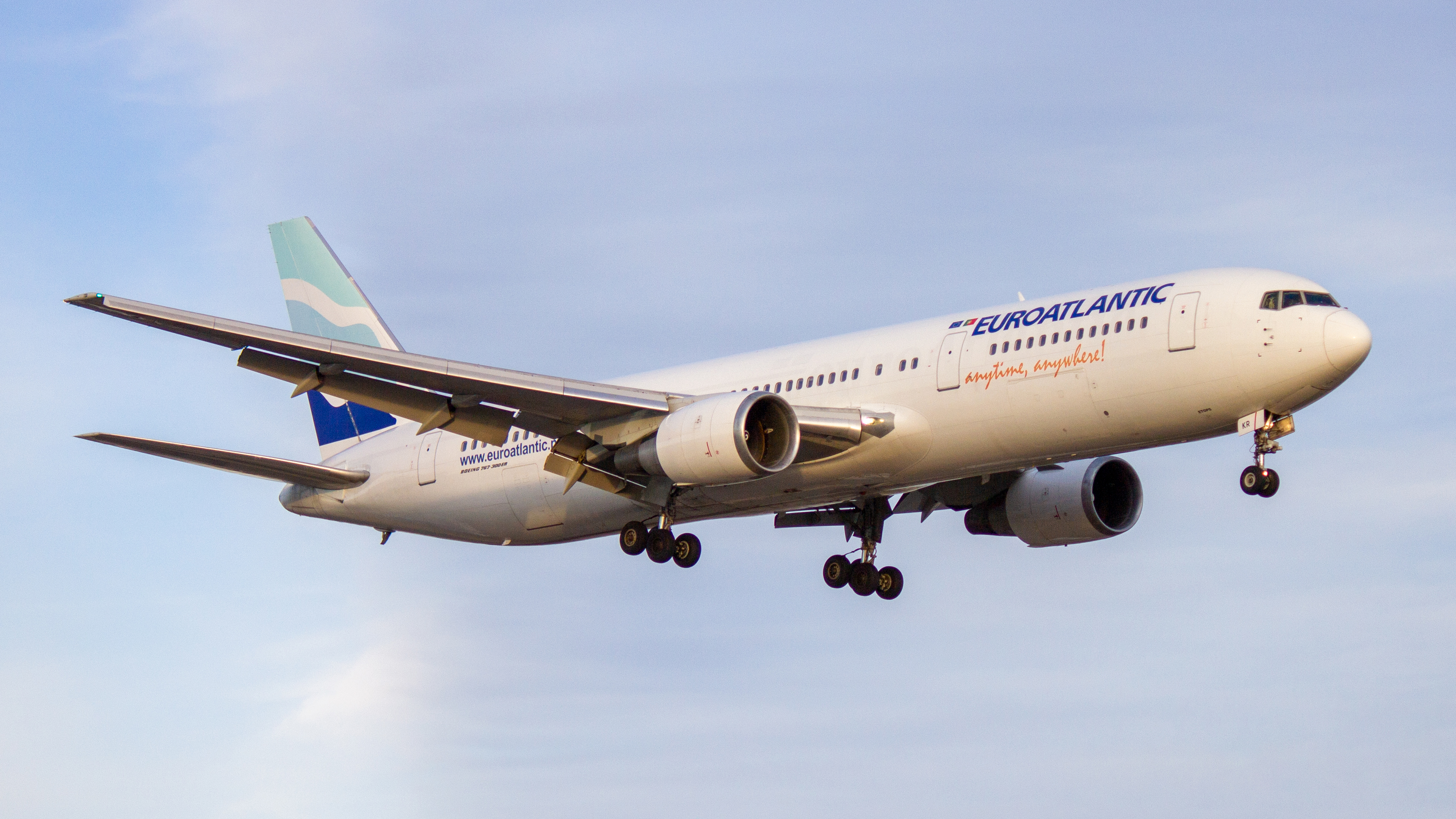
EuroAtlantic Boeing 767-300ER

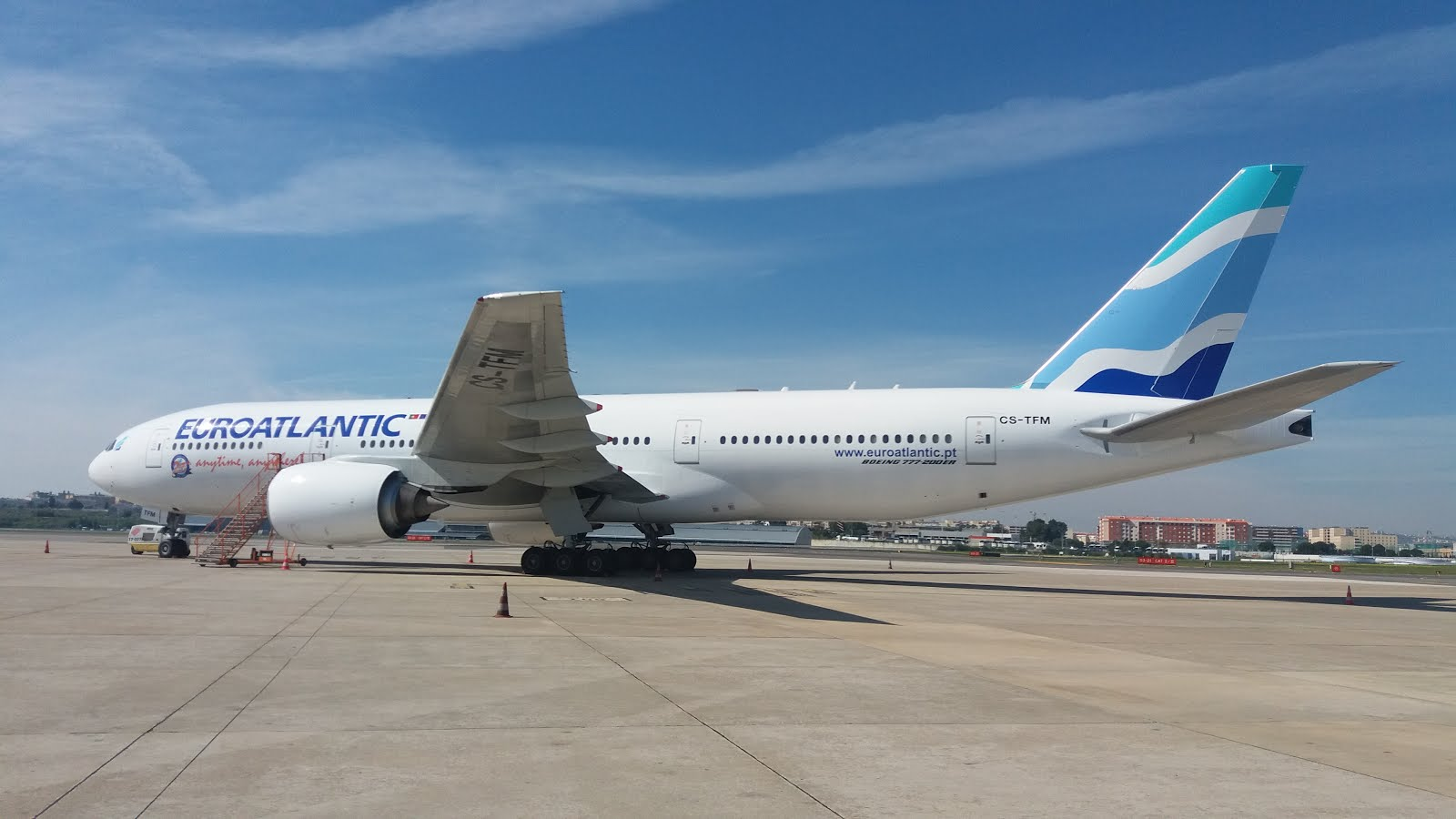
EuroAtlantic Boeing 777-200ER

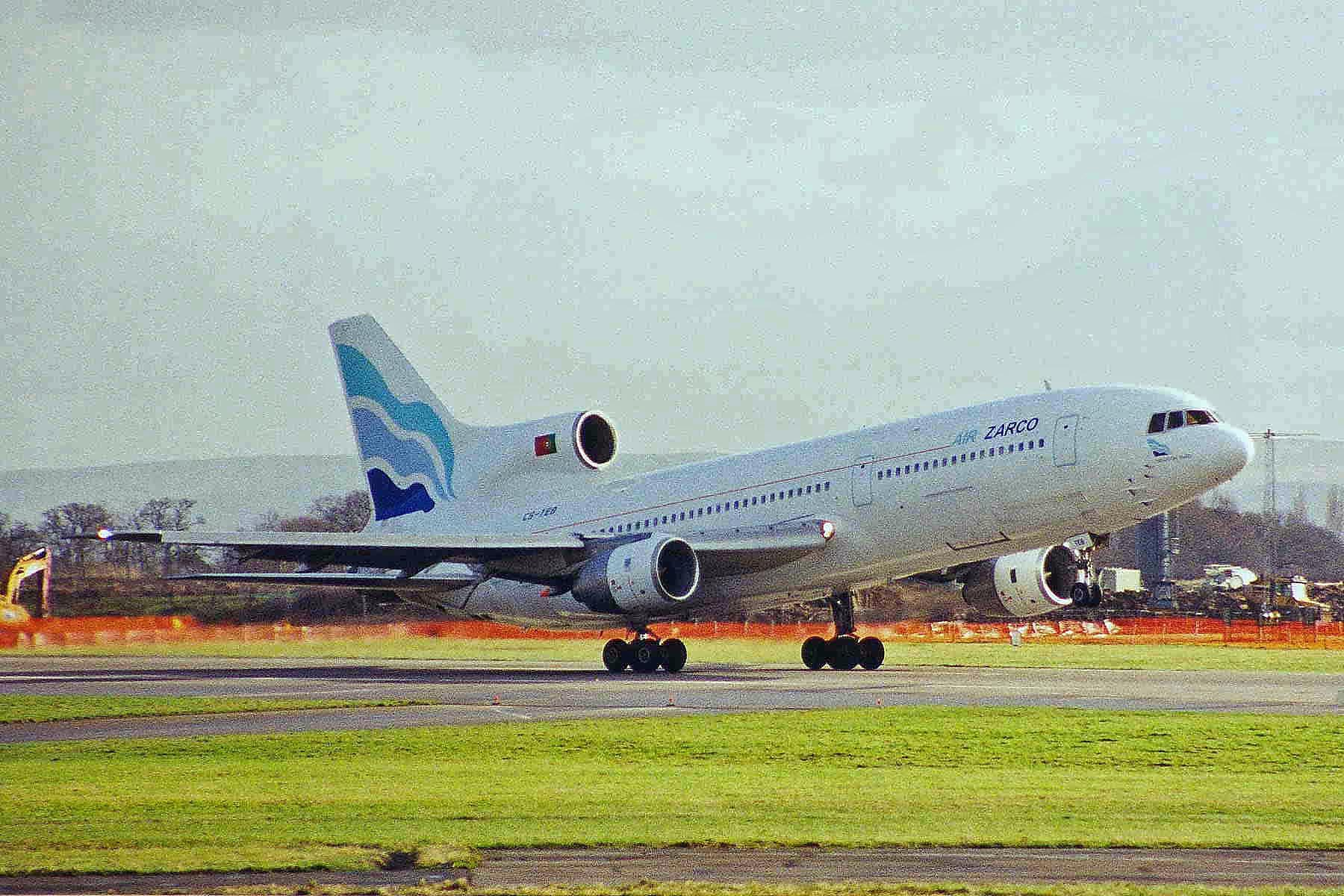
A former EuroAtlantic Lockheed L-1011 branded as Air Zarco in 2000.

=== Current fleet ===
As of September 2025, EuroAtlantic Airways operates the following aircraft:

Aircraft	Reg	In service	Orders	CONF 1			CONF 2		Notes
Aircraft	Reg	In service	Orders	C	W	Y	C	Y	Notes
Boeing 767-300ER	CS-TST	3	—	—	—	—	—	309	
Boeing 767-300ER	CS-TSU	3	—	16	—	251	—	—	
Boeing 767-300ER	CS-TSV	3	—	34	—	199	—	308	
Boeing 777-200ER	CS-TSX	2	—	30	24	239	—	—	
Boeing 777-200ER	CS-TSW	2	—	30	24	239	—	—	
Airbus A330-200	CS-TGD	1	—	12	—	283	—	—	
Airbus A330-300	CS-TGI	1	—	—	—	—	—	—	
Total		7	—						

=== Former fleet ===
EuroAtlantic Airways has previously operated the following aircraft:

Aircraft	Total	Introduced	Retired	Notes
Boeing 777-200ER	1	2019	2024	
Boeing 737-800	1	2020	2020	
Cessna Citation CJ3	1	2015	2018	Exclusive flights only
Boeing 767-300ER/BDSF	1	2008	2017	Launch customer
Boeing 767-200ER	1	2014	2014	leased from Jet Asia Airways
Boeing 757-200	2	2007	2011	
Lockheed L-1011-500	1	2000	2010	
Boeing 737-300	3	2000	2006	
