= List of defunct airlines of São Tomé and Príncipe =

This is a list of defunct airlines of São Tomé and Príncipe.

Airline	Image	IATA	ICAO	Callsign	Commenced operations	Ceased operations	Notes
Aero Trans Service					2005	2007	
Air Luxor		C2	ALU	LUXORJET	2002	2006	Operated Airbus A320-200
Air São Tomé and Príncipe		KY	EQL		1995	2006	
Equatorial International Airlines		GJ	EQL		1986	1993	Succeeded by Air São Tomé and Príncipe
Executive Jet Services			EJZ		2006	2014	AOC revoked
Express International Cargo			EIC	EXCARGO	2000	2000	Operated Ilyushin Il-76
Líneas Aéreas Santomenses			SMS		2004	2006	
LASTP		OT			1949	1985	renamed/merged to: Equatorial
Linhas Aéreas de Sao Tomé e Principe		GJ;KY	EQL		1993	1995	Rebranded as Air São Tomé and Príncipe
Transliz Aviation			TLZ		2007	2014	

== See also ==
- List of airlines of São Tomé and Príncipe
- List of airports in São Tomé and Príncipe
