= List of ports in São Tomé and Príncipe =

This is a list of ports and harbours in São Tomé and Príncipe.

== Major and minor ports ==
=== Príncipe and the surrounding islets ===
- Port of Santo António - the island's chief port, small pier

=== São Tomé and the surrounding islets ===
- Ana Chaves Bay (São Tomé), the country's major port, quays
- Neves, oil terminal
- Fernão Dias, small concrete pier
