= São Sebastião Lighthouse =

São Sebastião Lighthouse Farol de São Sebastião
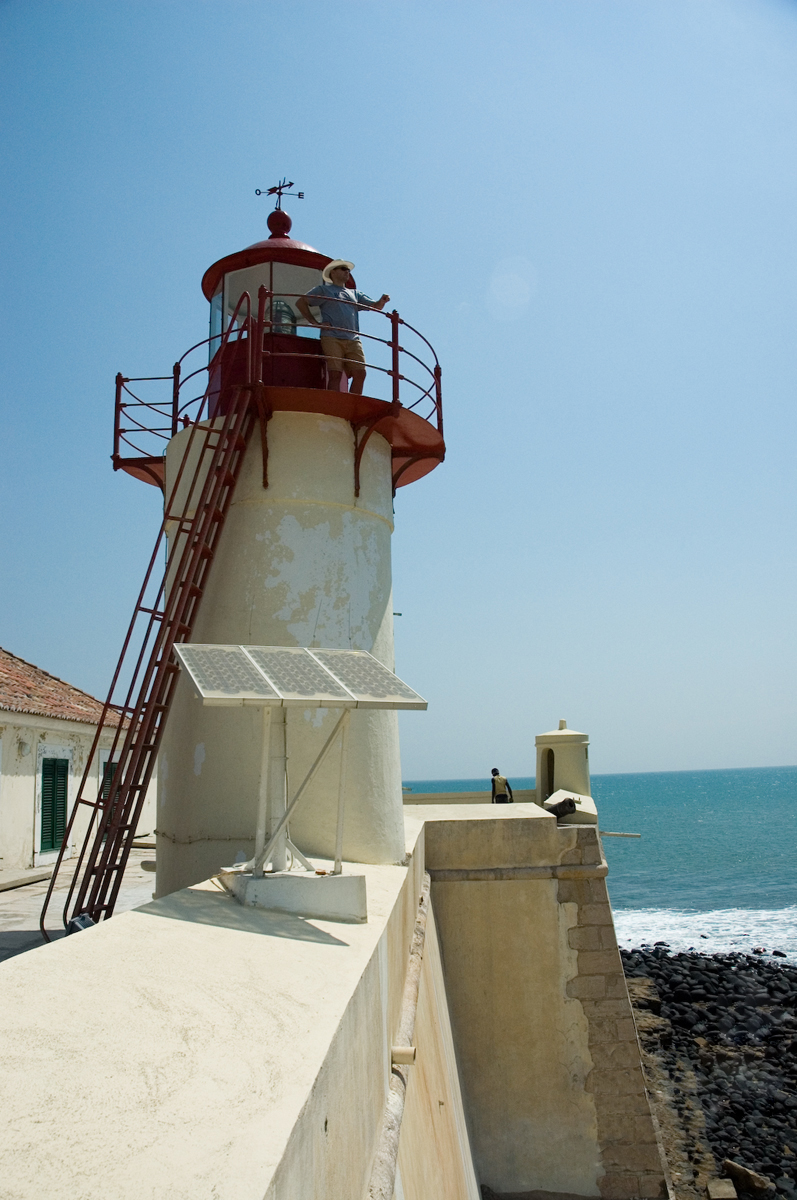
- Location: São Tomé, São Tomé and Príncipe
- Coordinates: 0.3460°N 6.7395°E

Tower
- Constructed: 1928
- Height: 6 metres (20 ft)
- Shape: round tower
- Heritage: Heritage of Portuguese Influence

Light
- Focal height: 14 metres (46 ft)
- Range: 9 nautical miles (17 km; 10 mi)
- Characteristic: Fl(4) WR 12s

São Sebastião Lighthouse (Portuguese: Farol de São Sebastião) is a lighthouse in the São Sebastião fortress at the southeastern end of Ana Chaves Bay in São Tomé, capital of São Tomé and Príncipe. The lighthouse is a 6 metres high white round tower with a red lantern. It was built in 1928. Its focal height is 14 metres.

== See also ==
- List of lighthouses in São Tomé and Príncipe
