= São Sebastião Museum =

Coordinates: 0°20′45″N 6°44′22″E

São Sebastião Museum Museu São Sebastião
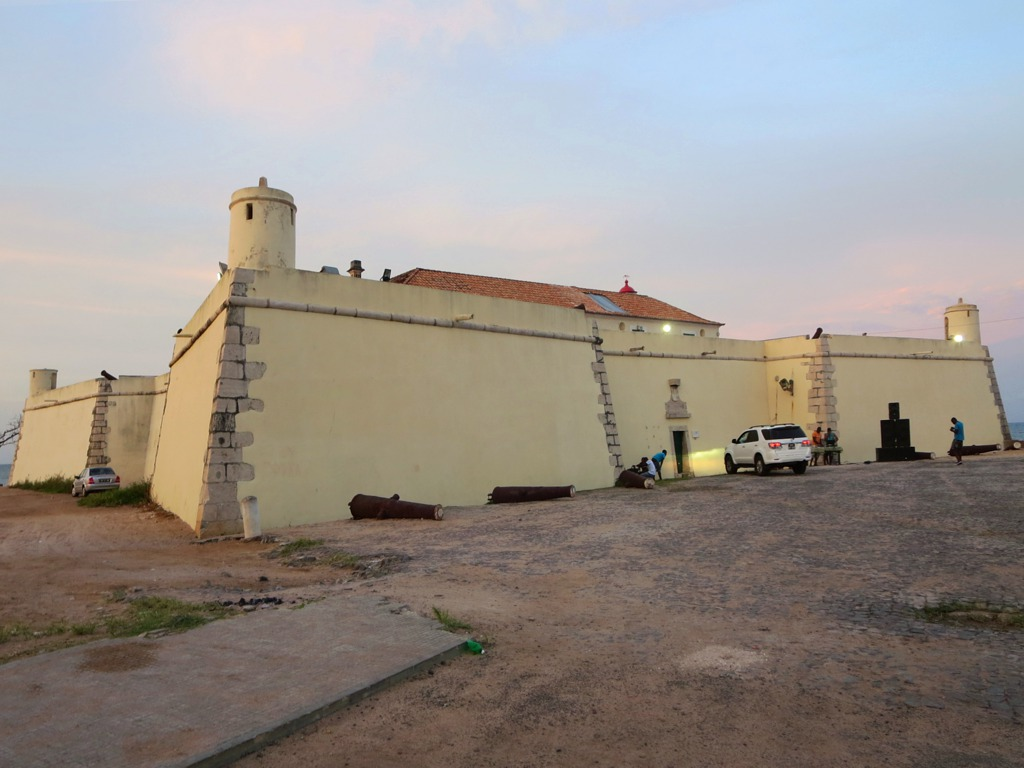
- Forte de São Sebastião

- Location within São Tomé
- Established: 1566 (fortress) late 1970s (museum)
- Location: São Tomé, São Tomé Island, São Tomé and Príncipe
- Type: National Museum
- Collections: culture, local, artistry

São Sebastião Museum is a museum, housed in a 16th-century fortress in the city of São Tomé, São Tomé and Príncipe. It lies in the northeastern part of the city centre, at the southeastern end of Ana Chaves Bay. It contains religious art and colonial-era artifacts. The fortress was built in 1566 by the Portuguese in order to protect the port and city of São Tomé against pirate attacks. A lighthouse was established in the fortress in 1866; it was rebuilt in 1928. The fortress was restored at the end of the 1950s.

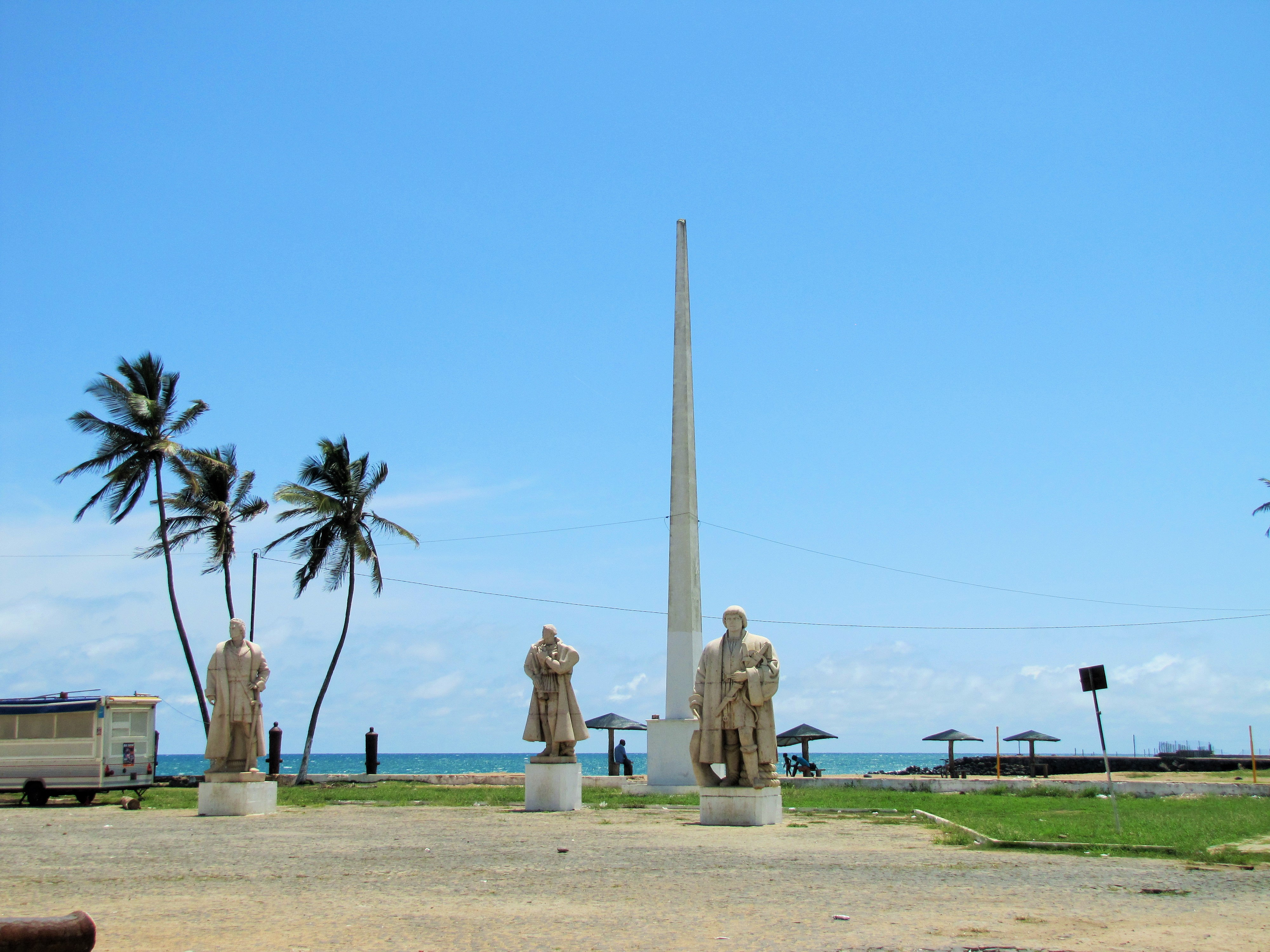
Three of the explorer's statues in front of the museum

== See also ==
- Santo António da Ponta da Mina Fortress, located on the island of Príncipe near the island capital Santo António
- List of buildings and structures in São Tomé and Príncipe
