= List of banks in São Tomé and Príncipe =

This is a list of commercial banks in São Tomé and Príncipe, based on availability of SWIFT codes by late 2024.

== List of commercial banks ==
- Afriland First Bank Sao Tome e Principe, part of Afriland First Bank Group
- Banco Internacional de São Tomé e Príncipe, part of CGD Group
- BGFIBank Sao Tome e Principe SA, part of BGFIBank Group
- Ecobank Sao Tome e Principe, part of Ecobank Group
- Energy Bank Sao Tome and Principe, part of Global Fleet Group

== See also ==
- Central Bank of São Tomé and Príncipe
- Economy of São Tomé and Príncipe
- List of banks in Africa
