= Correios de São Tomé e Príncipe =

Company responsible for postal service in São Tomé and Príncipe

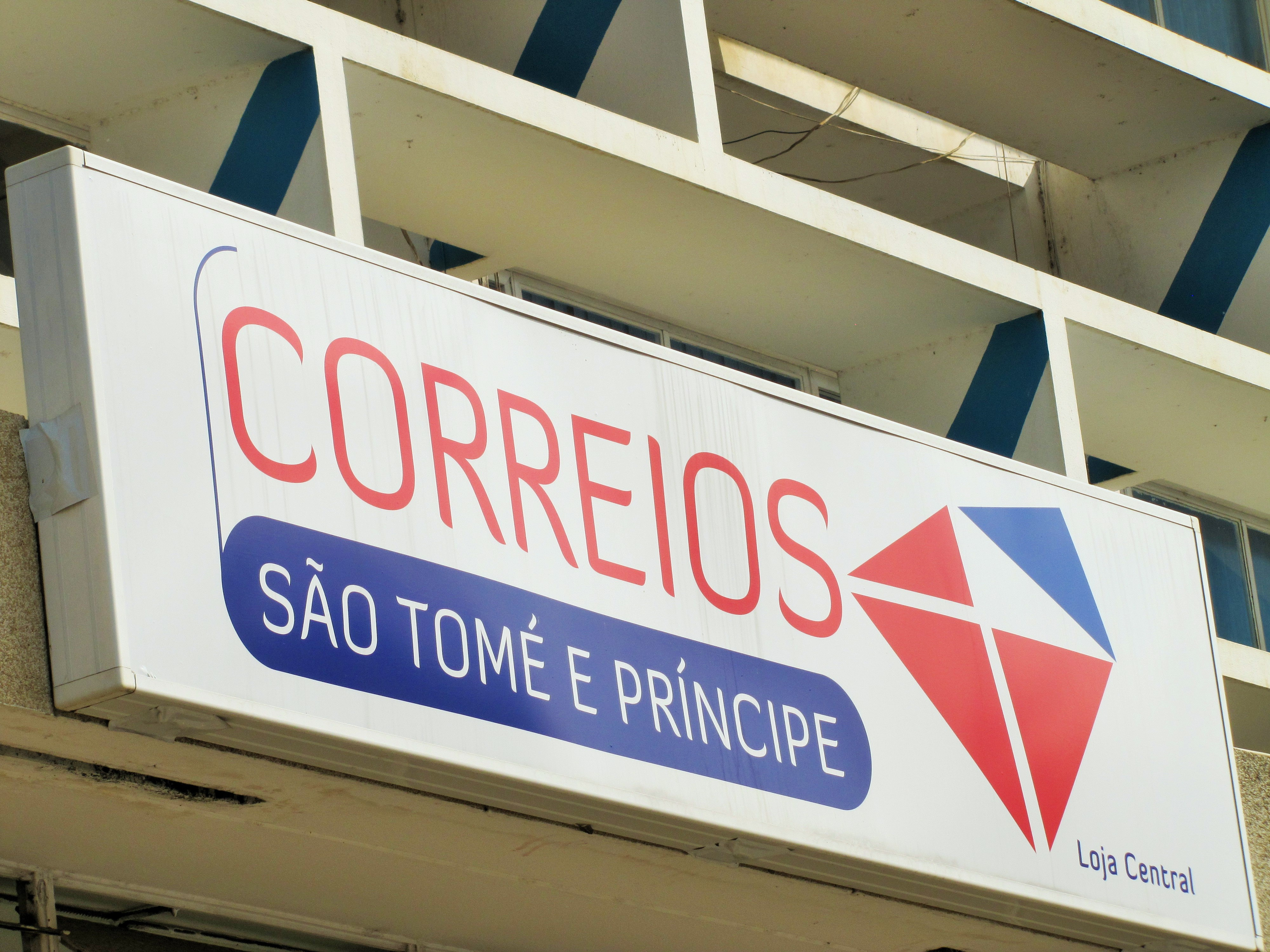
- Correios de São Tomé e Príncipe headquarters
- Company type: State-owned enterprise
- Industry: Postal services
- Founded: 1 January 1982
- Headquarters: Avenida Marginal 12 de Julho, C.P. (P.O. Box) 173; São Tomé, São Tomé Island, São Tomé and Príncipe
- Key people: Lúcio Costa, postmaster
- Products: Mail Services
- Website: web.archive.org/web/20090428210548/http://www.inh.st/correios.st.htm

Correios de São Tomé e Príncipe (Portuguese pronunciation: [kuˈʁɐjuʒ ðɨ sɐ̃w tuˈmɛ i ˈpɾĩsɨpɨ], lit. 'Post of São Tomé e Príncipe') is a state-owned company responsible for postal services in São Tomé and Príncipe. It is regulated by AGER (the General Regulation Authority (Autoridade Geral de Regulaçāo)

Its buildings are at Avenida Marginal 12 de Julho, the most famous street and arterial in the nation.

São Tomé and Príncipe are one of the countries without a postal code system.

== Logo ==
Its logo are coloured red, white and blue. "Correios" is in red. It also has a red envelope with a blue enclosure on top.

== History ==
After independence, formal postal services existed on the island as early as 1972. São Tomé and Príncipe entered the Universal Postal Union in 1977. and the company was created on 1 January 1982 to meet the resulting obligations related to postal services.

== See also ==
- List of members of the Universal Postal Union
