= Air São Tomé and Príncipe =

| IATA | ICAO | Call sign |
|---|---|---|
| KY | EQL | EQUATORIAL |
- Founded: 1993
- Ceased operations: May 23, 2006
- Hubs: São Tomé International Airport
- Focus cities: Príncipe Airport
- Fleet size: 0
- Destinations: 3
- Parent company: N/A
- Headquarters: São Tomé
- Key people: Mr RV Braganco (Ravi Vagner)(Chairperson), Felisberto Neto (President)
- Website: https://web.archive.org/*/http://airsaotomeprincipe.com

Air São Tomé and Príncipe (Linhas Aéreas de São Tomé e Príncipe, Lda) was an airline based in São Tomé, São Tomé and Príncipe. It operated scheduled services within the islands and to neighbouring Gabon. Its main base was São Tomé International Airport. It lost its only aircraft in an accident in 2006.

== History ==
Air São Tomé was founded in 1993 to replace Equatorial International Airlines. The company was owned by TAP Portugal (40%), government of São Tomé and Príncipe (35%) and Mistral Voyages (1%).

== Services ==
Air São Tomé and Príncipe operated the following services (at January 2005):

- Domestic scheduled destinations: Príncipe and São Tomé.
- International scheduled destinations: Libreville.

== Incidents and accidents ==
- On 23 May 2006, Air São Tomé and Príncipe's only aircraft, a DHC-6 Twin Otter Series 300, crashed in Ana Chaves Bay in the north east of São Tomé Island during a training flight. There were four fatalities, and the aircraft was damaged beyond repair.

== Fleet ==
Air São Tomé and Príncipe operated:

- 1 DHC-6 Twin Otter Series 300 registration S9-BAL, offered by TAP Portugal, and crashed during 2006.
