= Africa's Connection STP =

São Toméan airline

IATA	ICAO	Call sign
ACS	STP	—
- Hubs: São Tomé International Airport
- Fleet size: 3
- Destinations: 6
- Headquarters: São Tomé, São Tomé and Príncipe
- Website: http://www.africas-connection.com/

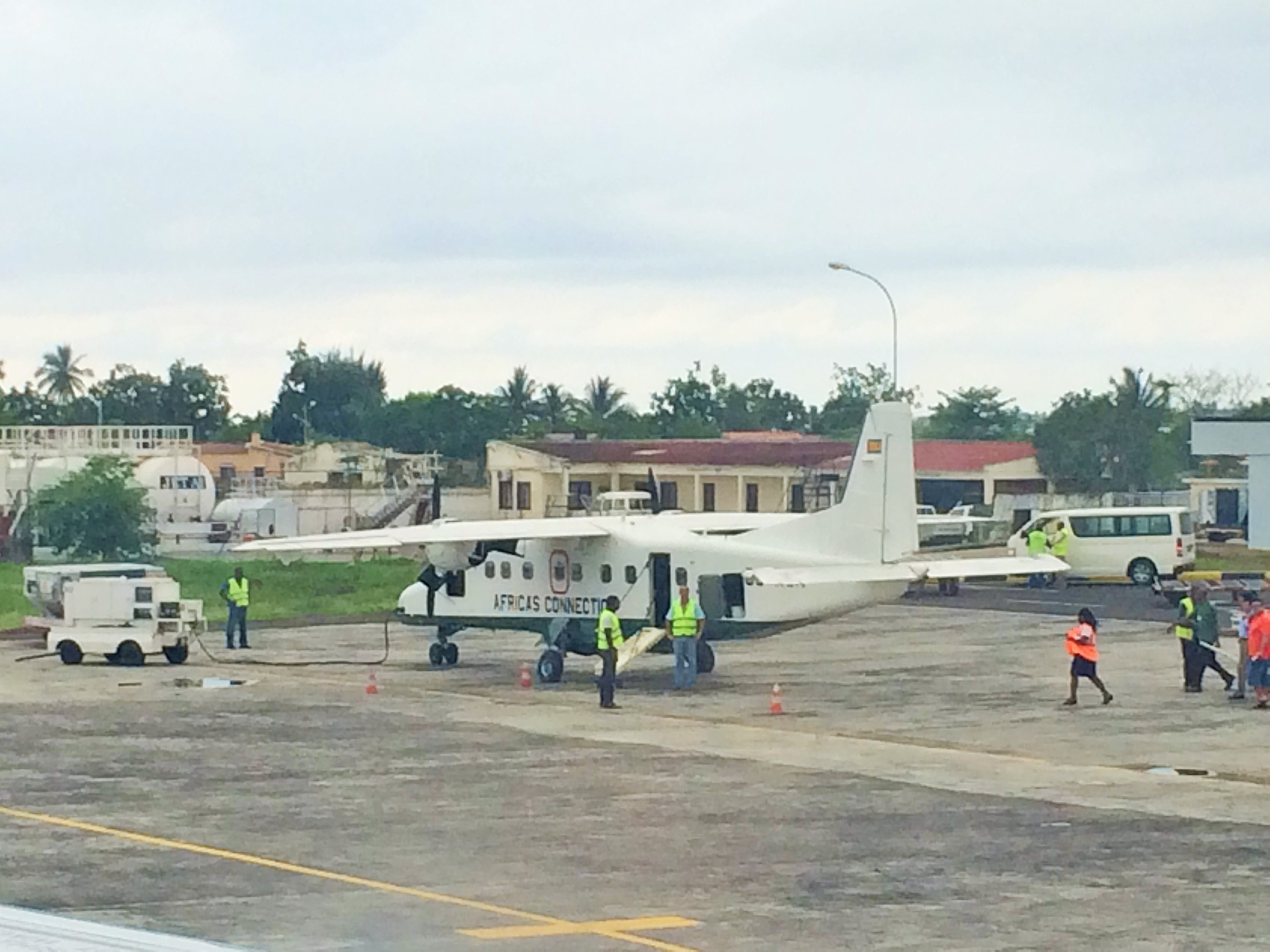
Sao Tome Airport Africa's Connection

Africa's Connection STP is an airline based in São Tomé. In 2014 it operated scheduled and charter services to Central and West Africa. According to the airline's webpage it operated 3 Dornier 228 Aircraft.

== Destinations ==
As of May 2014 the airline had 6 destinations.

Hub
Future
Terminated destination

City	Country	IATA	ICAO	Airport	Refs
Douala	Cameroon	DLA	FKKD	Douala Airport	
Libreville	Gabon	LBV	FOOL	Libreville International Airport	
Malabo	Equatorial Guinea	SSG	FGSL	Malabo International Airport	
Port Harcourt	Nigeria	PHC	DNPO	Port Harcourt International Airport	
Príncipe	São Tomé and Príncipe	PCP	FKKD	Príncipe Airport	
São Tomé	São Tomé and Príncipe	TMS	FPST	São Tomé International Airport	

== Fleet ==
As of May 2014 Africa's Connection STP fleet consists of the following aircraft:

Eagle Atlantic Airlines fleet
Aircraft	In Service	Passengers		
Aircraft	In Service	C	Y	Total
Dornier 228	3		19	19
Total	3			
