= Ana Chaves Bay =

- Baía de Ana Chaves (Portuguese)
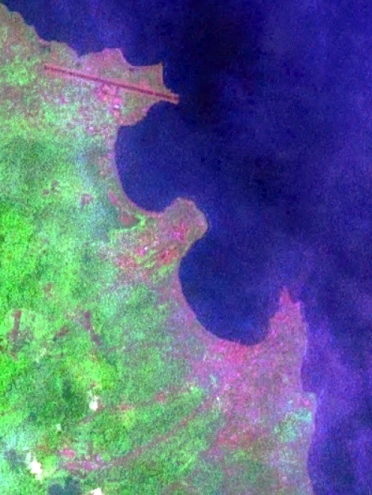
- Satellite image of the city of São Tomé and Ana Chaves Bay

- Ana Chaves Bay at the northeast of São Tomé Island
- Location: São Tomé and Príncipe
- Coordinates: 0°20′52″N 6°43′42″E
- Type: Bay
- Ocean/sea sources: Atlantic Ocean
- Settlements: São Tomé

Ana Chaves Bay (Portuguese: Baía de Ana Chaves) is a bay on the northeast coast of São Tomé Island in São Tomé and Príncipe. The capital city of São Tomé and its port are situated by the bay. It stretches from the Ponta Oque del Rei in the north to Ponta São Sebastião in the south. Forte de São Sebastião, now part of São Sebastião Museum, occupies Ponta São Sebastião. The port of São Tomé was built at the end of the 1950s on reclaimed land that extends 0.2 miles (0.32 km) north of Ponta São Sebastião; there is a 200 m quay at its north end, with a depth of 3 metres alongside. It is the main port of the country for solid goods; the port of Neves is the main point of entry for liquid fuels. The bay is generally shallow, offering anchorage for small vessels in depths of less than 5 metres (16 ft).

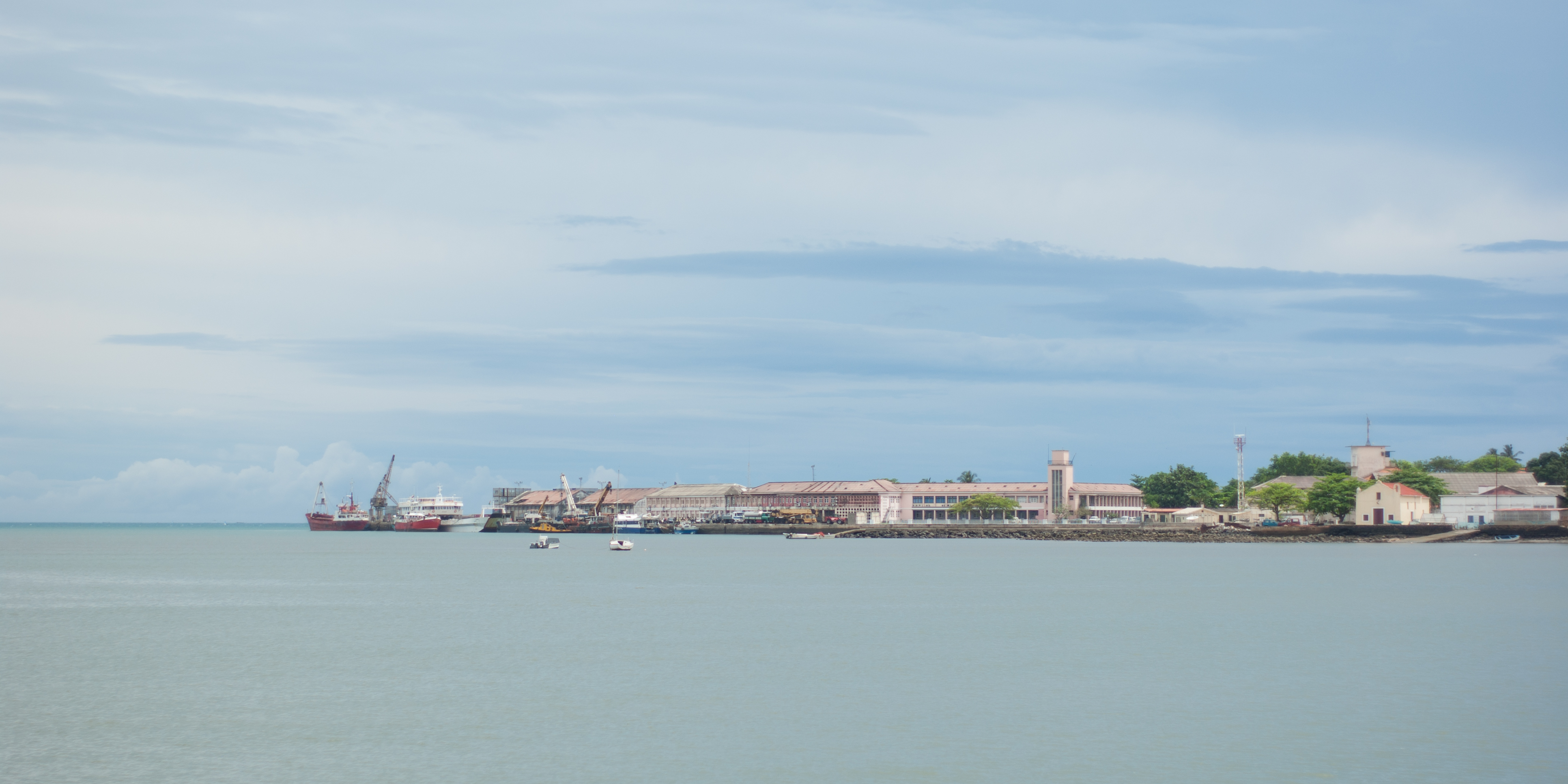
Ana Chaves Bay and the centre of São Tomé City

There is a lighthouse at Ponta Oque del Rei at the northwestern end of the bay, built in 1994. Its focal height is 9 metres and its range is 6 nmi (11 km; 6.9 mi). Another light is the São Sebastião Lighthouse at the southeastern end of the bay, built in 1928. Its focal height is 14 metres and its range is 12 nmi (22 km; 14 mi).

On 23 May 2006, Air São Tomé and Príncipe's only aircraft, a DHC-6 Twin Otter Series 300, crashed in Ana Chaves Bay in the north east of São Tomé Island during a training flight. There were four fatalities, and the aircraft was damaged beyond repair.

In 2011, the government of São Tomé and Príncipe granted a long-term concession to Angolan state oil company Sonangol to control and develop the port in which Sonangol have been reported to have invested US$30 million in developing a free trade zone.

== See also ==
- List of ports in São Tomé and Príncipe
