= STP Airways =

Flag carrier of São Tomé and Príncipe

Sao Tome & Principe Airways
IATA	ICAO	Call sign
8F	STP	SAOTOME AIRWAYS
- Founded: 2006; 20 years ago
- Commenced operations: 18 August 2008; 18 years ago
- Hubs: São Tomé International Airport
- Fleet size: 1
- Destinations: 3
- Parent company: Banco Equador (14%); EuroAtlantic Airways (38%)
- Headquarters: São Tomé, São Tomé and Príncipe
- Website: stairways.st

STP Airways is the national airline of São Tomé and Príncipe. It is currently on the list of carriers banned from operating into the European Union, so its flights are operated by the Portuguese airline EuroAtlantic Airways.

== History ==
STP Airways commenced operations on 18 August 2008 with flights between Lisbon, Portugal, and São Tomé, São Tomé and Príncipe, with a Boeing 767 aircraft leased from parent company, EuroAtlantic Airways. Currently, STP Airways used a EuroAtlantic Airways B737-800 on a weekly Lisbon service.

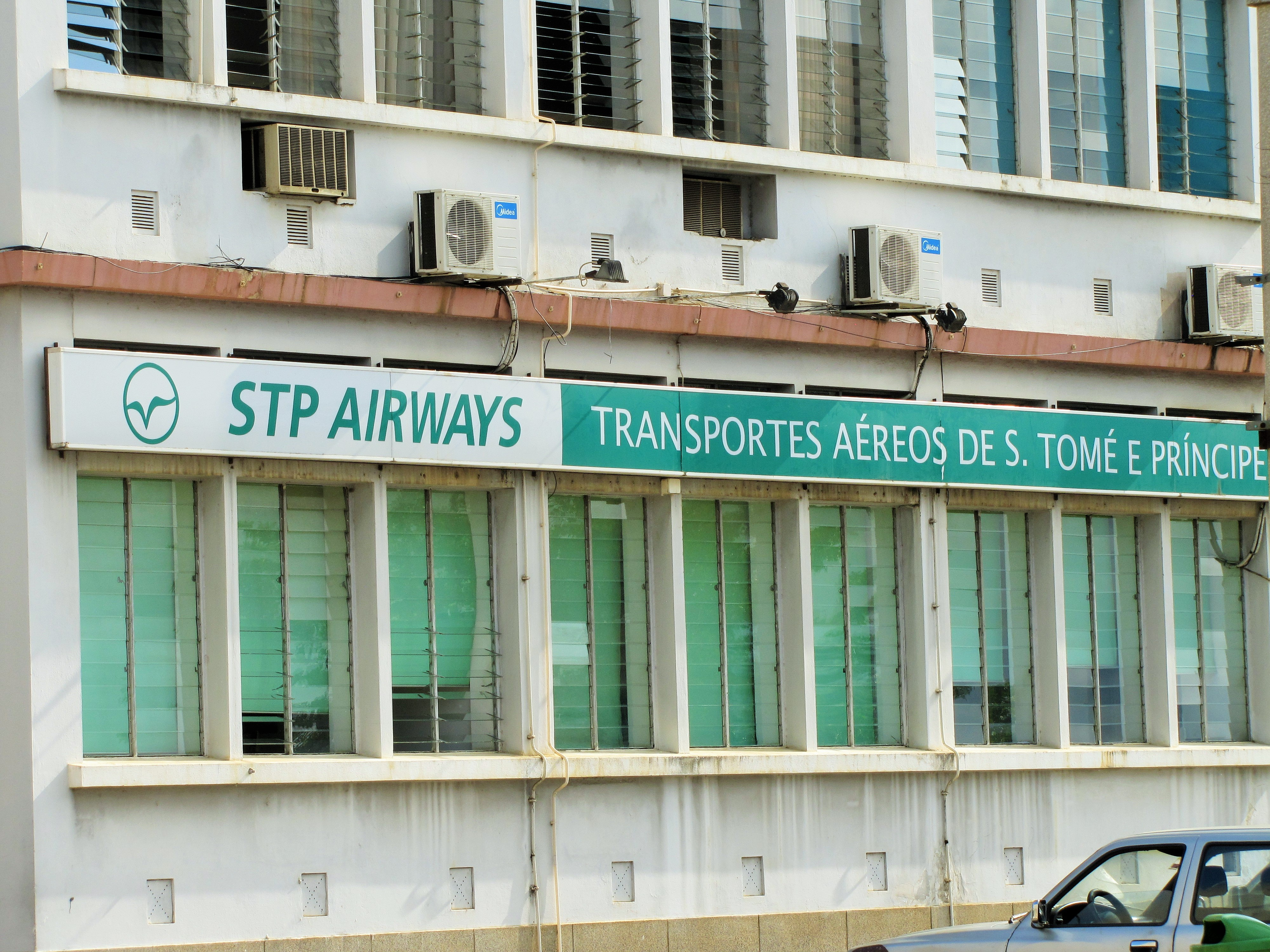
STP Airways head office in São Tomé

== Destinations ==
As of October 2025, STP Airways operates to the following destinations:

City	Country	Airport	Notes
Lisbon	Portugal	Lisbon Airport	
Príncipe	São Tomé and Príncipe	Príncipe Airport	
São Tomé	São Tomé and Príncipe	São Tomé International Airport	Base

== Fleet ==
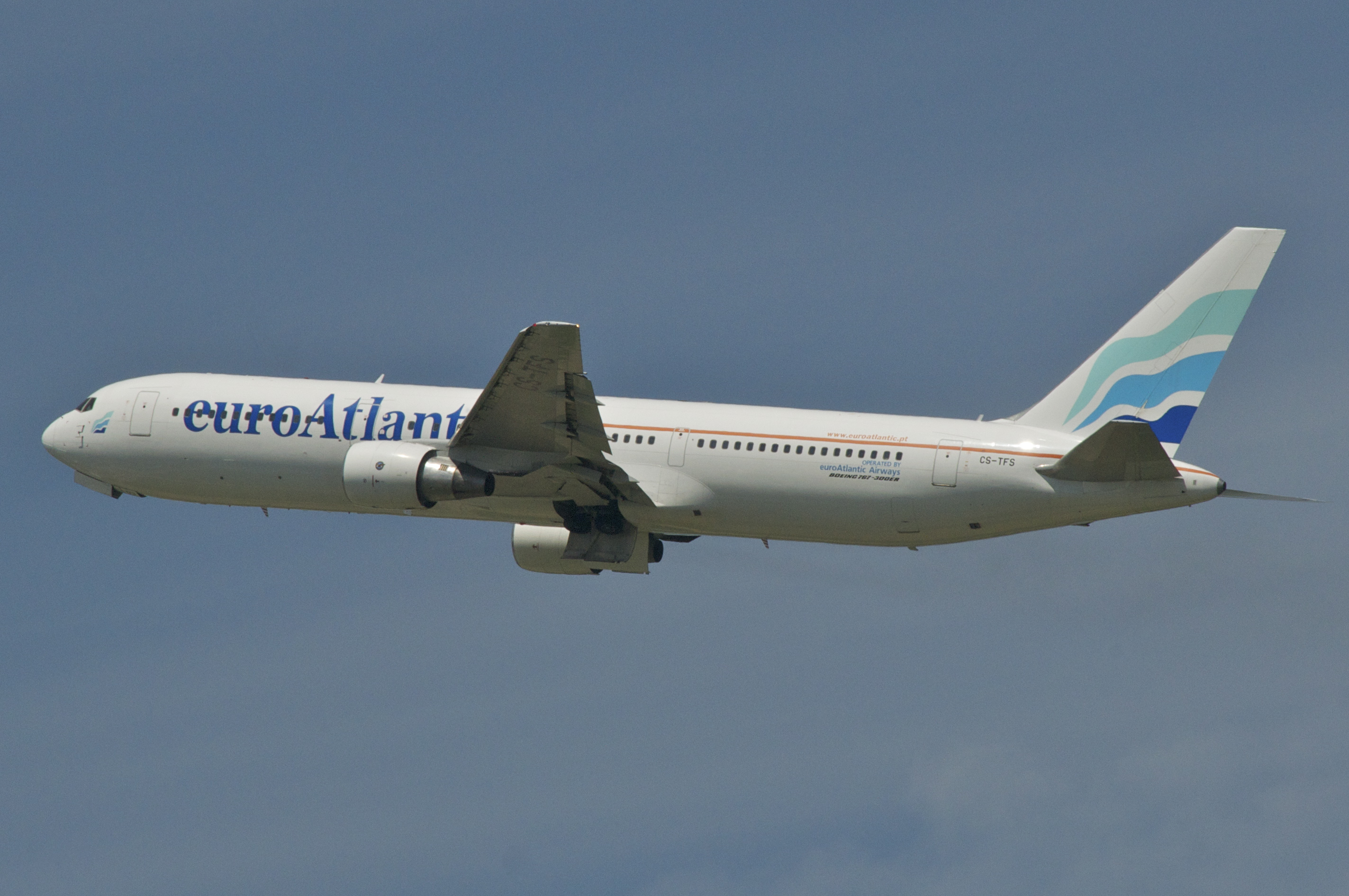
A Euro Atlantic Airways Boeing 767-300ER operated for STP Airways

As of August 2019, the STP Airways fleet uses the following aircraft:

STP Airways fleet
Aircraft	In fleet	Orders	Passengers	Notes
Boeing 767-300ER	1	0	273	Operated by EuroAtlantic Airways
Total	1	0		

The airline also operates Dornier 228s on flights to Príncipe. In the past, STP Airways used to operate two Boeing 767-300ER and 1 De Havilland Canada DHC-6 Twin Otter from its parent company, EuroAtlantic Airways although the de Havilland Canada DHC-6 Twin Otter was lent by TAP Portugal. (CS-TFS and CS-TFT). Both planes returned to EuroAtlantic by 2013. Since then, STP Airways started to operate a Boeing 737-800, also from EuroAtlantic. However, in May 2015, the company resumed operating one Boeing 767.
