= List of political parties in São Tomé and Príncipe =

São Tomé and Príncipe has a multi-party system.

== The parties ==
=== Parliamentary parties ===
| Party | Abbr. | Leader | Political position | Ideology | Assembly |
|---|---|---|---|---|---|
| Independent Democratic Action; Acção Democrática Independente | ADI | Patrice Trovoada | Centre to centre-right | Liberalism; Christian democracy | 25 / 55 |
| Movement for the Liberation of São Tomé and Príncipe – Social Democratic Party; Movimento de Libertação de São Tomé e Príncipe – Partido Social Democrata | MLSTP/PSD | Jorge Bom Jesus | Centre-left to left-wing | Social democracy; Democratic socialism; Left-wing nationalism | 23 / 55 |
| Democratic Convergence Party/MDFM–UDD; Partido de Convergência Democrática/MDFM–UDD | PCD/MDFM-UDD | Leonel Mário d'Alva | | Social market economy; Conservatism; Economic liberalism | 5 / 55 |
| Movement of Independent Citizens – Socialist Party; Movimento Cidadãos Independentes – Partido Socialista | MCI–PS | António Monteiro | | | 2 / 55 |

=== Other parties ===
- Liberal Democratic Order (Ordem Liberal Democrata)
- Force for Change Democratic Movement – Liberal Party (Movimento Democrático das Forças da Mudança – Partido Liberal)
- Christian Democratic Front (Frente Democrática Cristã)
- São Toméan Workers Party (Partido Trabalhista Santomense)
- Social Liberal Party (Partido Liberal Social)(defunct)
- Uê Kédadji coalition (defunct)
  - Democratic Renovation Party (Partido da Renovação Democrática)
  - National Union for Democracy and Progress (União Nacional para a Democracia e Progresso)
  - Opposition Democratic Coalition (Coligaçao Democrática da Oposiçao)
  - People's Party of Progress (Partido Popular do Progresso)
  - Social Renewal Party (Partido da Renovação Social)
- National Platform for Development (Plataforma Nacional para Desenvolvimento)
- Stability and Social Progress Party (Partido da Estabilidade e Progresso Social)
- Social Democratic Movement - Green Party of São Tomé and Príncipe (Movimento Social Democrata - Partido Verde São Tomé and Príncipe)

== Exiled political parties (defunct) ==
- Independent Democratic Union of São Tomé and Príncipe (União Democrãtica Independente de São Tomé e Príncipe)
- National Democratic Action of São Tomé and Príncipe (Acção Democrática Nacional de São Tomé e Príncipe)
- National Resistance Front of São Tomé and Príncipe (Frente de Resistência Nacional de São Tomé e Príncipe)
- National Resistance Front of São Tomé and Príncipe-Renewal (Frente de Resistência Nacional de São Tomé e Príncipe-Renovada)

== See also ==
- Politics of São Tomé and Príncipe
- List of political parties by country
