= 2021 São Toméan presidential election =

- 18 July 2021 (first round); 5 September 2021 (second round)
- Registered: 123,301
- Turnout: 67.76% (first round); 65.32% (second round)
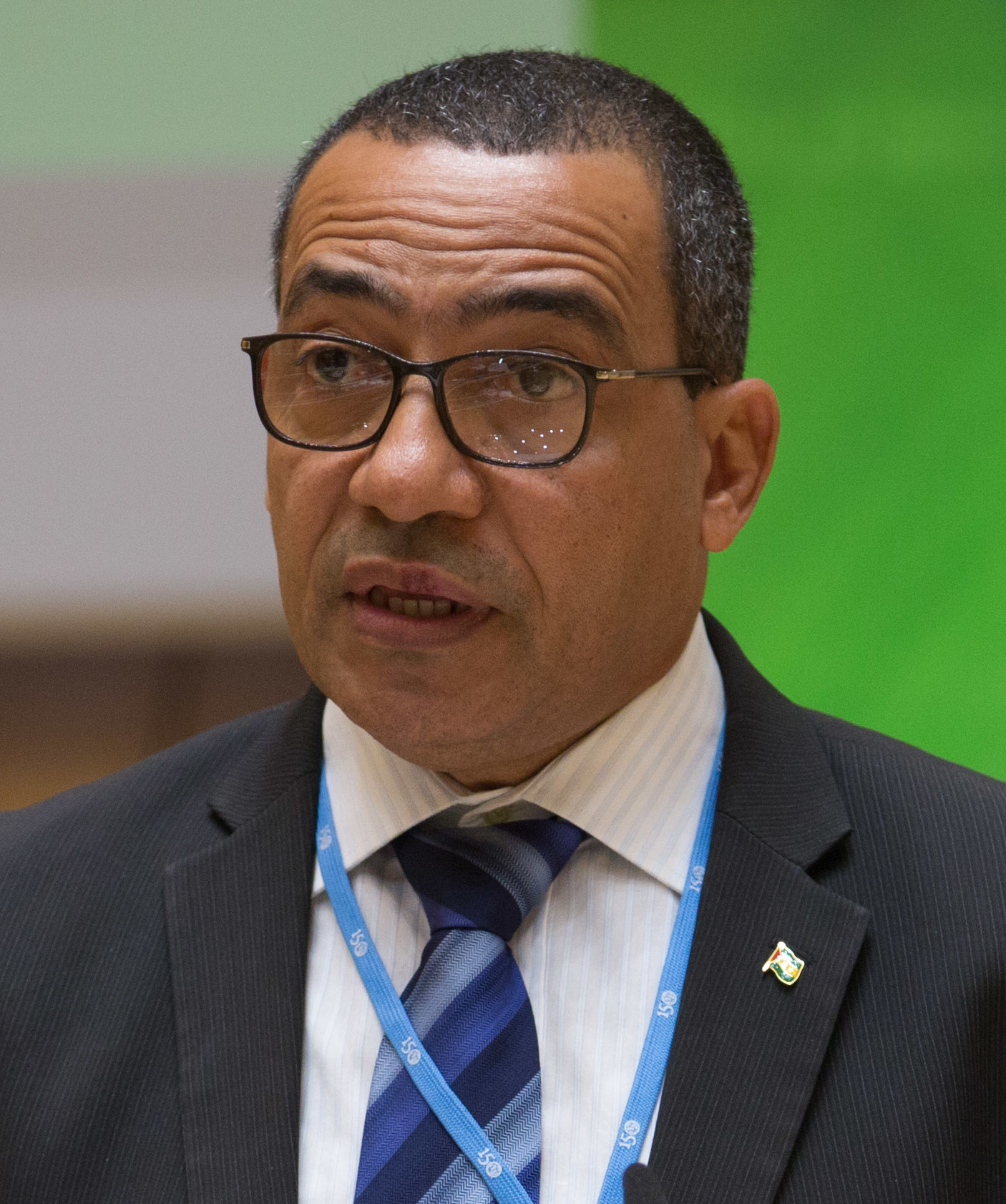

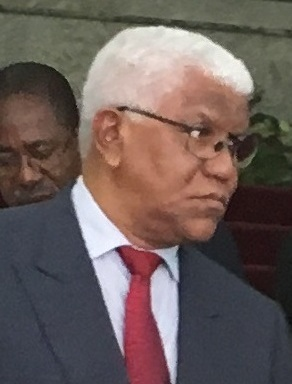
Nominee	Carlos Vila Nova	Guilherme Posser da Costa
Party	ADI	MLSTP–PSD
Popular vote	45,481	33,557
Percentage	57.54%	42.46%
President before election
Evaristo Carvalho
ADI
Elected President
Carlos Vila Nova
ADI

Presidential elections were held in São Tomé and Príncipe on 18 July 2021. As no presidential candidate received a majority of the vote, a second round was originally scheduled to be held on 8 August 2021. However, following an objection to the first-round result, the second round was postponed to 29 August 2021, and later postponed again to 5 September 2021.

The second round was won by Carlos Vila Nova of Independent Democratic Action, who received 58% of the vote, defeating Guilherme Posser da Costa of the MLSTP–PSD. Turnout for the second round was around 65%.

== Electoral system ==
The President of São Tomé and Príncipe is elected using the two-round system for a five-year term. If no candidate receives more than 50% of the vote in the first round of voting, a run-off is held with the top two candidates. The role of president is largely ceremonial, with power in the hands of the prime minister.

A total of 123,302 voters were registered, of which 14,693 were abroad, including 7,378 in Portugal.

== Candidates ==
Incumbent president Evaristo Carvalho did not seek re-election. Former prime minister Patrice Trovoada had been mentioned as a potential candidate, despite corruption allegations; he also did not file as a candidate.

Elsa Garrido, president of the Social Democratic Movement – Green Party announced her candidacy on 23 December 2020.

In total, 19 candidates filed to run.

Candidate	Party	Notes
Jorge Amado	Independent (member of MLSTPPSD)	
Abel Bom Jesus	Independent	Farmer
Miques João Bonfim	Independent (member of MSD–PVSTP)	
Elsa Garrido	MSD–PVSTP	
Roberto Garrido	Independent	Civil servant
Aurélio Martins	Independent (member of MLSTP–PSD)	
Victor Monteiro	Independent (member of MLSTP–PSD)	
Carlos Neves	MDFM – UDD Union	
Delfim Neves	Democratic Convergence Party	
Maria das Neves	Independent (member of MLSTP–PSD)	
Olinto das Neves	Independent	Former Director of Land Transportation
Elsa Teixeira Pinto	Independent (member of MLSTP–PSD)	
Guilherme Posser da Costa	MLSTP–PSD	
Manuel do Rosário	Independent	Teacher, farmer and ecologist
Júlio Silva	Movement of Independent Citizens of São Tomé and Príncipe	
Carlos Stock	Independent	
Eugénio Tiny	Independent	
Moisés Viegas	Independent	International consultant, entrepreneur and speaker, co-founder of the NGO Núcleo Solidário de São Tomé e Príncipe.
Carlos Vila Nova	Independent Democratic Action	

== Campaign ==
For the first round, the campaign took place in the two weeks prior to election day. Most of the candidates denounced corruption in the country. In his 12 July national holiday speech, outgoing president Evaristo Carvalho denounced the practice of "bathing" ("banho"), or buying votes, as "exploitation of the poverty of citizens. The Union for Progress and Change in Principe, the majority party in the Príncipe island assembly since its founding in 2006, did not support a candidate.

The second round was delayed while the courts considered a petition filed by third-place candidate Delfim Neves alleging fraud in the first round, which was ultimately rejected. The campaign for the second round began on 26 August and lasted ten days plus. On the first day of the campaign, Minister of Health Edgar Neves warned of the exponential increase in the number of cases of COVID-19 and that a third wave of the pandemic was beginning in the country.

== Conduct ==
According to the president of the National Electoral Commission, Fernando Maquengo, the campaign took place in an atmosphere of peace and tranquility. The election was marked by protective measures related to the COVID-19 pandemic. Gatherings were forbidden and social distancing was mandatory, instructions that were not always respected by the candidates.

Four election observation missions were sent, from the African Union, the Economic Community of Central African States (including representatives from Angola, Guinea-Bissau, Mali, and Cameroon) the United States, and Japan. In a preliminary report, African Union observers praised the "peaceful and calm environment" in which the second round took place.

Voting took place at 304 polling stations, with 42 polling stations for overseas voters.

== Results ==
The second round was won by Carlos Vila Nova of the country's largest opposition party, Independent Democratic Action, who received 58% of the vote, defeating Guilherme Posser da Costa of the ruling MLSTP–PSD. Turnout for the second round was around 65%. The runoff was required after neither candidate reached 50% of the vote in the first round on 18 July, with Vila Nova receiving 39.5% and Posser da Costa 20.7%.

Candidate	Party	First round		Second round	
Candidate	Party	Votes	%	Votes	%
Carlos Vila Nova	Independent Democratic Action	32,022	41.79	45,481	57.54
Guilherme Posser da Costa	MLSTP–PSD	16,829	21.96	33,557	42.46
Delfim Neves	Democratic Convergence Party	13,691	17.87		
Abel da Silva Bom Jesus	Independent	2,907	3.79		
Maria das Neves	Independent	2,696	3.52		
Júlio Lopes Lima da Silva	Movement of Independent Citizens	1,615	2.11		
Victor Tavares Monteiro	Independent	1,477	1.93		
Moisés Cravid do Sacramento Viegas	Independent	1,326	1.73		
Carlos Neves	MDFM–UDD	718	0.94		
Aurélio Martins	Independent	537	0.70		
Elsa Teixeira Pinto	Independent	419	0.55		
Miques João do Nascimento de Jesus Bonfim	Independent	385	0.50		
Manuel Fernandes de Ceita Vaz do Rosário	Independent	384	0.50		
Elsa Garrido	MSD–PVSTP	355	0.46		
Roberto Garrido de Sousa Pontes	Independent	354	0.46		
Jorge Amado	Independent	328	0.43		
Carlos Olímpio Stock	Independent	218	0.28		
Eugénio Rodrigues da Trinidade Tiny	Independent	203	0.26		
Olinto Alfonso das Neves	Independent	162	0.21		
Total		76,626	100.00	79,038	100.00
Valid votes		81,123	97.10	79,038	98.14
Invalid/blank votes		2,424	2.90	1,497	1.86
Total votes		83,547	100.00	80,535	100.00
Registered voters/turnout		123,301	67.76	123,301	65.32
Source: STP-Press, STP-Press, STP-Press

== Aftermath ==
Vila Nova said, "With the announcement of the preliminary results, I won those elections in a clear way and this result allows me to be considered as the elected President."

The prime minister of Sao Tome and Principe, Jorge Bom Jesus, congratulated the President-elect, Carlos Vila Nova, on his victory in the second round of the presidential election last Sunday and said he was available for “all collaboration and loyalty”.

Vila Nova was also congratulated by the Angolan president João Lourenço, and the Portuguese president Marcelo Rebelo de Sousa.
