= 2022 São Toméan parliamentary election =

- 25 September 2022
- All 55 seats in the National Assembly; 28 seats needed for a majority
- Turnout: 65.36% (▼15.17pp)
Party	Leader	Vote %	Seats	+/–
ADI	Patrice Trovoada	46.88	30	+5
MLSTP–PSD	Jorge Bom Jesus	32.73	18	−5
Basta	Salvador Ramos	8.79	2	New
MCI/PS–PUN	António Monteiro	6.47	5	+3
This lists parties that won seats. See the complete results below.
Results by district.
Prime Minister before	Prime Minister after
Jorge Bom Jesus; MLSTP–PSD	Patrice Trovoada; ADI

Parliamentary elections were held in São Tomé and Príncipe on 25 September 2022. The Independent Democratic Action (ADI) led by Patrice Trovoada, then in opposition, won a majority of seats with Trovoada becoming Prime Minister for a fourth time.

== Conduct ==
A total of 10 parties and one coalition participated in the election.

Observers from the European Union (EU) were deployed for the first time following an invitation by the government of Jorge Bom Jesus. EU observers praised the elections as peaceful and free, adding it took place under overall satisfactory voting and counting operations. António Guterres the secretary-general of the United Nations, also praised the peaceful conduct of the elections, saying it is "a testament to the country’s strong democratic tradition."

== Electoral system ==
Of the 55 members of the National Assembly, 53 are elected by closed list proportional representation in seven multi-member constituencies based on the seven districts. Overseas voters are grouped in two single member electoral districts (Europe and Africa).

== Results ==
Party	Votes	%	Seats	+/–
Independent Democratic Action	36,212	46.88	30	+5
MLSTP – Social Democratic Party	25,287	32.73	18	−5
Basta Movement (supported by PCD-GR)	6,788	8.79	2	New
MCI – Socialist Party — National Unity Party	4,995	6.47	5	+3
Force for Change Democratic Movement – Liberal Party	1,597	2.07	0	0
Union of Democrats for Citizenship and Development	697	0.90	0	−1
Independent Citizens for the Development of São Tomé and Príncipe	458	0.59	0	New
Movement for the Broad Development of São Tomé and Príncipe	393	0.51	0	New
Movement for Progress–New Party	355	0.46	0	New
MSD – Green Party of São Tomé and Príncipe	275	0.36	0	0
Party of All Santomeans	195	0.25	0	0
Total	77,252	100.00	55	0
Valid votes	77,252	96.41		
Invalid votes	2,258	2.82		
Blank votes	622	0.78		
Total votes	80,132	100.00		
Registered voters/turnout	122,596	65.36		
Source: Diário da República Democrática de São Tomé e Príncipe

=== Elected MPs ===
Name	Party	Constituency
Abnildo do Nascimento d'Oliveira	ADI	Mé-Zóchi
Adllander Costa de Matos	MLSTP-PSD	Cantagalo
Afonso da Graça Varela da Silva	ADI	Água Grande
Alberto da Trindade Luís	ADI	Caué
Aleksander Monteiro Conceição Lima	ADI	Região Autónoma do Príncipe
Américo d'Oliveira dos Ramos	ADI	Lobata
Américo Soares de Barros	MLSTP-PSD	Mé-Zóchi
António Monteiro Fernandes	MCI-PS	Caué
Arlindo Barbosa Semedo	MLSTP-PSD	Lembá
Arlindo Quaresma dos Santos	ADI	Mé-Zóchi
Baltazar Albertina Quaresma	MCI-PS	Caué
Beatriz da Veiga Mendes Azevedo	MCI-PS	Caué
Bilaine Carvalho Viegas de Ceita do Nascimento	ADI	Água Grande
Carlos Emanuel dos Santos Fernandes Benguela	MLSTP-PSD	Lobata
Celisa Maria Martins dos Reis Aguiar	ADI	Cantagalo
Celmira de Almeida do Sacramento dos Santos Lourenço	ADI	Mé-Zóchi
Conceição Vieira Moreno	MLSTP-PSD	Região Autónoma do Príncipe
Danilo Neves dos Santos	MLSTP-PSD	Água Grande
Delfim Santiago das Neves	PCD-GR	Lobata
Edmilson das Neves Amoço	ADI	Água Grande
Ekeneide Lima dos Santos	ADI	Água Grande
Elákcio Afonso da Marta	MLSTP-PSD	Cantagalo
Eldimiro Emiliano Manuel	MCI-PS	Lembá
Elísio Osvaldo do Espírito Santo D’Alva Teixeira	ADI	Água Grande
Eurídice Borges Semedo Medeiros	ADI	Água Grande
Filomena Sebastião Santana Monteiro D’Alva	MLSTP-PSD	Lobata
Gabdulo Luís Fernandes da Fonseca Quaresma	MLSTP-PSD	Mé-Zóchi
Gareth Guadalupe	ADI	Água Grande
Guilherme Octaviano Viegas dos Ramos	MLSTP-PSD	Mé-Zóchi
Hélio Silva Vaz de Almeida	ADI	Cantagalo
Idalécio Augusto Quaresma	ADI	Mé-Zóchi
João Leonardo de Pina da Trindade Batista	PUN	Região Autónoma do Príncipe
Jorge Lopes Bom Jesus	MLSTP-PSD	Água Grande
José António do Sacramento Miguel	ADI	Mé-Zóchi
José Maria Afonso Barros	MLSTP-PSD	Água Grande
José Rui Tavares Cardoso	MLSTP-PSD	Lembá
Josino Malupane da Veiga	ADI	Europa
Levy do Espírito Santo Nazaré	BASTA!	Água Grande
Lourenço Aguiar Freitas	ADI	África
Maria Milagre de Pina Delgado	ADI	Região Autónoma do Príncipe
Messias Luís Fernandes Pereira	ADI	Região Autónoma do Príncipe
Nelson Mário de Carvalho Rosa Cardoso	ADI	Cantagalo
Orlando Borges da Mata	ADI	Água Grande
Ossáquio Perpétua Riôa	ADI	Cantagalo
Osvaldo António Cravid Viegas d’Abreu	MLSTP-PSD	Água Grande
Osvaldo Eduardo João	MLSTP-PSD	Caué
Osvaldo Tavares dos Santos Vaz	MLSTP-PSD	Lobata
Patrice Émery Trovoada	ADI	Lobata
Pedro Jorge de Abreu e Carvalho	ADI	Cantagalo
Raul António da Costa Cravid	ADI	Lembá
Raul do Espírito Santo Cardoso	MLSTP-PSD	Mé-Zóchi
Silvestre Moreno Mendes	ADI	Lembá
Vasth Bady Nascimento dos Santos	ADI	Água Grande
Wilter Kathelen das Neves Boa Morte	ADI	Lembá
Wuando Borges Castro de Andrade	MLSTP-PSD	Água Grande
Source: Diário da República Democrática de São Tome e Príncipe
