= 2003 São Tomé and Príncipe coup d'état =

Military coup in Central Africa

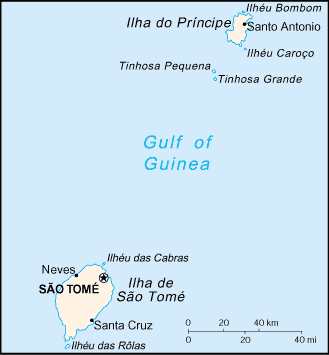
- Map of São Tomé and Príncipe
Date	16–22 July 2003
Location	São Tomé and Príncipe
Result	The junta reinstates Fradique de Menezes as president and returns power to the civilian government after receiving several concessions.

Belligerents
Government of São Tomé and Príncipe	Junta of National Salvation: Faction of the armed forces; Christian Democratic Front

Commanders and leaders
Fradique de Menezes; Maria das Neves	Fernando "Cobó" Pereira; Alércio Costa; Sabino dos Santos

Strength
	~200 São Toméan soldiers and 16 ex-members of South Africa's 32 "Buffalo" Battalion

Casualties and losses
- None

A faction of the armed forces of São Tomé and Príncipe led by Major Fernando "Cobó" Pereira overthrew the country's government in a bloodless coup d'état on 16 July 2003. It was São Tomé and Príncipe's second military coup following a similar revolt in 1995. The coup leaders claimed the coup was a response to government corruption and growing poverty. President Fradique de Menezes and the National Assembly had been in conflict since Menezes's appointment of Maria das Neves as prime minister on 3 October 2002, and the condition of the military had been neglected.

The coup was conducted while Menezes was out of the country on a private trip to Nigeria. Das Neves and other government ministers were detained in military barracks, and the coup leaders declared a military junta. The coup was planned by the Christian Democratic Front (FDC), an extra-parliamentary political party whose leadership consisted mostly of participants in a failed coup attempt in 1988, as well as former members of South Africa's 32 "Buffalo" Battalion. The ex-Buffalo soldiers were upset at das Neves because she publicly opposed them and had disclosed demands they had made of her government.

Although Pereira and his co-conspirators succeeded in seizing control of the country, international pressure and the threat of a foreign military intervention forced the junta to negotiate an immediate settlement. The coup ended a week later on 22 July, with a number of concessions made to the benefit of the military and ex-Buffalo soldiers. Menezes and the coup leaders reconciled afterwards and a new government was formed, albeit with Menezes reappointing das Neves as prime minister.

== Background and prelude ==
=== Deadlock between the president and National Assembly ===
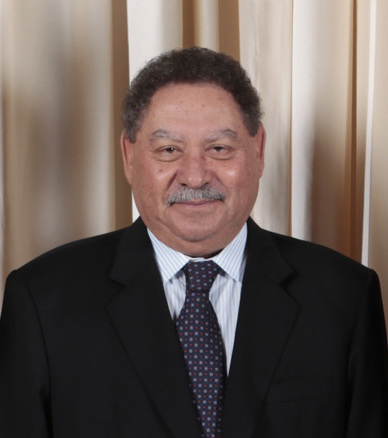
President Fradique de Menezes

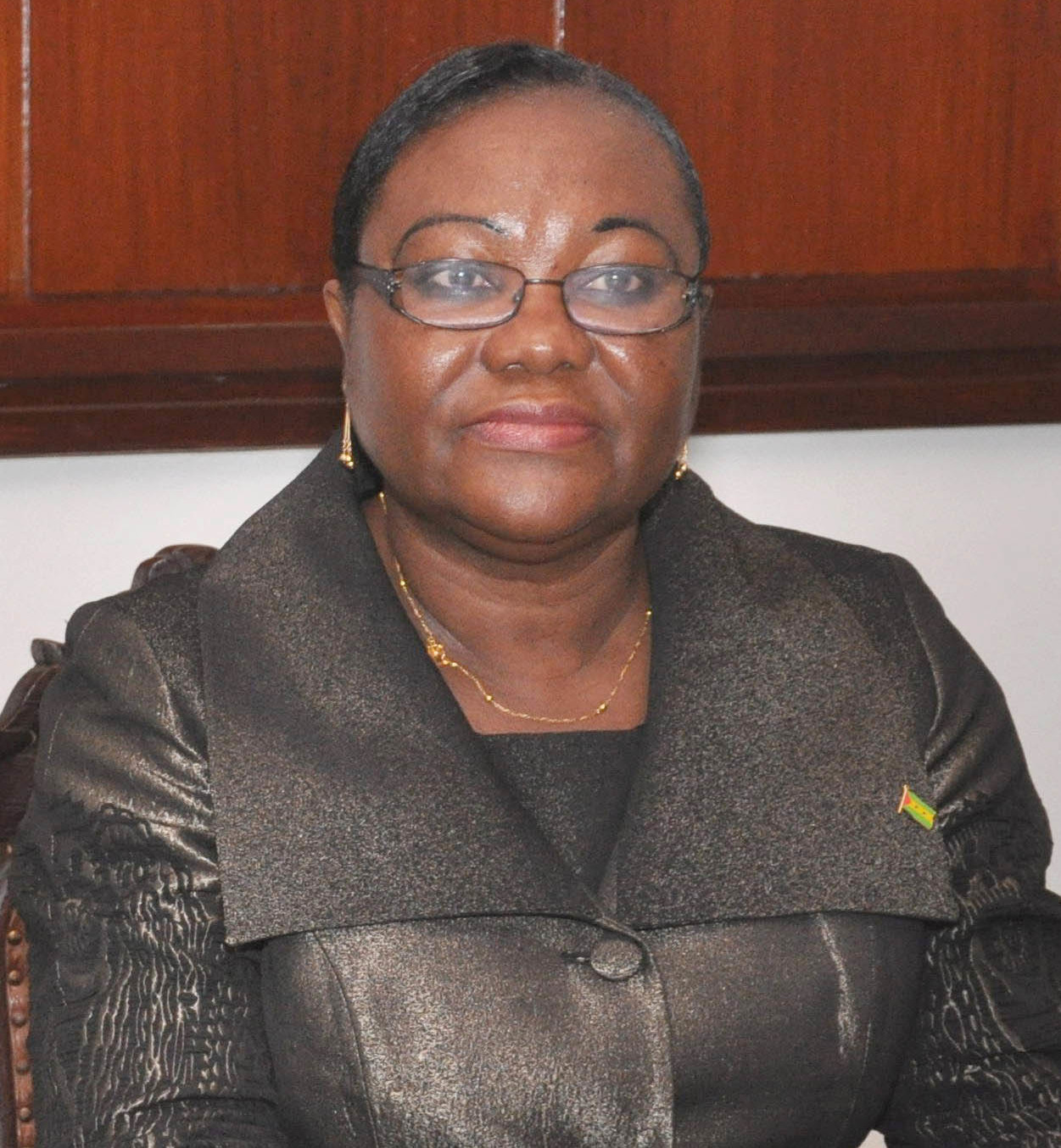
Prime Minister Maria das Neves

President Fradique de Menezes and the National Assembly were embroiled in a political deadlock after the 3 March 2002 parliamentary election. Menezes initially appointed Gabriel Costa of Independent Democratic Action (ADI) as prime minister to lead a coalition government that included all the parties in the National Assembly. However, on 27 September he dismissed the Costa government and on 3 October replaced Costa with Maria das Neves of the Movement for the Liberation of São Tomé and Príncipe – Social Democratic Party (MLSTP–PSD). The move cost Menezes the support of his own party, the Force for Change Democratic Movement (MDFM), as well as its parliamentary partner, the Democratic Convergence Party (PCD).

Consequently in late October, opposition parties tabled a motion to revise the constitution; the proposed amendments would reduce the powers of the president and increase the influence of the National Assembly. In December 2002, 52 of the 55 deputies of the National Assembly voted in favour of the amendments, but Menezes vetoed the amendments and demanded they be put to a national referendum. The National Assembly ignored Menezes's demand and approved the new constitution a second time on 17 January 2003, prompting Menezes to dissolve the National Assembly on 21 January and call for early elections on 13 April. However, Menezes and the National Assembly quickly came to a memorandum of understanding on 24 January, in which the amendments would be implemented but a referendum on the country's system of government would be held at the end of Menezes's presidential term in 2006. Conflict between Menezes and the National Assembly continued despite the memorandum of understanding, culminating in the publication of an open letter in April 2003 by Menezes's opponents, who accused him of corruption, incompetence, and a lack of transparency.

=== Discontent among the FDC and military ===
The São Toméan government had faced two coup attempts prior to 2003: a failed attempt by dissidents in 1988 and a successful one by the armed forces in 1995. The 1988 coup attempt aimed to overthrow President Manuel Pinto da Costa and replace him with the dissident Afonso dos Santos. However, it was poorly organised and its participants were mostly unarmed; three of the rebels were killed and the rest were arrested and imprisoned before being pardoned by Pinto da Costa in April 1990. The 1995 coup attempt meanwhile involved a majority of the country's soldiers, who were unhappy with the state of the military. The coup's leaders successfully seized power but relinquished control after mediation by Angola that led to government concessions to the military.

In December 1990, Afonso dos Santos founded the Christian Democratic Front (FDC) to contest the country's first multi-party elections that were taking place the following month. The FDC failed to secure any seats and remained extra-parliamentary up until the 2003 coup. The FDC leadership consisted mostly of other participants in the 1988 coup, many of whom fought for Apartheid South Africa's 32 "Buffalo" Battalion and felt entitled to compensation for their service abroad. In June 2003, das Neves announced that the government would cease its support to the ex-Buffalo soldiers, claiming the group received government benefits without working and had demanded from her government $70,000 in cash and a medium-sized farm. She also accused Afonso dos Santos of making death threats against her. By the time das Neves made her announcement, the ex-Buffalo soldiers had already been planning a coup for seven months.

The FDC found an important ally in Major Fernando "Cobó" Pereira, who headed the general staff of the armed forces. Pereira was vocal about his dissatisfaction with the state of the military, which had substandard barracks, outdated equipment, and salaries paid in arrears. In June 2003, Pereira sent a letter with the military's demands to Menezes and the National Assembly, but he never received a reply back. The FDC were aware of Pereira's grievances and asked him and the military to support their coup plans, otherwise they would fight against the armed forces. Pereira was wary of the threat that the better-trained and better-equipped ex-Buffalo soldiers posed, and agreed to help them on the condition that there would be no bloodshed.

== Coup ==
Menezes was out of the country on a private trip to a conference in the Nigerian capital Abuja when the coup began in the early hours of 16 July 2003. The rebels immediately notified the national police and the presidential guard of their plans and petitioned them not to act. Pereira led around 200 São Toméan and 16 ex–Buffalo soldiers in securing strategic sites such as São Tomé's airport, banks, and broadcasting stations. The rebels detained four government ministers and escorted them to the Quartel do Morro barracks; das Neves suffered a minor heart attack (also reported as complications of her hypertension) during her capture and was taken to the hospital instead. The rebels broadcast a message at 7:30 am local time (GMT) on national radio, ordering the seven remaining ministers, as well as members of the National Assembly, to report to the barracks within two hours. The ministers were kept in an air-conditioned room and allowed visitors and cellphone use, while the parliamentary deputies were released in the afternoon.

The coup leaders – Pereira, FDC president Alércio Costa, and FDC vice-president Sabino dos Santos – subsequently declared a military junta, the Junta of National Salvation. Costa was an ex-Buffalo soldier, and Sabino dos Santos had participated in the 1988 coup attempt. In a press conference, Pereira said the military was not interested in holding on to power and would hold early elections as soon as possible. He and his co-conspirators cited government corruption, growing discontent among the population, and the widening gap between the rich and poor as the reasons for their rebellion. The coup received a mixed reaction from the São Toméan public, with some supporting the coup's goals and others disapproving the use of armed force.

== International response, negotiations, and end ==
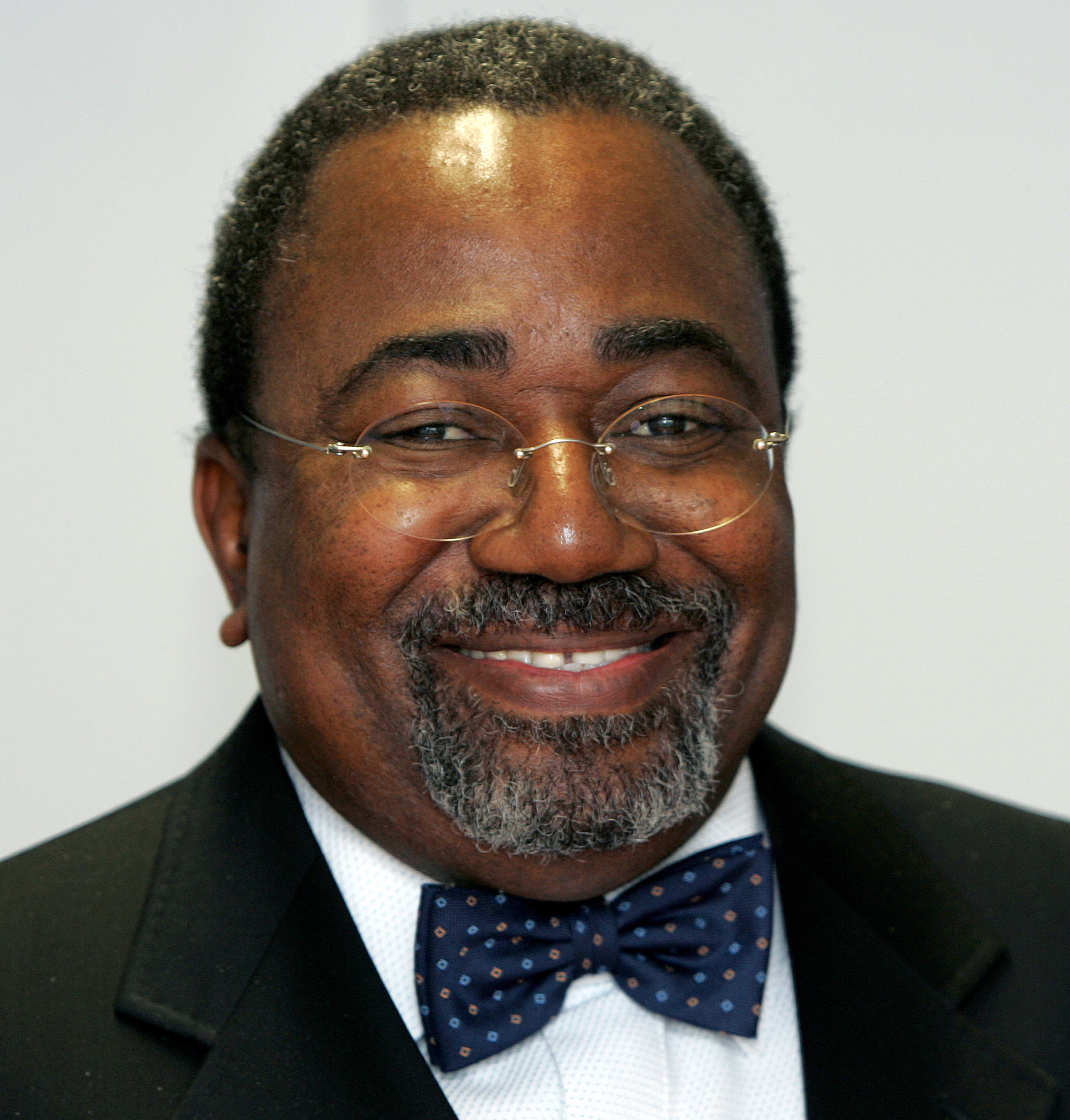
Rodolphe Adada, the chief coordinator of the negotiations

The coup was swiftly condemned by São Tomé and Príncipe's African and Western donor countries, which urged the restoration of the civilian government. The junta rejected the condemnations as hypocrisy, arguing that São Tomé and Príncipe was a sham democracy because vote buying had unduly influenced the country's elections. The junta, however, was not only isolated internationally, but it also lacked support from major political forces within the country. Nigerian President Olusegun Obasanjo and African Union Chair Joaquim Chissano reportedly met in Abuja and discussed militarily intervening as an option to end the coup, although Menezes denied such a proposal was made. Fearing a foreign military intervention nonetheless, the junta began negotiating with international mediators, mainly from Nigeria, South Africa (who negotiated with the ex-Buffalo soldiers), and the Economic Community of Central African States (CEEAC). Rodolphe Adada, the foreign minister of the Republic of the Congo, was the chief coordinator during the negotiations, as his country held the rotational presidency of the CEEAC at the time. São Tomé and Príncipe expert Gerhard Seibert suggested in 2006 that international interest in a quick resolution to the conflict may have been because of São Tomé and Príncipe's presumed oil wealth at the time. The junta's delegation consisted of seven soldiers and three FDC members.

The coup ended with the signing of a memorandum of understanding between Pereira, Menezes, and Adada on 22 July. Menezes returned to the country together with Obasanjo, underscoring Nigeria's interest in Menezes' reinstatement. The memorandum entailed a number of concessions to the coup plotters, most importantly a general amnesty and a commitment by the government to improve the conditions of the military and address the grievances of the former Buffalo soldiers. Menezes also had to concede on a number of issues as a precondition to his reinstatement; he promised to "respect the constitution and the separation of powers" and approve a law proposed by the National Assembly on "the proper use of oil revenue". Public funds were also to be managed transparently by the government, and the junta was assured that no foreign military intervention would take place in the future. The memorandum did not include any provisions concerning new elections or a change in government. A special 13-member, CEEAC-led commission was formed to monitor the implementation of the memorandum.

== Aftermath ==
Menezes made a national address about the coup on 24 July, describing it as a "dark episode" but calling for national unity in its aftermath. Three government ministers resigned in the following days, including das Neves, who stepped down on 1 August so that someone else could take her position. However, Menezes, with the support of the MLSTP–PSD, reappointed das Neves as prime minister on 4 August to form a new government. The rebels opposed the move, but in a subsequent meeting with Menezes and foreign diplomats, Costa reassured Menezes that they were not preparing another coup and the pair hugged to symbolise the end of their grievances. However, Sabino dos Santos later pledged in September that the FDC would defeat Menezes in the 2006 presidential election; Menezes was ultimately reelected to a second term.

The referendum on the system of government promised by the 24 January 2003 memorandum also never took place, as a majority of the National Assembly voted against it in 2005, arguing it was unconstitutional. This was reaffirmed in São Tomé by Portuguese constitutional expert Jorge Bacelar Gouveia, who argued that the memorandum was null and void because it could not supersede the constitution. Constitutional amendments in 2006 weakened the executive powers of the presidency, particularly in regard to foreign affairs, national defence, and the ability to dismiss the prime minister and dissolve the National Assembly. The latter change led to a period of political stability, with four governments being formed between 2006 and 2014 in comparison to thirteen between 1991 and 2006.

Among the concessions to the Buffalo soldiers was a 30-hectare (74-acre) parcel of land in Lagoa Azul, in the north of São Tomé Island. On 11 November 2022, the government seized the land from a company owned by Costa and gave it to one controlled by outgoing President of the National Assembly Delfim Neves, who promptly sold it to a German company for €1,400,000. An investigation aided by Portugual's Polícia Judiciária (Judiciary Police) concluded that the confiscation and sale of the Buffalo soldiers' land was the main reason for Costa's failed coup attempt on 25 November, in which he was killed along with three other rebels.

== See also ==
- History of São Tomé and Príncipe
