= 2026 São Toméan parliamentary election =

- 27 September 2026
- All 55 seats in the National Assembly; 28 seats needed for a majority
- Turnout: 37.26% (▼28.10pp)
Party	Leader	Vote %	Seats	+/–
MLSTP–PSD	Américo Barros	37.45	24	+6
ADI	Américo Ramos	36.50	23	−7
Basta	Salvador Ramos	9.29	2	0
MCI/PS–PUN	António Monteiro	8.49	6	+1
This lists parties that won seats. See the complete results below.
Prime Minister before	Prime Minister after
Américo Ramos; ADI	Américo Ramos; ADI

Parliamentary elections were held in São Tomé and Príncipe on 27 September 2026. No party won an outright majority, with the MLSTP – Social Democratic Party winning a plurality of 24 seats out of 55 in the National Assembly.

== Background ==
On 6 January 2025, president Carlos Vila Nova dismissed Prime Minister Patrice Trovoada and his government, citing Trovoada's prolonged absences and his government's failure to solve multiple issues. Trovoada responded calling his dismissal "illegal" and "unconstitutional". Vila Nova then selected then Minister of Justice, Ilza Amado Vaz, as prime minister. Vaz then resigned three days later on 12 January 2025, stating in a letter that her continued leadership "would not contribute to the success of public policies and the harmonious and peaceful development." Vila Nova thereafter picked Américo Ramos, who was not endorsed for the prime ministerial role by the ADI, being criticized for ignoring the majority of the National Assembly.

In the presidential election held in July of the same year, Vila Nova was re-elected president over Nito Abreu, the candidate of ADI. That same month, the Constitutional Court issued a ruling recognizing the legitimacy of an extraordinary congress held by ADI in June at which Américo Ramos proclaimed himself the new leader of ADI.

== Electoral system ==
Of the 55 members of the National Assembly, 53 are elected by closed list proportional representation in seven multi-member constituencies based on the seven districts. Overseas voters are grouped in two single member electoral districts (Europe and Africa).

== Results ==
On 28 September, the National Electoral Commission announced that MLSTP won the election with 367 more votes than the ruling ADI, marking its first election victory since 2002. Basta Movement and MCI–PUN coalition placed third and fourth respectively. The number of seats each party received was not announced, leaving that decision to the Constitutional Court. Turnout in this election was roughly the same as in the 2026 São Toméan presidential election at 41.34%, another record low turnout. In the preliminary results, Our Earth Party went fifth, Democratic Convergence placed sixth in votes, and Force for Change came last.

The electoral commission released the preliminary distribution of the 53 proportional seats on 29 September, stating that MLSTP was given 23 seats and that ADI elected 22 seats. The MCI–PUN coalition had six seats, while the Basta Movement retained its two seats in the Assembly. For the two single member abroad districts, MLSTP and ADI each won one district, bringing their seat totals to 24 and 23 seats respectively. It was also revealed that the abstention rate was higher, a rate of 62.92%, bringing the turnout rate lower to 37.08%.

Party	Votes	%	Seats	+/–
MLSTP – Social Democratic Party	18,639	37.45	24	+6
Independent Democratic Action	18,168	36.50	23	−7
Basta Movement	4,626	9.29	2	0
MCI – Socialist Party — National Unity Party	4,224	8.49	6	+1
Our Earth Party	1,826	3.67	0	New
Democratic Convergence Party	1,449	2.91	0	0
Force for Change Democratic Movement – Liberal Party	845	1.70	0	0
Total	49,777	100.00	55	0
Valid votes	49,777	90.93		
Invalid votes	4,222	7.71		
Blank votes	742	1.36		
Total votes	54,741	100.00		
Registered voters/turnout	146,918	37.26		
Source: Tribunal Constitucional

== Aftermath ==
While acknowledging that the MCI–PUN coalition had been prevented from running in five of the eight electoral districts by the Constitutional Court, MCI–PS leader Antonio Monteiro expressed gratitude that his coalition was given kingmaker status, opening the MCI–PUN bloc to coalition negotiations from both the MLSTP and the ADI. Basta Movement president Levy Nazaré resigned after his party failed to win more seats despite taking third place in the popular vote, stating that he will be absent from cabinet positions but will remain president until the next government is formed.

MLSTP–PSD president Américo Barros announced that he had been congratulated by the outgoing prime minister Américo Ramos and by his opponents as well, stating that he was starting discussions with the outgoing ADI government while waiting for the formation of the next government. However, Ramos denied congratulating Barros, stating that the ADI was still waiting for final results but remained open to a coalition.

The MCI–PS signed a supply and confidence agreement with the ADI on 7 October 2026 centered on governmental stability, but refused to join the government itself in order to maintain the bloc's own interests. The MLSTP–PSD also offered its own alternative to forming the government, stating that the party should have the right to govern, as they placed first in the election.

Despite originally granting the mandate to form the government to the first-placed MLSTP–PSD, President Vila Nova declared that the party failed to provide a guarantee of sufficient parliamentary support and instead reappointed Ramos and the ADI to another term on 12 November 2026.
