= 2006 São Toméan parliamentary election =

- 26 March 2006
- All 55 seats in the National Assembly; 28 seats needed for a majority
- Turnout: 66.85% (▲0.56pp)
Party	Leader	Vote %	Seats	+/–
MDFL-PL – PCD-GR	Tomé Vera Cruz	37.71	23	0
MLSTP–PSD	Guilherme Posser da Costa	30.21	20	−4
ADI	Patrice Trovoada	20.50	11	
MNR		4.83	1	New
This lists parties that won seats. See the complete results below.
Prime Minister before	Prime Minister after
Maria do Carmo Silveira; MLSTP–PSD	Tomé Vera Cruz; MDFM – PL

Parliamentary elections were held in São Tomé and Príncipe on 26 March 2006.

== Parties and Coalitions ==
Eight political parties and two coalitions contested the election.

- Movement for the Liberation of São Tomé and Príncipe-Social Democratic Party (MLSTP-PSD) – Largest party in the outgoing National Assembly, winning 24 out of 55 seats in the March 2002 election.
- Force for Change Democratic Movement–Democratic Convergence Party (MDFM-PCD) – Two party coalition that won 23 seats in the 2002 election. The coalition was formed in late 2001 by supporters of President Fradique de Menezes.
- Ue-Kedadji (UK) – A five party coalition that won 8 seats in the 2002 election. The coalition's member parties are the Democratic Renovation Party (PRD), National Union for Democracy and Progress (UNDP), Opposition Democratic Coalition (CODO), People's Party of Progress (PPP), and the Social Renewal Party (PSR).
- Independent Democratic Action (ADI) – Contested the 2002 election as part of the Uê Kédadji coalition, but has since withdrawn and will participate in this year's poll as a single entity.
- São Toméan Workers Party (PTS) – Participated in the 2002 election, but failed to gain representation in the National Assembly.
- Christian Democratic Front (FDC) – Small party that participated in the 1991, 1994, and 1998 National Assembly elections. In all three elections, the party won less than 2% of the vote.
- Social Liberal Party (PLS) – Newly formed political party.
- New Way Movement (NR) – Newly formed political party.

== Results ==
Party	Votes	%	Seats	+/–
MDFM-PL – PCD-GR	19,640	37.71	23	0
MLSTP/PSD	15,733	30.21	20	–4
Independent Democratic Action	10,678	20.50	11	–
New Way Movement	2,515	4.83	1	New
Union of Democrats for Citizenship and Development	1,156	2.22	0	New
Christian Democratic Front	796	1.53	0	New
Ue-Kedadji	534	1.03	0	–
Social Liberal Party	413	0.79	0	New
Generation Hope	336	0.65	0	New
São Toméan Workers Party	284	0.55	0	0
Total	52,085	100.00	55	0
Valid votes	52,085	97.58		
Invalid/blank votes	1,293	2.42		
Total votes	53,378	100.00		
Registered voters/turnout	79,849	66.85		
Source: African Election Database
