= 2014 São Toméan parliamentary election =

- 12 October 2014
- All 55 seats in the National Assembly; 28 seats needed for a majority
- Turnout: 74.91% (▼14.10pp)
Party	Leader	Vote %	Seats	+/–
ADI	Patrice Trovoada	52.58	33	+7
MLSTP–PSD	Jorge Amado	24.71	16	−5
PCD		10.95	5	−2
UDD	Gabriel Costa	1.87	1	+1
This lists parties that won seats. See the complete results below.
Prime Minister before	Prime Minister after
Gabriel Costa; UDD	Patrice Trovoada; ADI

Parliamentary elections were held in São Tomé and Príncipe on 12 October 2014, alongside regional and local elections. The result was a majority for the opposition Independent Democratic Action led by 2-time Prime Minister Patrice Trovoada, which won 33 of the 55 seats in the National Assembly.

== Background ==
Following the 2010 election in which the Independent Democratic Action got a plurality, the government lost a vote of confidence midway through its term.

== Electoral system ==
The 55 members of the National Assembly were elected by proportional representation in seven multi-member constituencies using the closed list system.

== Conduct ==
The African Union Election Observation Mission (AUEOM) was tasked with monitoring the election. The 24-member mission was led by Angolan França Van-Dúnem, who said, after a meeting with President Manuel Pinto da Costa, the mission sought to ensure the election was run in order and peace. There was also an observation mission from the Community of Portuguese Language Countries (CPLP). The CPLP report stated that the elections were "transparent, free and fair, and were conducted in an orderly manner. It mentioned that there were some incidents, but that they were unlikely to affect the final results.

== Results ==
Party	Votes	%	Seats	+/–
Independent Democratic Action	35,267	52.58	33	+7
MLSTP/PSD	16,573	24.71	16	−5
Democratic Convergence Party	7,342	10.95	5	−2
Force for Change Democratic Movement – Liberal Party	2,217	3.31	0	−1
National Platform for Development	2,207	3.29	0	0
Party of Stability and Social Progress	1,655	2.47	0	New
Union of Democrats for Citizenship and Development	1,252	1.87	1	+1
National Union for Democracy and Progress	163	0.24	0	0
São Toméan Workers Party	138	0.21	0	New
Opposition Democratic Coalition	98	0.15	0	0
Christian Democratic Front	95	0.14	0	0
Socialist Movement	68	0.10	0	0
Total	67,075	100.00	55	0
Valid votes	67,075	96.50		
Invalid/blank votes	2,435	3.50		
Total votes	69,510	100.00		
Registered voters/turnout	92,790	74.91		
Source: CEN
