= 2018 São Toméan parliamentary election =

- 7 October 2018
- All 55 seats in the National Assembly; 28 seats needed for a majority
- Turnout: 80.53% (▲5.62pp)
| Party | Leader | Vote % | Seats | +/– |
|---|---|---|---|---|
| ADI | Patrice Trovoada | 41.81 | 25 | −8 |
| MLSTP–PSD | Jorge Bom Jesus | 40.32 | 23 | +7 |
| PCD-GR – UDD | Arlindo Carvalho | 9.50 | 5 | −1 |
| MCI/PS | Aurélio Martins | 2.11 | 2 | New |
This lists parties that won seats. See the complete results below.
Results by district.
| Prime Minister before | Prime Minister after |
|---|---|
| Patrice Trovoada; ADI | Jorge Bom Jesus; MLSTP–PSD |

Parliamentary elections were held in São Tomé and Príncipe on 7 October 2018. Municipal elections and elections to the regional council on Príncipe were held alongside them.

== Electoral system ==
The 55 members of the National Assembly are elected by closed list proportional representation in seven multi-member constituencies.

== Parties ==
The elections were contested by five parties and two electoral alliances, three of which presented a candidate for Prime Minister; the ruling Independent Democratic Action (ADI) under Prime Minister Patrice Trovoada, the main opposition party the centre-left MLSTP-PSD led by its newly elected president former Minister of Education and Culture Jorge Bom Jesus, and a centre-right coalition formed in August between the MDFM–UDD Union (a merger between the MDFM-PL and UDD) and the Democratic Convergence Party (PCD). The coalition fielded the leader of PCD Arlindo Carvalho as its candidate for Prime Minister.

In addition, the newly established People's Strength Party, the alliance between the Social Democratic Movement and the Green Party (MSD–PVSTP), the Party for all Santomerese (PTOS), and the Caué-based Movement of Independent Citizens of São Tomé and Príncipe (MCISTP) contested the election.

== Results ==
Unlike previous elections in the multi-party era, results were not announced on election night for the two largest constituencies, Água Grande and Mé-Zóchi, containing a total of 26 seats. Results from the five smaller constituencies gave 14 seats to the ADI, 12 to the MLSTP/PSD, one to the PCD–MDFM–UDD coalition and two to the MCISTP in the Caué constituency.

On election night the Secretary General of the ADI Levy Nazaré announced the party had gotten 26 seats and would continue to govern with support from the MCISTP, whereas MLSTP/PSD had only gotten 23 seats, but this announcement was made before all votes had been counted.

The final result was 25 seats to the ADI, 23 to the MLSTP-PSD, 5 to the PCD/MDFM-UDD coalition and 2 to the MCISTP, both in the Caué constituency.

| Party | Votes | % | Seats | +/– |
|---|---|---|---|---|
| Independent Democratic Action | 32,805 | 43.68 | 25 | –8 |
| MLSTP/PSD | 31,634 | 42.13 | 23 | +7 |
| PCD–MDFM–UDD | 7,451 | 9.92 | 5 | –1 |
| MCISTP | 1,659 | 2.21 | 2 | New |
| People's Strength Party | 823 | 1.10 | 0 | New |
| MSD–PVSTP | 499 | 0.66 | 0 | 0 |
| Party for All Santomerese | 224 | 0.30 | 0 | New |
| Total | 75,095 | 100.00 | 55 | – |
| Valid votes | 75,095 | 95.87 | | |
| Invalid/blank votes | 3,236 | 4.13 | | |
| Total votes | 78,331 | 100.00 | | |
| Registered voters/turnout | 97,274 | 80.53 | | |
Source: CEN

== Aftermath ==
At a joint press conference the leaders of MLSTP/PSD and the PCD–MDFM–UDD coalition announced they had a pre-election agreement to govern together and requested that Jorge Bom Jesus should be made Prime Minister, but ADI insisted that the country had had minority governments before and that they as the biggest party should form the government.

The ADI asked for verification of the more than 2,000 blank and void votes hoping to gain an extra seat and obtain a majority together with MCISTP. This unleashed riots in parts of the country as opposition supporters feared the government would rig the results.

On 12 October the police announced that there would be a 72 hour ban on demonstrations after the Constitutional Court declares the final results. The opposition claimed that this was illegal, as only the President could authorize a ban on the advice of the government and with the consent of the National Assembly, and that they would not comply with the ban if the final results deviate from the ones issued by the electoral commission.

The proclamation of the ban happened after President Evaristo Carvalho had left the country to participate in the celebration of the 50th anniversary of Equatorial Guinea's independence. In the airport Carvalho said that he would follow the constitution and authorize the party with the most seats to form the new government, indicating that Patrice Trovoada could continue as Prime Minister despite the ADI losing their majority.

On 30 November the President nominated Jorge Bom Jesus as Prime Minister. The new government was sworn in on 3 December.
