= Citizens' Movement =

Citizens' Movement may refer to:

- Citizens' Movement (Colombia)
- Citizens' Movement (Iceland)
- Citizens' Movement (Mexico)
- Independent Citizens Movement, United States Virgin Islands
- Concerned Citizens' Movement, Saint Kitts and Nevis
- Citizen and Republican Movement, France
- Geneva Citizens' Movement, Switzerland
- Tricolour Citizens' Movement, Czech Republic
- Citizens' Movement for Change, Belgium
- Movement of Independent Citizens of São Tomé and Príncipe – Socialist Party, São Tomé and Príncipe
- Civic Movement, Czech Republic
- Civil Movement, Hungary

== See also ==
- (title with the word citizen or citizens and the word movement)
