= Elsa Garrido =

Sao Tomean politician and environmentalist

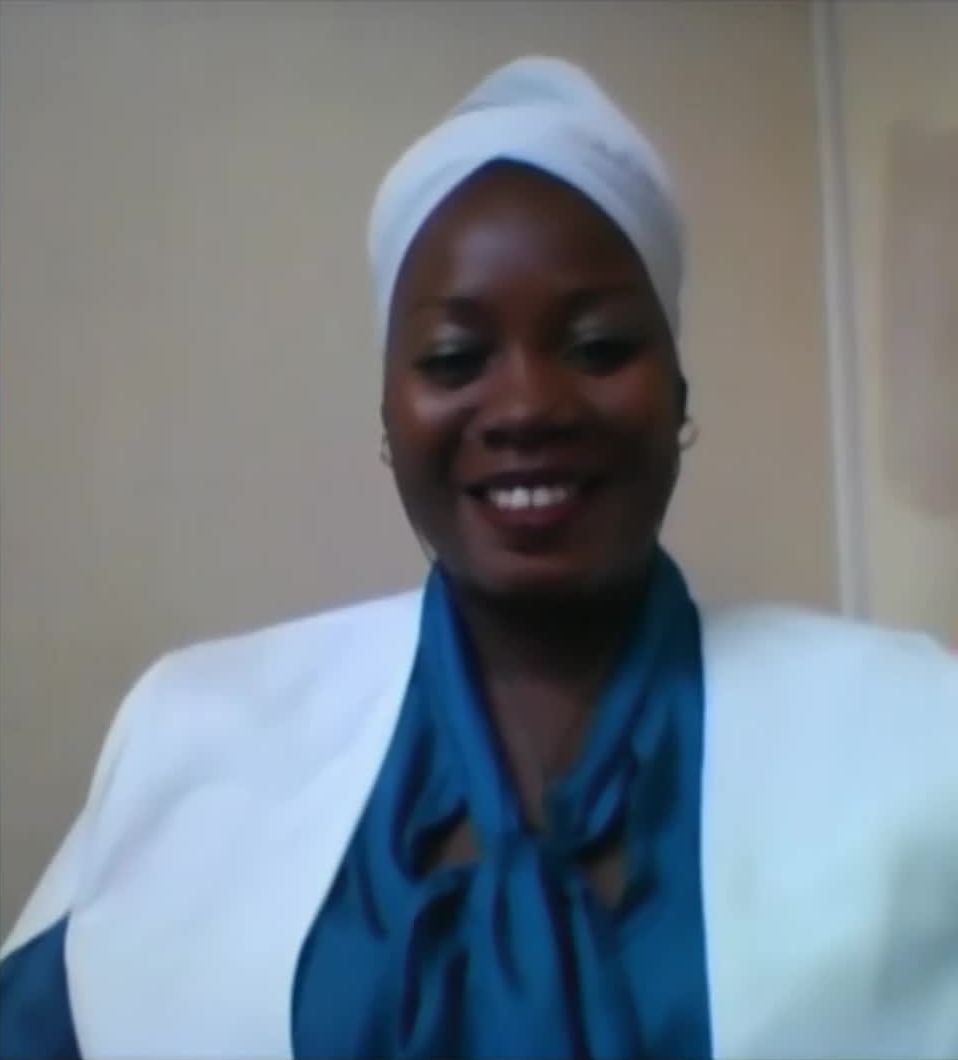
- Born: 23 February 1977 (age 49)
- Occupations: Politician; Environmentalist
- Notable work: She is President of the Social Democratic Movement/Green Party of São Tomé and Príncipe.

Elsa Maria Garrido de Ceita do Espírito Santo (born 23 February 1977) is a Sao Tomean politician and environmentalist. She is President of the Social Democratic Movement/Green Party of São Tomé and Príncipe, and presidential candidate in the 2021 São Toméan presidential election.

Garrido moved to France in the 1990s. In 2011, she founded the NGO Terra Verde, dedicated to health and poverty alleviation in her home country. In 2017, while settling in Portugal, she went on a 19-day hunger strike in protest of the importation of genetically modified organisms into Sao Tomean agriculture.

After returning to Sao Tome and Principe, in 2017 Garrido founded the Social Democratic Movement/Green Party of Sao Tome and Principe, an environmental party that she has chaired since. In the 2018 legislative elections, she was the first woman in her country's history to lead a party, and is the first woman to run for President in 2021. She works for the Minister of Public Works, Infrastructure, Natural Resources and Environment.

== Political career ==
Garrido had an active role in the formation of environmentalist political party Social Democratic Movement - Green Party of São Tomé and Príncipe. She was elected as the president of the party during November 2017. The political party consequently took part in municipality and legislative election in 2018, though no member of the party successfully won any seat. Garrido unsuccessfully ran in the 2021 presidential election candidate, being the first Santomean woman to run for president and the first woman to lead a political party.
