= 2006 São Toméan presidential election =

- 30 July 2006
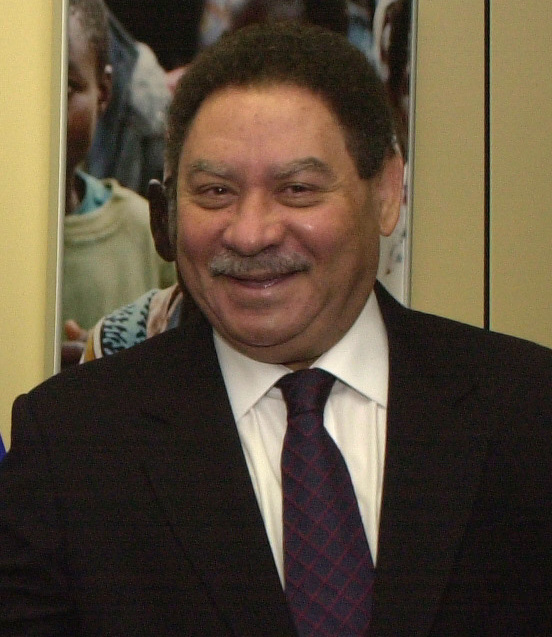

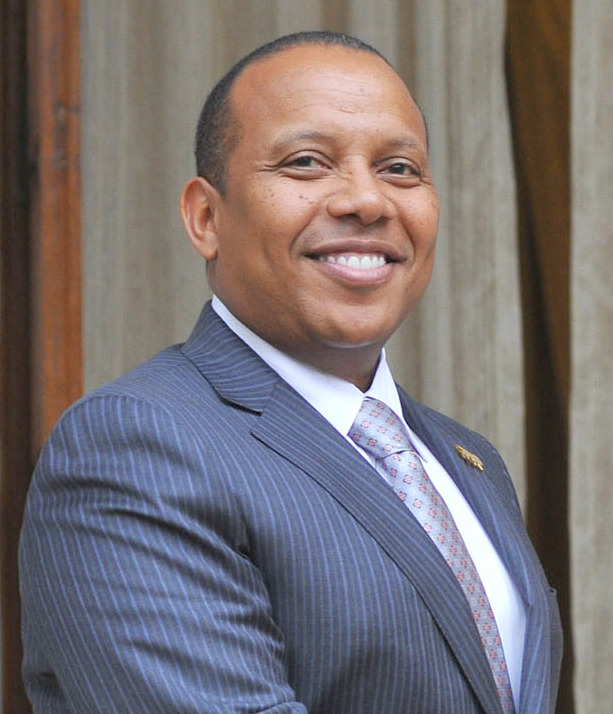
Candidate	Fradique de Menezes	Patrice Trovoada
Party	MDFM – PL	ADI
Popular vote	34,859	22,339
Percentage	60.58%	38.82%
- Results by district
President before election
Fradique de Menezes
MDFM – PL
Elected President
Fradique de Menezes
MDFM – PL

Presidential elections were held in São Tomé and Príncipe on 30 July 2006. Incumbent Fradique de Menezes, first elected in 2001, won with more than 60% of the vote, while his main challenger, Patrice Trovoada, son of a former president received just over 38%. The third candidate, Nilo Guimarães, received less than 1% of the vote.

== Campaign ==
Fradique de Menezes was nominated by the Force for Change Democratic Movement – Liberal Party and supported by the Christian Democratic Front and Social Liberal Party. Patrice Trovoada was nominated by the Independent Democratic Action, but also supported by the Democratic Renovation Party, the MLSTP/PSD, the National Union for Democracy and Progress, the Opposition Democratic Coalition, the Social Renewal Party, the São Toméan Workers Party, the Social Renewal Party and the Union of Democrats for Citizenship and Development.

== Results ==
Candidate	Party	Votes	%
Fradique de Menezes	Force for Change Democratic Movement – Liberal Party	34,859	60.58
Patrice Trovoada	Independent Democratic Action	22,339	38.82
Nilo Guimarães	Independent	342	0.59
Total		57,540	100.00
Valid votes		57,540	97.23
Invalid/blank votes		1,638	2.77
Total votes		59,178	100.00
Registered voters/turnout		91,119	64.95
Source: African Election Database
