= 1988 São Tomé and Príncipe coup attempt =

Failed coup attempt

Date	8 March 1988
Location	São Tomé, São Tomé and Príncipe
Result	Coup attempt suppressed

Belligerents
Government of São Tomé and Príncipe: Armed Forces	Frente de Resistência Nacional de São Tomé and Príncipe – Renovada (FRNSTP-R)

Commanders and leaders
Manuel Pinto da Costa	Afonso dos Santos

Casualties and losses
1 wounded	3 dead

The 1988 São Tomé and Príncipe coup attempt was a failed paramilitary operation undertaken by the exile National Resistance Front of São Tomé and Príncipe – Renewal (Portuguese: Frente de Resistência Nacional de São Tomé and Príncipe – Renovada FRNSTP-R) that sought to overthrow the ruling MLSTP government.

Launched on 8 March with the arrival of 44 mostly unarmed personnel on the island of São Tomé via small boats, the attempted coup was quickly suppressed, with three of the putschists being killed and one policeman wounded. Afonso dos Santos, leader of the FRNSTP-R, who was captured during the attempt, was subsequently tried, convicted and sentenced to 22 years in prison in 1989, along with 38 co-defendants who received terms ranging from two to 21 years. However, following the end of single party rule in 1990, President Pinto da Costa granted an amnesty to those convicted.

The coup attempt has been described as an "amazingly amateurish operation".

== Background ==
The National Resistance Front of São Tomé and Príncipe (FRNSTP) was formed in 1981 as armed exile movement based in Gabon that sought the overthrow of the MLSTP government. As a result of political liberalisations from the mid-1980s onwards, relations with the government of Gabon improved and the leadership of the FRNSTP abandoned armed struggle.

== Coup attempt ==
Arriving between 3 am and 4 am at four beaches, the group attacked the main police barracks. They had then planned to attack the Presidential Palace, execute Pinto da Costa and declare dos Santos as president. They had brought posters stating "Down with Pinto da Costa" and "Viva President Afsonso dos Santos" as well as documents proclaiming a new president and a resignation speech for Pinto da Costa.

== Legacy ==
In December 1990, months after a new constitution permitting multiparty politics was approved, former FRNSTP-R members founded the Christian Democratic Front (FDC) party.

== See also ==
- History of São Tomé and Príncipe
- 1995 São Tomé and Príncipe coup attempt
- 2003 São Tomé and Príncipe coup attempt
- 2022 São Tomé and Príncipe coup attempt
