= 2022 São Tomé and Príncipe coup attempt =

Failed coup in Central Africa

Date	24–25 November 2022
Location	São Tomé, São Tomé and Príncipe
Result	Government victory

Belligerents
Government of São Tomé and Príncipe: Armed Forces	4 citizens 12 soldiers Fighters from Buffalo Battalion

Commanders and leaders
Patrice Trovoada	Arlecio Costa †

Casualties and losses
None	4 dead

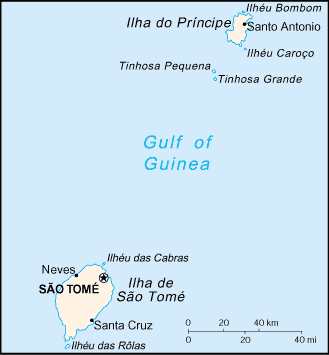
A CIA WFB map of São Tomé and Príncipe

The 2022 São Tomé and Príncipe coup attempt was an attempted coup d'état that is reported to have taken place on the island nation of São Tomé and Príncipe overnight on 24–25 November 2022.

At a press conference held on 25 November, the nation's prime minister, Patrice Trovoada, said that the country's armed forces headquarters had come under attack from four men, including Delfim Neves (who was later exonerated and released), president of the outgoing National Assembly, and Arlecio Costa, a military officer who had attempted a previous coup in 2003. The attempted coup was thwarted by the government, and its perpetrators were described as being under arrest.

Four people were killed in a gunfight, and 12 active soldiers were involved. Trovoada also suggested fighters from the officially disbanded South African group Buffalo Battalion were involved, and that Costa, one of their mercenaries who was killed in the fighting, was one of the ringleaders.

The coup leaders said they had tried to overthrow the government due to poverty in the country.

In a Deutsche Welle interview on 6 December, outgoing prime minister Jorge Bom Jesus labelled the event as an "invention" that the new government would use as a pretext to crack down on opposition parties.

== See also ==
- History of São Tomé and Príncipe
- 1988 São Tomé and Príncipe coup attempt
- 1995 São Tomé and Príncipe coup d'état
- 2003 São Tomé and Príncipe coup d'état
