= Social Renewal Party =

Social Renewal Party can refer to:

- Social Renewal Party (Angola)
- Social Renewal Party (Guinea-Bissau)
- Social Renewal Party (São Tomé and Príncipe)
