= Tomé Vera Cruz =

Prime Minister of São Tomé and Principe from 2006 to 2008

Tomé Soares da Vera Cruz
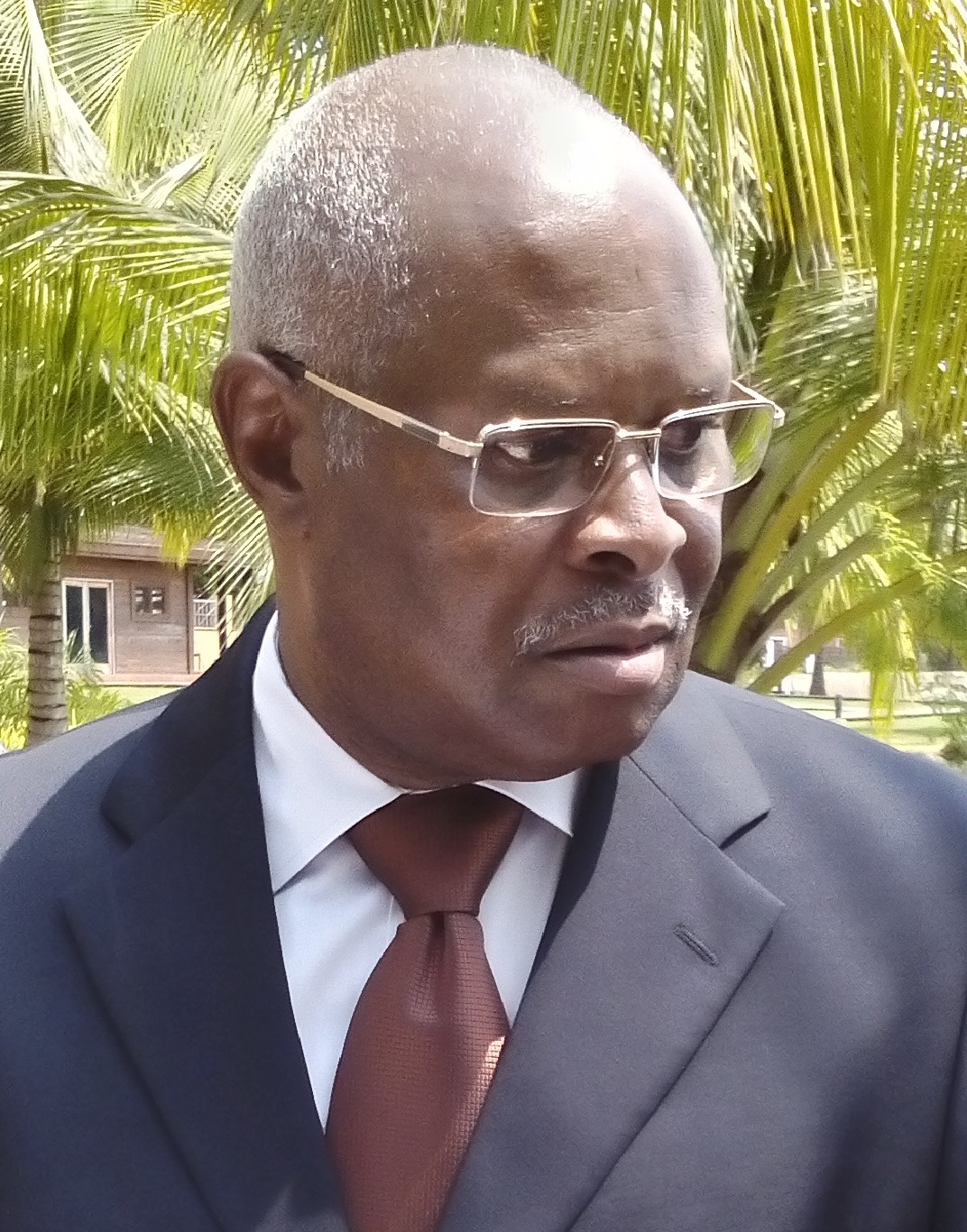

14th Prime Minister of São Tomé and Príncipe
- In office 21 April 2006 – 14 February 2008
- President: Fradique de Menezes
- Preceded by: Maria do Carmo Silveira
- Succeeded by: Patrice Trovoada

Personal details
- Born: 23 July 1956 (age 70) Overseas Province of São Tomé and Príncipe, Portugal
- Party: MDFM-PL

Tomé Soares da Vera Cruz (born 23 July 1956) was the 14th prime minister of São Tomé and Príncipe from April 2006 to February 2008. He is also Secretary-General of the Force for Change Democratic Movement-Liberal Party (MDFM-PL). In addition to becoming prime minister, he became minister of information and regional integration.

== Biography ==
He attended the National Lyceum in São Tomé and finished in 1975, when the nation became independent. In 1983, he attended at the Politehnica University of Timișoara in Romania and was trained as an electrical engineer.

Vera Cruz served as director general of the Water and Electricity Company (Empresa de Água e Electricidade), he later served as minister of natural resources in an MLSTP-led government from 9 August 2003 to 5 March 2004.

His party, in a coalition with the Democratic Convergence Party (PCD), won the largest number of seats (23) in legislative elections held on 26 March 2006. Vera Cruz then became prime minister on 21 April 2006.

He visited Angola for three days beginning on October 24, 2007 to discuss bilateral cooperation and the strengthening of historic and cultural ties.

Vera Cruz announced his resignation on February 7, 2008 and was succeeded by Patrice Trovoada on February 14.

Between March 2008 and September 2010, he was deputy of the Parliamentary Bench of his party, he was effective member of the 2nd Specialized Parliamentary Committee.

He was a candidate for a president in the 2016 elections, he later declined that option.

Preceded by Maria do Carmo Silveira	Prime Minister of São Tomé and Príncipe; 2006 – 2008	Succeeded by Patrice Trovoada
