= Nilo Guimarães =

São Tomé and Príncipe politician

Nilo de Oliveira Guimarães (born 30 September 1954) is a São Toméan businessman and politician.

Running as an independent candidate in the 30 July 2006 presidential election, he finished last out of three candidates, winning 0.59% of the vote.
