= Liberal Democratic Order =

Political party in São Tomé and Príncipe

Liberal Democratic Order Ordem Liberal Democrata
- Founded: 2014
- Ideology: Liberalism; Representative democracy

The Liberal Democratic Order (Ordem Liberal Democrata, or OLD) is a São Toméan political party, officially founded after the 2014 general elections, in São Tomé, by a group of citizens outraged by what they regard as the cyclical political crisis in the country and the current inability of the ruling class to manage public affairs in a transparent, orderly and productive manner.

The OLD seeks to uphold the rule of law and representative democracy, and struggles to build a more just, united and prosperous society through the promotion of the Nation, Order, and Excellence as fundamental pillars of the State.
