= Manuel Quintas de Almeida =

São Toméan coup leader (d. 2006)

- Born: 1957; São Tomé and Príncipe, Portuguese Empire
- Died: 26 December 2006 (aged 49); Portugal
- Military career
- Allegiance: São Tomé and Príncipe
- Branch: Army, coast guard, presidential guard
- Rank: Captain
- Known for: Leading the 1995 São Tomé and Príncipe coup d'état

Manuel Quintas de Almeida (1957 – 26 December 2006) was a São Toméan soldier known for leading the 1995 São Tomé and Príncipe coup d'état. At the time of the coup, he was a second lieutenant in the armed forces of São Tomé and Príncipe. He later served as the captain of artillery in the armed forces and a commissioner of the military police.

== Biography ==
Quintas de Almeida was a member of the Movement for the Liberation of São Tomé and Príncipe (MLSTP), specifically its youth wing, in the 1970s. He received political education from the party's politburo and became a member of the presidential guard for president Manuel Pinto da Costa. He was trained in surface artillery at the Escola Comandante Benedito (Commander Benedito School) in Luanda, Angola, in 1978. At the time of the coup he was a second lieutenant and second-in-command of the São Toméan coast guard.

Angered by the poor condition of the armed forces, Quintas de Almeida and fellow second lieutenant Fernando Sousa Pontes launched the country's first military coup on 15 August 1995, overthrowing the democratically elected government of president Miguel Trovoada. However, Quintas de Almeida and his coconspirators agreed to return power to the civilian government on 22 August after negotiations mediated by Angola.

After the coup, Quintas de Almeida became a commissioner of the military police and later served as the captain of artillery in the armed forces. He died suddenly at the age of 49 on 26 December 2006 in Portugal, where he was receiving treatment for injuries sustained in a car accident.
