= Celmira Sacramento =

São Toméan politician

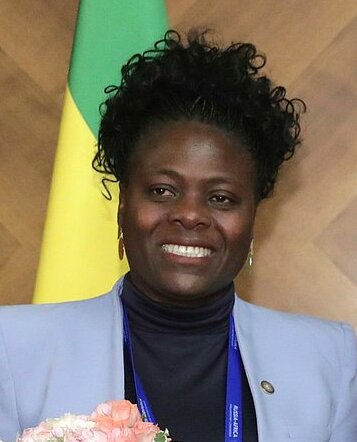
- Sacramento in 2023

President of the National Assembly of São Tomé and Príncipe
- In office 8 November 2022 – February 2026
- President: Carlos Vila Nova
- Preceded by: Delfim Neves
- Succeeded by: Abnildo do Nascimento d'Oliveira

Personal details
- Born: 1975 (age 50–51)
- Party: Independent Democratic Action (ADI)
- Occupation: Politician

Celmira de Almeida do Sacramento dos Santos Lourenço (born 1975) is a Santomean politician who was speaker of the National Assembly from November 2022 to February 2026.

== Education ==
Sacramento has a degree in biology.

== Career ==
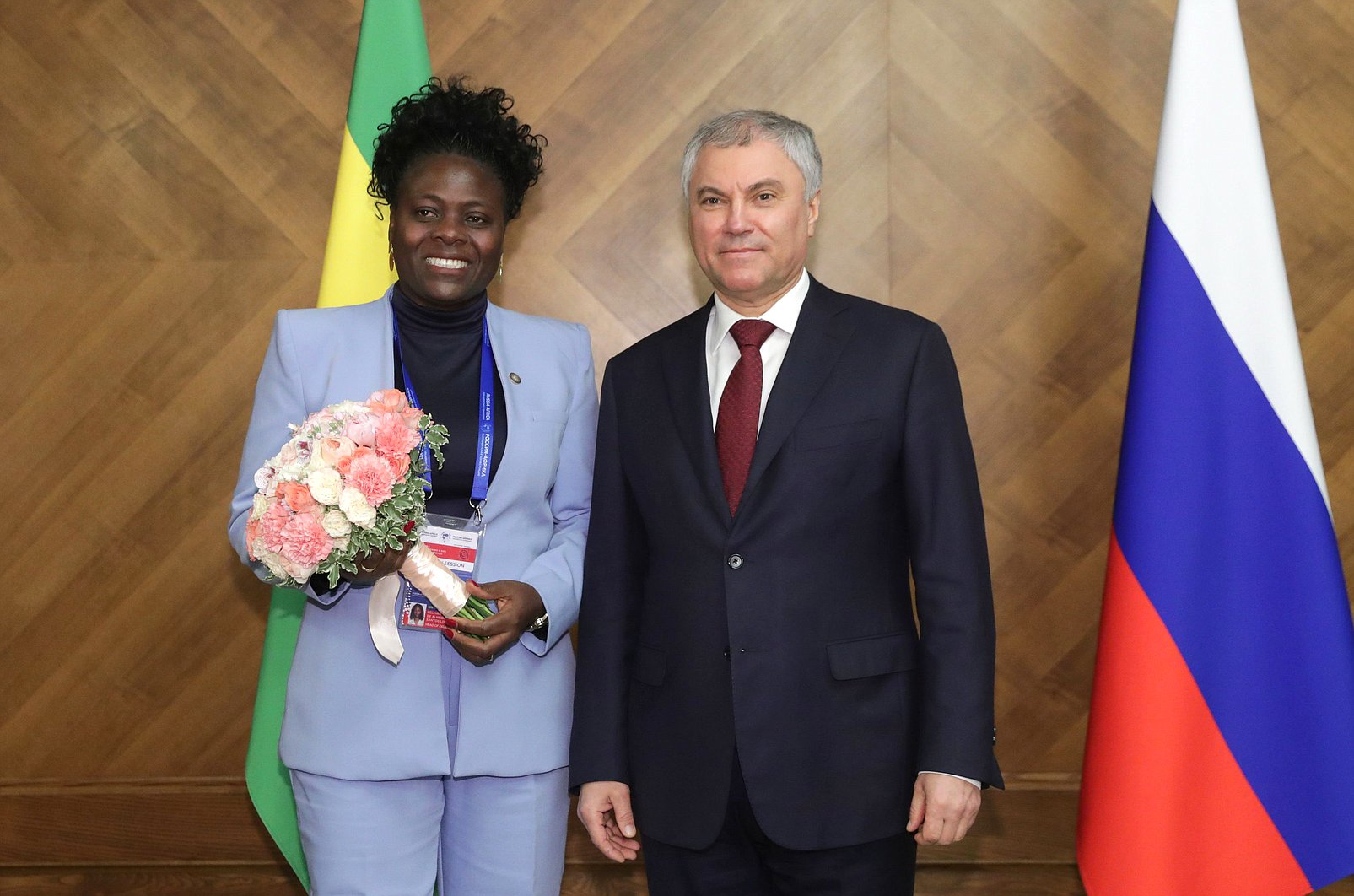
Sacramento with Vladimir Putin's close associate Vyacheslav Volodin in Moscow, Russia, 20 March 2023

Sacramento was elected to the National Assembly as the member for the Mé-Zóchi District in 2010, and subsequently selected in 2014, 2018, and 2022. From 2014 to 2018, she was president of the Network of Women Parliamentarians, and from 2018 to 2022 she led the third commission of the CPLP parliamentary assembly. After the 2022 election, she was one of eight women elected to the 55 member parliament. She was part of a group that lobbied for the approval of a parity law that came into effect on 19 November 2022, with a target of 40% women set for the next election.

Sacramento was elected vice president of the Independent Democratic Action party in October 2020, under president Patrice Trovoada. The party won the 2022 legislative elections, with Trovoada elected Prime Minister.

Sacramento was elected president of the National Assembly on 8 November 2022 with 52 votes in favour and three abstentions. She is the second woman to hold the role after poet Alda Neves da Graça do Espírito Santo (1980-1991), and the first democratically elected to the role. Upon her election, she said a key challenge of her mandate was the "consensual revision of the Constitution" in order to reform the Assembly.

She was dismissed by the National Assembly in 2026, in the midst of a parliamentary crisis, after the formation of a new government supported only by a minority of the ADI by the president. This branch of the ADI benefits from the support of the former opposition. She was succeeded by Abnildo do Nascimento d'Oliveira.
