= Claudio Corallo =

Italian businessman and agricultural engineer

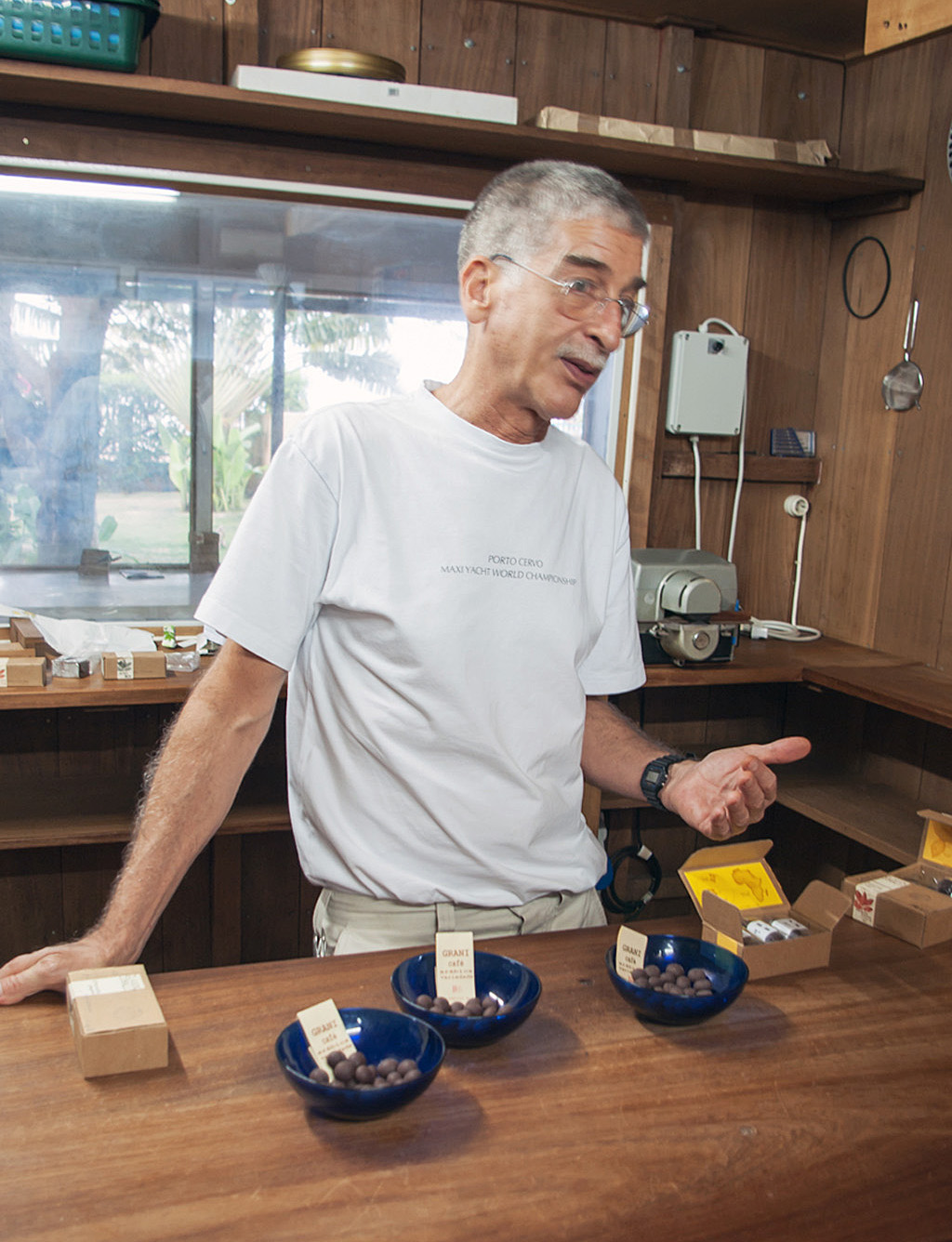
- Corallo in 2012
- Born: 1951 (age 73–74); Florence, Italy
- Occupation(s): Businessman, Agricultural engineer

Claudio Corallo (born 1951) is an Italian businessman and an agricultural engineer. He resides in São Tomé and Príncipe. He created the chocolate and coffee refinery called "Claudio Corallo Cacao and Coffee".

== Early life ==
Corallo was born in the city of Florence, Italy. He trained as an agricultural engineer in 1974 at the Instituto Agronómico para o Ultramar (Institute for Overseas Agronomy).

== Career ==
He worked as a diver for a dredging company in Trieste and later for an Italian consulting company. In 1974, he went to what was now the Democratic Republic of the Congo (DRC); the government of Mobutu Sese Seko contracted him as an investigator and he offered technical assistance with small rural producers. He later bought 1,250 hectares of coffee plantations in the Lomela region. The region was difficult to access from Kinshasa, capital of today's DRC, using the Congo River as the only means of access. Claudio used a canoe that took two weeks to reach Lomela, but planned to build a boat, which he named the DB,1 to reduce travel time. With political changes in Zaire, he was forced to leave the country.

In December 1992, he moved to São Tomé and Príncipe where he started to cultivate cocoa, which was already under cultivation in the archipelago. Research about the varieties of cocoa, including its productions in Bolivia, confirmed that cocoa in São Tomé and Príncipe had a different quality. Through various tests he found that the bitterness was caused by processing failures, moisture storage and the country's equatorial heat. Different forms of tests of fermentation for a new cocoa paste were developed and he built a lab for roasting, peeling and rinding.

He then bought an abandoned cocoa plantation of 120 hectares (300 acres) in Terreiro Velho (Old Farm) next to Nova Estrela on the island of Príncipe. He produced a product with high quality that was considered the world's best chocolate. He controlled the production process from tree to table.

Corallo discovered that the island of São Tomé was able to produce coffee of high quality. He proceeded to buy property in Nova Moca southwest of Monte Café, the coffee-producing area. He developed its coffee and chocolate crops and built a refined gastronomy industry, Claudio Corallo Cacao & Coffee.

Corallo taught classes in agrarian science courses at the Higher Polytechnic Institute (Instituto Superior Politécnico de São Tomé e Príncipe (ISP)) which became a campus of the University of São Tomé and Príncipe (USTP) and at the (Centro de Aperfeiçoamento Técnico Agropecuário (CATAP)) (now the Center for Studies for Development, also a campus of the University.)
