= University of São Tomé and Príncipe =

Public institution of higher education in São Tomé and Príncipe

- Universidade de São Tomé e Príncipe
- Type: Public
- Established: 2014; 12 years ago
- Rector: Ayres Bruzaca de Menezes
- Students: 2,000
- Location: Quinta de Santo António, CP 546, São Tomé, São Tomé and Príncipe; 0.326°N 6.73°E
- Website: www.ustp-edu-st.com

The University of São Tomé and Príncipe (Portuguese: Universidade de São Tomé e Príncipe), USTP, is a public institution of higher education in São Tomé and Príncipe. It is the country's main institution dedicated to teaching, research, and university extension. It was established in 2014 by merging three older institutions of higher education: ISP (Instituto Superior Politécnico de São Tomé e Príncipe, also ISPSTP), EFOPE (Escola de Formação de Professores e Educadores) and ICS (Instituto de Ciências de Saúde).

== History ==
The polytechnic school ISP was founded in 1996 through Decree 88, under the name "Higher Polytechnic Institute of São Tomé and Príncipe" (ISPSTP, in Portuguese); it began operations in the academic year 1997/1998. Under the auspices of the Ministry of Education and Culture, ISPSTP started its activities with three-year baccalaureate courses aimed at training secondary school teachers in the areas of Portuguese, French, Mathematics, Biology and History. Other baccalaureate courses were created later.

The predecessor of the medical school ICS, Escola de Formação dos Quadros da Saúde Dr. Victor Sá Machado, was established in 2003 with financial support from the Calouste Gulbenkian Foundation and was inaugurated in October 2003. In 2014 it was renamed Instituto Superior de Ciências da Saúde Victor Sá Machado.

On July 24, 2014, the government of São Tomé and Príncipe decided to establish the "São Tomé and Príncipe Public University" (UPSTP). For that, they converted the ISPSTP (transforming it into an organic institution), creating instead the first public university of the archipelago. At the installation ceremony, the Minister of Education, Culture and Formation, Jorge Lopes Bom Jesus, installed the university professor Peregrino do Sacramento da Costa as the Rector of the new university.

Two Brazilian institutions have supported the project since its inception in 2012: the University for International Integration of the Afro-Brazilian Lusophony (Unilab) and the Federal University of Minas Gerais (UFMG). Both universities and the Brazilian Ministry of Education assist the institution until its final consolidation. In September 2015, the creation of a German course was announced at the UPSTP with the support of the Goethe Institute and the German Academic Exchange Service, in collaboration with the University of Münster. In 2016, the university changed its name to "Universidade de São Tomé e Príncipe" (USTP). On July 28, 2016, the new rector, Professor Ayres Bruzaca de Menezes, took office.

== Departments and courses ==
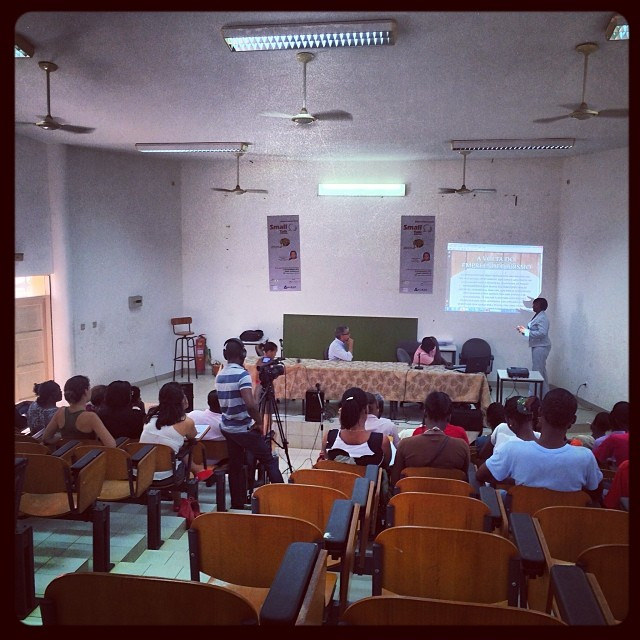
Mini-conference by ISP during the Smart Talk Event in 2014 with the speakers Cláudio Corallo and Hilária Teixeira.

The University of São Tomé and Príncipe covers the following scientific areas:

- Sciences of Nature, Life and Environment
- Human and Social Sciences and Arts
- Exact Sciences and Engineering
- Economic and Political Sciences and Law

It offers the following courses:

Human and Social Sciences and Arts, Exact Sciences and Engineering

- Licentiate in Biology
- Licentiate in Mathematics
- Licentiate in Agronomy
- Licentiate in Physics
- Licentiate in Business Administration
- Licentiate in Public Relations and Communications
- Licentiate in Economics
- Licentiate in Hotel Management
- Licentiate in Computer Engineering
- Licentiate in Electronic Engineering and Telecommunications
- Licentiate in Systems and Information Technology
- Licentiate in the Portuguese language
- Licentiate in History
- Licentiate in the French language
- Licentiate in Geography
- Licentiate in Law

Health Sciences

- Licentiate in management administration in health services
- Bachelor in Nursing
- Bachelor in Clinical Analysis
- Bachelor in Anesthesia
- Complement on the secondary education in pharmacy
- Middle courses on nursing
- Middle courses on maternal and child health
- Specialization in surgical instrumentation

Education

- Licentiate in Primary Education, Initial Training
- Complement of Licentiate in Primary Education
- Bachelor in Primary Education
- Bachelor in Children's Education

== Notable alums and professors ==
- Claudio Corallo – former professor, agronomical engineer and businessman
- Guadalupe de Ceita (alumnus of the former School of Nursing) – medic and politician
- Jorge Bom Jesus (alumnus and former professor) – linguist and politician.
- Ângela Viegas Santiago was a Minister of Finance before she worked here.

== Rectors ==
Name	Term	Campus	Election form
Peregrino do Sacramento da Costa	July 24, 2014 – July 28, 2016	Higher Polytechnical Institute	Ministerial decision
Ayres Bruzaca de Menezes	since July 28, 2016	Higher Polytechnical Institute	Ministerial decision
