= New Way Movement =

Political party in São Tomé and Príncipe

The New Way Movement (Portuguese: Movimento Novo Rumo) is a newly formed political party in São Tomé and Príncipe.

In legislative elections held on 26 March 2006, the party won a single seat on the island of Príncipe.
