= Ue-Kedadji =

Electoral coalition

Uê-Kédadji (English: Daylight) was an electoral coalition in São Tomé and Príncipe.

== Member parties ==
- Democratic Renovation Party
- National Union for Democracy and Progress
- Opposition Democratic Coalition
- People's Party of Progress
- Social Renewal Party – joined in early 2006.

The Independent Democratic Action (ADI) party, which was part of the coalition in the 2002 election, left and decided to contest the 2006 election independently.

== 2002 election ==
In the legislative election held on 3 March 2002, Uê-Kédadji won 16.2% of the vote and 8 of 55 seats in the National Assembly.

== 2006 election ==
Prior to the 2006 legislative election held on 26 March, the Independent Democratic Action (ADI) party - the coalition's most successful constituent party - broke with Uê-Kédadji to contest the election independently.

Despite Uê-Kédadji's leader at the time, Neves e Silva, expressing his beliefs that the coalition remained in a position to attain parliamentary representation without ADI, Uê-Kédadji only obtained 1.03% of the popular vote and won no seats in the 2006 election, while ADI independently secured 11 seats.

== Post-2006 ==
Uê-Kédadji has not taken part in any legislative election since 2006 as a unified coalition.

Some constituent parties (namely the Opposition Democratic Coalition and National Union for Democracy and Progress) stood independently in elections up to 2014, but failed to win any seats, while the remaining parties faded out of São Toméan politics altogether following 2006.
