= National Resistance Front of São Tomé and Príncipe =

Political party in São Tomé and Príncipe

The National Resistance Front of São Tomé and Príncipe (FRNSTP) was a political party founded in 1981 by São Toméan exiles who opposed the socialist policies of the single party Movement for the Liberation of São Tomé and Príncipe (MLSTP) government, and sought its overthrow.

Based in Gabon under the leadership of Carlos da Graça, the movement was expelled from the country in 1986 as relations between Gabon and São Tomé improved. Carlos da Graça ceased to be a member and remained in Gabon, before returning to São Tomé and becoming foreign minister. The major part of the FRNSTP moved to Lisbon, Portugal, formed a coalition with the Independent Democratic Union of São Tomé and Príncipe (UDISTP), and agreed to seek political changes by non-violent means.

A small faction of the FRNSTP, led by Monso dos Santos, refused to give up the idea of armed struggle as a means of overthrowing the São Tomé government and moved to Cameroon, taking the name of National Resistance Front of São Tomé and Príncipe-Renewal (FRNSTP-R) in 1986. They refused to give up the idea of armed struggle as a means of overthrowing the São Toméan government. The FRNSTP-R was based Kribi, Cameroon under the leadership of Monso dos Santos.

A failed invasion to overthrow the government in 1988 led to the capture and sentencing of the organisation's membership. In 1990, members of the FRNSTP-R were pardoned and founded the Christian Democratic Front.
