= 1995 São Tomé and Príncipe coup d'état =

Military coup in Central Africa

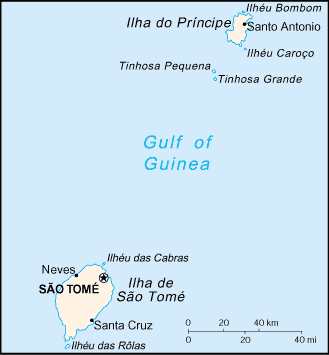
- Map of São Tomé and Príncipe
Date	15–22 August 1995
Location	São Tomé and Príncipe
Result	The military agrees to restore civilian rule after receiving several concessions.

Belligerents
Government of São Tomé and Príncipe	Junta of National Salvation

Commanders and leaders
Miguel Trovoada; Carlos Graça	Manuel Quintas de Almeida; Fernando Sousa Pontes

Units involved
Presidential guards	Armed forces

Casualties and losses
1 guard killed	1 soldier killed in an accident

On 15 August 1995, the armed forces of São Tomé and Príncipe, led by second lieutenants Manuel Quintas de Almeida and Fernando Sousa Pontes, launched a coup d'état against the country's government, led by President Miguel Trovoada and Prime Minister Carlos Graça. Several government officials, including Trovoada and Graça, were detained by the military, and Quintas de Almeida declared a Junta of National Salvation. It was the first military coup in the country's history.

The coup leaders were motivated by the poor condition of the military, which had been underfunded since São Tomé and Príncipe's liberalisation and transition towards democracy in 1990–1991. Angola, a key ally of São Tomé and Príncipe, acted as a mediator between the two sides during negotiations. The military handed power back to the civilian government after receiving several concessions regarding the structure of the armed forces and government involvement in military affairs.

== Background ==
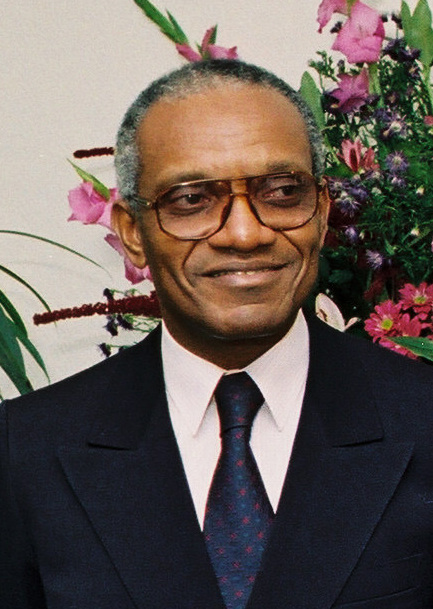
Miguel Trovoada in 1995

Miguel Trovoada became the first democratically elected president of São Tomé and Príncipe in 1991. The country had been under the one-party rule of the Movement for the Liberation of São Tomé and Príncipe (MLSTP) since its independence from Portugal in 1975. Trovoada was himself a former leader of the MLSTP, but he fled into exile in 1981 after falling out of favour with then president Manuel Pinto da Costa. He returned in time to contest the 1991 presidential election and was elected unopposed. He later founded the Independent Democratic Action (ADI) political party in 1994.

Tensions between the São Toméan government and military had been growing since the country's democratic transition in 1990–1991. Funding for the military declined after the transition period, and in 1992 local papers began publishing articles questioning the necessity of the army. Trovoada announced in October of that year that three commissions had been looking into reforming the military as a whole. Reforms to the military from 1992 to 1995 were slow and marred by disagreements between the Trovoada government and military leadership, often culminating in threats by the latter. For example, the army threatened to start a rebellion on 31 January 1993 if their demands for better working conditions and increased pay were not met. The Trovoada government offered a 40 percent pay increase across the board but was met with rejection by the military leadership, which had asked for a 300 percent increase.

The São Toméan military was in a difficult state by the time of the 1995 coup. Soldiers had not been paid for six months, with the monthly salary of a second lieutenant (the lowest junior officer rank) being only 24,000 São Toméan dobras, or about 14 US dollars. The army was ill-equipped with only two armoured vehicles, and many young men ignored their calls for compulsory military service. Trovoada was unpopular among the military rank and file, and the two leaders of the 1995 coup, second lieutenants Manuel Quintas de Almeida and Fernando Sousa Pontes, blamed him for the poor conditions. While there had been coup attempts in São Tomé and Príncipe before 1995, the military had until then kept itself outside of the country's politics. Quintas de Almeida, then second-in-command of the coast guard, and Sousa Pontes, then in charge of the mortar battery on São Tomé Island, later claimed that 90 percent of the military had been involved in the coup, but senior officers were not among the participants. Unlike their younger, lower-ranked counterparts, senior officers had benefited somewhat from their positions, and many were on unpaid leave so that they could engage in small businesses.

== Events ==
=== Detainment of government officials ===
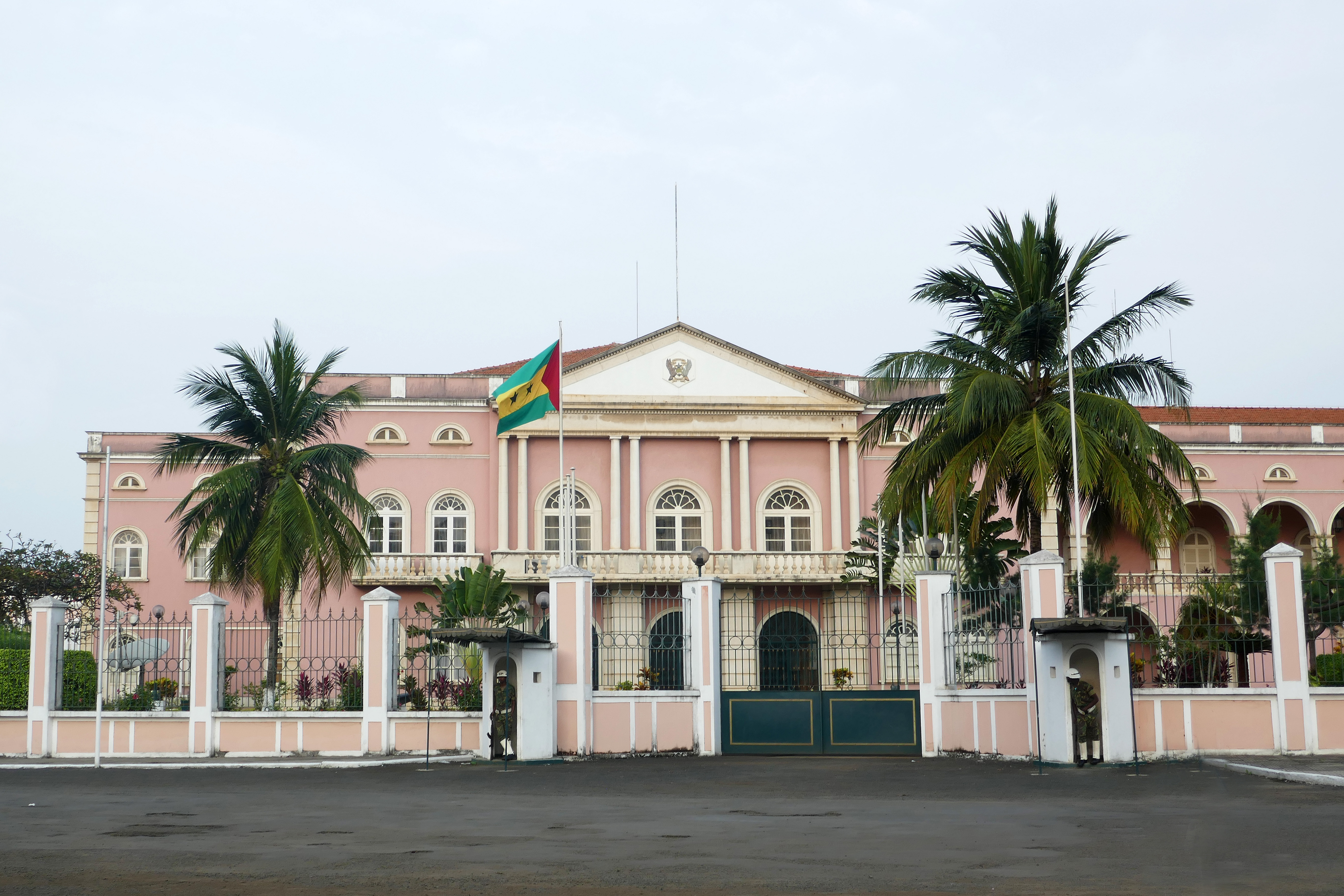
The Presidential Palace in 2019

Forty young military recruits under the command of Sousa Pontes departed their barracks and made their way to the Presidential Palace in the early morning hours of 15 August 1995. After their arrival, all but one of the presidential guards surrendered; his resistance led to his death at the hands of the rebel soldiers. After a failed two-hour search for Trovoada, Sousa Pontes forced Trovoada's wife to call the president and threatened to kill his family if he did not surrender. Trovoada subsequently emerged from hiding, still in his pajamas and nightgown, and was taken to the barracks of the rebels, where he was guarded by a 600-strong army.

After the president's capture, Quintas de Almeida announced via radio at 8 am the establishment of a military junta – the Junta of National Salvation. A second radio communiqué at 1 pm imposed an 8 pm curfew, closed the country's borders until further notice, prohibited communications with the press without the military's approval, and assured the safety of diplomatic missions. Three state-run banks were temporarily closed to avoid the flight of foreign currency, while other institutions were ordered to carry on business as usual. However, markets remained closed for the rest of the day and the scheduled flight from Lisbon, Portugal, did not arrive.

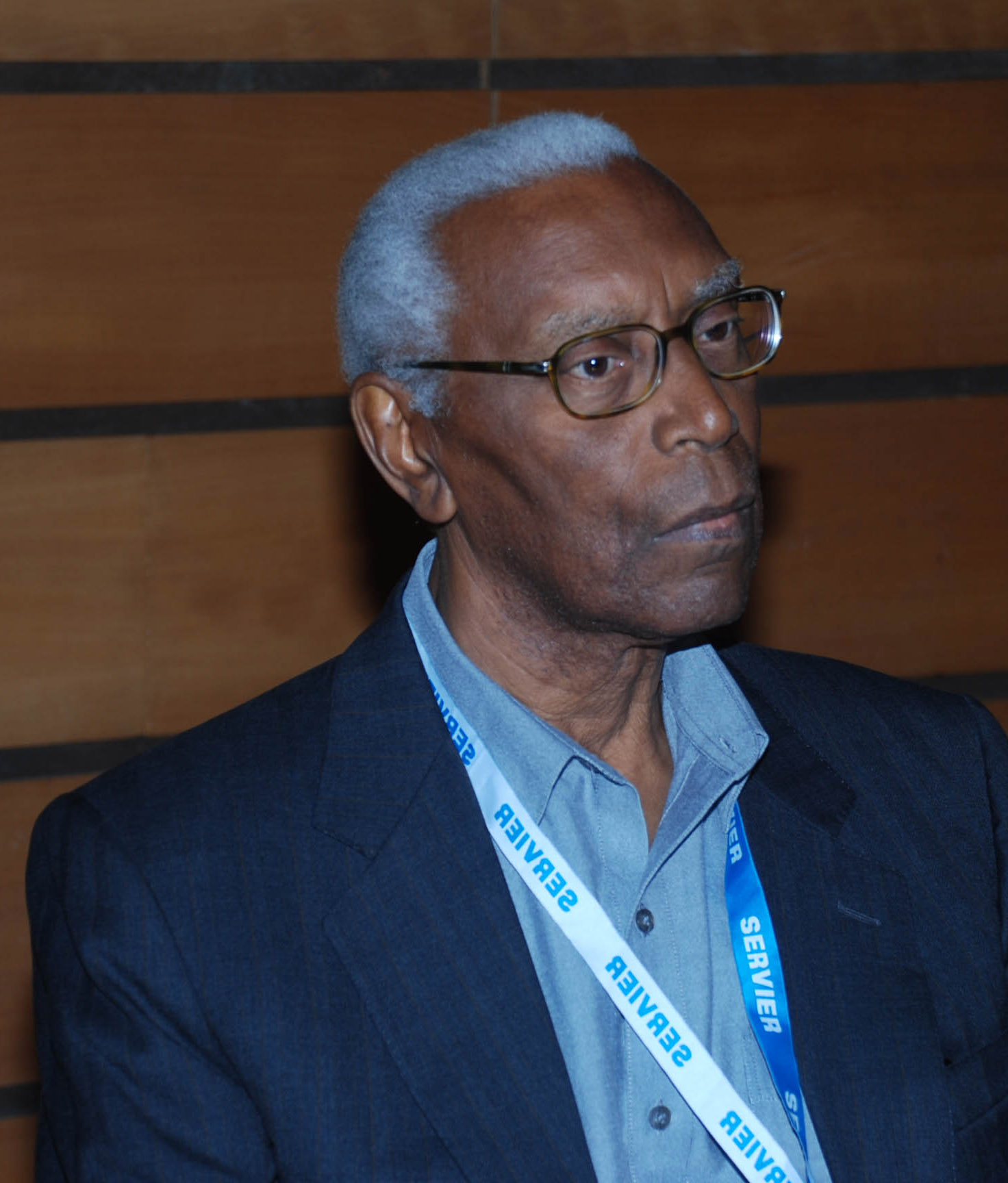
Carlos Graça in 2013

Meanwhile, soldiers commanded by Quintas de Almeida rounded up and detained other government officials. Prime minister Carlos Graça was flown back by the military to São Tomé from Príncipe, where he had been attending the annual feast of Saint Lawrence, and was immediately placed under house arrest. António Taty da Costa, the head of the immigration department, was brought to the rebels' barracks alongside Alfredo Marçal Lima, the military's head of public relations and cooperation. It became evident that the coup was the initiative of junior officers and not the military leadership. Other ministers and their families sought refuge in the Portuguese embassy. However, the junta unexpectedly allowed the ministers to continue working in their offices and did not occupy any state institution aside from the three banks.

=== International reactions and backtracking by the military ===
The coup took both São Toméans and international observers by surprise and elicited strong condemnation from São Tomé and Príncipe's allies. Portugal, France, Angola, Cape Verde, Guinea-Bissau, Mozambique, Gabon, South Africa, the United States, the European Union, and the United Nations all immediately released statements denouncing the coup and calling for the restoration of the civilian government. Some of these countries, who were major financial donors to São Tomé and Príncipe, threatened to suspend their aid. Angolan president José Eduardo dos Santos threatened to cut off his country's oil supplies, but he also offered to mediate between the two sides. Gabonese president Omar Bongo meanwhile proposed a military intervention by the international community similar to Operation Uphold Democracy, which ousted the military dictatorship in Haiti in 1994. France supported Bongo's proposal, but he later changed his mind and offered to mediate instead.

Under international pressure, Quintas de Almeida moderated the coup's objectives, suspending the junta and calling for a government of national unity to be formed. In a press conference held on 16 August, he insisted that the military did not aim to seize power, with Sousa Pontes adding that political parties would not be dissolved. Graça was released from house arrest that day, and the coup leaders met with representatives of São Tomé and Príncipe's three major political parties – the MLSTP, ADI, and the Democratic Convergence Party (PCD-GR) – to negotiate the country's future. The coup leaders proposed forming a government of national unity for three to twelve months, immediately after which early elections would be held. All three parties rejected the proposal and demanded that the civilian government be restored. Trovoada refused to participate in any government involving the military, while Graça, who had previously advocated a government of national unity, said he was ready to participate in such a government if it was led by him and his party. Finding themselves at an impasse, both sides accepted mediation by Angola.

=== De-escalation, negotiations, and end ===
The military gradually undid the restrictions it had imposed on the first day of the coup. Quintas de Almeida announced on 17 August that the military would depart the banks it had occupied, lift the evening curfew, and reopen the country's airspace. He reiterated his claim that the military did not seek to overthrow the government but sought an end to political conflict and corruption. He denounced the living conditions in the country, particularly of the soldiers, whom he described as living like "beggars", and invited donor countries to visit São Tomé and Príncipe to see the situation for themselves. On 18 August, Trovoada, who had been on a hunger strike to force his release, was permitted to receive visitors and make phone calls. However, he was still confined to the barracks and forbidden from making any public announcements. A five-member delegation from Angola led by foreign minister Venâncio da Silva Moura arrived in São Tomé and Príncipe that day, and Da Silva Moura was able to negotiate Trovoada's transfer to a government residence.

Quintas de Almeida set up and led a five-member military commission to negotiate with the Angolan mediators. The commission presented several key demands upon the Angolans' arrival: a general amnesty for everyone involved in the coup, a constitutional change that would remove the president's role as supreme commander of the armed forces, the appointment of the defence minister by the armed forces rather than the civilian government, the restructuring of the army and state bureaucracy, and the removal of corrupt government officials. During the next day of negotiations on 19 August, the military commission insisted on the first two demands, as the coup plotters had become increasingly isolated both domestically and internationally. Many politicians expressed apprehension towards a resolution which would free the rebels from punishment, but some, like foreign minister Guilherme Posser da Costa, expressed hope that they would not be punished. Although negotiations continued on 20 August, life on the islands had returned almost to normal, with the army withdrawing nearly all of its troops from the public eye, except a few who were guarding Trovoada.

Angolan-mediated negotiations concluded on 21 August, with the military agreeing to restore the civilian government in exchange for a blanket amnesty. The National Assembly unanimously approved the amnesty at 7:15 pm, and representatives from the military, the civilian government, and the Angolan delegation signed a memorandum of understanding the next day. The civilian agreement agreed to all of the military commission's demands, with Angola being given the responsibility of supervising the progress. Quintas de Almeida expressed his content with the outcome of the negotiations and announced that the rebellion was over, marking the end of the country's first military coup.

== Aftermath ==
Trovoada addressed the nation immediately after his release and return to the presidential palace. He denied the accusations levied against him by the military and denounced the coup as a conspiracy by those seeking to prevent his reelection in 1996. He drew parallels to his 1979–1981 imprisonment by Pinto da Costa, who, being Trovoada's main political rival at the time of the coup, denied any involvement.

Shortly after the coup ended, defence minister Alberto Paulino was replaced by Carlos Paquete Carneiro da Silva, a reserve captain who had left the army in 1982 for personal reasons and pursued a career in private business. Army commander António Paquete was succeeded by António Nascimento, who had previously led the national police, on 15 September. Lieutenant Justino Lima, one of the coup plotters, was appointed second-in-command of the army thanks to pressure from his fellow junior officers.

On 19 September, António Taty da Costa, the chief negotiator of the military commission, publicly accused Trovoada through an open letter of having prior knowledge of the coup and not preventing it because he believed the military's target would be Graça instead of him. Trovoada denied the accusations and domestic observers suspected it was a defensive move by Taty da Costa, as he feared dismissal by Trovoada and could claim the veracity of his accusations as the basis of his removal. An inquiry into Taty da Costa's claims by the civilian government was stopped by the military, which viewed it as an attack on one of their own and therefore the entire military.

The political parties of São Tomé and Príncipe aimed but failed to form a government of national unity within 30 days. Negotiations were marred by differing priorities and disagreements over key ministries, and the parties decided to abandon such efforts until after the 1996 presidential election. Even Graça gave up on such a government, despite having been a vocal supporter before and during the coup, and resigned as prime minister. The new ADI-dominated cabinet created after the 1996 presidential election, which Trovoada won, was criticised by the opposition (particularly the PCD-GR) and local press for its lavish spending, particularly the purchase of 18 brand-new Renault luxury vehicles for the government's use. The government's deadlock continued unresolved into the 21st century, leading to another military coup in 2003 that also ended with a blanket amnesty, a memorandum of understanding, and promises to improve the armed forces.

== See also ==
- History of São Tomé and Príncipe
- 2022 São Tomé and Príncipe coup attempt
