= Basta Movement =

Political party in São Tomé and Príncipe

Basta! Movement Movimento Basta!
- Leader: Salvador Ramos
- Founder: Salvador Ramos
- Founded: 7 June 2022
- Political position: Centre-right
- Colours: Turquoise
- Slogan: «New Horizon for Sustainable Development» (Portuguese: «Novo Horizonte para Desenvolvimento Sustentável»)
- National Assembly: 2 / 55

Website
- basta.st (archived)

The Basta Movement (Portuguese: Movimento Basta!) is a political party in São Tomé and Príncipe. The party was created on June 7, 2022. They ran in the 2022 São Tomé and Príncipe legislative elections and won a total of 6,874 votes, making the party the third largest in the country. During this election candidates from the Democratic Convergence Party (PCD) joined the movement and ran under its banner. The leader of the party is Salvador Ramos.
