= Social Liberal Party (São Tomé and Príncipe) =

Political party in São Tomé and Príncipe

Social Liberal Party Partido Liberal Social
- Founded: c. 2000s
- Ideology: Liberalism; Social liberalism
- Colors: Yellow

The Social Liberal Party (Portuguese: Partido Liberal Social) is a defunct political party in São Tomé and Príncipe. The party failed to win any seats in the National Assembly following elections held on 26 March 2006.

The party supported Fradique de Menezes in the 30 July 2006 presidential election. He was re-elected with 60.58% of the vote.

== Electoral performance ==
The Social Liberal Party only competed in the 2006 legislative election.

Election	Votes		Seats			Position	Ref
Election	No.	Share	No.	±	Share	Position	Ref
2006 (legislative)	413	0.79%	0 / 55	-	0%	8th	
