= Independent Democratic Union of São Tomé and Príncipe =

Political party in São Tomé and Príncipe

The Independent Democratic Union of São Tomé and Príncipe (UDISTP) was a political party formed by São Toméan exiles based in Portugal who opposed the socialist policies of the single party Movement for the Liberation of São Tomé and Príncipe (MLSTP) government.

In 1986, another São Toméan exiled opposition party, the National Resistance Front of São Tomé and Príncipe (FRNSTP) formed a coalition with the UDISTP after being expelled from Gabon and relocating to Portugal.

Both groups agreed to seek political changes in São Tomé and Príncipe by non-violent means.
