= Fernando Pereira (major) =

São Toméan army major

Acting President of São Tomé and Príncipe
- In office 16 July 2003 – 23 July 2003
- Preceded by: Fradique de Menezes
- Succeeded by: Fradique de Menezes

Personal details
- Party: Military Junta

Fernando "Cobo" Pereira is a major in the military of São Tomé and Príncipe and the former Acting President of São Tomé and Príncipe.

== Coup ==
He led a coup against the elected government of Fradique de Menezes on July 16, 2003, while the latter was out of the country. He relinquished power a week later as part of an agreement.

== Family ==
Pereira "is of mixed Cape Verdian and Angolan descent."

He is the father of ten children.

== See also ==
- Fradique de Menezes#Career
