= Democratic Renovation Party (São Tomé and Príncipe) =

Political party in São Tomé and Príncipe

The Democratic Renovation Party (Portuguese: Partido da Renovação Democrática) is a political party in São Tomé and Príncipe. At the last legislative elections, 3 March 2002, the party joined the Uê Kédadji alliance, that won 16.2% of the popular vote and 8 out of 55 seats. This alliance failed to win a seat in the 2006 elections.

The party supported Patrice Trovoada in the 30 July 2006 presidential election. He won 38.82% of the vote, finishing a distant second to the incumbent Fradique de Menezes, who received 60.58% of the vote.
