= Arlindo Vicente de Assunção Carvalho =

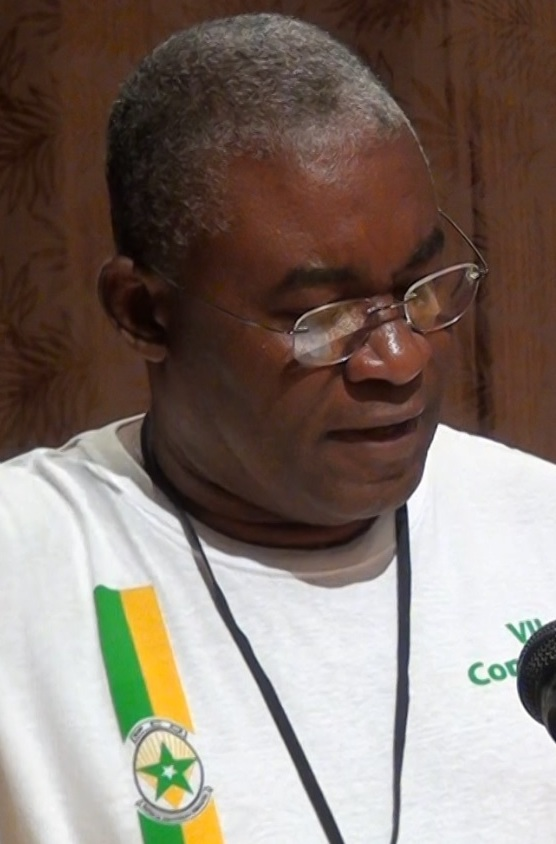
- President: Fradique de Menezes; Manuel Pinto da Costa

Health Minister of São Tomé and Príncipe

Arlindo Vicente de Assunção Carvalho is a Santomean politician who was the Health Minister under Joaquim Rafael Branco.

He visited Taiwan on April 9, 2007, in company with the Taiwanese Minister of Foreign Affairs Yang Tzu-pao and its health minister Hou Sheng-mou., later in July, he visited Brazil. He was notably headed with the center of endemic diseases, a national program that battled against tuberculosis (TB) in June 2014 as well as against malaria, as director of the centre.
