= Abnildo do Nascimento d'Oliveira =

São Toméan politician

Abnildo do Nascimento d’Oliveira

President of the National Assembly of São Tomé and Príncipe
- Incumbent
- Assumed office 12 February 2026
- Preceded by: Celmira Sacramento

Vice-President of the National Assembly of São Tomé and Príncipe
- In office 2022 – February 2026

Member of the National Assembly of São Tomé and Príncipe
- Incumbent
- Assumed office 2018

Personal details
- Party: Independent Democratic Action (ADI)

Abnildo do Nascimento d’Oliveira (also styled Abnildo d’Oliveira or Abnildo de Oliveira) is a São Toméan politician who serves as a President of the National Assembly and as a deputy for the National Assembly of São Tomé and Príncipe.

== Political career ==
In 2018, D’Oliveira was identified as a deputy of the Independent Democratic Action, frequently serving as the party’s spokesperson on parliamentary and political matters.

In July 2020, as an ADI deputy, he announced that the ADI parliamentary group was introducing a motion of no confidence against the XVII Constitutional Government.

In November 2022, D’Oliveira was elected Vice-President of the National Assembly for the new legislative term.

In February 2026, D’Oliveira was elected President of the National Assembly after dismissal of Celmira Sacramento.

== International activity ==
In April 2024, he visited Macau in connection with the 6th Ministerial Conference of the Forum for Economic and Trade Cooperation between China and Portuguese-speaking Countries (Forum Macau), where he met with Macau SAR’s Chief Executive, Ho Iat Seng.

== Statements ==
In January 2025, d’Oliveira publicly stated that the Assembly was “ready to embrace the great and various challenges the country is facing” and to promote “the best possible” for the São Toméan people, during New Year greetings to the President of the Republic.
