= São Toméan Workers Party =

Political party in São Tomé and Príncipe

The São Toméan Workers Party (Portuguese: Partido Trabalhista Santomense, PTS) is an opposition political party in São Tomé and Príncipe. The president of the party is Anacleto Rolin.

The party participated in the 2002 legislative elections, launching candidates in four electoral districts. In total it got 4.87% of the votes. However it failed to win a seat in the National Assembly.

The party supported Patrice Trovoada in the 2006 presidential election. He won 38.82% of the vote, finishing a distant second to the incumbent Fradique de Menezes, who received 60.58% of the vote.

In 2011, the party worked alongside the National Union for Democracy and Progress (UNDP), and the Christian Democratic Front (FDC) to appeal to Evaristo Carvalho, then president of the country, to attempt to resolve a labor strike with radio and other workers around the country.
