= 2002 São Toméan parliamentary election =

- 3 March 2002
- All 55 seats in the National Assembly; 28 seats needed for a majority
- Turnout: 66.29% (▲1.61pp)
Party	Leader	Vote %	Seats	+/–
MLSTP–PSD	Manuel Pinto da Costa	39.68	24	−7
PCD-GR – MDFL-PL	Armindo Aguiar	39.49	23	+15
Ue-Kedadji	Multi-leader alliance	16.26	8	−8
This lists parties that won seats. See the complete results below.
Results by district
Prime Minister before	Prime Minister after
Evaristo Carvalho; ADI	Gabriel Costa; ADI

Parliamentary elections were held in São Tomé and Príncipe on 3 March 2002. Following the elections Gabriel Costa was appointed Prime Minister of a coalition government with representatives from all three parties winning seats in parliament.

== Results ==
Party	Votes	%	Seats	+/–
MLSTP/PSD	15,618	39.68	24	–7
PCD-GR – MDFM-PL	15,542	39.49	23	+15
Ue-Kedadji (ADI–PRD–UNDP–CODO–PPP)	6,398	16.26	8	–8
São Toméan Workers Party	1,488	3.78	0	New
Voice of the Population Association	309	0.79	0	New
Total	39,355	100.00	55	0
Valid votes	39,355	97.38		
Invalid/blank votes	1,057	2.62		
Total votes	40,412	–		
Registered voters/turnout	60,961	66.29		
Source: African Election Database Alves Lopes
