= Delfim Neves =

São Toméan politician

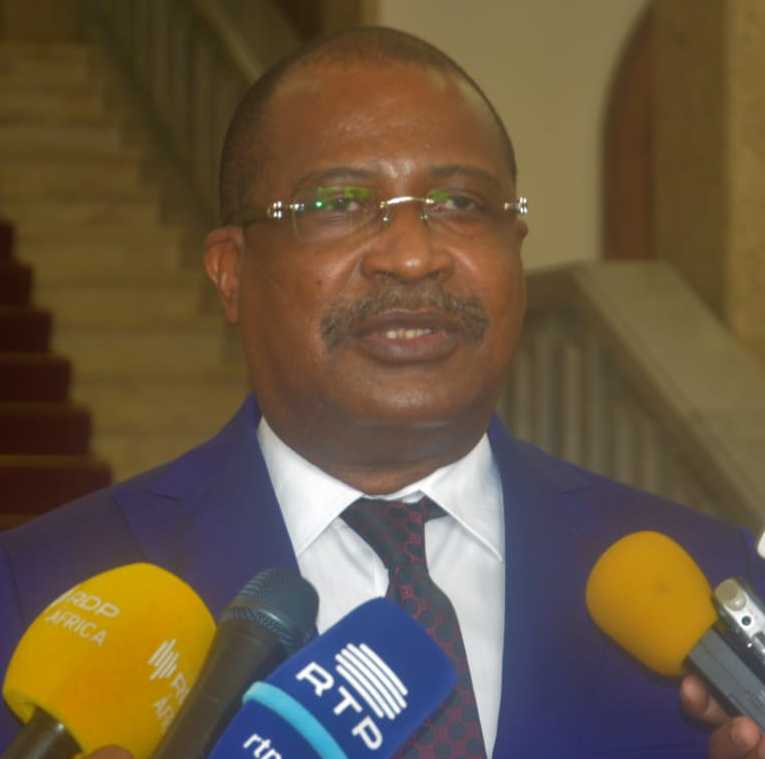

President of the National Assembly of São Tomé and Príncipe
- In office 22 November 2018 – 8 November 2022
- Preceded by: José da Graca Diogo
- Succeeded by: Celmira Sacramento

Personal details
- Born: Delfim Santiago das Neves; 5 June 1965 (age 61) Caué District, Portuguese São Tomé and Príncipe
- Party: PCD
- Children: 4
- Education: Federal University of Santa Catarina
- Occupation: Politician

Delfim Santiago das Neves (born 5 June 1965) is a São Toméan politician, serving as a member of parliament representing Lobata. He formally served as president of the National Assembly of São Tomé and Príncipe from 2018–2022. He was arrested following the 2022 São Tomé and Príncipe coup d'état attempt but exonerated and released shortly after.

== Biography ==
Neves was born on 5 June 1965 in Conceião, located in Caué District in São Tomé and Príncipe. He graduated at the Federal University of Santa Catarina. He has 4 children.

Neves ran in the 2011 presidential election and finished third with 14.36% of the vote, behind Evaristo Carvalho and the eventual winner Manuel Pinto da Costa.

In 2018, Neves became the president of the Democratic Convergence Party. He was elected President of the National Assembly on 22 November 2018, with 28 votes for his candidature, and 25 for his opponent, Carlos Cassandra Correia. In his inaugartion speech, he declared Alda do Espírito Santo and Francisco da Silva were his inspirations.

Neves was a candidate for the 2021 presidential election, supported by his Democratic Convergence Party. He finished third with 16.88% of the vote, behind Guilherme Posser da Costa and the eventual winner Carlos Vila Nova. He contested results alleging “massive electoral fraud” but was rejected by the Constitutional Court, with international observers praising the election.

On 25 November 2022, Neves was arrested for allegedly being involved in a coup d'état. However, he was later exonerated and released.
