= Aurélio Martins =

São Toméan politician (born 1966)

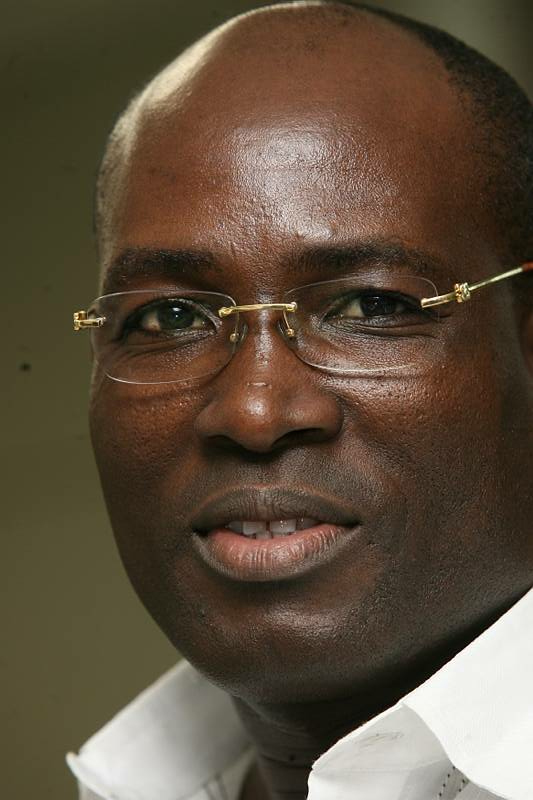
- Martins in 2010

President of MLSTP–PSD
- In office 29 November 2015 – 3 May 2018
- Preceded by: Jorge Amado
- Succeeded by: Jorge Bom Jesus
- In office 16 January 2011 – 9 June 2012
- Preceded by: Joaquim Rafael Branco
- Succeeded by: Jorge Amado

Personal details
- Born: 24 November 1966 (age 59)
- Party: MLSTP/PSD

Aurélio Pires Quaresma Martins (born 24 November 1966) is a São Toméan journalist, businessman and politician, who until May 2018 was leader of the Movement for the Liberation of São Tomé and Príncipe/Social Democratic Party (MLSTP/PSD).

== Journalist and businessman ==
Martins started his career as a journalist at São Tomé and Príncipe's National Radio (Rádio Nacional) between 1984 and 1985, and later worked at Angola's National Radio (RNA) from 1999 to 2007. He is the head of construction and security company Gibela Group and president of FAMA (Aurélio Martins' Foundation).

== Political career ==
Martins was elected to the National Assembly of São Tomé and Príncipe for the Lobata District in the 2010 legislative election and afterwards became president of the Humans Rights, Citizenship and Gender Commission in the National Assembly.

He was elected President of the MLSTP/PSD on the party's ordinary congress in January 2011.

Aurélio Martins was his party's candidate in the 2011 presidential election, but got only 4.06% of the votes and lost to former and MLSTP leader Manuel Pinto da Costa.

== Downfall ==
He was suspended from the party in mid-May 2018 due to backing the government's dismissal of three supreme court justices (incl. the court's president) who had ruled in favour of handing over the Rosema Brewery in Neves - controlled by the party's largest donor Antonio Monteiros and his brother Domingos Monteiros, who were both MPs for the party - to an Angolan businessman. He was replaced as party president with Jorge Bom Jesus at an extraordinary congress on 30 June.

== Honours ==
Martins was elected Figura do Ano (“São Toméan of the Year”) in 2007, 2008 and 2009.
