= Carlos Neves =

Santomean politician

Carlos Filomeno Agostinho das Neves

Secretary-General of Independent Democratic Action
- In office 1994–2001
- Preceded by: Party founded
- Succeeded by: Patrice Trovoada

Personal details
- Born: 20 June 1953 (age 73) Overseas Province of São Tomé and Príncipe, Portugal
- Party: Independent Democratic Action

Carlos Filomeno Azevedo Agostinho das Neves (born 20 June 1953) is a Santomean politician.

== Biography ==
He began his studies at the University of Lisbon in Portugal, and graduated with a bachelor's degree as well as a master's degree in History. His thesis, São Tomé and Príncipe in the Second Half of the 18th Century, was published in 1989.

In 1991, he was President of the Commission of Economic Affairs at the National Assembly, and remained in that position until 1998. In the same year, he got his first ambassador post as the nation's Ambassador to Portugal which he held to 1994; in 1992, he was also the country's ambassador to Spain for two years.

In 1994, he was secretary general of the Independent Democratic Action (ADI) party, and remained such until 2001. From 2002, he was Vice-President of the National Assembly until 2006. In 2004, he was President of the nation's Commission of Oil and Petrol (Gasoline) until 2006. He was counsellor at the National Assembly from 2008 to 2009. He was later Director of Administrative Department and Public Relations of the National Petrol Agency until 2012.

In September 2012, he became a representative for the United Nations (UN). From 2013, he was the Santomean Ambassador to the United States, and held the position until January 21, 2017.
