= Movement of Independent Citizens of São Tomé and Príncipe – Socialist Party =

Political party in São Tomé and Príncipe

Movement of Independent Citizens of São Tomé and Príncipe - Socialist Party Movimento de Cidadãos Independentes de São Tomé e Príncipe - Partido Socialista
- Abbreviation: MCI–PS
- Founder: António Monteiro; Domingos Monteiro
- Founded: 2018
- Split from: MLSTP–PSD
- Headquarters: São Tomé
- Ideology: Democratic socialism
- Political position: Left-wing

The Movement of Independent Citizens of São Tomé and Príncipe – Socialist Party (abbreviated MCI–PS; Portuguese: Movimento de Cidadãos Independentes de São Tomé e Príncipe – Partido Socialista) is a political party on São Tomé and Príncipe founded in 2018 by António and Domingos Monteiro, who represented the Movement for the Liberation of São Tomé and Príncipe (MLSTP–PSD) in the National Assembly until May 2018. Its main base is the southernmost municipality on São Tomé, Caué. Until 2020 it was known as simply the Movement of Independent Citizens of São Tomé (MCISTP).

At the 2018 parliamentary elections it got 1,659 votes and won two seats in the Caué constituency. The party only received 608 votes outside of Caué.

== Background ==
In May 2018 António and Domingos Monteiro and their cousin Beatriz Azevedo, who was the party's lead candidate in the Caué constituency, left the MLSTP parliamentary group and formed an independent group in the National Assembly. They had previously been suspended for attending a plenary session of the National Assembly, which the party boycotted, where they voted to dismiss three Supreme Court judges.

The three had along with fellow MPs Jorge Amado and Vasco Guiva constituted an internal opposition to the party leadership following the suspension of the previous party president Aurélio Martins.

The background for the conflict was a fight over the ownership of the Rosema brewery in Neves, which is run by Domingos Monteiro. The Supreme Court ruled to hand over the plant to the Angolan businessman Melo Xavier, which "plunged Sao Tome and Principe into a political-institutional crisis."

Antonio Monteiros had previously "conquered the national food trade market with a special emphasis on rice", and in 2009 gotten control over the Rosema brewery where he installed his brother Domingos as managing director. Antonio Monteiros was until he defected the main donor of MLSTP and his patronage network in Caué was the reason they held that municipality in the 2014 local elections, as the only one.

The ruling Independent Democratic Action (ADI) decided to intervene on behalf of the brothers and had a parliamentary resolution adopted that removed the judges who decided to hand over the brewery to Melo Xavier from the court, which "reinforced the political-commercial relations between the boss of Rosema Domingos Monteiro and the leader of the country, Prime Minister Patrice Trovoada".

Party president Aurélio Martins was in favour of the MLSTP supporting the brothers. However, since the MLSTP has close relations to the other ex-liberation movements in Lusophone Africa, a political intervention against an Angolan businessman with MPLA patronage was unacceptable to a majority of the party and he got removed from the leadership.
