= Union of Democrats for Citizenship and Development =

Political party in São Tomé and Príncipe

Union of Democrats for Citizenship and Development União dos Democratas para Cidadania e Desenvolvimento
- Founded: January 2005
- Split from: Independent Democratic Action
- Ideology: Centrism
- Political position: Centre

Union of Democrats for Citizenship and Development (Portuguese: União dos Democratas para Cidadania e Desenvolvimento) is a former political party in São Tomé and Príncipe, formed in January 2005. The party was formed amongst dissidents from the Independent Democratic Action (ADI).

The UDD failed to win any seats in the National Assembly following elections held on 26 March 2006.

The party supported Patrice Trovoada in the 30 July 2006 presidential election. He won 38.82% of the vote, finishing a distant second to the incumbent Fradique de Menezes, who received 60.58% of the vote.

== Merger and coalition ==
In late October 2017 the party and the Force for Change Democratic Movement – Liberal Party (MDFM–PL) formed the MDFM–UDD union (initially known as MDFM/PL–UDD). The two parties formally merged as the MDFM–UDD Union in August 2018.

Carlos Neves was elected chairman of the MDFM–UDD Union at its constitutive congress in August 2018.

In August 2018 the new party entered into an electoral alliance with the PDC, which gained 9.5% of the vote and 5 seats in the 2018 parliamentary elections.
