= Social Democratic Movement – Green Party of São Tomé and Príncipe =

Political party in São Tomé and Príncipe

Social Democratic Movement – Green Party of São Tomé and Príncipe Movimento Social Democrata – Partido Verde São Tomé and Príncipe
- Party logo
- Abbreviation: MSD–PVSTP
- President: Elsa Garrido
- General Secretary: Herodes Rompão
- Founder: Elsa Garrido
- Founded: 4 November 2017
- Headquarters: São Tomé, Rua 3 de Fevereiro
- Ideology: Green politics Social democracy
- Political position: Centre-left
- Colors: Green

Website
- partidoverdestp.com

The Social Democratic Movement – Green Party of São Tomé and Príncipe (Portuguese: Movimento Social Democrata – Partido Verde São Tomé and Príncipe, MSD–PVSTP) is a São Toméan green political party, founded 4 November 2017. Its current president is Elsa Garrido and its vice-president is Miques João.

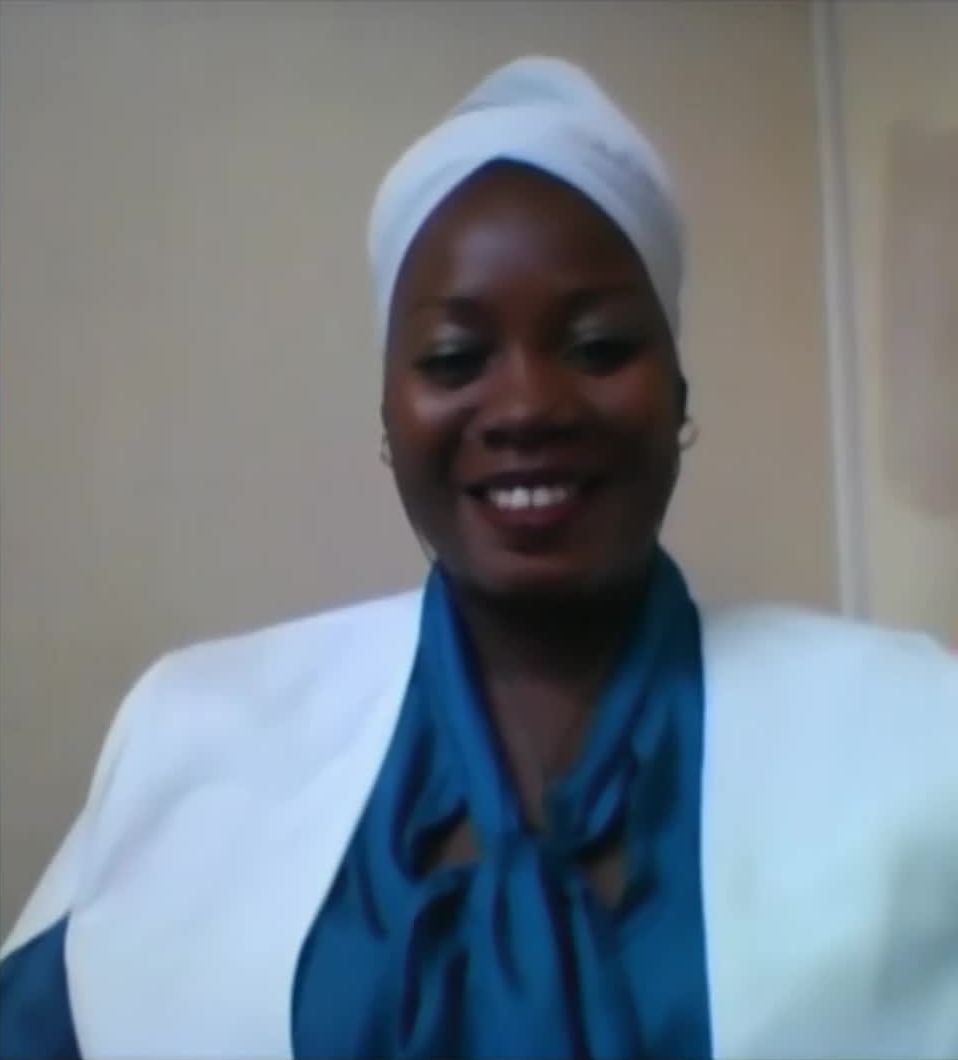
Elsa Garrido, founder and current president
