= Social Renewal Party (São Tomé and Príncipe) =

São Toméan political party

The Social Renewal Party (Portuguese: Partido da Renovação Social) was a political party in São Tomé and Príncipe. It was part of the Uê Kédadji coalition in 2006.

The party did not participate in the 2022 elections.
