= Force for Change Democratic Movement – Liberal Party =

Political party in São Tomé and Príncipe

Force for Change Democratic Movement – Liberal Party Movimento Democrático das Forças da Mudança – Partido Liberal
- President: Tomé Vera Cruz
- Founded: 29 July 2001
- Ideology: Liberalism; Social liberalism
- Political position: Centre
- Colors: Yellow and red

The Force for Change Democratic Movement – Liberal Party (Portuguese: Movimento Democrático das Forças da Mudança-Partido Liberal) is a former political party in São Tomé and Príncipe. It was formed after the 29 July 2001 presidential elections by supporters of the elected president Fradique de Menezes. Tomé Vera Cruz became the party's first Secretary General.

At the legislative elections, 3 March 2002, the party won together with the Democratic Convergence Party-Reflection Group 39.4% of the popular vote and 23 out of 55 seats. The same alliance won at the legislative election, held on 26 March 2006, 36.79% and 23 out of 55 seats.

Fradique de Menezes, who represented the party in the 30 July 2006 presidential election, was re-elected with 60.58% of the vote.

== Decline and merger ==
The party lost 22 seats in the 2010 parliamentary election after the Democratic Convergence Party – Reflection Group (PDC–RG) had left their alliance with it in 2008 and only retained a single seat, it sank further into irrelevancy after Menezes ceased to be president in 2011 and got no seats in the 2014 election.

In late October 2017 the party and the Union of Democrats for Citizenship and Development (UDD) formed the MDFM–UDD union (initially known as MDFM/PL–UDD). The two parties formally merged as the MDFM–UDD Union in August 2018.

Carlos Neves was elected chairman of the MDFM–UDD Union at its constitutive congress in August 2018.

In August 2018 the new party entered into an electoral alliance with the PDC, which gained 9.5% of the vote and 5 seats in the 2018 parliamentary elections.
