= Christian Democratic Front =

Political party in São Tomé and Príncipe

Christian Democratic Front Frente Democrática Cristã
- Abbreviation: FDC
- Secretary: Hamilton Barbosa
- Founder: Afonso dos Santos
- Founded: December 1990
- Ideology: Christian democracy

The Christian Democratic Front (Portuguese: Frente Democrática Cristã, abbr. FDC) is a small political party in São Tomé and Príncipe. In December 1990, Afonso dos Santos, who led the failed coup attempt of 1988, founded the FDC to contest the country's first multi-party elections that were taking place the following month.

It failed to win any seats in the National Assembly following elections held on 26 March 2006.

The party supported Fradique de Menezes in the 2006 presidential election. He was re-elected with 60.58% of the vote.

The discovery of a coup plot against Menezes, allegedly involving Christian Democratic Front leader Arlecio Costa, was announced on 12 February 2009. Costa and more than 30 others were arrested.
