= Patrice Lumumba Preparatory School =

- Escola Preparatória Patrice Lumumba

Location
- Avenida Kwama N'Krume; São Tomé, São Tomé Island; São Tomé and Príncipe
- Coordinates: 0.3365°N 6.7309°E

Information
- Established: 21 September 1952
- Director: Fernando Varela
- Enrollment: c. 3,000 (2015)

Patrice Lumumba Preparatory School (Portuguese: Escola Preparatória Patrice Lumumba, abbreviation: EPLP) is a lyceum located in the southwestern part of the city centre of São Tomé, São Tomé and Príncipe. It is the oldest secondary school in the country, established in 1952. It currently has about 3,000 students.

The one story building of the former Colégio-Liceu of São Tomé was designed by Lucínio Cruz. In 1959 it was renamed Liceu Nacional D. João II, after King John II of Portugal.

After independence in 1975, the school became a preparatory school, and the National Lyceum moved to the former technical school building. In 1988, in the midst of reforms of Santomean education, the school was named after Congolese leader Patrice Lumumba.

== See also ==
- List of buildings and structures in São Tomé and Príncipe
