= Our Lady of Conception Church, São Tomé =

Our Lady of Conception Church
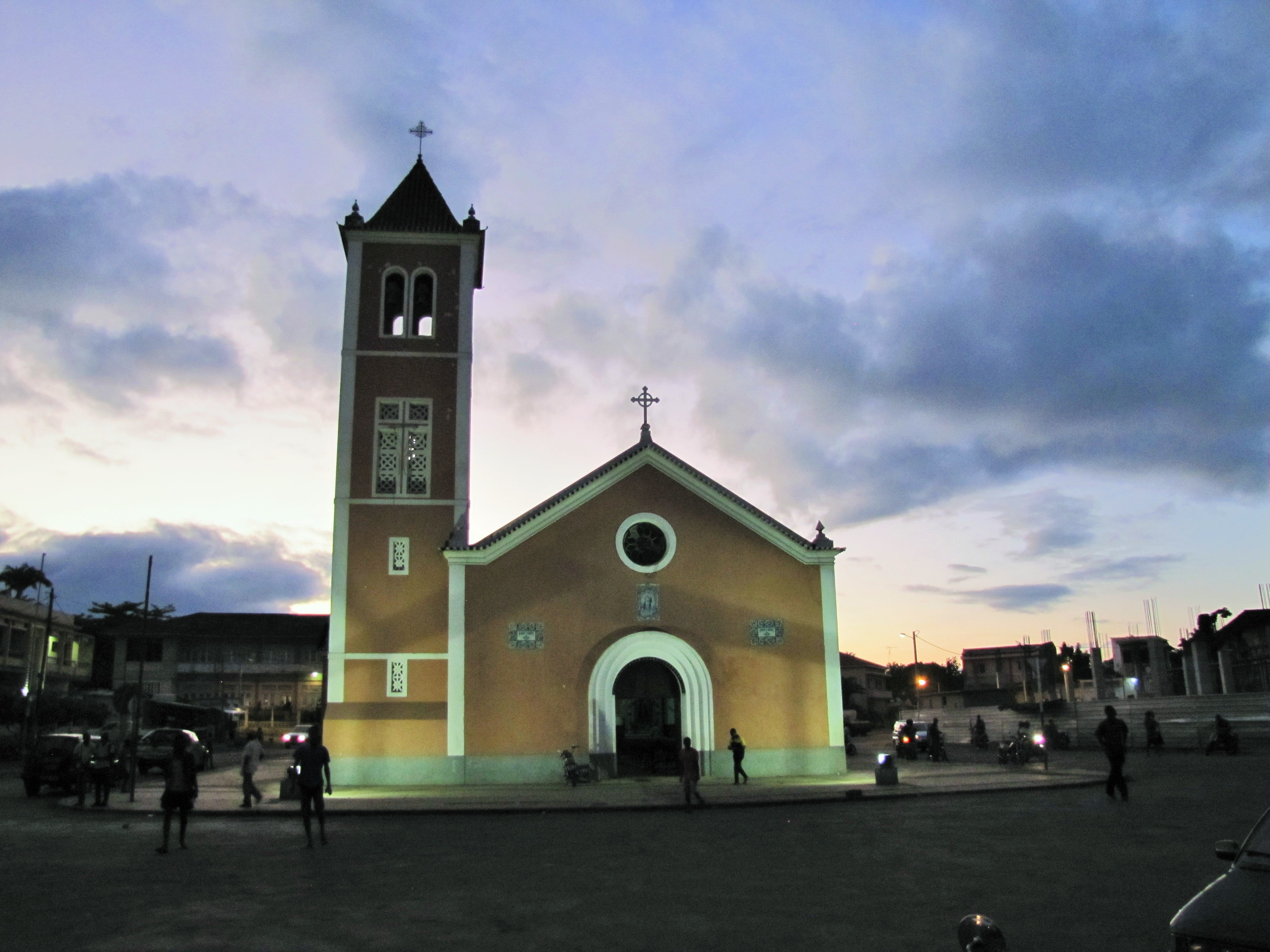
- Our Lady of Conception Church
- 0.339°N 6.727°E
- Location: São Tomé
- Country: São Tomé and Príncipe
- Denomination: Roman Catholic Church

The Our Lady of Conception Church (Portuguese: Igreja de Nossa Senhora da Conceição) also simply called Church of the Conception, is the name given to a parish church that is affiliated with the Catholic Church and is located in the Água Grande District, specifically on Conceição Avenue right next to the "Hotel Residêncial Baía" in the town of São Tomé on the island of the same name, capital of the African country of São Tomé and Principe.

It is alternatively known as the Igreja vermelha which in Portuguese means Red Church because of the color in this painting the temple. It has a single bell tower and the top of the main entrance is a statue of the Virgin Mary.

In 2011 during the tour of the Pilgrim Image of Our Lady of Fatima they brought from Portugal, activities such as Masses, novenas and processions that reached the cathedral church of São Tomé (Sé Catedral de Nossa Senhora da Graça) were held.

== See also ==
- Roman Catholicism in São Tomé and Príncipe
- Our Lady of Grace Cathedral, São Tomé
