= Hospital Ayres de Menezes =

Coordinates: 0.3567°N 6.7222°E

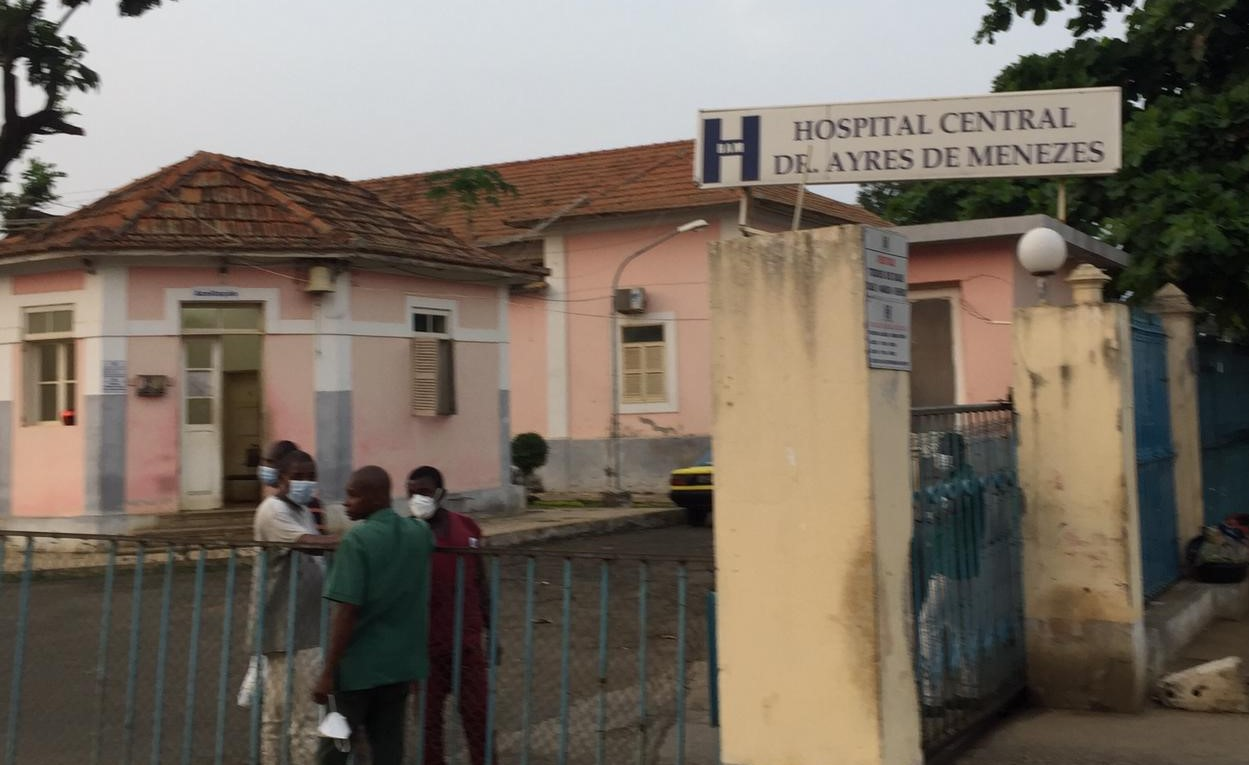

- Location within São Tomé

Geography
- Location: São Tomé, São Tomé and Principe

Links
- Website: http://saude.gov-stp.net/spip.php?article22

Hospital Ayres de Menezes is the main hospital in the capital city of São Tomé in São Tomé and Príncipe. In 2009, a hemodialysis centre was installed with Portuguese aid. In late June 2017, a new CT scan facility was opened.

== See also ==
- List of buildings and structures in São Tomé and Príncipe
