= Abílio Rodas de Sousa Ribas =

Portuguese Roman Catholic bishop (1931–2025)

His Excellency Abílio Rodas de Sousa Ribas
- Bishop Emeritus of São Tomé and Príncipe
- Diocese: São Tomé and Príncipe
- Appointed: 3 December 1984
- Term ended: 1 December 2006
- Predecessor: Moisés Alves de Pinho
- Successor: Manuel António Mendes dos Santos

Orders
- Ordination: 21 September 1957
- Consecration: 24 February 1985 by Alexandre do Nascimento

Personal details
- Born: 2 January 1931 Várzea do Soajo, Portugal
- Died: 2 February 2025 (aged 94) Braga, Portugal

Abílio Rodas de Sousa Ribas, C.S.Sp. (2 January 1931 – 2 February 2025) was a Portuguese-born Catholic bishop emeritus of the Roman Catholic Diocese of São Tomé and Príncipe in the nation of São Tomé and Príncipe and a member of the Congregation of the Holy Spirit.

Bishop Ribas was born in 1931 in Várzea do Soajo, Soajo, Portugal. He served as the Bishop of the Diocese of São Tomé and Príncipe from 1984 until his retirement in 2006.

Ribas died in Braga, Portugal on 2 February 2025, at the age of 94.

== See also ==
- Catholic Church in São Tomé and Príncipe

Catholic Church titles
| Preceded by Moisés Alves de Pinho | Bishop of São Tomé and Príncipe; 1984–2006 | Succeeded by Manuel António Mendes dos Santos |
