= Soveral =

Soveral is a Portuguese surname. Notable people with the surname include:

- André de Soveral (1572–1645), Portuguese-Brazilian Catholic saint and martyr
- Francisco de Soveral (c.1565–1642) Portuguese bishop
- Isabel Soveral (born 1961), Portuguese composer
- Laura Soveral (1933–2018), Portuguese actress
- Luís Pinto de Soveral, 1st Marquis of Soveral (1851–1922), Portuguese diplomat
