= Religion in São Tomé and Príncipe =

Religion in São Tomé and Príncipe (Pew Research Center 2020)
1. Christianity (84.4%)
2. Unaffiliated (9.70%)
3. Other religions (5.90%)

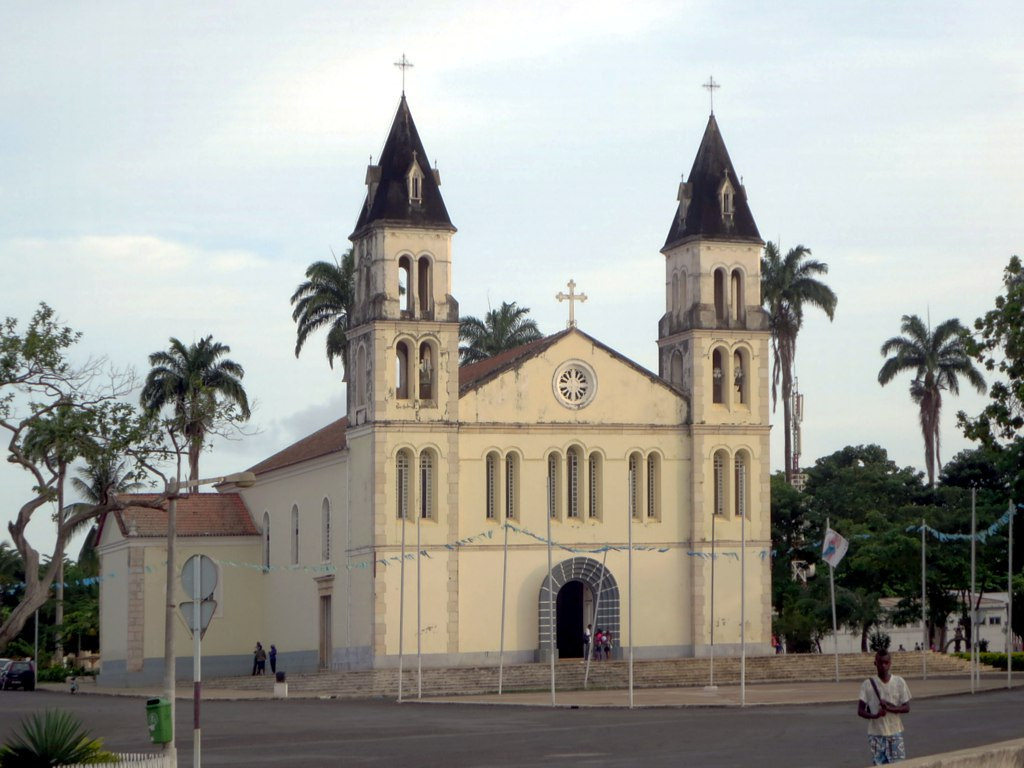
Our Lady of Grace Cathedral, São Tomé

Christianity is the predominant religion in São Tomé and Príncipe, with Catholicism being the largest denomination. There is also a substantial minority of the adherents of Baháʼí Faith.

São Tomé and Príncipe is a secular state, and the nation's constitution provides for freedom of religion and worship.

== History ==
In 1469, Portuguese sailors discovered a deserted island in the Gulf of Guinea near the equator, which was named São Tomé. On January 17, 1472, a neighboring island was discovered, which was called Príncipe. Settlement on the São Tomé island began in 1493, when Álvaro Caminha received the territory from King John II, along with a special privilege to buy slaves for the development of the area. During the Inquisition, Portuguese Jews were sent to the island, either as convicts or immigrants. Similarly, Príncipe island was inhabited in 1500. The Portuguese spread Catholicism, being the first religion of the islands. On January 31, 1533, Pope Clement VII created the bishopric of São Tomé and Príncipe, whose jurisdiction extended to the Catholics of Angola and Mozambique from 1534 until 1842; by 1960, there were 2,888 Protestants, 9,888 pagans, and 56,000 Catholics on the islands. After gaining independence on July 12, 1975, it was announced that Catholicism was the state religion, and other religions were banned; in 1990, freedom of religion was declared. In the last decade, immigration of Muslims from Nigeria and Cameroon has intensified.

== Religions ==
=== Christianity ===
According to the CIA report in 2012, the share of Christians is 72%, with Catholicism representing the majority. In 2000, there were 45 churches and Christian places of worship in São Tomé and Príncipe belonging to 19 different Christian denominations.

The Sovereign Military Hospitaller Order of Saint John of Jerusalem is actively operating on the islands.

=== Traditional Beliefs ===
After the Portuguese began colonizing São Tomé and Príncipe, black slaves were brought from the African continent to work on plantations on the islands. They introduced traditional African cults and beliefs to the site, such as animism, totemism and mortuary cult. Combined with Catholicism, this led to the rise of multiple syncretic religions.

=== Judaism ===
In 1496, King Manuel I began converting Jews to Christianity by force. In 1497, 2,000 Jewish children aged 2 to 10 were deported to São Tomé island, where they received a Catholic education isolated from their families; five years later, only 600 of the 2,000 children had survived. Despite the efforts of the Catholic priests, some of the children continued to adhere to Judaism and their descendants continued to live on the island, with some Jewish customs and traditions being adopted by the local Creole culture. In the early 17th century, the Catholic bishop of São Tomé, Pedro da Cunha Lobo, complained about the "problem of Judaism" on the island. In the 20th century, there was a particular influx of Jewish traders involved in the sale of cocoa and sugar; some of them are buried in the cemeteries of São Tomé and Príncipe. According to the Pew Research Center, Jews in São Tomé and Príncipe are 0.1% of the country's population.

=== Islam ===
The Muslim community is small but has been increasing in recent years. The number of Muslims in São Tomé and Príncipe ranges from 1% to 2% of the population and are mainly migrants from Nigeria, Cameroon and other African countries.

=== Other religions ===
In São Tomé and Príncipe, a Melanesian belief is present, whose followers are 2.9% of the population of the islands. Small groups of Buddhists and Hindus, descendants of immigrants from India and China, comprise 0.1% of the population.

== See also ==
- Catholic Church in São Tomé and Príncipe
- History of São Tomé and Príncipe
