= List of buildings and structures in São Tomé and Príncipe =

A list of buildings and structures in São Tomé and Príncipe:

Name	Location	Type	Date	Notes/References
Estádio Nacional 12 de Julho	0.335083°N 6.7375°E	Stadium	20th century	Remodeled in 2002, expanded in 2003, operated by Federação Santomense de Futebol.
International Bank of São Tomé and Príncipe	0.3397669°N 6.7291153°E	Bank	20th century	Portuguese: Banco Internacional de Sao Tome e Principe
Lagoa Azul Lighthouse	0.3997425°N 6.6047207°E	Lighthouse	1997	Built as part of a project by the Portuguese Navy and powered by solar energy.
National Assembly	0.331389°N 6.740556°E	Government building		Portuguese: Assembleia Nacional de São Tomé e Príncipe.
National Library of São Tomé e Príncipe	0.339062°N 6.733215°E	Library	2002	Portuguese: Biblioteca Nacional de São Tomé e Príncipe.
National Lyceum	0.338611°N 6.740556°E	School	20th century	
Our Lady of Grace Cathedral, São Tomé	0.338333°N 6.7325°E	Church	1814	Portuguese: Sé Catedral de Nossa Senhora da Graça de São Tomé.
Presidential Palace of São Tomé e Príncipe	0.339062°N 6.733215°E	Government building	Mid-19th century	Architect unknown, renovated in 1954.
Príncipe Airport	1.662778°N 7.411667°E	Airport	1968	Renovation completed in 2015.
University of São Tomé and Príncipe	0.3261039°N 6.7283052°E	School	1996	Formerly named Instituto Superior Politécnico.
São Sebastião Lighthouse	0.333333°N 6.733333°E	Lighthouse	1928	Located adjacent to the National Museum of History and Art.
São Sebastião Museum	0.345833°N 6.739444°E	Museum	1976	Located on the site of the first fort in the island of São Tomé.
São Tomé International Airport	0.378056°N 6.712222°E	Airport	20th century	Administered by Empresa Nacional de Aeroportos e Segurança Área.
Supreme Court of São Tomé and Príncipe	0.339744°N 6.733433°E	Government building	1976	Portuguese: Supremo Tribunal de Justiça.

== See also ==
- List of hospitals in São Tomé and Príncipe
- List of lighthouses in São Tomé and Príncipe
