= Daniel Damásio Ascensão Filipe =

Cape Verdean poet and journalist

Daniel Damásio Ascensão Filipe (December 11, 1925 in Boa Vista Island, Cape Verde - April 6, 1964) was a Cape Verdean poet and journalist.

He was born in the island of Boa Vista in 1926. He went to Portugal when he was a child and later gratuded at the Curso Geral dos Liceus. He studied at lyceums in Portugal and later as a co-director in the work Notícias do Bloqueio (Bloc News), collaborated with the review and realized by the Emissora National on the literary program Távola Redonda (Voice of the Emperor) and the journal Diário Ilustrado (1956-).

He was one of the founders of Claridade journal which was founded in 1936 alongside Manuel Lopes, Baltasar Lopes da Silva, Manuel Ferreira, Francisco José Tenreiro, António Aurélio Gonçalves and Jorge Barbosa. He was the youngest member. The journal was related to nationalism and opposition of colonial rule.

== Bibliography ==
Daniel Felipe becgan a literary activity in 1946 with Missiva, then Marinheiro em Terra (The Fishermen on Land) (1949), O Viageiro Solitário (1951), Recado para a Amiga Distante (1956), A Ilha e a Solidão (1957) that was awarded the Prémio Camilo Pessanha (Camilo Pessanha Award), the novel O Manuscrito na Garrafa (1960), A Invenção do Amor e Outros Poemas (The Invention of Love and Other Poems) (1961) and Pátria, Lugar de Exílio (1963).

One of his poems can be found on the CD Poesia de Cabo Verde e Sete Poemas de Sebastião da Gama (2007) by Afonso Dias.
