= João de Sahagún =

Bishop of São Tomé e Príncipe

Most Reverend João de Sahagún
- Bishop of São Tomé e Príncipe
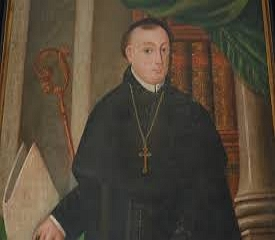
- Church: Catholic Church
- Diocese: Diocese of São Tomé and Príncipe
- In office: 1709–1730
- Predecessor: António da Penha de França
- Successor: Leandro de Santo Agostinho da Piedade

Orders
- Consecration: 1710

Personal details
- Born: 9 Apr 1668 Melres, Portugal
- Died: 12 Oct 1730 (age 62) São Tomé e Príncipe

João de Sahagún (9 April 1668 – 12 October 1730), born João Pinto Brandão, was a Roman Catholic prelate and missionary who served as Bishop of São Tomé e Príncipe from 1709 until his death in 1730. He was a member of the Order of Discalced Augustinians.

== Early life ==
João de Sahagún was born on 9 Apr 1668 to Pedro Pinto Cunha Brandão and Serafina de Andrade, an important family of Melres, Portugal. As the eldest son, he was introduced early to religious studies. By the age of 13, he was enrolled at the Colégio dos Órfãos in Porto, where he distinguished himself in Latin and rhetoric, capturing the attention of the Augustinian monks. At the age of 25, João entered the Order of Discalced Augustinians at the Convento de Nossa Senhora da Piedade in Santarém. On July 22, 1693, he made his religious vows and assumed the name João de Sahagún in honor of the Catholic saint and martyr, Saint John of Sahagún.

== Missionary work in São Tomé ==
Frei João de Sahagún's dedication to religious life and scholarly pursuits made him a respected member of his order, and his desire to serve in missionary work grew stronger over time. After his father's death, he renounced his family inheritance, giving it to his sister Guiomar, and set sail for São Tomé. There, he served as a missionary for seven years before being appointed Bishop of São Tomé e Príncipe on 22 Jul 1709 by Pope Clement XI. In 1710, he was consecrated bishop.

Upon his appointment, he worked to address the severe divisions within the local clergy and clergy-related disputes that plagued the island's religious community. However, this proved to be a significant challenge, and in 1714, he traveled to Lisbon to request his resignation from the position. His appeal was denied, and he returned to his post in São Tomé.

Upon his return, the island of São Tomé faced frequent attacks from French forces leading to the destruction of the Church of Nossa Senhora da Conceição, adjacent to the convent of the Augustinian Order. João took the lead in the church's reconstruction efforts in 1719. He served as Bishop of São Tomé e Príncipe until his death on 12 Oct 1730.

Catholic Church titles
Preceded by António da Penha de França	Bishop of São Tomé e Príncipe; 1709–1730	Succeeded by Leandro de Santo Agostinho da Piedade
