= Francisco José Tenreiro =

- Born: 20 January 1921; São Tomé
- Died: 1963 (aged 41–42); Lisbon, Portugal
- Occupations: geographer, poet

Francisco José Tenreiro (20 January 1921 – 1963) was a São Toméan geographer and poet who lived during the colonial era. He was taught at the Overseas Political and Social Sciences Institute, now known as the Instituto Superior de Ciências Sociais e Políticas (ISCSP, High Science and Politics Institute) of the University of Lisbon.

== Biography ==
In his teenage years, he was one of the founders of the Cape Verdean review Claridade journal which was founded in 1936 alongside Cape Verdeans Manuel Lopes, Baltasar Lopes da Silva, Manuel Ferreira, António Aurélio Gonçalves, Jorge Barbosa and Daniel Filipe. The journal was related to nationalism and opposition of colonial rule.

He was alumnus of the geographer Orlando Ribeiro when he was at Escola Superior Colonial (High Colonial Studies), where he studied geography, he also stimulated for making a doctorate thesis on Tenreiro's native island. He also studied in London and later Instituto Superior de Ciências Sociais e Política Ultramarina (High Institute of Overseas Social Sciences and Politics) in Lisbon and was promoted as philosopher in 1961 at the Faculty of the University of Lisbon. He was later a docent there.

He published several essays and were featured in newspapers and reviews. The main subject was the blacks suffering during colonial rule and the problems of the black diaspora in Portugal and around the world. Even in problems with African-Americans, he inspired the poem Blues Fragment (Fragmento do Blues) dedicated to Langston Hughes. His famous poem was Negro de todo o mundo (Blacks From All the World).

He took part in Portuguese neo-realism since its appointment.

As member of the Portuguese Parliament, he represented São Tomé and Príncipe.

He died in 1963 in Lisbon, Portugal.

== Legacy ==
He is regarded as one of the greatest writers in the nation and is the most influential writer of the nation.

The literary award of São Tomé and Príncipe is named after him.

The National Library of São Tomé and Príncipe has things named for him including a hall and a cultural center.

From December 2008 until the end of 2017, a printed portrait of himself was on the 100,000 dobra note.

== Works ==
- Ilha do Nome Santo (Island of the Holy Name), "Novo Cancioneiro" ("New Songs") Collection, Coimbra, 1942.
- Panorâmica da Literatura Norte-Americana, (Panorama on American Literature), book on African-American folk songs from the US, 1945
- Poesia Negra de Expressão Portuguesa (Black Poetry of Portuguese Expression), Lisbon, 1953, along with Mario de Andrade.
- Espelho do Invisível, 1959, Essayband.
- A Ilha de São Tomé (Estudo Geográfico) (São Tomé (St. Thomas) Island), Junta de Investigações do Ultramar ("Memórias" (Memories) Collection), 1961.
- Obra poesia completa, 1967 (published posthumously), republished in 1982 as "Coração em Africa" ("Heart of Africa") and contains all the poems made by the author
