= Leandro de Santo Agostinho da Piedade =

Most Reverend Leandro de Santo Agostinho da Piedade
- Bishop of São Tomé e Príncipe
- Church: Catholic Church
- Diocese: Diocese of São Tomé
- In office: 1738–1740
- Predecessor: João de Sahagún
- Successor: Tomas Luiz da Conceição

Orders
- Ordination: 31 Dec 1712
- Consecration: 25 Jan 1739 by Tomás de Almeida

Personal details
- Born: 14 November 1688 Lisbon, Portugal
- Died: 1740 (aged 51–52)

Leandro de Santo Agostinho da Piedade, O.A.D. (1688–1740) was a Roman Catholic prelate who served as Bishop of São Tomé e Príncipe (1738–1740).

== Biography ==
Leandro de Santo Agostinho da Piedade was born on 14 Nov 1688 in Lisbon, Portugal and ordained a priest in the Order of Discalced Augustinians on 31 Dec 1712. He was ordained a deacon in the order on 27 Dec 1713. On 21 Jul 1738, he was selected as the Bishop of São Tomé e Príncipe and confirmed by Pope Clement XII on 3 Sep 1738. On 25 Jan 1739, he was consecrated bishop by Tomás de Almeida, Patriarch of Lisbon, with Manoel da Cruz Nogueira, Bishop of São Luís do Maranhão, and Luiz de Santa Teresa da Cruz Salgado de Castilho, Bishop of Olinda, serving as co-consecrators. He served as Bishop of São Tomé e Príncipe until his death in 1740.

Catholic Church titles
Preceded by João de Sahagún	Bishop of São Tomé e Príncipe; 1738–1740	Succeeded by Tomas Luiz da Conceição
