= Tomas Luiz da Conceição =

Roman Catholic prelate (1703–1744)

Most Reverend Tomas Luiz da Conceição
- Bishop of São Tomé e Príncipe
- Church: Catholic Church
- Diocese: Diocese of São Tomé and Príncipe
- In office: 1742–1744
- Predecessor: Leandro de Santo Agostinho da Piedade
- Successor: Ludovico Das Chagas

Orders
- Ordination: 4 Aug 1726
- Consecration: 1743

Personal details
- Born: 25 Aug 1703 Lisbon, Portugal
- Died: 1744 (age 40) São Tomé e Príncipe

Tomas Luiz da Conceição, O.A.D. (1703–1744) was a Roman Catholic prelate who served as Bishop of São Tomé e Príncipe (1742–1744).

== Biography ==
Tomas Luiz da Conceição was born in Lisbon, Portugal on 25 Aug 1703 and ordained a priest in the Order of Discalced Augustinians on 4 Aug 1726. On 3 Jul 1742, he was selected as Bishop of São Tomé e Príncipe and confirmed by Pope Benedict XIV on 26 Nov 1742. In 1743, he was consecrated bishop. He served as Bishop of São Tomé e Príncipe until his death in 1744.

Catholic Church titles
Preceded by Leandro de Santo Agostinho da Piedade	Bishop of São Tomé e Príncipe; 1742–1744	Succeeded by Ludovico Das Chagas
