= São Tomé =

Capital and the largest city of São Tomé and Príncipe

São Tomé Tomé São
- City
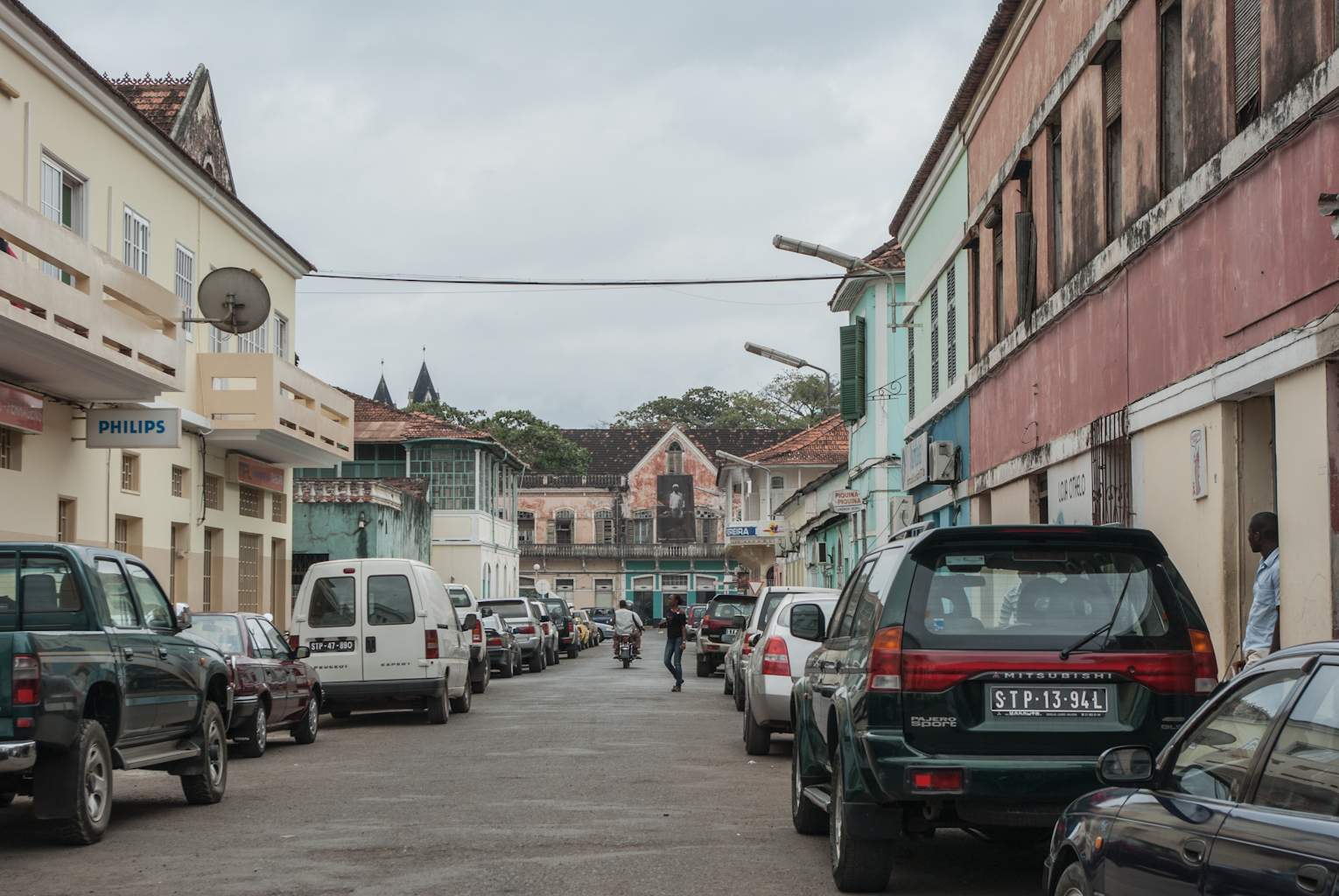
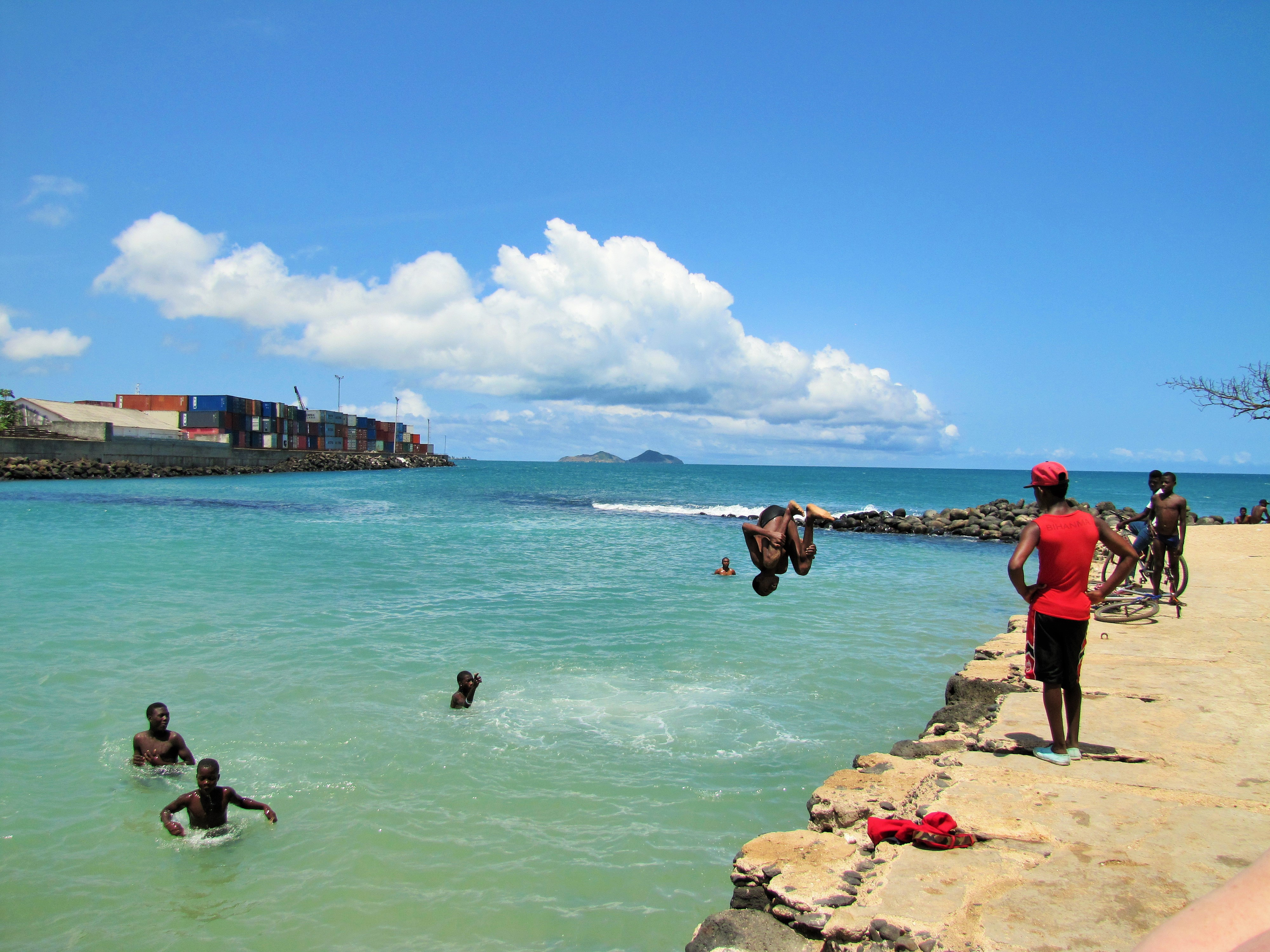
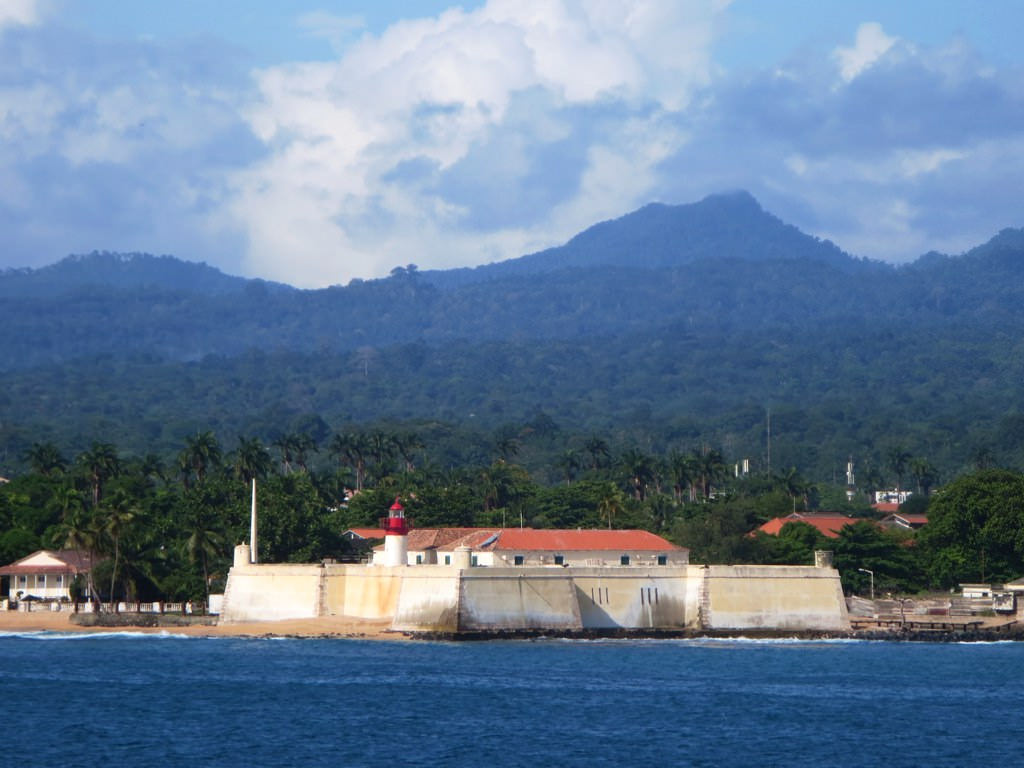
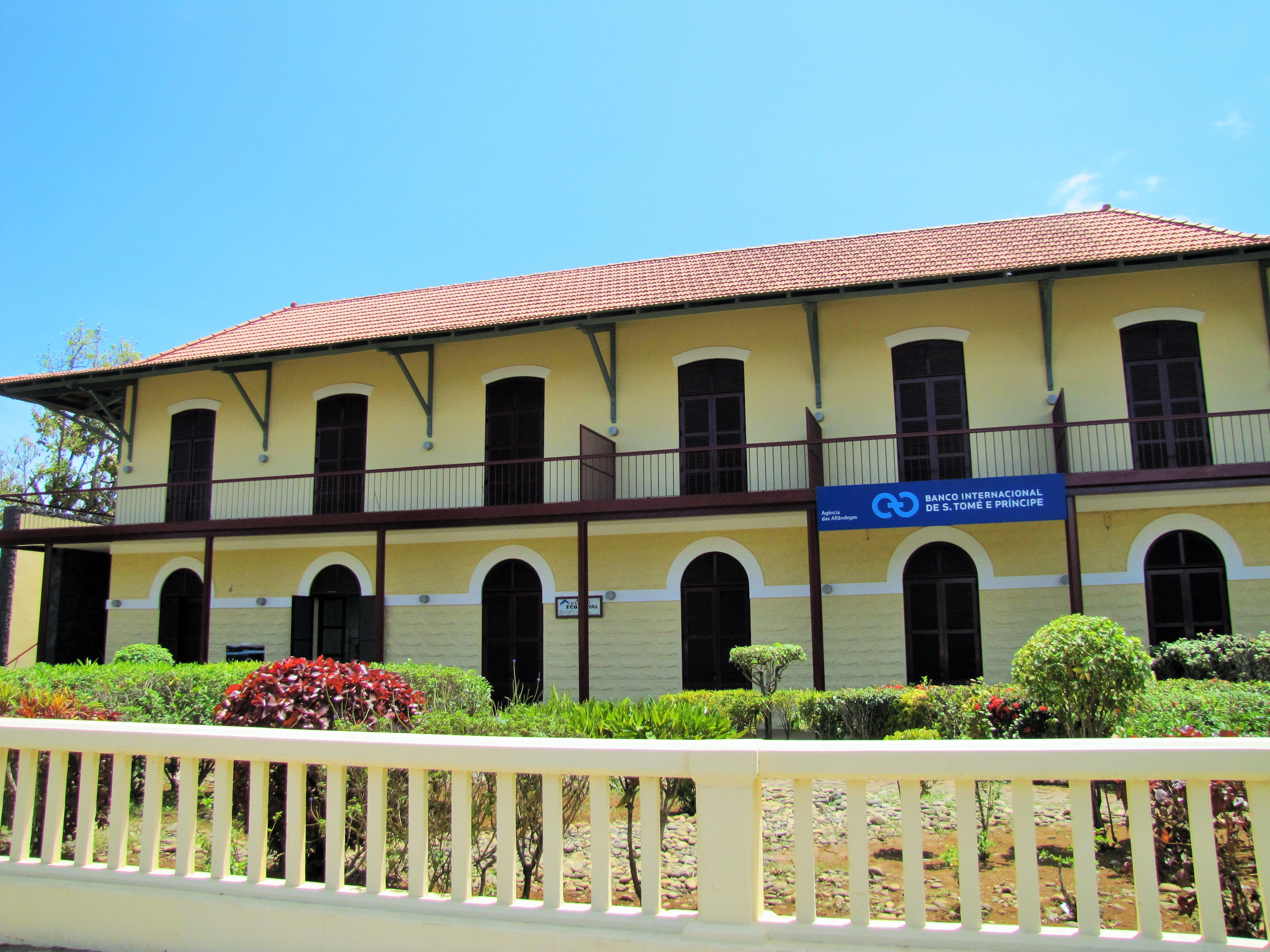
- (from top: left to right) Downtown São Tomé, Port of Sao Tome, Ana Chaves Bay and Bank International of Sao Tome.

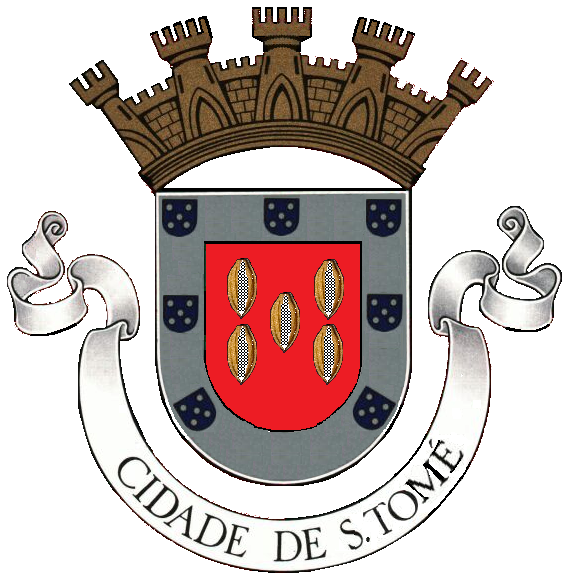
- Flag Coat of arms
- Nickname: ST
- Location in São Tomé and Príncipe Location in Africa
- Coordinates: 0°20′15″N 6°43′42″E
- Country: São Tomé and Príncipe
- Island: São Tomé
- District: Água Grande
- Founded: 1485
- Named for: Thomas the Apostle

Area
  - Total: 17 km^{2} (6.6 sq mi)
- Elevation: 137 m (449 ft)

Population (2015 estimate)
  - Total: 71,868
  - Density: 4,200/km^{2} (11,000/sq mi)
- Time zone: UTC+00:00 (GMT)
- Area code: +239-11x-xxxx through 14x-xxxx

São Tomé is the capital and largest city of the Central African island country of São Tomé and Príncipe. Its name is Portuguese for "Saint Thomas". Founded in the 15th century, it is one of Africa's oldest colonial cities.

== History ==
Álvaro Caminha founded the colony of São Tomé in 1493. The Portuguese came to São Tomé in search of land to grow sugarcane. The island was uninhabited before the arrival of the Portuguese sometime around 1470. São Tomé, situated about 40 kilometres (25 mi) north of the equator, had a climate wet enough to grow sugarcane in wild abundance. In 1497, 2,000 Jewish children, eight years old and under, were kidnapped from the Iberian peninsula, and forcefully converted to receive catholic education, following the national policy of conversion to Catholicism. The nearby African Kingdom of Kongo eventually became a source of slave labor as well. The island of São Tomé was the main center of sugar production in the sixteenth century; it was overtaken by Brazil by 1600.

São Tomé is centred on a sixteenth-century cathedral, that was largely rebuilt in the 19th century. Another early building is Fort São Sebastião, built in 1566 and now the São Tomé National Museum. On 9 July 1595, a slave revolt led by Rei Amador took control of the capital; they were subjugated in 1596. In 1599, the Dutch took the city as well as the islands for two days; they re-occupied it in 1641 for a year. The city served as the capital of the Portuguese colony of São Tomé and Príncipe and, from São Tomé and Príncipe's independence in 1975, as capital of the sovereign nation.

== Geography ==
Important as a port, São Tomé is on Ana Chaves Bay in the northeast of São Tomé Island, and Ilhéu das Cabras lies nearby offshore. São Tomé is northeast of Trindade, southeast of Guadalupe and northwest of Santana. It is linked to these towns by a highway that encircles almost the entire island of São Tomé.

Features of the town include the Presidential Palace, the cathedral, and a cinema. The city is also home to schools, and middle schools, high schools, one polytechnic, two markets, three radio stations, the public television station TVSP, several clinics and hospitals, the country's main airport – São Tomé International Airport (with direct regular scheduled flights to Angola, Gabon, Ghana and Portugal as well as occasional domestic flights to Príncipe), and many squares (praças). São Tomé also serves as the centre of the island's road and bus networks The town is well known for the tchiloli playing.

== Population history ==
Historical population
Year	Pop.	±%
1990 (June 23, Census)	42,331	—
2000 (June 16, Census)	49,957	+18.0%
2003 (Estimate)	53,300	+6.7%
2018 (July 1, Estimate)	71,868	+34.8%

== Transport ==
São Tomé is served by São Tomé International Airport with regular flights to Europe and other African countries.

== Climate ==
São Tomé features a tropical wet and dry climate (Köppen As), although it is not far above a semi-arid climate (BSh) due to the influence of the cold Benguela Current, which makes even the wettest months drier than would be expected for such a low latitude but at the same time makes the city very cloudy and foggy even during the almost rainless dry season mid-year. The city has a relatively lengthy wet season from October through May and a short dry season. São Tomé sees on average just under 900 mm (35 in) of rainfall per year. Temperatures in the city are relatively constant, with average high temperatures usually around 30 °C (86 °F) and average low temperatures around 22 °C (71.6 °F).

Climate data for São Tomé (São Tomé International Airport)
Month	Jan	Feb	Mar	Apr	May	Jun	Jul	Aug	Sep	Oct	Nov	Dec	Year
Record high °C (°F)	32.0 (89.6)	33.6 (92.5)	33.5 (92.3)	33.4 (92.1)	33.9 (93.0)	31.0 (87.8)	30.7 (87.3)	31.0 (87.8)	31.7 (89.1)	31.5 (88.7)	31.6 (88.9)	32.0 (89.6)	33.9 (93.0)
Mean daily maximum °C (°F)	29.4 (84.9)	29.9 (85.8)	30.2 (86.4)	30.1 (86.2)	29.3 (84.7)	28.0 (82.4)	27.3 (81.1)	27.7 (81.9)	28.6 (83.5)	28.7 (83.7)	29.0 (84.2)	29.1 (84.4)	28.9 (84.0)
Daily mean °C (°F)	25.9 (78.6)	26.2 (79.2)	26.4 (79.5)	26.4 (79.5)	26.0 (78.8)	24.7 (76.5)	23.8 (74.8)	24.1 (75.4)	25.0 (77.0)	25.2 (77.4)	25.5 (77.9)	25.6 (78.1)	25.4 (77.7)
Mean daily minimum °C (°F)	22.4 (72.3)	22.5 (72.5)	22.6 (72.7)	22.6 (72.7)	22.6 (72.7)	21.4 (70.5)	20.4 (68.7)	20.5 (68.9)	21.3 (70.3)	21.8 (71.2)	22.0 (71.6)	22.1 (71.8)	21.8 (71.2)
Record low °C (°F)	19.1 (66.4)	19.6 (67.3)	19.2 (66.6)	19.4 (66.9)	18.5 (65.3)	14.0 (57.2)	14.0 (57.2)	13.4 (56.1)	16.0 (60.8)	18.3 (64.9)	18.8 (65.8)	19.6 (67.3)	13.4 (56.1)
Average rainfall mm (inches)	81 (3.2)	84 (3.3)	131 (5.2)	122 (4.8)	113 (4.4)	19 (0.7)	0 (0)	1 (0.0)	17 (0.7)	110 (4.3)	99 (3.9)	108 (4.3)	885 (34.8)
Average rainy days (≥ 0.1 mm)	8	8	12	11	10	3	2	3	6	12	11	8	94
Average relative humidity (%)	85	84	83	83	84	79	77	78	79	82	85	85	82
Mean monthly sunshine hours	142.6	135.6	139.5	126.0	145.7	165.0	161.2	148.8	120.0	114.7	135.0	142.6	1,676.7
Mean daily sunshine hours	4.6	4.8	4.5	4.2	4.7	5.5	5.2	4.8	4.0	3.7	4.5	4.6	4.6
Source: Deutscher Wetterdienst

== Education ==
- University of São Tomé and Príncipe, formed in 2016
- National Lyceum
- Patrice Lumumba Preparatory School
- National Library of São Tomé and Príncipe

The following Portuguese international schools are in the city:

- Escola Portuguesa de S. Tomé
- Instituto Diocesano de Formação João Paulo II
- Escola Bambino
- Escola Internacional de S. Tomé e Príncipe

== Health ==
The main hospital of the country is Hospital Ayres de Menezes.

== Sports ==
Sports clubs based in the city include Sporting Praia Cruz and Vitória FC based in the neighborhood of Riboque. All clubs play at Estádio Nacional 12 de Julho.

== Places of worship ==
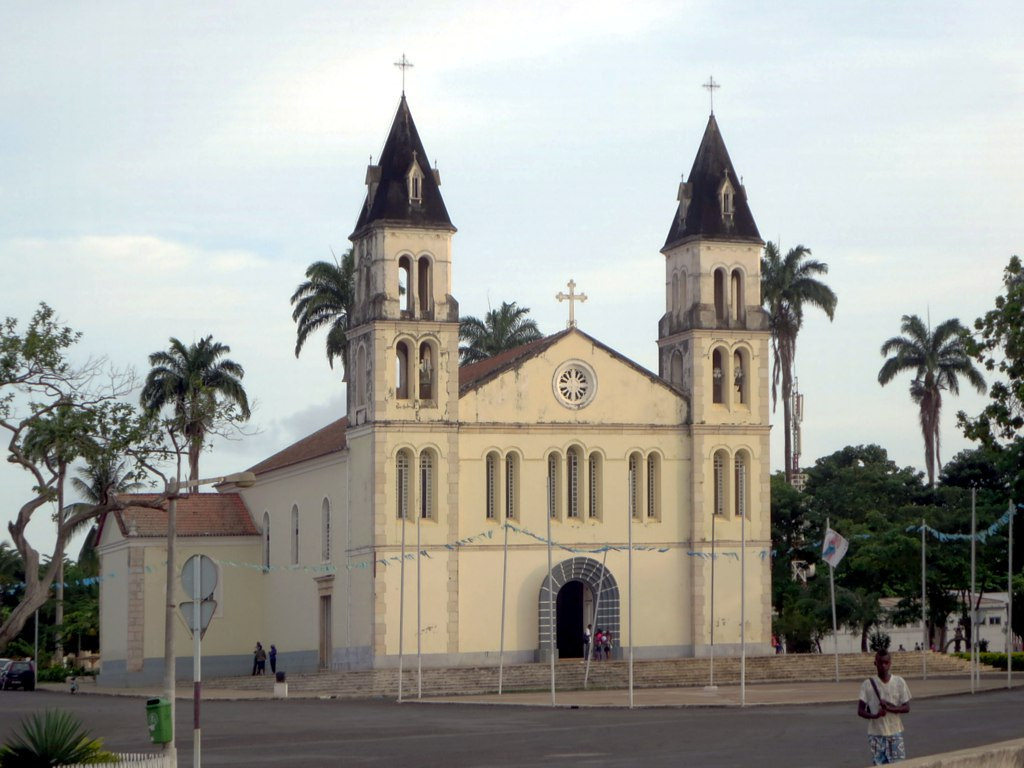
Our Lady of Grace Cathedral, São Tomé

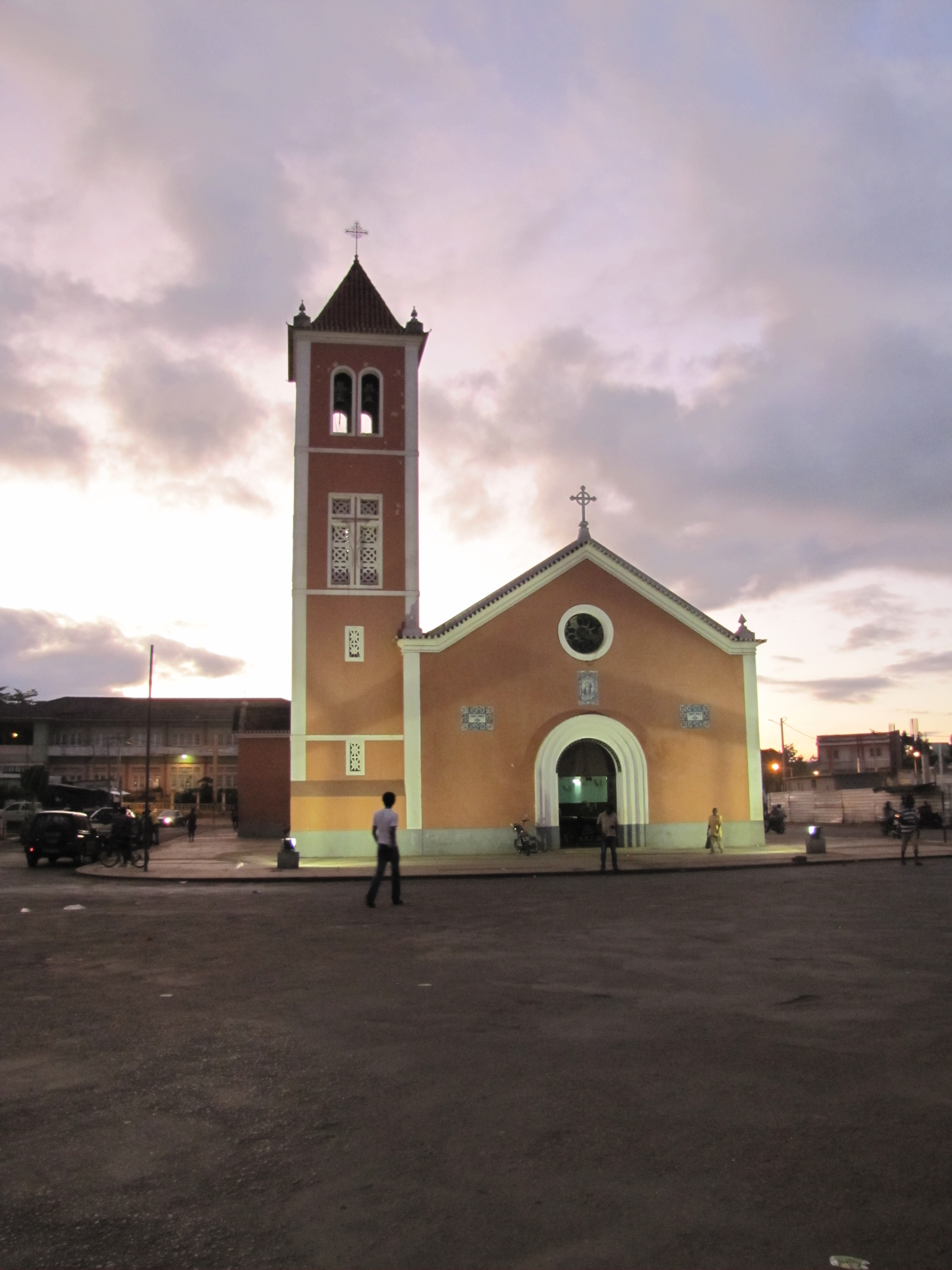
Our Lady of Conception Church, São Tomé

Among the places of worship, they are predominantly Christian churches and temples : Roman Catholic Diocese of São Tomé and Príncipe (Catholic Church), Universal Church of the Kingdom of God, Assemblies of God.

== Gallery ==
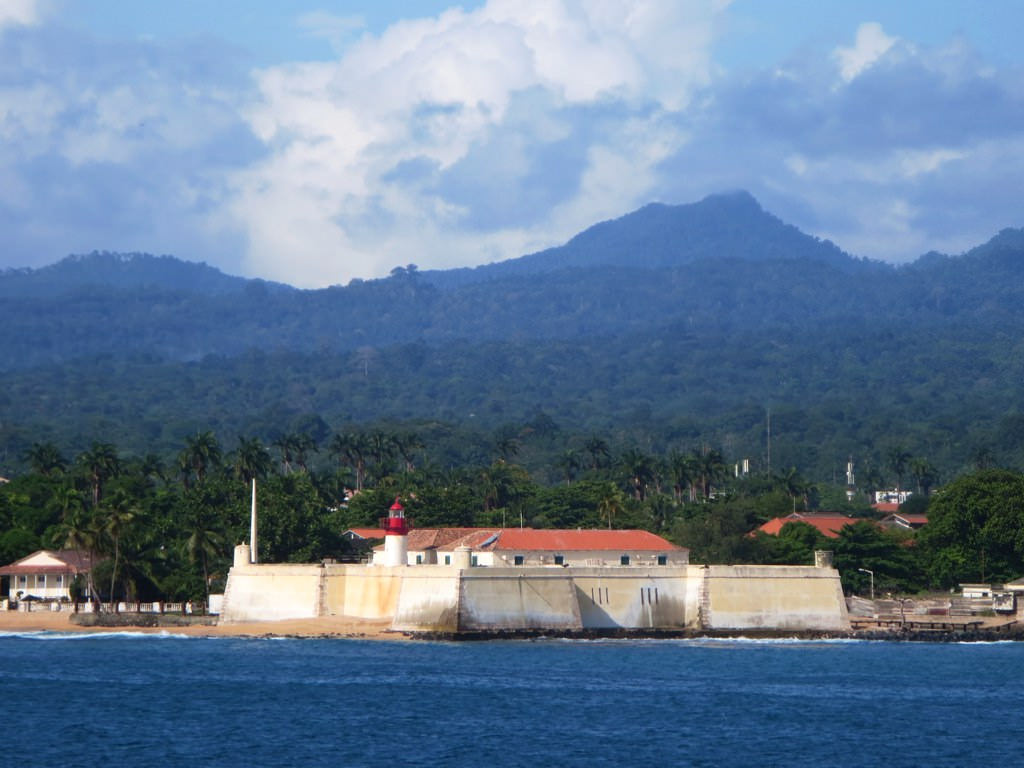
São Sebastião Museum.

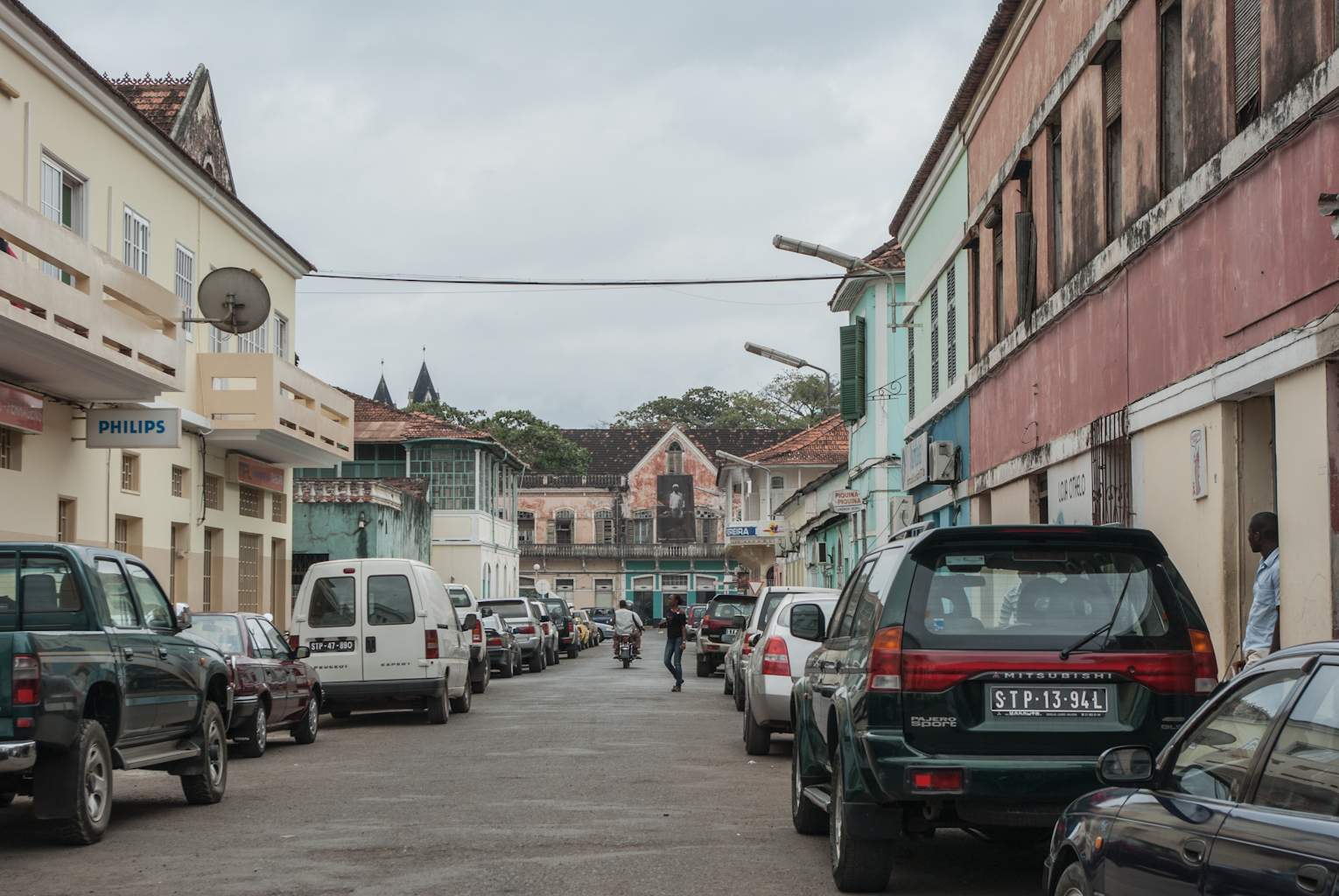
São Tomé City

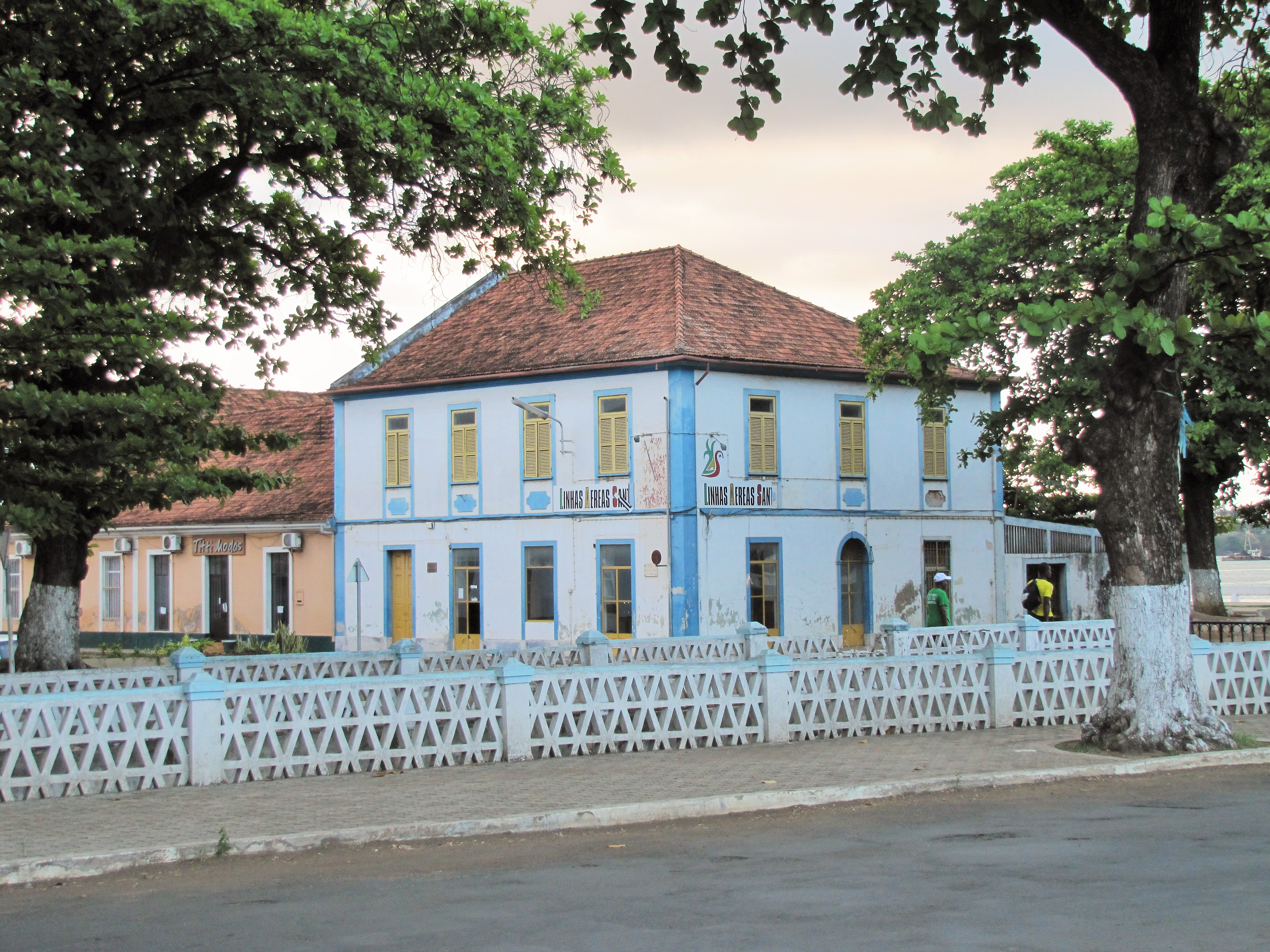
Downtown São Tomé

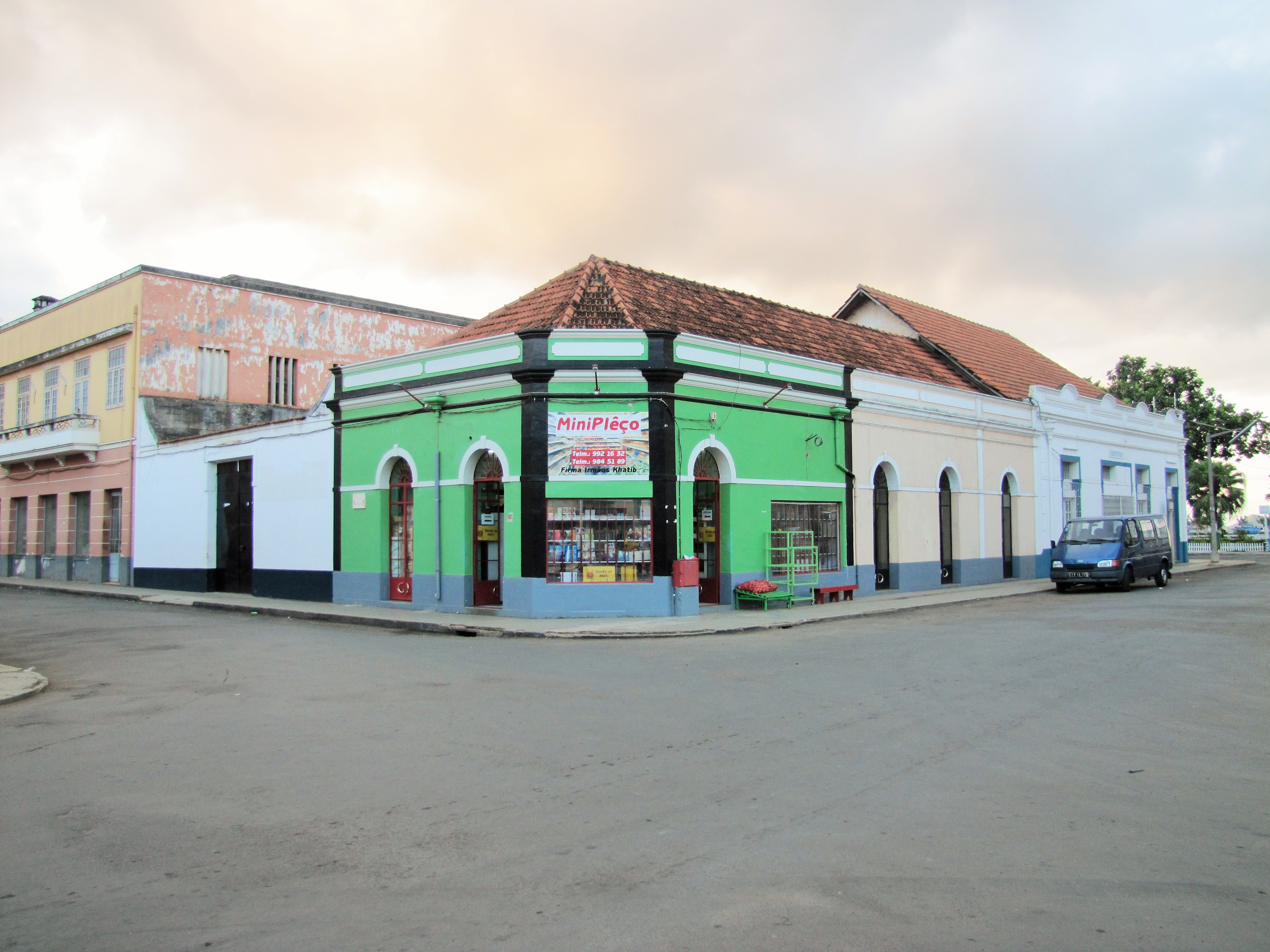
São Tomé City

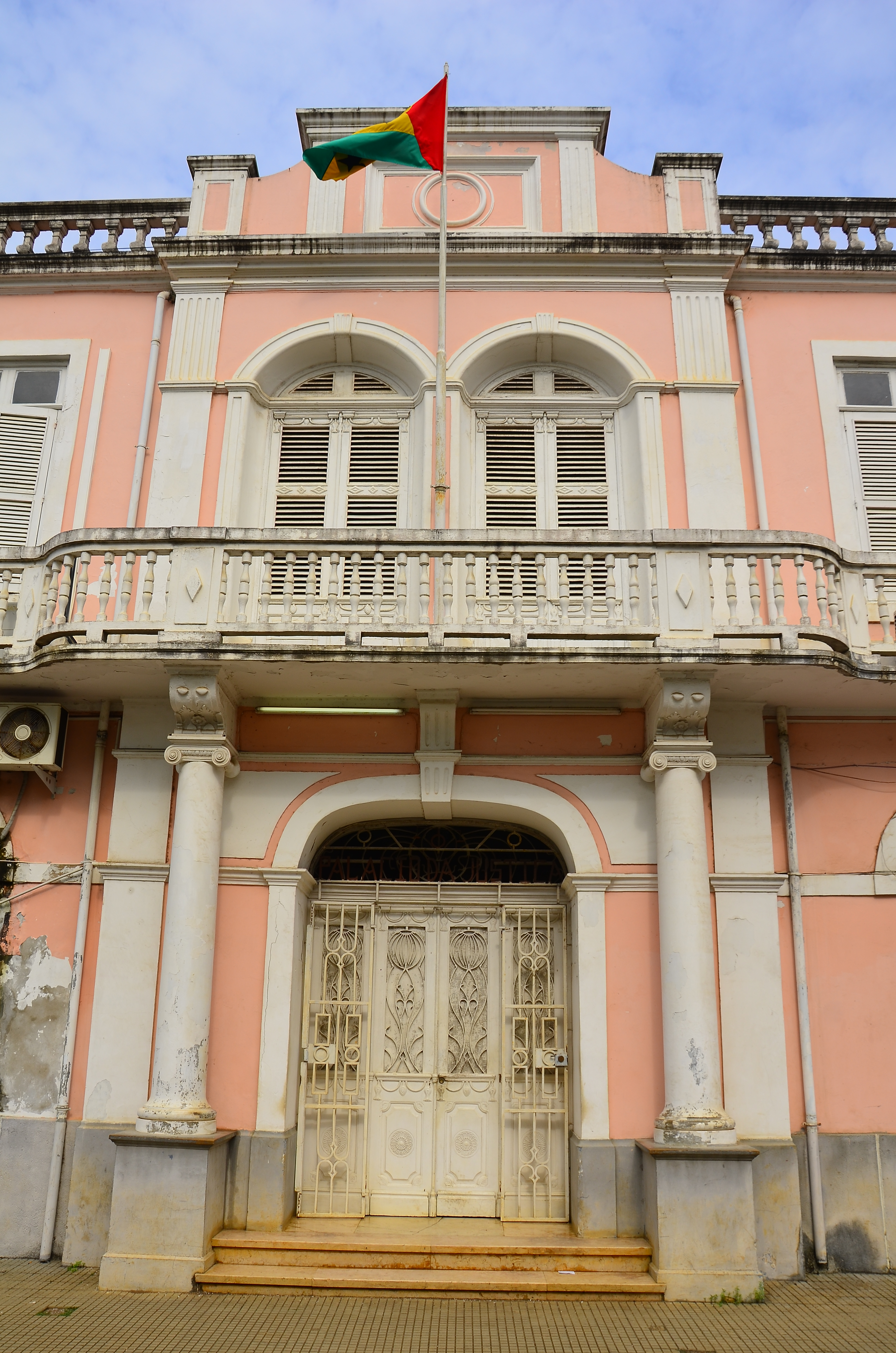
Supreme Court

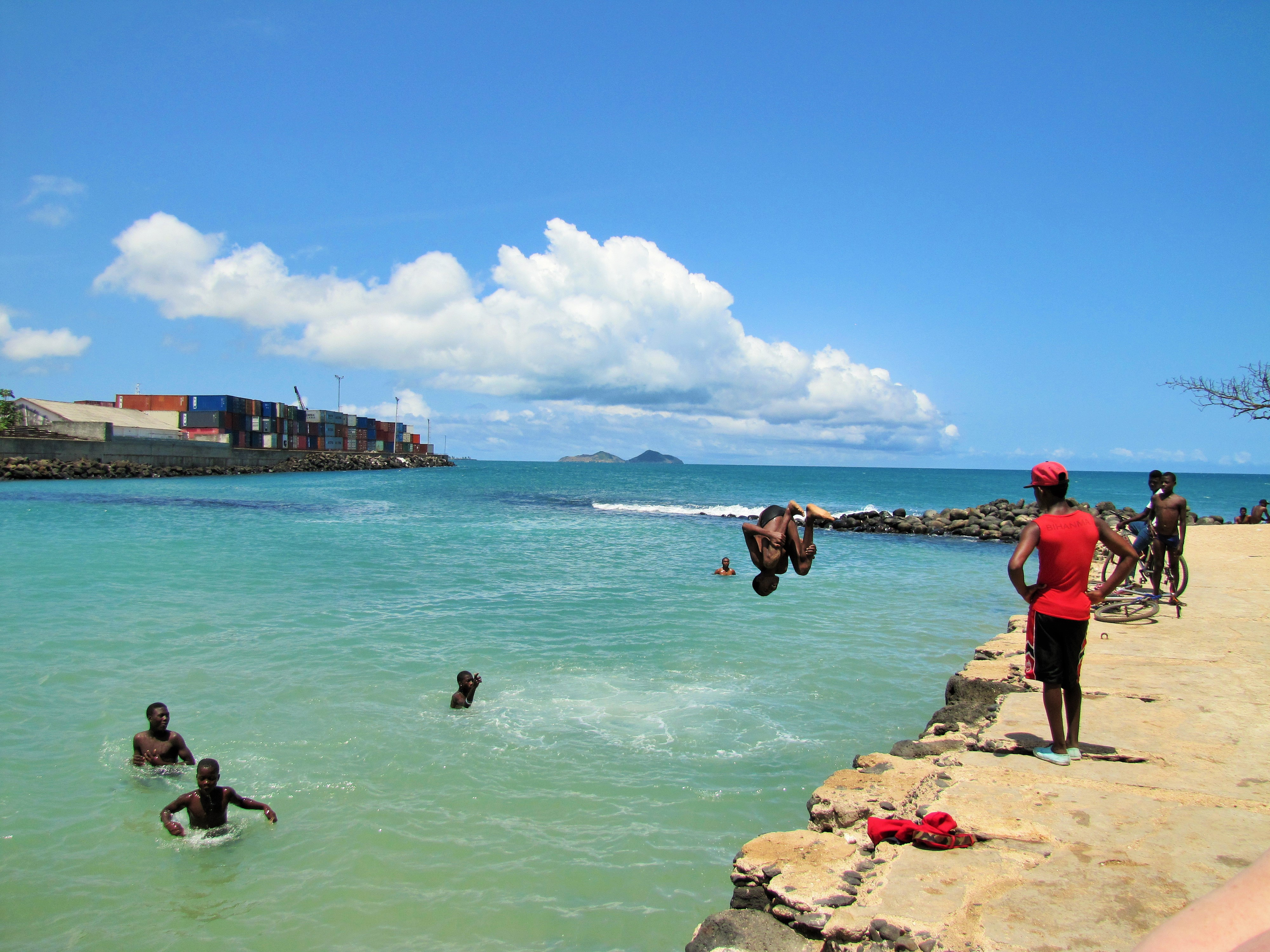
Kids pier jumping

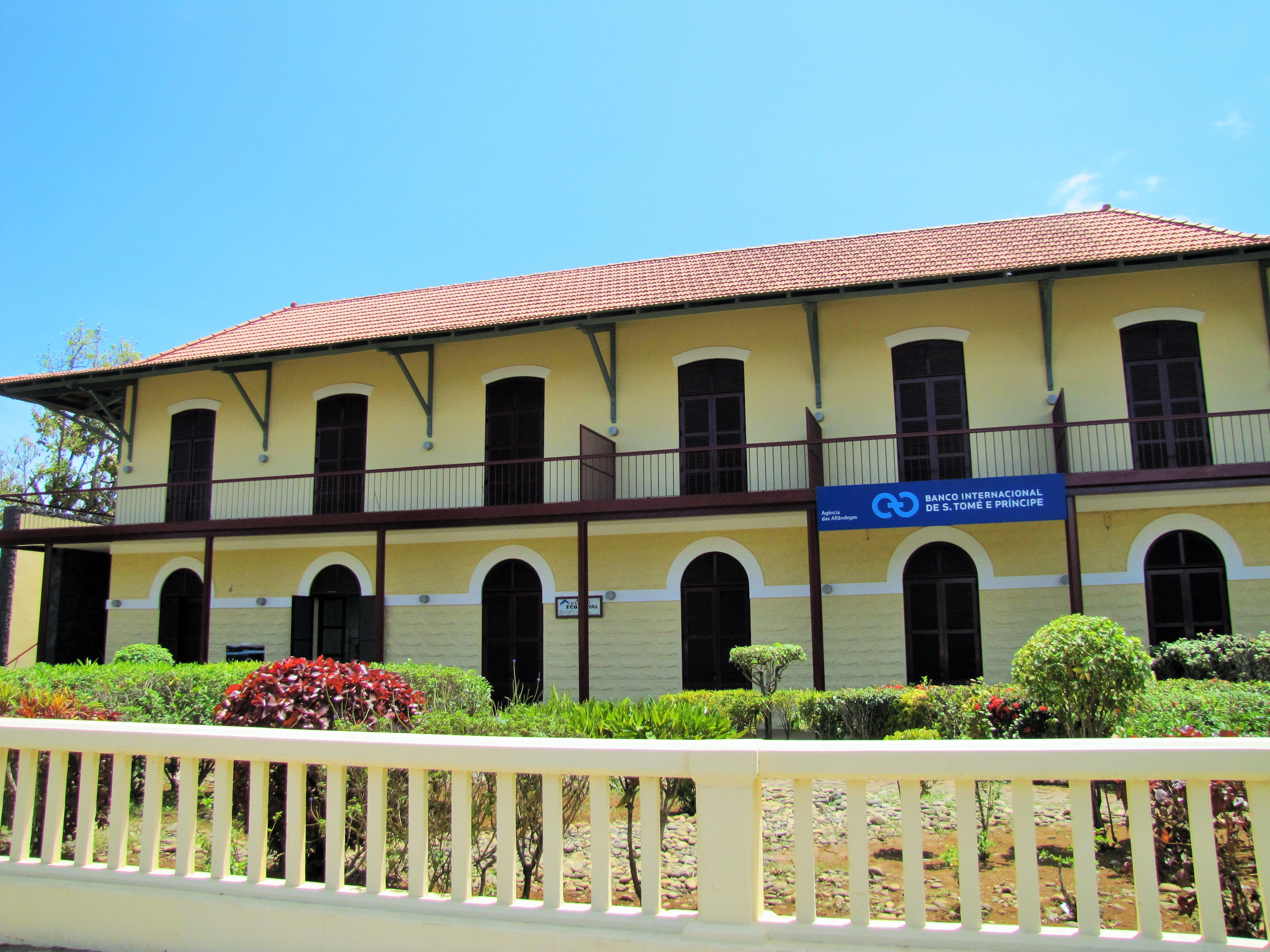
Old seat of Banco Internacional de São Tomé e Príncipe

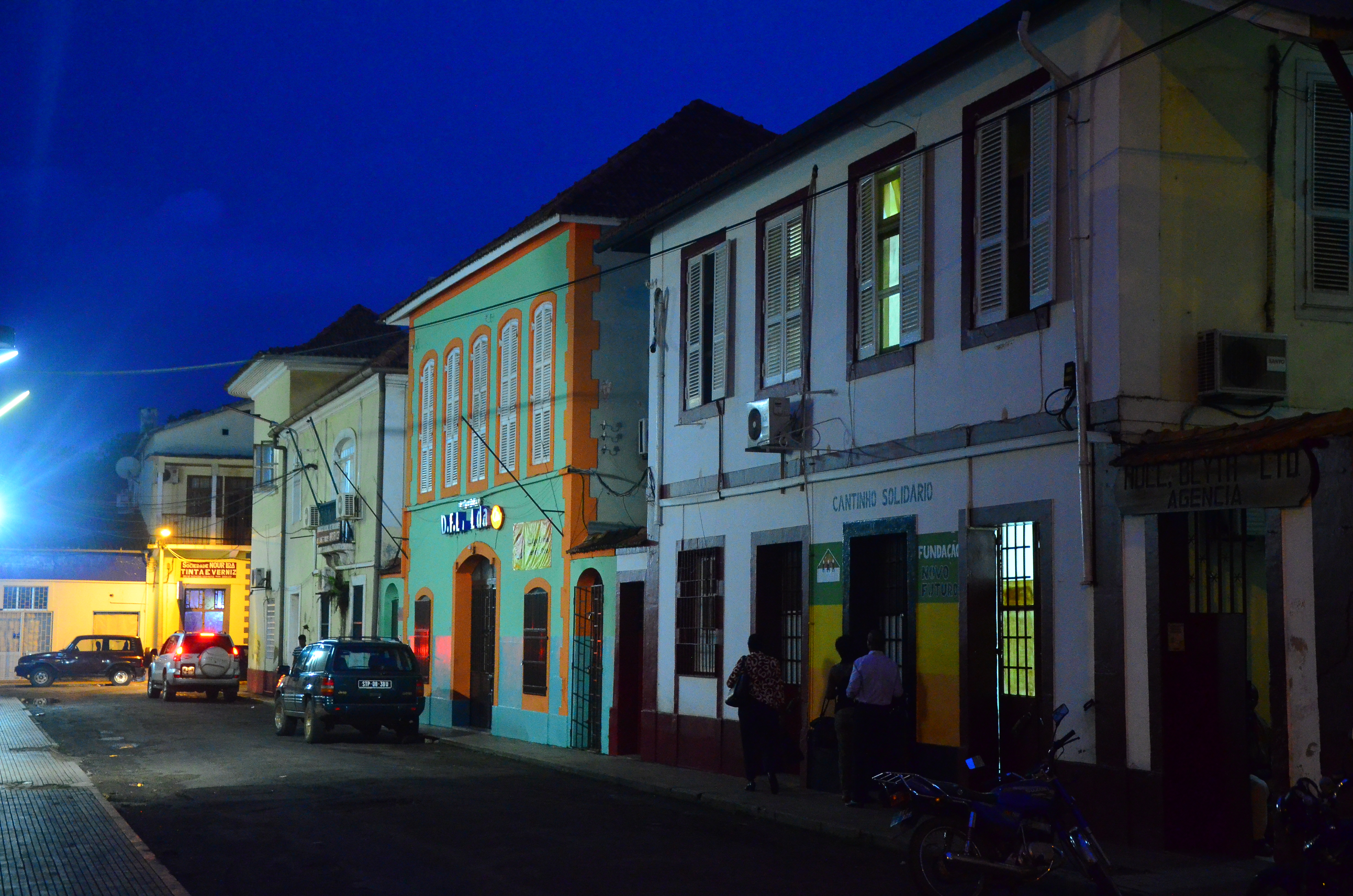
Downtown São Tomé

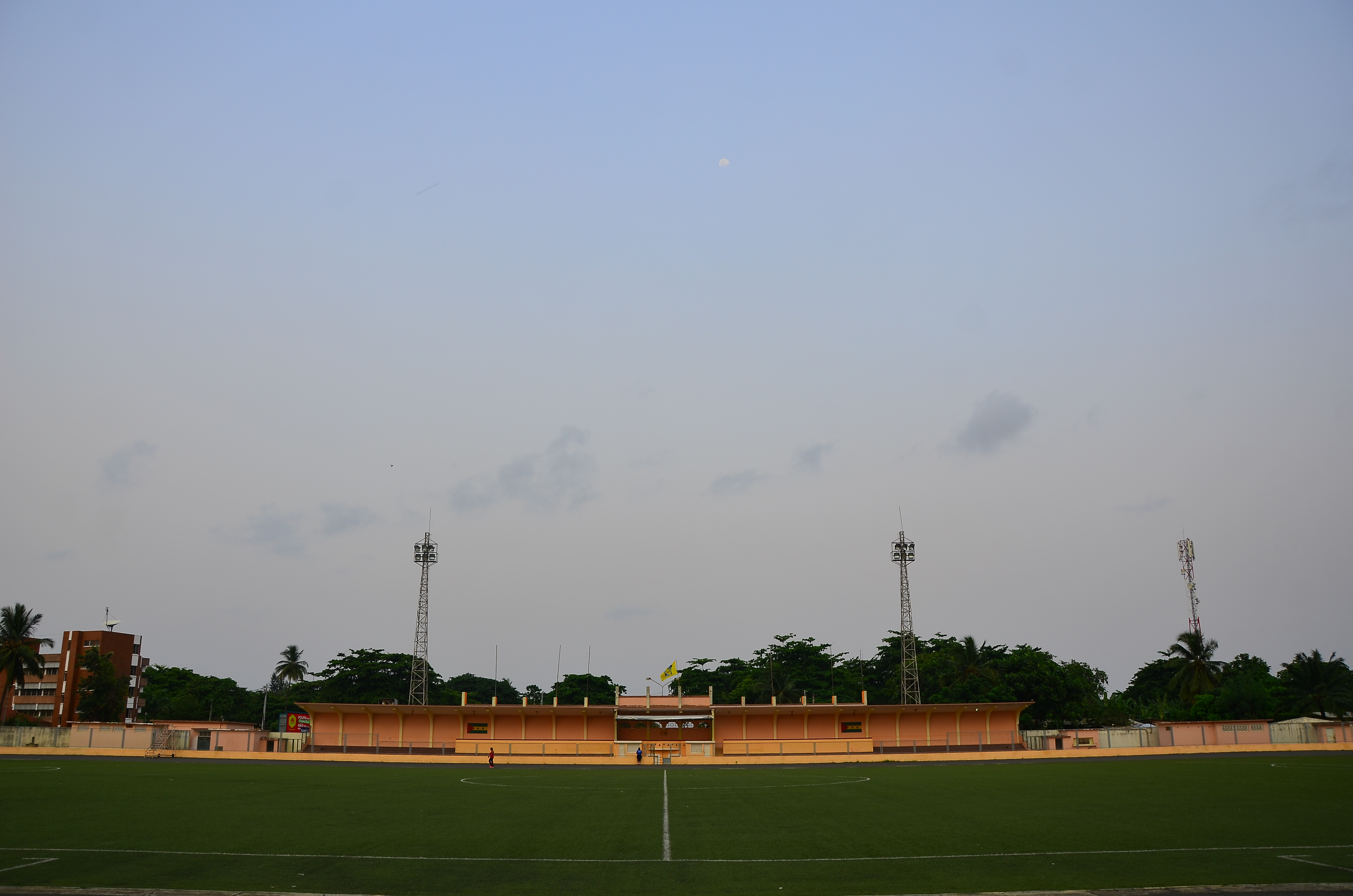
Estádio Nacional 12 de Julho

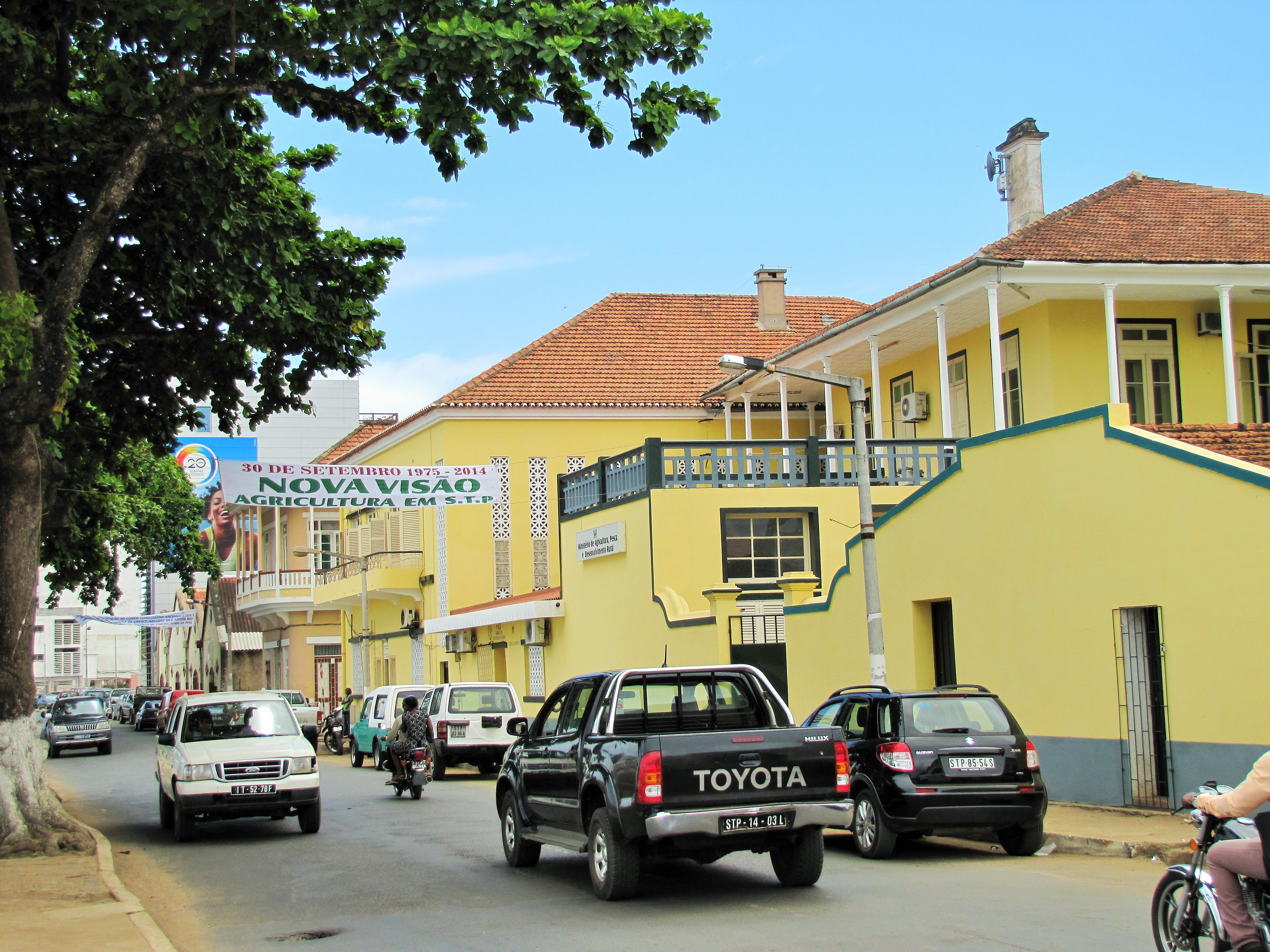
São Tomé, STP

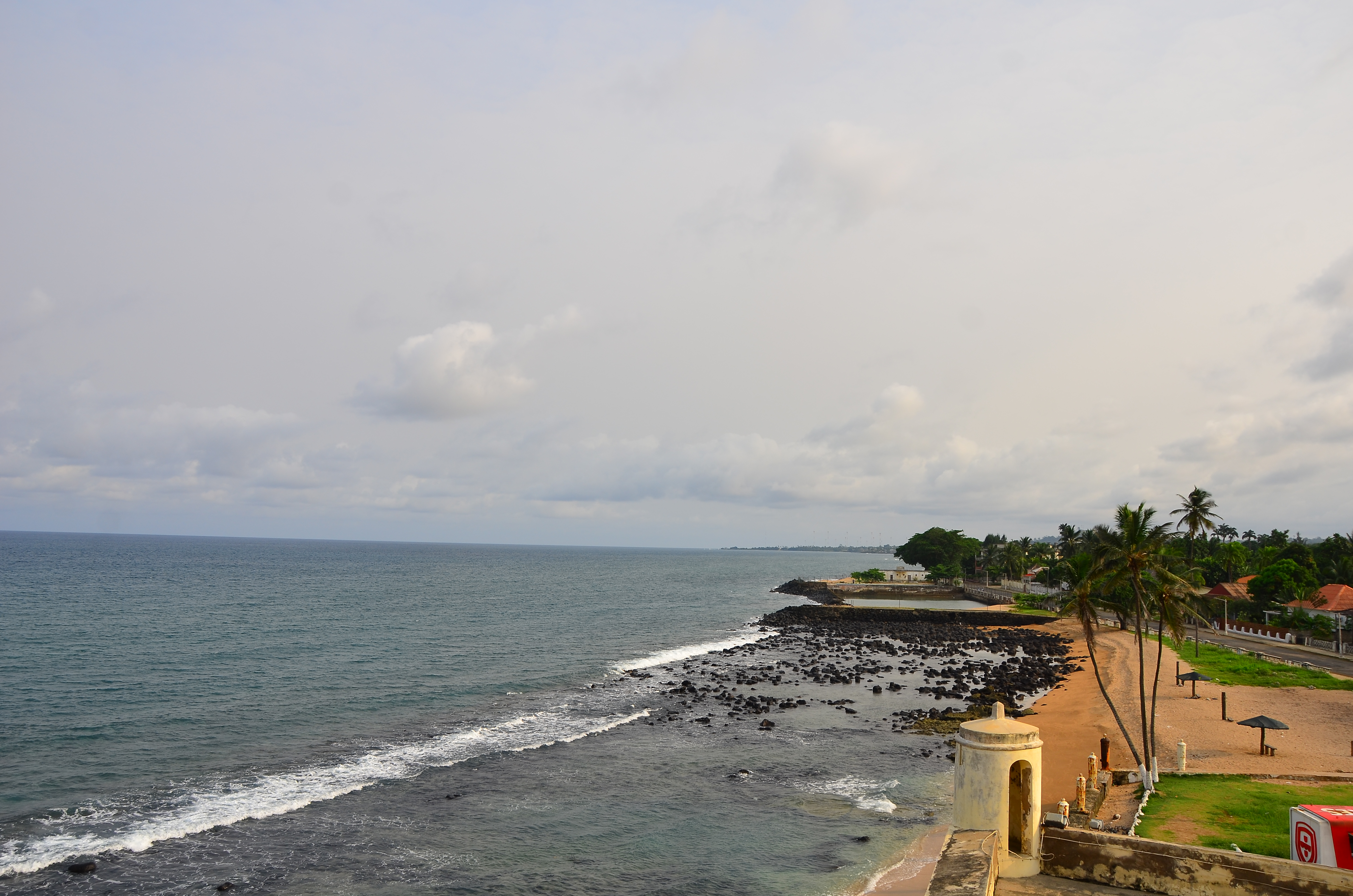
Baía Ana Chaves, São Tomé

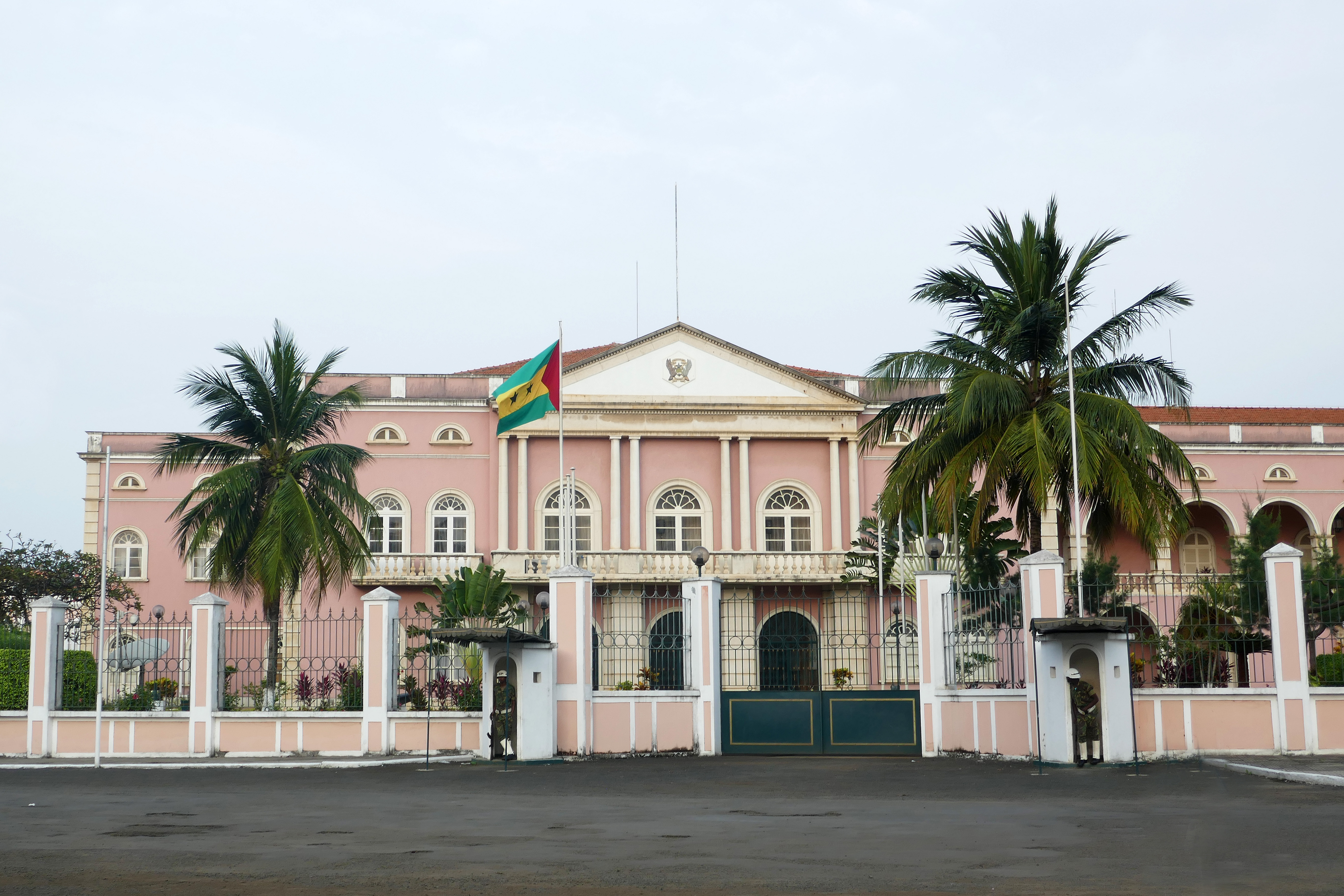
Presidential Palace

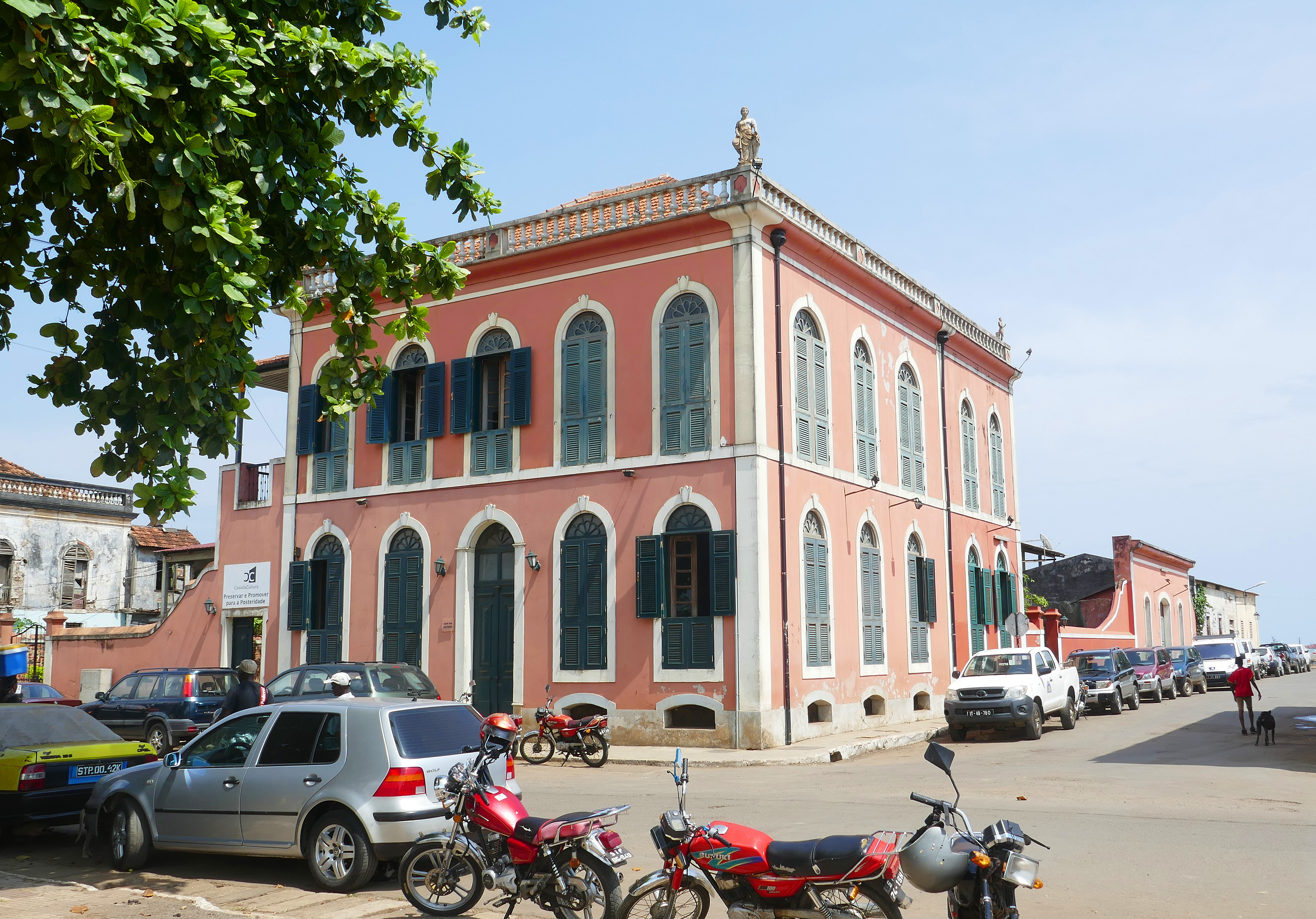
Casa da Cultura de São Tomé

== Notable people ==
- José Vianna da Motta (1868–1948) Portuguese pianist, teacher and composer
- Alfredo Azancot (1872–1937) Portuguese architect who emigrated to Chile
- Almada Negreiros (1893–1970) Portuguese artist, created literature and painting, and developed ballet choreographies
- Francisco José Tenreiro (1921–1963) geographer, poet and writer of the colonial era
- Alda Neves da Graça do Espírito Santo (1926–2010) poet working in Portuguese, who also served in the Santomean government after independence
- Guadalupe de Ceita (born 1929) writer and a doctor and national hero
- Miguel Trovoada (born 1936) was Prime Minister 1975–1979 and President 1991–2001 of São Tomé and Príncipe
- Fradique de Menezes (born 1942) President of São Tomé and Príncipe from 2003 to 2011
- Olinda Beja (born 1946) poet, writer and narrator, emigrated to Portugal and moved to Viseu
- Tomé Vera Cruz (born 1956) Prime Minister of São Tomé and Príncipe from April 2006 to February 2008
- Conceição Lima (born 1961) poet from the town of Santana
- Patrice Trovoada (born 1962) politician, Prime Minister of São Tomé and Príncipe 2008 to June 2008, 2010 to December 2012 and since November 2014
- Aurélio Martins (born 1966) journalist, businessman and politician

=== Sports ===
- Nuno Espírito Santo (born 1974) retired Portuguese footballer, Portuguese association football manager
- Naide Gomes (born 1979) former heptathlete and long jumper, competed in 100 metres hurdles at the 2000 Summer Olympics
- Lasset Costa, (born 1986) footballer
- Yazaldes Nascimento (born 1986) Portuguese athlete, runs the 100 metres, competed in the 2004 Summer Olympics
- Alcino Silva (born 1990) sprint canoer, competed in the 2008 Summer Olympics in Beijing
- Harramiz (born 1990) professional footballer who plays in Portugal
- Zé (born 1991) footballer
- Buly Da Conceição Triste (born 1991) sprint canoeist, competed at the 2016 Summer Olympics
- Faduley (born 1992) footballer in Portugal
- Charles Monteiro (born 1994) footballer who plays in Portugal
- Gilson Costa (born 1996) Portuguese professional footballer
- Romário Leitão (born 1997) long distance runner, competed at the 2016 Summer Olympics in the men's 5000 metres
- Gedson Fernandes (born 1999) Portuguese professional footballer

== International relations ==
São Tomé is twinned with:

- Kingstown, Saint Vincent and the Grenadines
- Luanda, Angola
- Libreville, Gabon
- Accra, Ghana
- Lisbon, Portugal
