= Supreme Court of Justice (São Tomé and Príncipe) =

Coordinates: 0.339744°N 6.733433°E

- Supremo Tribunal de Justiça
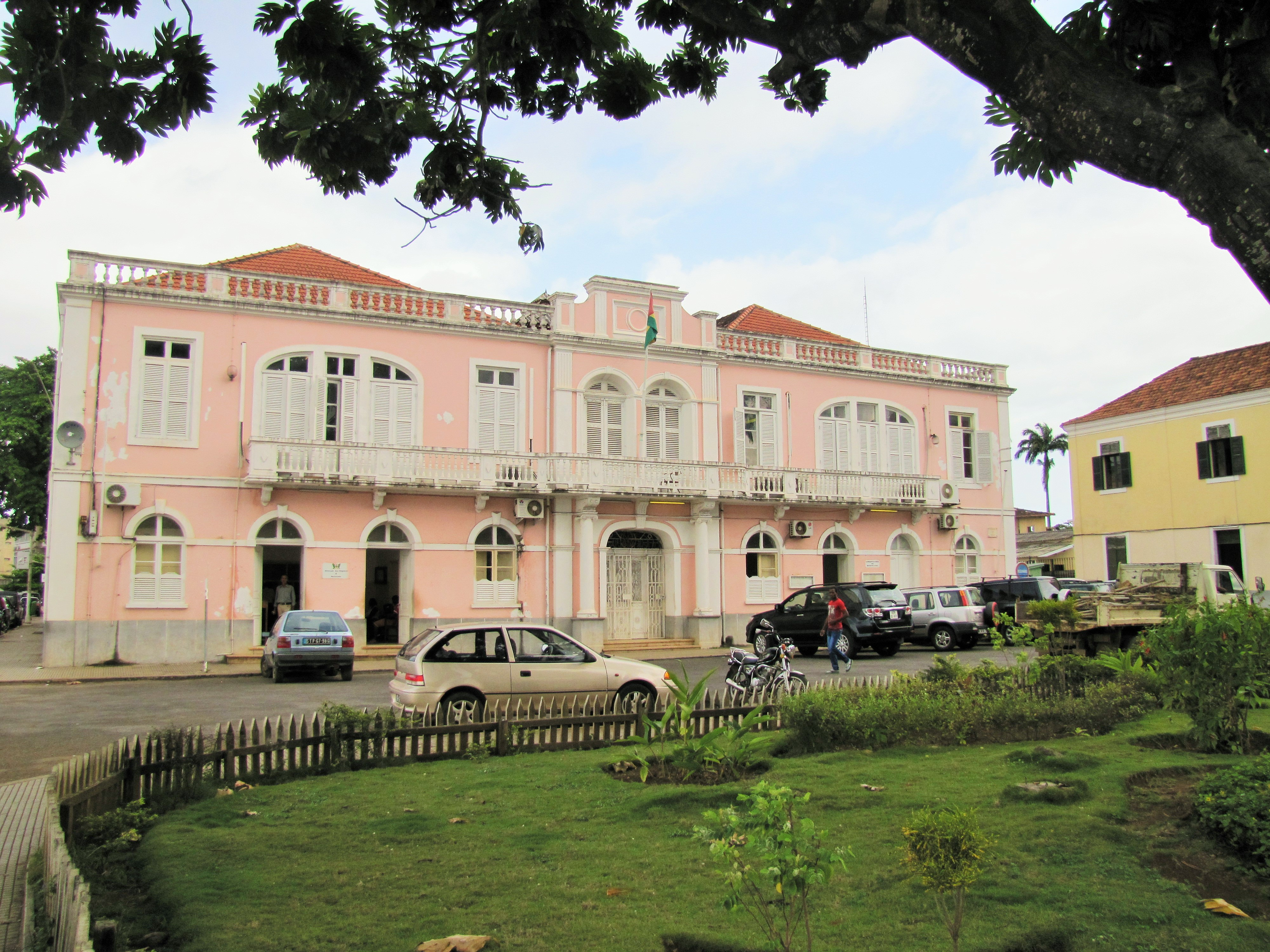
- Established: 1991
- Jurisdiction: São Tomé and Príncipe
- Authorised by: São Tomé and Príncipe Constitution
- Website: www.stj.st

President
- Currently: Manuel Silva Gomes Cravid

The Supreme Court of Justice (Portuguese: Supremo Tribunal de Justiça) is the highest judicial authority of São Tomé and Príncipe. It is located in a historic building in the centre of the capital city of São Tomé, between the Presidential Palace and the waterfront. The Supreme Court consists of five judges, that are appointed by the National Assembly.

The Supreme Court is housed in the former Misericórdia, a church and hospital complex dating from 1504. The present building dates probably from the 17th or 18th century, and was restored in the 1930s.
