= António da Penha de França =

Roman Catholic prelate (1649–1702)

Most Reverend Penha de França
- Bishop of São Tomé e Príncipe
- Church: Catholic Church
- Diocese: Diocese of São Tomé and Príncipe
- In office: 1699–1702
- Predecessor: Timóteo do Sacramento
- Successor: João de Sahagún

Orders
- Consecration: 29 Jun 1700 by João Franco de Oliveira

Personal details
- Born: 6 Nov 1649 Lisbon, Portugal
- Died: 1702 (age 52) São Tomé e Príncipe

Penha de França, O.A.D. (1649–1702) was a Roman Catholic prelate who served as Bishop of São Tomé e Príncipe (1699–1702).

== Biography ==
Penha de França was born in Lisbon, Portugal on 6 Nov 1649 and ordained a priest in the Ordo Augustiniensium Discalceatorum. On 5 Oct 1699, he was appointed during the papacy of Pope Innocent XII as Bishop of São Tomé e Príncipe. On 29 Jun 1700, he was consecrated bishop by João Franco de Oliveira, Archbishop of São Salvador da Bahia. He served as Bishop of São Tomé e Príncipe until his death in 1702.

Catholic Church titles
Preceded by Timóteo do Sacramento	Bishop of São Tomé e Príncipe; 1699–1702	Succeeded by João de Sahagún
