= National Lyceum =

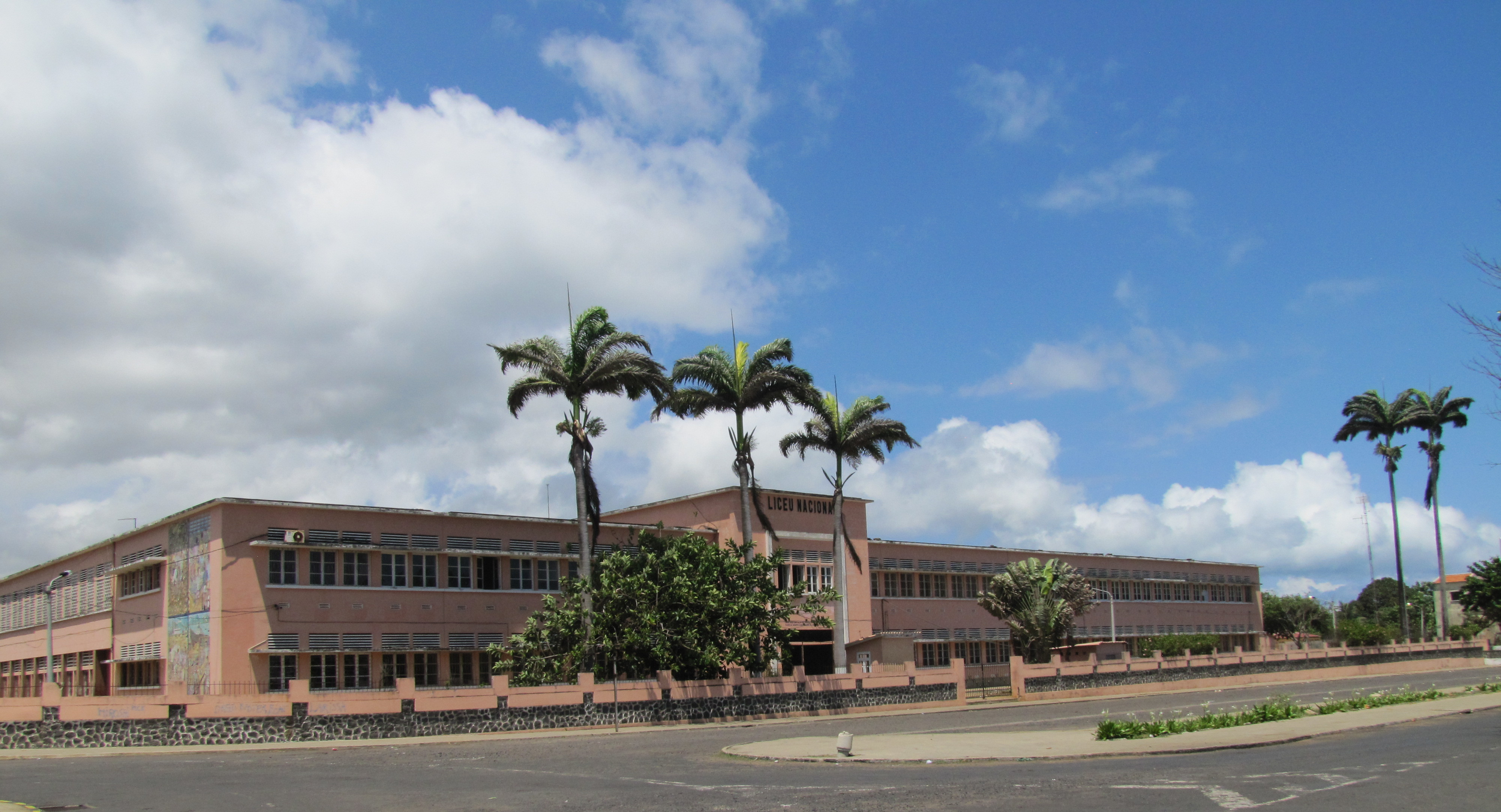
- Liceu Nacional in 2014

Location
- Avenida (Marginal) 12 de Julho; São Tomé, São Tomé Island; São Tomé and Príncipe
- Coordinates: 0°20′21″N 6°44′23″E

Information
- Established: 6 October 1969
- Enrollment: c. 6,000 (2015)

National Lyceum (Liceu Nacional) is a lyceum (secondary school) located at Avenida Marginal 12 Julho in the city of São Tomé, São Tomé and Príncipe. It is one of the oldest secondary schools in the nation. It currently has an estimate of 6,000 students. The lyceum is located on the seafront, east of the city centre.

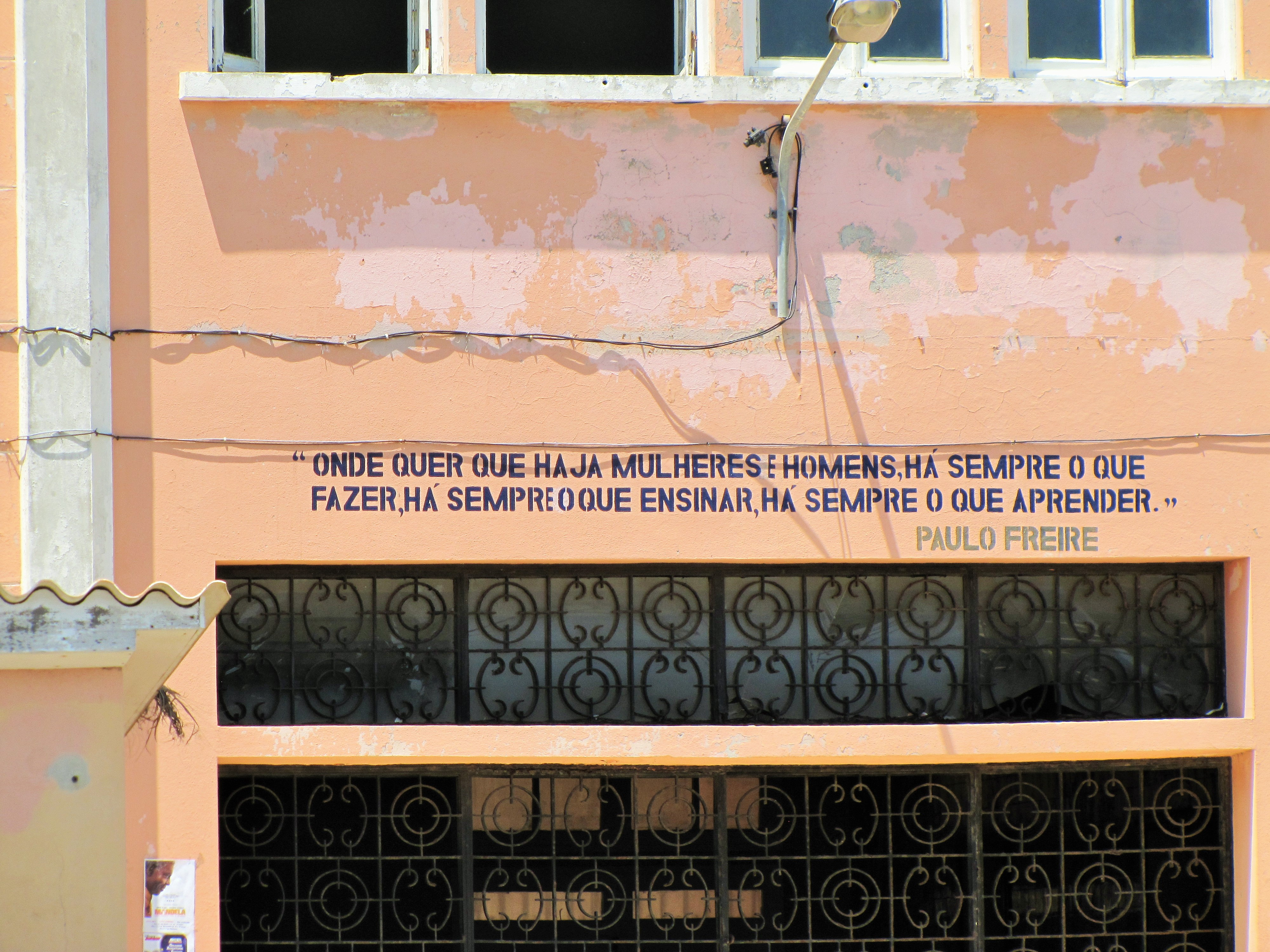
Entrance into the lyceum with a plaque of a quote by Paulo Freire

The lyceum was opened on 6 October 1969 as a technical school, Escola Técnica Silva e Cunha. The building was designed by architect Mário de Oliveira, who was also responsible for the 1962 urbanisation plan for São Tomé. It became a liceu after independence. For 36 years, until 2011, it was the only high school in the country.

== Notable alumni ==
- Tomé Vera Cruz, Prime Minister of São Tomé and Príncipe from 2006 to 2008, class of 1975

== See also ==
- List of buildings and structures in São Tomé and Príncipe
