= Manuel António Mendes dos Santos =

Manuel António Mendes dos Santos CMF
- Bishop Emeritus of São Tomé and Príncipe
- Church: Catholic Church
- Diocese: Diocese of São Tomé and Príncipe
- In office: 1 December 2006 – 13 July 2022
- Predecessor: Abílio Rodas de Sousa Ribas
- Successor: João de Ceita Nazaré

Orders
- Ordination: 13 June 1985 by António de Castro Xavier Monteiro
- Consecration: 17 February 2007 by José Saraiva Martins

Personal details
- Born: 20 March 1960 (age 66) São Joaninho, Viseu District, Portugal

Manuel António Mendes dos Santos, CMF (born 20 March 1960) has been the Roman Catholic bishop of the Diocese of São Tomé and Príncipe since 1 December 2006.

Mendes was ordained a priest on June 13, 1985. He succeeded Abílio Rodas de Sousa Ribas, CSSp in the São Tomé and Príncipe see in 2007. He resigned in 2022.
