= National Library of São Tomé and Príncipe =

Coordinates: 0.3401°N 6.7371°E

- Biblioteca Nacional de São Tomé e Príncipe
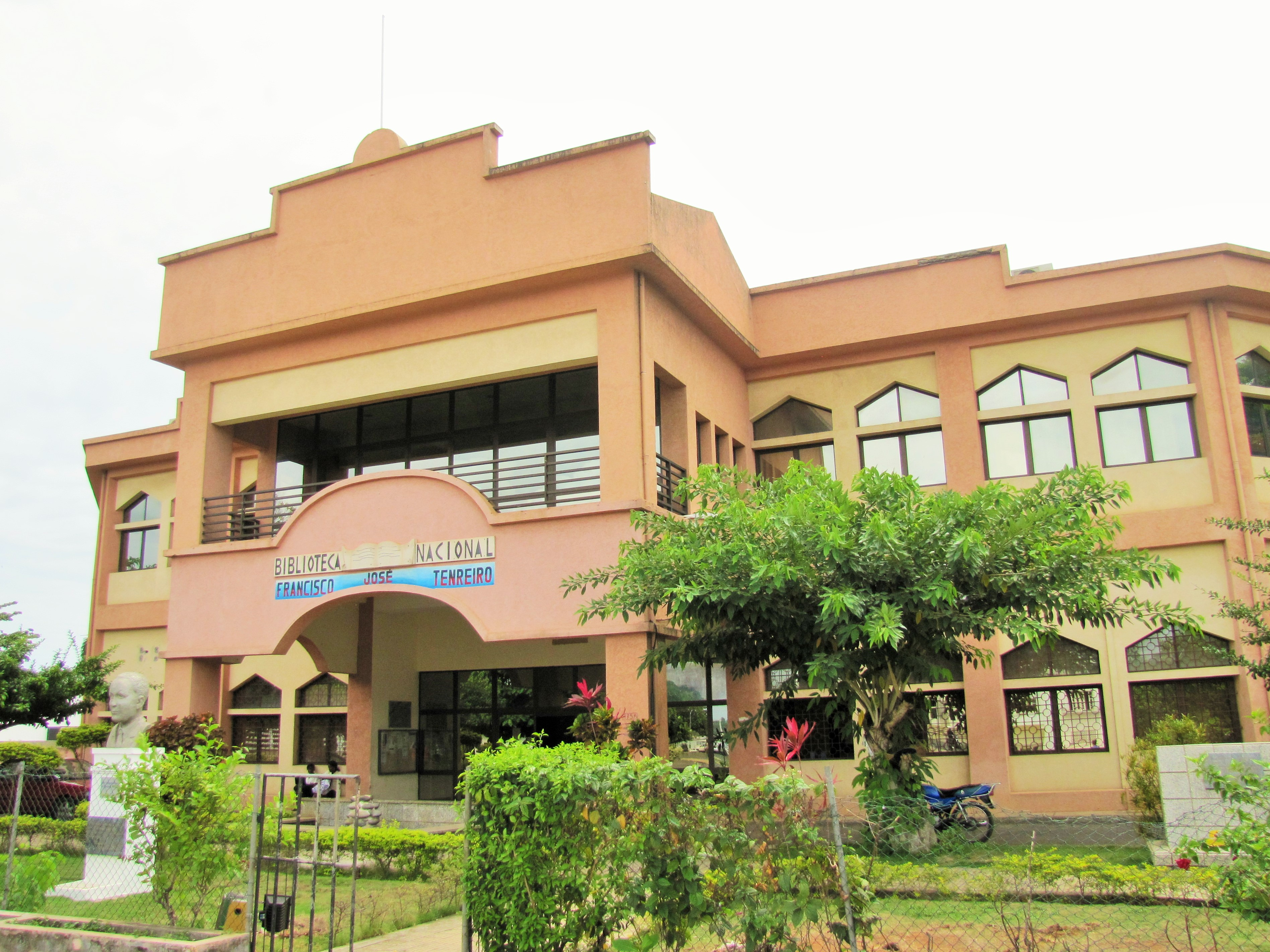
- Location: São Tomé, São Tomé and Príncipe
- Established: May 2002

Collection
- Legal deposit: yes

Other information
- Director: Nazaré de Ceita

The National Library of São Tomé and Príncipe (Portuguese: Biblioteca Nacional de São Tomé e Príncipe) is located in the capital city of São Tomé in São Tomé and Príncipe. It is responsible for the technical coordination of public libraries and the promotion of books and reading. It is also the legal deposit of the country, according to a law created in 1952 during colonial rule.

== History ==
Before independence in 1975, the library of the São Tomé town hall was the most important library in the colony housing about 5,000 books. Since independence, more services were housed in the town hall, and as a result, the library fell in decay and was eventually closed. The gap this left was partly filled by the Francisco José Tenreiro Reading Room, that was the only public library in the country for over a decade.

Since the 1990s, libraries have emerged in the district capitals with international aid. The itinerant libraries set up by the Portuguese Calouste Gulbenkian Foundation in 2000 brought books to more communities. In 1994, the library of the National Assembly was established. Its initial collection was based on the former collection of the town hall library. Finally, the public National Library was opened in May 2002, financed by China.

In March 2015, the National Library began a cooperation with the University of Minas Gerais (UMG) from Belo Horizonte, Brazil, began its project to promote reading for children and teenagers. International children's and youth literature in the Portuguese language are driven in vans and taken to villages and made available in small villages.
