= Our Lady of Grace Cathedral, São Tomé =

Our Lady of Grace Cathedral
- Sé Catedral de Nossa Senhora da Graça
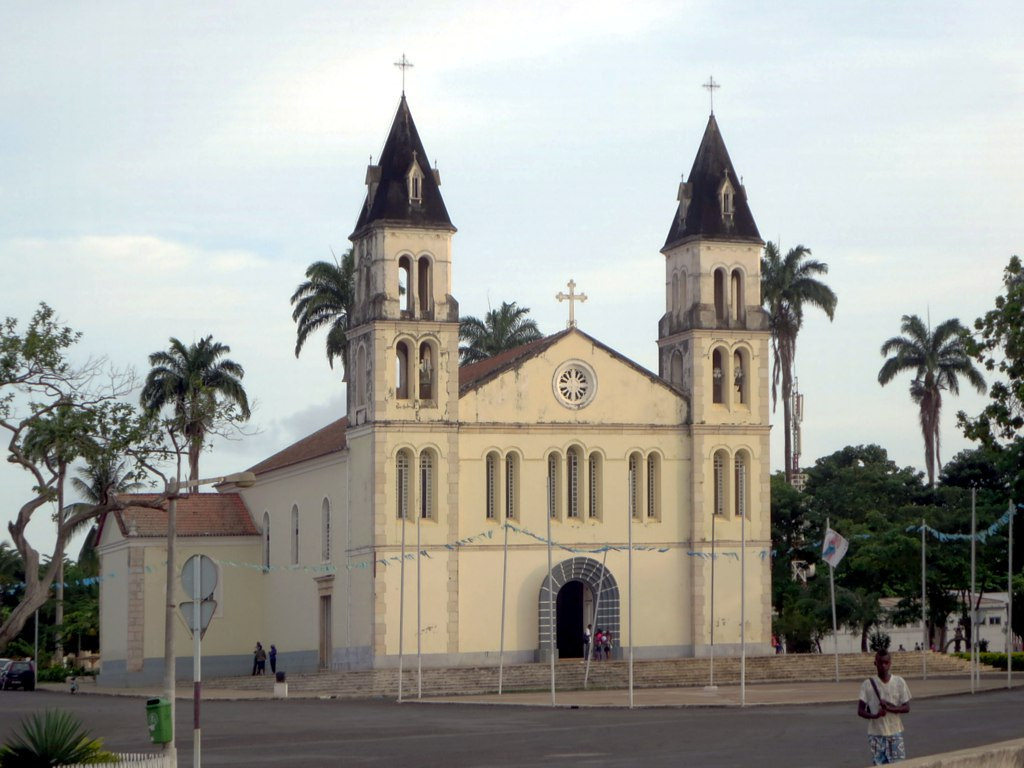

- Location within São Tomé
- 0.3384°N 6.7327°E
- Location: São Tomé
- Country: São Tomé and Príncipe
- Denomination: Catholic Church

Administration
- Diocese: Diocese of São Tomé and Príncipe

The Our Lady of Grace Cathedral (Portuguese: Sé Catedral de Nossa Senhora da Graça), also called Cathedral of São Tomé, is a Catholic church in the city of São Tomé, capital of the African and island country of São Tomé and Príncipe. It is the cathedral of the Roman Catholic Diocese of São Tomé and Príncipe. It stands at Praça do Povo (People's Square) in the city centre, close to the Presidential Palace.

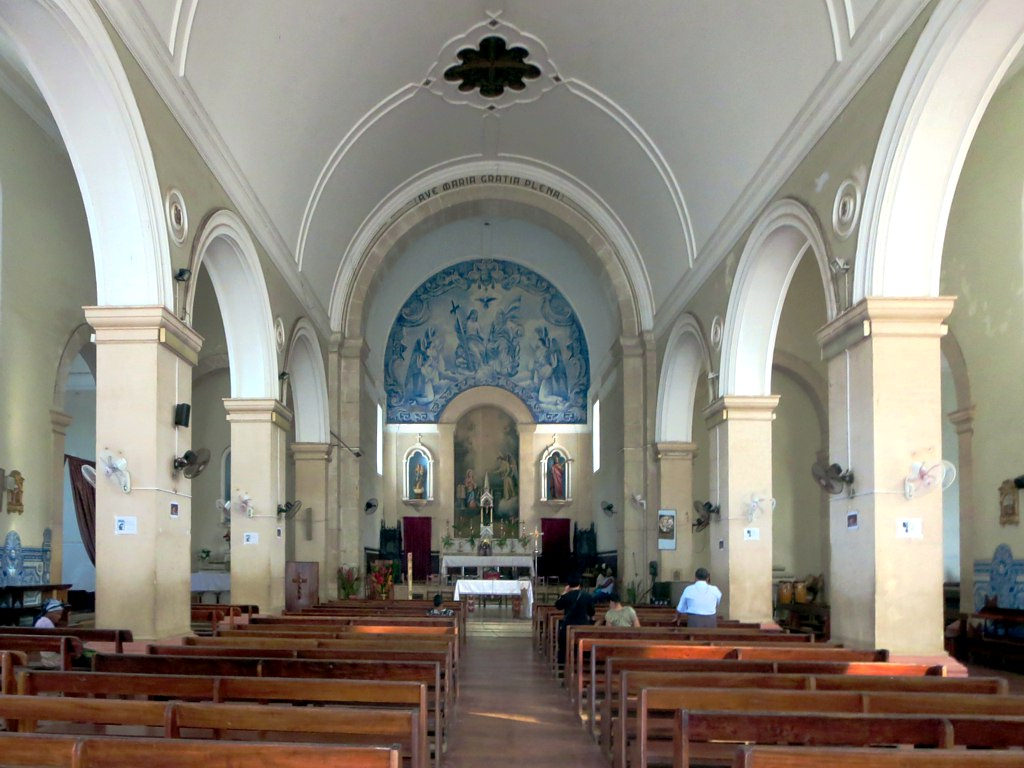
Interior view

Construction of the first church of Our Lady of Grace was started at the end of the fifteenth century under Captain Álvaro de Caminha. This church was situated near the present cathedral. It became the seat of a diocese in 1534. The building was reconstructed between 1576 and 1578, during the reign of King Sebastian of Portugal. In 1784, it was in poor condition with the frontispiece broken. In 1814 it was rebuilt at the initiative of the local population. The last modification was made in 1956, when the church was remodeled in an eclectic revival style, with a neo-romanesque main façade.

== See also ==
- Roman Catholicism in São Tomé and Príncipe
- List of buildings and structures in São Tomé and Príncipe
