= Diocese of São Tomé and Príncipe =

Catholic diocese in São Tomé and Príncipe

Coordinates: 0.3406°N 6.7346°E

Diocese of São Tomé e Príncipe Dioecesis Sancti Thomae in Insula

Location
- Country: São Tomé and Príncipe
- Metropolitan: Immediately subject to the Holy See

Statistics
- Area: 1,001 km^{2} (386 sq mi)
- Population: Total; Catholics: (as of 2015); 195,000; 112,000 (57.4%)

Information
- Rite: Latin Rite

Current leadership
- Pope: Leo XIV
- Bishop: João de Ceita Nazaré
- Bishops emeritus: Manuel António Mendes dos Santos, CMF

The Roman Catholic Diocese of São Tomé and Príncipe (Latin: Sancti Thomae in Insula) is a diocese, immediately subject to the Holy See, with its seat in the city of São Tomé in São Tomé and Príncipe. It covers the territory of the Republic of São Tomé and Príncipe. As of 2015, 112,000 or 57.4% of the inhabitants of São Tomé and Príncipe were Catholic.

== History ==
The diocese was established on 3 November 1534, as the Diocese of Tomé from Metropolitan Archdiocese of Funchal in Portugal. The diocese initially included the Portuguese controlled or Christian areas of southwestern Africa. In 1596, it lost territory to the new diocese of São Salvador do Congo (today's Angola). In 1818 it lost territory to the new Apostolic Vicariate of Cape of Good Hope (today's South Africa). In 1842 it lost territory to the new Apostolic Prefecture of the Two Guineas and Senegambia (much of central and west Africa). In 1924, the diocese was renamed Diocese of São Tomé. In 1957 it was renamed to its current name Diocese of São Tomé and Príncipe.

== Churches ==
The cathedral is Sé Catedral de Nossa Senhora da Graça (Cathedral of Our Lady of Grace) in São Tomé.

== Bishops ==
The bishops of the Diocese of (São) Tomé (and Príncipe):

- Bishops of Tomé (Roman rite)
  - Bishop Diogo Ortiz de Vilhegas (1533–1540)
  - Bishop Bernardo da Cruz, O.P. (1540–1553)
  - Bishop Gaspar Cão, O.S.A. (1554–1572)
  - Bishop Martinho de Ulhoa, O. Cist. (1578–1592)
  - Bishop Francisco de Vilanova, O.F.M. (1592–1602)
  - Bishop António Valente, O.P. (1604–1608)
  - Bishop Jerónimo de Quintanilha, O. Cist. (1611–1614)
  - Bishop Pedro de São Agostinho Figueira de Cunha Lobo, O.S.A. (1615–1620)
  - Bishop Francisco de Soveral, O.S.A. (5 October 1623 – 8 February 1627)
  - Bishop Domingos da Assunção, O.P. (1627–1632)
  - Bishop Manoel a Nativitate do Nascimento, O.S.H. (1674–1677)
  - Bishop Bernardo de Santa Maria Zuzarte de Andrade, C.R.S.A. (1677–1680)
  - Bishop Sebastião de São Paulo, O.F.M. (1687–1690)
  - Bishop Timóteo do Sacramento, O.S.P.P.E. (2 January 1693 – 17 December 1696)
  - Bishop António da Penha de França, O.A.D. (1699–1702)
  - Bishop João de Sahagún, O.A.D. (1709–1730)
  - Bishop Leandro de Santo Agostinho da Piedade, O.A.D. (1739–1740)
  - Bishop Tomas Luiz da Conceição, O.A.D. (1742–1744)
  - Bishop Ludovico das Chagas, O.S.A. (1745–1747)
  - Bishop António Nogueira (bishop) (1753–1758)
  - Bishop Vicente do Espirito Santo, O.A.D. (1 March 1779 – 17 December 1782)
  - Bishop Domingo Rosario, O.P. (1782–1788)
  - Bishop Rafael de Castello de Vide, O.F.M. (1794–1800)
  - Bishop Caetano Veloso, O.F.M. (24 May 1802 – September 1803)
  - Bishop Custodio d'Almeida, O.A.D. (26 June 1805 – 23 March 1812)
  - Bishop Bartholomeu de Martyribus Maya, O.C.D. (8 March 1816 – 10 November 1819), appointed Prelate of Mozambico
- Bishops of São Tomé and Príncipe (Roman rite)
  - Archbishop Moisés Alves de Pinho, C.S.Sp. (18 January 1941 – 17 November 1966); he is listed here as Archbishop because he is listed concurrently as Archbishop of Luanda, Angola.
  - Bishop Abílio Rodas de Sousa Ribas, C.S.Sp. (3 December 1984 – 1 December 2006)
  - Bishop Manuel António Mendes dos Santos, C.M.F. (1 December 2006 – 13 July 2022)
  - Bishop João de Ceita Nazaré (since 9 January 2024)

== Ecclesiastical decoration ==
- Cross of São Tomé (Catholic ecclesiastical decoration)
