= Francisco de Soveral =

Portuguese prelate

Francisco de Soveral O.S.A.
- Bishop of Angola e Congo
- Church: Catholic Church
- Diocese: Diocese of Angola e Congo
- In office: 8 February 1627 – 5 January 1642
- Predecessor: Simão Mascarenhas
- Successor: Pedro Sanches
- Previous post: Bishop of São Tomé e Príncipe (1623-1627)

Orders
- Consecration: April 1624 by Fernando Martins Mascarenhas

Personal details
- Born: c. 1565 Sernancelhe, Beira, Kingdom of Portugal, Iberian Union
- Died: 5 January 1642 (aged 76–77) Portuguese Angola, Portuguese Empire

Francisco de Soveral (c. 1565 in Sernancelhe, Portugal – 5 January 1642 in Angola) was a Portuguese prelate.

== Biography ==
Father Francisco de Soveral was the son of Pedro de Soveral and Maria de Almeida, he was the brother of D. Roque de Soveral.

He visited the Santa Cruz de Coimbra Monastery and was the Canon of the Order of St. Augustine in 1588, he attended at the University of Coimbra in 1595, where he became known as D. Francisco de Soveral, father of Santa Cruz, doctorate in theology at the Faculty of Theology at the same university. On 10 June 1619, he was deputy of the Table of the Holy Office and so on.

On 5 October 1623, he was the 9th Bishop of São Tomè and was the 5th Bishop of Angola and Congo from 8 February 1627 to 1642.

He died on 5 January 1642 and was buried at Our Lady of Victory Church, Massangano and was transferred to Luanda Cathedral.

== Sources ==
- Manuel Abranches de Soveral, Ascendências Visienses. Ensaio genealógico sobre a nobreza de Viseu. Séculos XIV a XVII (Visonian Descendants: Genealogic Essay on the Nobles of Viseu, 14th and 15th Centuries), Porto 2004, ISBN 972-97430-6-1.

Catholic Church titles
Preceded by Pedro de Santo Agostinho Figueira de Cunha Lobo	Bishop of São Tomé; 1623–1627	Succeeded by Domingos da Assunção
Political offices
Preceded by Simão Mascarenhas	Bishop of Angola and the Congo; 1627–1642	Succeeded by Pedro Sanches Farinha
