= Catholic Church in São Tomé and Príncipe =

The Catholic Church has been active in the São Tomé and Príncipe since the arrival of priests in 1493. The Roman Catholic Diocese of São Tomé and Príncipe was established as the Diocese of Tomé by Pope Paul III in 1534, and is currently led by Bishop João de Ceita Nazaré since 2024. Catholicism is the largest religion in São Tomé and Príncipe.

== History ==
Catholic priests first arrived on São Tomé Island in 1493. Missionaries from the Order of Saint Augustine arrived in 1499. Bishop Pedro da Cunha Lobo worked to eliminate Judaism on the island upon arriving in 1621.

Pope Paul III established the Diocese of Tomé in 1534. The Diocese of Tomé held jurisdiction from Cape Palmas to the Cape of Good Hope. It was subordinate to the Roman Catholic Diocese of Funchal until 1597, to the Patriarchate of Lisbon until 1677, and then the Roman Catholic Archdiocese of São Salvador da Bahia.

On 15 August 2022, an agreement was signed between the Catholic Church and São Tomé and Príncipe which granted legal personhood to the church.

== Population ==
King Manuel I of Portugal ordered in 1514, that new slaves in the area had to be baptised within six months of their purchase. In 1526, free black people were allowed to form the Catholic Brotherhood of Our Lady of the Rosary. King John III of Portugal gave this brotherhood the right to demand and obtain freedom for its enslaved members.

The Catholic Church claims that 54% of the population is Catholic in 2023. The United States estimated that 55.7% of São Tomé and Príncipe was Catholic in 2012.

== Division ==
- Roman Catholic Diocese of São Tomé and Príncipe
  - Apostolic Nunciature to São Tomé and Príncipe

== Leadership ==
- Manuel António Mendes dos Santos (2007–2022)
- João de Ceita Nazaré (2024–present)

== See also ==
- Religion in São Tomé and Príncipe

== Works cited ==
=== Books ===
- Gorsky, Jeffrey (2015). Exiles in Sepharad: The Jewish Millennium in Spain. University of Nebraska Press. ISBN 9780827612419.
- Law, Robin; Schwarz, Suzanne; Strickrodt, Silke, eds. (2013). Commercial Agriculture, the Slave Trade and Slavery in Atlantic Africa. Boydell & Brewer. ISBN 9781782041788.

=== Journals ===
- Garfield, Robert (1990). "Public Christians, Secret Jews: Religion and Political Conflict on São Tomé Island in the Sixteenth and Seventeenth Centuries". Sixteenth Century Journal. 21 (4). University of Chicago Press: 645–654. doi:10.2307/2542190. JSTOR 2542190.

=== News ===
- "Holy See signs agreement with São Tomé and Príncipe". Vatican News. 16 August 2022. Archived from the original on 13 July 2025.
- Isenjia, Silas (14 July 2022). "Pope Francis Accepts Resignation of Bishop of São Tomé and Principe Diocese Aged 62". Catholic News Agency. Archived from the original on 13 July 2025.
- Vissesse, João (10 January 2024). ""I ask for your prayers": Newly Appointed Catholic Bishop of São Tomé and Príncipe Diocese". Catholic News Agency. Archived from the original on 13 July 2025.

=== Web ===
- "2023 Report on International Religious Freedom: Sao Tome and Principe". United States Department of State. Archived from the original on 13 July 2025.
