= Presidential Palace, São Tomé =

Presidential Palace of São Tomé e Príncipe
- Palácio Presidencial de São Tomé e Príncipe
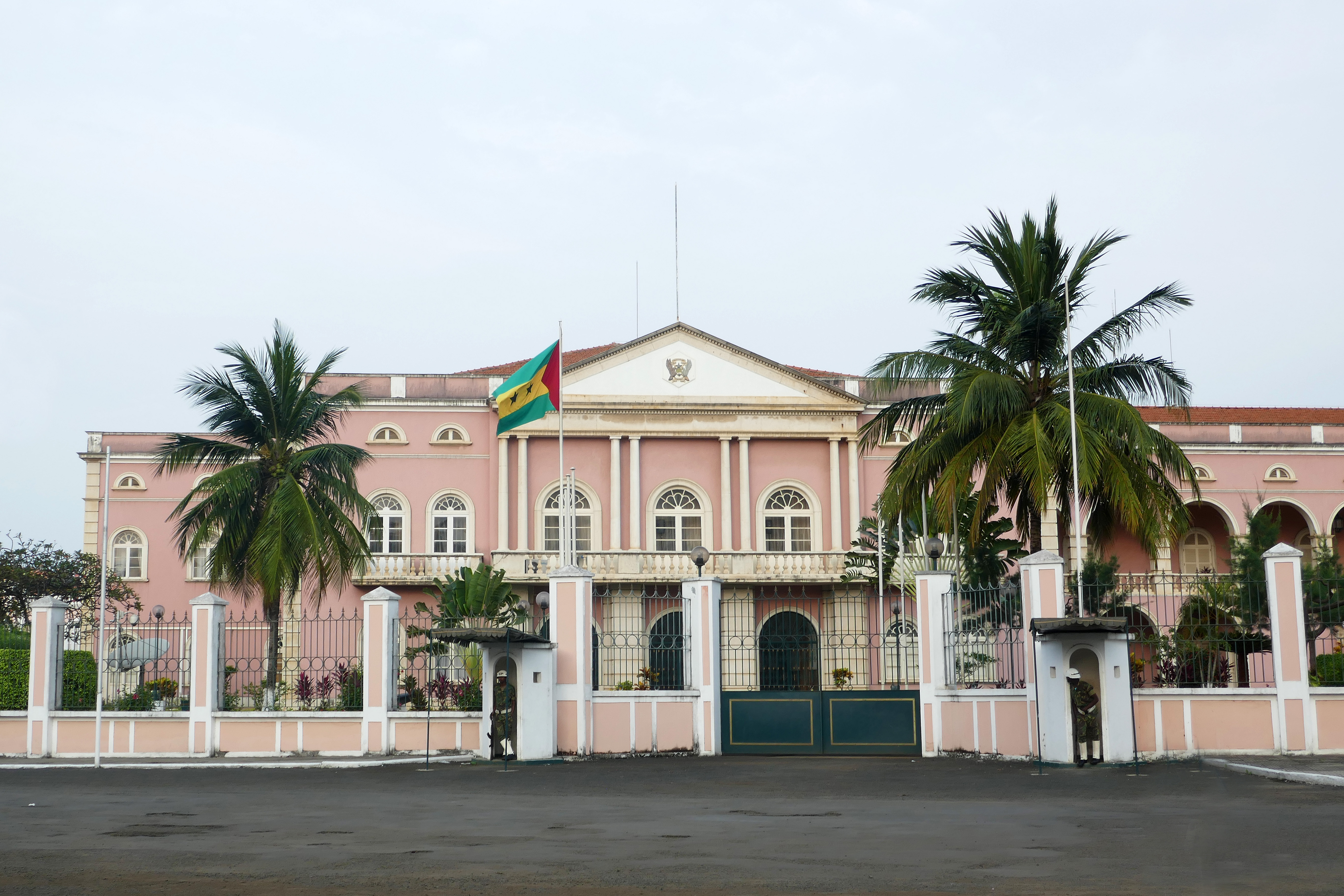

- Location within São Tomé
- Former names: Palácio do Governo de São Tomé
- Alternative names: Palácio do Povo

General information
- Architectural style: Neoclassical
- Location: São Tomé, São Tomé and Príncipe
- Coordinates: 0.339062°N 6.733215°E
- Estimated completion: between 1844 and 1885
- Renovated: 1954

Technical details
- Floor count: 2

Renovating team
- Architect: Eurico Pinto Lopes

The Presidential Palace of São Tomé e Príncipe (Portuguese: Palácio Presidencial de São Tomé e Príncipe, also known as Palácio do Povo) is the official residence of the president of São Tomé and Príncipe and located in the capital, São Tomé. The 19th-century Portuguese colonial style structure formerly served as the residence of the governor of Portuguese São Tomé and Príncipe, until 1975 when the country achieved independence.

== Structure and location ==
The Presidential Palace is a large, L-shaped mansion surrounded by a large garden. The palace is two stories and has a rose-pink façade with simple neoclassical elements. It is surrounded by pink concrete columns and a high iron fence with a closely guarded entrance. It is located next to Praça do Povo (Square of the People) between Avenida da Independência and Avenida 12 de Julho with its principal façade facing Rua de St. António do Príncipe. It is in close proximity to Our Lady of Grace Cathedral and a block from Ana Chaves Bay.

== Construction ==
The exact date of construction of the Presidential Palace is unknown. It is built on the site where Álvaro Caminha, an early administrator of Portuguese São Tomé and Príncipe, ordered the construction of the Torre do Capitão (Captain's Tower) between 1492 and 1493. The tower fell into ruin, and Cunha Matos described a government building on the former tower site in 1835; he describes the palace as spacious but poorly furnished. A building appears in a drawing on the site in 1844 that corresponds to Cunha Matos' description, but of a different design than the current Presidential Palace. The current structure appears in a photograph dated 1885. João Sousa Morais and Joana Bastos Malheiro, researchers on the architectural history of São Tomé e Príncipe, propose that the structure was built in the intervening period.

The building was known from its construction as the Palácio do Governo de São Tomé (Palace of the Governor of São Tomé), or more simply as the Palácio do Governo and was one of the few buildings in the colony in workable condition at the end of the 18th century. It was built as a mansion in a simple classical style typical of the Portuguese overseas territories, with two stories and a rose-pink façade.

== Renovation ==
The structure was upgraded during the Portuguese Estado Novo in the final stage of the colonial period. The Portuguese Town Planning Committee for the Overseas Territories (Gabinete de Urbanização do Ultramar, GUU) carried out urban survey and constructed monuments, buildings, and housing to promote the Portuguese state across all overseas colonies. One project of the GUU was the upgrade of the Palácio do Governo. Eurico Pinto Lopes, a Portuguese architect, supervised the renovation of the palace in 1954. The addition of neoclassical building elements, which included window ornamentation, columns along the spans of the building, and a main staircase at the entrance, were used "to give monumentality to the building."

== Access ==
The Presidential Palace is not open to the public, and photography of the building is not permitted.
