= Languages of São Tomé and Príncipe =

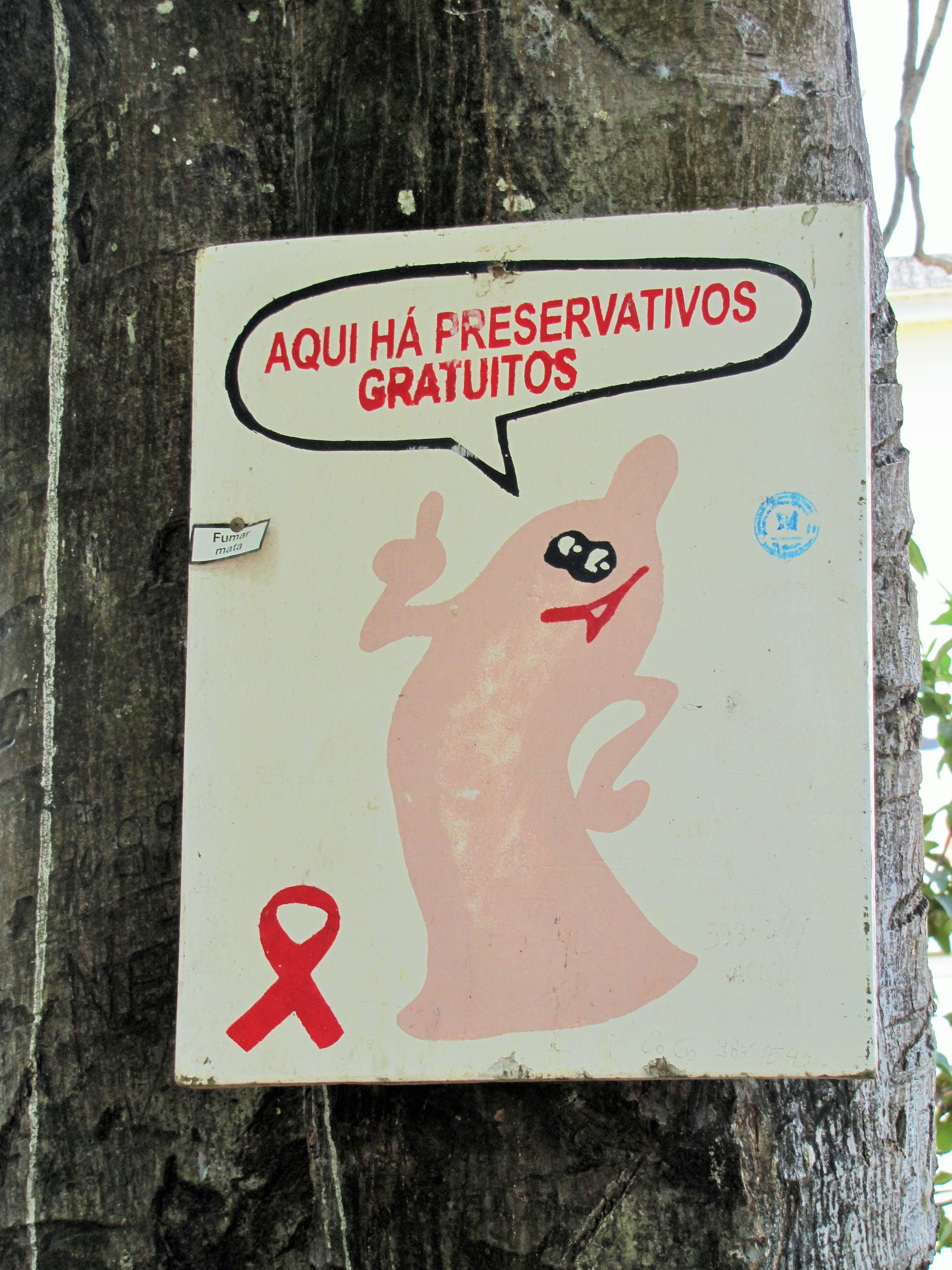
- Sign in Portuguese in São Tomé. The text reads "free condoms here".
- Official: Portuguese
- Vernacular: São Tomean Portuguese, Forro Creole, Principense Creole, Angolar Creole
- Immigrant: Cape Verdean Creole
- Foreign: English, French
- Signed: São Tomé and Príncipe Sign Language
- Keyboard layout: Portuguese QWERTY

Languages of São Tomé and Príncipe (2012)
Languages	percent
Portuguese	98.4%
Forro	36.2%
Cabo Verdean	8.5%
French	6.8%
Angolar	6.6%
English	4.9%
Other	2.4%
Principense	1%

The official and national language of São Tomé and Príncipe is Portuguese. It is spoken by virtually all of the population. Locally developed restructured varieties of Portuguese or Portuguese creoles are also spoken: Forro, Angolar and Principense. Cape Verdean Creole is spoken by 8.5% and it is also a Portuguese creole. French (6.8%) and English (4.9%) are foreign languages taught in schools.

== See also ==
- Portuguese-speaking African countries
