= Demographics of São Tomé and Príncipe =

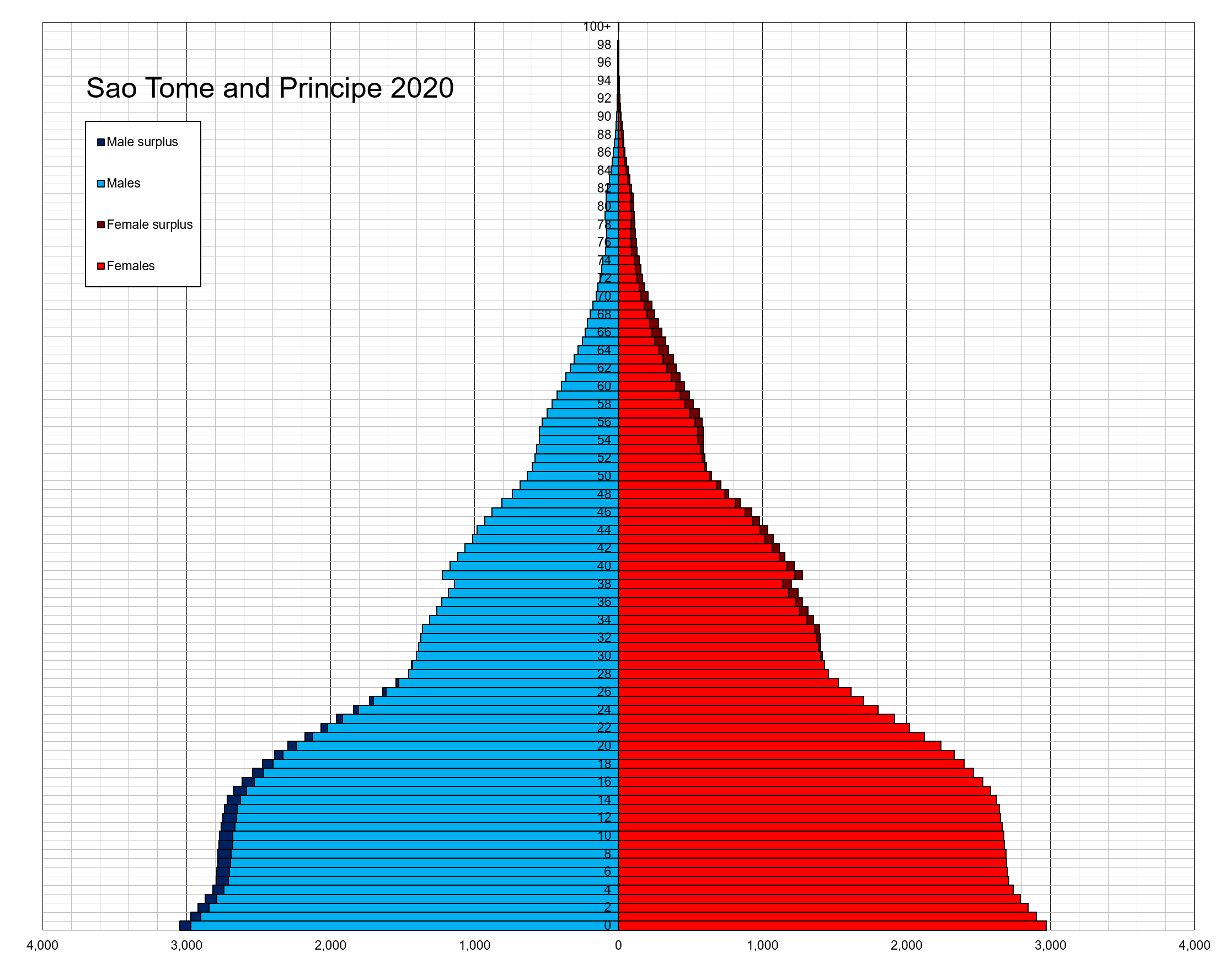
- Population pyramid of Sao Tome and Principe in 2020
- Population: 217,164 (2022 est.)
- Growth rate: 1.48% (2022 est.)
- Birth rate: 28.19 births/1,000 population (2022 est.)
- Death rate: 6.2 deaths/1,000 population (2022 est.)
- Net migration rate: -7.19 migrant(s)/1,000 population (2022 est.)
- Immigrant share: 0.8% (2024)

Age structure
- 0–14 years: 39.77%
- 65 and over: 2.87%

Nationality
- Nationality: Sao Tomean

Language
- Official: Portuguese
- Spoken: Forro Creole

Population, fertility rate and net reproduction rate, United Nations estimates

Demographic features of the population of São Tomé and Príncipe include population density, ethnicity, education level, health of the populace, economic status, religious affiliations and other aspects.

Of São Tomé and Príncipe's total population of some 201,800, about 193,380 live on São Tomé and 8,420 on Príncipe. All are descended from various ethnic groups that have migrated to the islands since 1485. 70% of the people on São Tomé and Príncipe are black and 30% of the people are mixed race, mostly black and white. Six groups are identifiable:

- Luso-Africans, or mixed-heritage, descendants of Portuguese colonists and enslaved Africans brought to the islands during the early years of settlement from Benin, Gabon, the Republic of the Congo, the Democratic Republic of the Congo, and Angola (these people also are known as filhos da terra or "children of the land");
- Angolares, reputedly descendants of Angolan slaves who survived a 1540 shipwreck and now earn their livelihood fishing;
- Forros, descendants of freed slaves when slavery was abolished;
- Serviçais, contract laborers from Angola, Mozambique, and Cape Verde, living temporarily on the islands;
- Tongas, children of serviçais born on the islands; and
- Europeans, primarily Portuguese.
- Asians, mostly Chinese minority, including Macanese people of mixed Portuguese and Chinese blood from Macau.

Although a small country, São Tomé and Príncipe has four national languages: Portuguese (the official language, spoken by 95% of the population), and the Portuguese-based creoles Forro (85%), Angolar (3%) and Principense (0.1%). French is also learned in schools, as the country is a member of Francophonie.

In the 1970s, there were two significant population movements—the exodus of most of the 4,000 Portuguese residents and the influx of several hundred São Toméan refugees from Angola. The islanders have been absorbed largely into a common Luso-African culture. Almost all belong to the Roman Catholic, Evangelical Protestant, or Seventh-day Adventist churches, which in turn retain close ties with churches in Portugal. There is a small but growing Muslim population.

== Population ==
São Tomé and Príncipe's population between 1960 and 2017.

According to the 2022 revision of the world factbook the total population was 217,164 in 2022, compared to only 60,000 in 1950. The proportion of children below the age of 15 in 2020 was 39.8%, 57.4% was between 15 and 65 years of age, while 2.9% was 65 years or older.

	Total population	Population aged 0–14 (%)	Population aged 15–64 (%)	Population aged 65+ (%)
1950	60,000	32.9	63.1	4.0
1955	59,000	32.9	63.1	4.0
1960	64,000	32.9	63.2	4.0
1965	65,000	41.1	56.3	2.6
1970	74,000	46.7	48.4	4.9
1975	82,000	47.0	49.1	3.9
1980	95,000	46.6	48.6	4.8
1985	104,000	46.6	48.8	4.7
1990	116,000	46.6	49.0	4.4
1995	128,000	44.8	50.8	4.4
2000	141,000	42.6	53.1	4.3
2005	153,000	41.6	54.0	4.4
2010	165,000	40.3	55.8	3.9
2020	211,122	39.8	57.4	2.9

Population Estimates by Sex and Age Group (01.VII.2017):

Age group	Male	Female	Total	%
Total	97 988	99 712	197 700	100
0–4	12 031	12 102	24 133	12.21
5–9	13 833	13 667	27 500	13.91
10–14	12 677	12 714	25 390	12.84
15–19	10 673	10 672	21 345	10.80
20–24	9 278	9 062	18 341	9.28
25–29	7 895	7 946	15 841	8.01
30–34	7 276	7 389	14 665	7.42
35–39	6 105	6 252	12 358	6.25
40–44	4 762	4 784	9 546	4.83
45–49	3 831	3 822	7 654	3.87
50–54	2 880	3 153	6 033	3.05
55–59	2 384	2 620	5 004	2.53
60–64	1 573	1 858	3 431	1.74
65–69	1 076	1 173	2 249	1.14
70–74	665	835	1 500	0.76
75–79	535	777	1 313	0.66
80+	514	886	1 400	0.71
Age group	Male	Female	Total	Percent
0–14	38 541	38 483	77 024	38.96
15–64	56 657	57 558	114 215	57.77
65+	2 790	3 671	6 461	3.27

== Vital statistics ==
Registration of vital events is in São Tomé & Príncipe not available for recent years. The Population Departement of the United Nations prepared the following estimates.

Period	Live births per year	Deaths per year	Natural change per year	CBR*	CDR*	NC*	TFR*	IMR*
1950–1955	3 000	1 000	2 000	47.7	21.0	26.7	6.20	124
1955–1960	3 000	1 000	2 000	47.7	18.5	29.2	6.20	112
1960–1965	3 000	1 000	2 000	47.0	16.8	30.1	6.30	99
1965–1970	3 000	1 000	2 000	42.7	13.1	29.6	6.40	88
1970–1975	3 000	1 000	2 000	40.7	13.2	27.6	6.52	80
1975–1980	4 000	1 000	3 000	41.1	11.0	30.1	6.50	70
1980–1985	4 000	1 000	3 000	40.4	11.5	28.9	6.24	66
1985–1990	4 000	1 000	3 000	38.8	10.7	28.1	5.66	63
1990–1995	5 000	1 000	3 000	37.0	9.8	27.1	5.16	61
1995–2000	5 000	1 000	4 000	35.9	9.2	26.7	4.80	58
2000–2005	5 000	1 000	4 000	34.8	8.8	26.0	4.34	55
2005–2010	5 000	1 000	4 000	32.4	8.2	24.2	3.85	52
* CBR = crude birth rate (per 1000); CDR = crude death rate (per 1000); NC = natural change (per 1000); IMR = infant mortality rate per 1000 births; TFR = total fertility rate (number of children per woman)

=== Registered births and deaths ===
Year	Population	Live births	Deaths	Natural increase	Crude birth rate	Crude death rate	Rate of natural increase	TFR
2012		5 173	1 287	3 886	27.6	6.9	20.7	
2015		5 022	1 226	3 796				
2017		5 190	1 202	3 988	26.3	6.1	20.2	
2024		3 339	638	2 701	15.7	3.0	14.7	

=== Demographic and Health Surveys ===
Fertility Rate (TFR) (Wanted Fertility Rate) and CBR (Crude Birth Rate):
Year	Total		Urban		Rural	
Year	CBR	TFR	CBR	TFR	CBR	TFR
2008–2009	34.5	4.9 (3.3)	32.4	4.4 (3.0)	36.7	5.5 (3.7)

Fertility data as of 2008–2009 (DHS Program):

Region	Total fertility rate	Percentage of women age 15–49 currently pregnant	Mean number of children ever born to women age 40–49
Centro	4.6	8.2	5.5
Sul	5.4	8.3	6.2
Norte	5.7	8.8	6.7
Príncipe	5.0	11.6	6.1

=== Life expectancy ===
Period	Life expectancy in Years
1950–1955	46.40
1955–1960	▲48.89
1960–1965	▲51.86
1965–1970	▲54.42
1970–1975	▲57.36
1975–1980	▲60.21
1980–1985	▲60.59
1985–1990	▲61.40
1990–1995	▲62.22
1995–2000	▲63.01
2000–2005	▲63.80
2005–2010	▲65.47
2010–2015	▲66.14

== Ethnic groups ==
Mestiços, angolares (descendants of Angolan slaves), forros (descendants of freed slaves), serviçais (contract laborers from Angola, Mozambique, and Cape Verde), tongas (children of serviçais born on the islands) and Europeans (primarily Portuguese).

== Languages ==
Portuguese 98.4% (official)
Forro 36.2%
Cabo Verdian 8.5%
French 6.8%
Angolar 6.6%
English 4.9%
Lunguie 1%
Other (including sign language) 2.4%

== Religion ==
Catholic 55.7%, Adventist 4.1%, Assembly of God 3.4%, New Apostolic 2.9%, Mana 2.3%, Universal Kingdom of God 2%, Jehovah's Witness 1.2%, other 6.2%, none 21.2%, unspecified 1% (2012 est.)
