= Outline of São Tomé and Príncipe =

Overview of and topical guide to São Tomé and Príncipe

The Flag of São Tomé and Príncipe

The Coat of arms of São Tomé and Príncipe

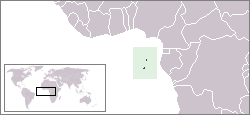
The location of São Tomé and Príncipe

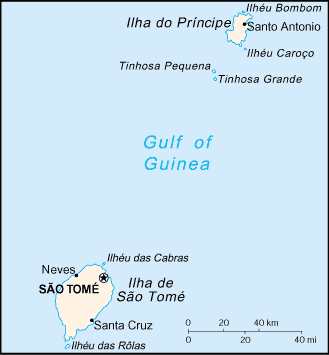
An enlargeable map of the Democratic Republic of São Tomé and Príncipe

The following outline is provided as an overview of and topical guide to São Tomé and Príncipe:

São Tomé and Príncipe – island nation located in the Gulf of Guinea, off the western equatorial coast of Africa. The republic comprises two main islands: São Tomé Island and Príncipe Island, located about 140 kilometres (87 mi) apart and about 250 kilometres (160 mi) and 225 kilometres (140 mi), respectively, off the northwestern coast of Gabon. Both islands are part of an extinct volcanic mountain range. São Tomé, the sizable southern island, is situated just north of the equator. It was named in honor of Saint Thomas by Portuguese explorers who happened to arrive at the island on his feast day. São Tomé and Príncipe is the second-smallest African country in terms of population (the Seychelles being the smallest). It is the smallest country in the world that is not a former British overseas territory, a former United States trusteeship, or one of the European microstates. It is also the smallest Portuguese-speaking country.

== General reference ==
- Pronunciation: /ˌsaʊ təˈmeɪ ... ˈprɪnsɪpə, -peɪ/
- Common English country name: São Tomé and Príncipe
- Official English country name: (The) Democratic Republic of São Tomé and Príncipe
- Common endonym(s):
- Official endonym(s):
- Adjectival(s): São Toméan
- Demonym(s): São Toméan(s)
- Etymology: Name of São Tomé and Príncipe
- ISO country codes: ST, STP, 678
- ISO region codes: See ISO 3166-2:ST
- Internet country code top-level domain: .st

== Geography of São Tomé and Príncipe ==
Geography of São Tomé and Príncipe

- São Tomé and Príncipe is: an island country consisting of two islands
- Location:
  - Eastern Hemisphere, on the Equator
  - Atlantic Ocean
    - Gulf of Guinea
  - Africa (though not on the mainland)
  - Time zone: Coordinated Universal Time UTC+00
  - Extreme points of São Tomé and Príncipe
    - High: Pico de São Tomé on São Tomé Island 2,024 m (6,640 ft)
    - Low: Gulf of Guinea 0 m
  - Land boundaries: none
  - Coastline: Gulf of Guinea 209 km
- Population of São Tomé and Príncipe: 158,000 - 181st most populous country
- Area of São Tomé and Príncipe: 964
- Atlas of São Tomé and Príncipe

=== Environment of São Tomé and Príncipe ===
Environment of São Tomé and Príncipe

- Wildlife of São Tomé and Príncipe
  - Fauna of São Tomé and Príncipe
    - Birds of São Tomé and Príncipe
    - Mammals of São Tomé and Príncipe

==== Natural geographic features of São Tomé and Príncipe ====
List of landforms of São Tomé and Príncipe

- Glaciers in São Tomé and Príncipe: none
- Islands of São Tomé and Príncipe
- Mountains of São Tomé and Príncipe
  - Volcanoes in São Tomé and Príncipe
- Rivers of São Tomé and Príncipe
- Valleys of São Tomé and Príncipe
- World Heritage Sites in São Tomé and Príncipe: None

=== Regions of São Tomé and Príncipe ===
Regions of São Tomé and Príncipe

==== Ecoregions of São Tomé and Príncipe ====
List of ecoregions in São Tomé and Príncipe

==== Administrative divisions of São Tomé and Príncipe ====
Administrative divisions of São Tomé and Príncipe

- Autonomous Region of Príncipe
- Districts of São Tomé and Príncipe

===== Districts of São Tomé and Príncipe =====
Districts of São Tomé and Príncipe

=== Demography of São Tomé and Príncipe ===
Demographics of São Tomé and Príncipe

== Government and politics of São Tomé and Príncipe ==
- Form of government: unitary semi-presidential representative democratic republic
- Capital of São Tomé and Príncipe: São Tomé
- Elections in São Tomé and Príncipe
- Political parties in São Tomé and Príncipe

=== Branches of the government of São Tomé and Príncipe ===
Government of São Tomé and Príncipe

==== Executive branch of the government of São Tomé and Príncipe ====
- Head of state: President of São Tomé and Príncipe, Carlos Vila Nova
- Head of government: Prime Minister of São Tomé and Príncipe, Américo Ramos

==== Legislative branch of the government of São Tomé and Príncipe ====
- Parliament of São Tomé and Príncipe (bicameral)
  - Upper house: Senate of São Tomé and Príncipe
  - Lower house: House of Commons of São Tomé and Príncipe

==== Judicial branch of the government of São Tomé and Príncipe ====
Court system of São Tomé and Príncipe

=== Foreign relations of São Tomé and Príncipe ===
Foreign relations of São Tomé and Príncipe

- Diplomatic missions in São Tomé and Príncipe
- Diplomatic missions of São Tomé and Príncipe

==== International organization membership ====
The Democratic Republic of São Tomé and Príncipe is a member of:

- African, Caribbean, and Pacific Group of States (ACP)
- African Development Bank Group (AfDB)
- African Union (AU)
- Community of Portuguese Language Countries (CPLP)
- Food and Agriculture Organization (FAO)
- Group of 77 (G77)
- International Bank for Reconstruction and Development (IBRD)
- International Civil Aviation Organization (ICAO)
- International Criminal Court (ICCt) (signatory)
- International Criminal Police Organization (Interpol)
- International Development Association (IDA)
- International Federation of Red Cross and Red Crescent Societies (IFRCS)
- International Finance Corporation (IFC)
- International Fund for Agricultural Development (IFAD)
- International Labour Organization (ILO)
- International Maritime Organization (IMO)
- International Monetary Fund (IMF)
- International Olympic Committee (IOC)
- International Organization for Migration (IOM) (observer)
- International Red Cross and Red Crescent Movement (ICRM)
- International Telecommunication Union (ITU)
- International Trade Union Confederation (ITUC)
- Inter-Parliamentary Union (IPU)
- Nonaligned Movement (NAM)
- Organisation internationale de la Francophonie (OIF)
- Organisation for the Prohibition of Chemical Weapons (OPCW)
- União Latina
- United Nations (UN)
- United Nations Conference on Trade and Development (UNCTAD)
- United Nations Educational, Scientific, and Cultural Organization (UNESCO)
- United Nations Industrial Development Organization (UNIDO)
- Universal Postal Union (UPU)
- World Confederation of Labour (WCL)
- World Food Programme (WFP)
- World Health Organization (WHO)
- World Intellectual Property Organization (WIPO)
- World Meteorological Organization (WMO)
- World Tourism Organization (UNWTO)
- World Trade Organization (WTO) (observer)

=== Law and order in São Tomé and Príncipe ===
Law of São Tomé and Príncipe

- Constitution of São Tomé and Príncipe
- Human rights in São Tomé and Príncipe
  - LGBT rights in São Tomé and Príncipe
- São Toméan National Police Force

=== Military of São Tomé and Príncipe ===
Military of São Tomé and Príncipe

- Command
  - Commander-in-chief:
- Forces

=== Local government in São Tomé and Príncipe ===
Local government in São Tomé and Príncipe

== History of São Tomé and Príncipe ==
History of São Tomé and Príncipe

- Timeline of the history of São Tomé and Príncipe
- Current events of São Tomé and Príncipe

== Culture of São Tomé and Príncipe ==
Culture of São Tomé and Príncipe

- Cuisine of São Tomé and Príncipe
- Languages of São Tomé and Príncipe
- National symbols of São Tomé and Príncipe
  - Coat of arms of São Tomé and Príncipe
  - Flag of São Tomé and Príncipe
- Public holidays in São Tomé and Príncipe
- Religion in São Tomé and Príncipe
  - Islam in São Tomé and Príncipe
  - Sikhism in São Tomé and Príncipe
- World Heritage Sites in São Tomé and Príncipe: None

=== Art in São Tomé and Príncipe ===
- Music of São Tomé and Príncipe

=== Sports in São Tomé and Príncipe ===
Sports in São Tomé and Príncipe

- Football in São Tomé and Príncipe
- São Tomé and Príncipe at the Olympics

The country's basketball activities are administered by the Federação Santomense de Basquetebol.

== Economy and infrastructure of São Tomé and Príncipe ==
Economy of São Tomé and Príncipe

- Economic rank, by nominal GDP (2007): 188th (one hundred and eighty eighth)
- Banking in São Tomé and Príncipe
  - National Bank of São Tomé and Príncipe
- Communications in São Tomé and Príncipe
- Companies of São Tomé and Príncipe
- Currency of São Tomé and Príncipe: Dobra
  - ISO 4217: STD
- Transport in São Tomé and Príncipe
  - Airports in São Tomé and Príncipe

== Education in São Tomé and Príncipe ==
Education in São Tomé and Príncipe

== See also ==
São Tomé and Príncipe

- List of São Tomé and Príncipe-related topics
- List of international rankings
- Member state of the United Nations
- Outline of Africa
- Outline of geography
