= Annobonese Creole =

Portuguese-based creole of insular Equatorial Guinea

Annobonese
- Fa d'Ambu
- Native to: Equatorial Guinea
- Region: mainly on Annobón island; Bioko island; some speakers in Equatorial Guinea's mainland
- Native speakers: 6,600 (2017)
- Language family: Portuguese creoles: Lower Guinea Portuguese; Annobonese

Official status
- Recognised minority language in: Equatorial Guinea

Language codes
- ISO 639-3: fab
- Glottolog: fada1250
- Linguasphere: 51-AAC-ae

Annobonese Creole is a Portuguese creole known to its speakers as Fa d'Ambu or Fá d'Ambô (Portuguese: Fala de Ano-Bom, "Annobón speech"). It is spoken on the Annobón and Bioko Islands off the coast of Equatorial Guinea, mostly by people of mixed African, Portuguese and Spanish descent. It is called annobonense or annobonés in Spanish.

The attitude in Equatorial Guinea towards this language is positive. It is taught in special courses in the former capital city of Malabo.

== History ==
Annobonese originated sometime during the 16th century as an offshoot of Forro Creole, while this stage of Annobonese is unattested remaining linguistic traces show this. The creole language was spoken originally by the descendants of intermixing between Portuguese men and African women slaves imported from other places, especially from São Tomé and Angola, and therefore descends from Portuguese and Forro, the creole of the freed slaves of São Tomé. The government of Equatorial Guinea financed an Instituto Internacional da Língua Portuguesa (IILP) sociolinguistic study in Annobón, which noticed strong links with the Portuguese creole populations in São Tomé and Príncipe, Cape Verde and Guinea-Bissau.

The language was first attested in an article called Negerportugiesische von Annobom. Sitzungsberichte der philosophisch-historischen Classe der Kaiserlichen Akademie der Wissenschaften in Wien (Negro Portuguese by Annobom. Meeting reports of the philosophical-historical class of the Imperial Academy of Sciences in Vienna). Which was written by Hugo Schuchart in 1888.

The Annobonese population was relatively isolated from the outside world, as their island was too small to a major trade center and wasn't near any major trade routes. After Annobón island was taken over by the Portuguese the language absorbed very little influence from Spanish. Though Spanish influence would gradually influence it as Annobón became further integrated.

Today Annobonese is a thriving language as it is the first language of nearly all of the Annobonese people. The language is used in all aspects of society but the language is never written. Practically all Annobonese are bilingual in other languages including Pidgin English, Spanish, Bubi and Fang.

== Phonology ==
Consonants
		Labial	Alveolar	Palatal	Velar
Plosive	Voiceless	p	t		k
Plosive	Voiced	b	d		g
Prenasalized Plosive	Voiceless		nt		
Prenasalized Plosive	Voiced	mb	nd		ng
Fricative	Voiceless	f	s	š	x
Fricative	Voiced	v	z		
Affricative	Voiceless			tɕ	
Affricative	Voiced			dʑ	
Nasal	Voiceless				
Nasal	Voiced	m	n	ɲ	
Liquid	Voiced		l		
Approximant	Voiced	w		j	

Vowels
	Front	Central	Back
Close	i i:		u (u:)?
Mid	e e:		o o:
Open		a a:	

Diphthongs: Ej, Aj, Uj

The syllable structure of Annobonese syllable structure is almost exclusively CV-CV-C(V) with that final vowel being omitted. Words that start with a vowel are rare but do exist, examples being oyo meaning eye or abada meaning fruit.

Vowels are usually pronounced as short vowels but can be pronounced a long vowels though this rarely changes the meaning of a lexeme. The majority of words in Annobonese are not dependent on tone but there are a few words that use tone to differentiate between different words. There are two tones use for this purpose and high tone and a low tone, long vowels are always pronounced with a hight tone.

== Grammar ==
Some features of the Creole:

=== Pronouns ===
	Subject	Object	Independent	Adnominal Possessive
1sg	amu/am'/m'	mu/m’	amu	mu
2sg	bo	bo	bo	bo
3sg	eli/e/i	li/l	eli	d'eli
1pl	no/nõ	no/nõ	no	no
2pl	namisedyi/namse	namisedyi/namse	namisedyi	namisedyi
3pl	ineni/ineñ/ine	ineni/ineñ/ine	ineni/ineñ	ineni/ineñ
indf	a/bo/nge/xa/kuzu			

=== Simple sentences ===
Fa d’Ambô follows a subject-verb-object (SVO) word order. Sentences that are ditransitive (they include a direct object pronoun as well as an indirect object pronoun) must place the indirect object before the direct object. An indirect object is not marked by a preposition in Fa d’Ambô. The table below displays one sentence translated across Fa d’Ambô, Portuguese, and English to further highlight this specific matter:

Fa d’Ambô	Portuguese	English
Pay da mina dyielu.	O pai dá dinheiro à menina.	The father gives money to the girl.

The word-for-word English translation of Pay da mina dyielu would be "Father give girl money." In Portuguese, the preposition a 'to' precedes the indirect object a menina 'the girl' (a + a contract into à), forming the overall meaning "... to the child." Fa d’Ambô lacks the use of this type of prepositional marker before indirect objects.

=== Noun classification ===
Nouns of Annobonese Creole are generally invariable, without employing grammatical gender or class. However, to express the specific gender of an animate noun to differentiate something that is male versus female, napay (male, man) or miela (female) may be added to the root word. For example: napay may be joined with mina (child) to form napay mina (boy, son). Actually the correct form would be "mina napay" (child male) and "mina namay" (child female). The same may be done with miela + mina = miela mina (girl, daughter). Again ("mina miela") - (young woman, an adolecense). In contrast, for a young male, na-nome (nanome) is used. In a sense, namay is female and miela is a woman. Nampay or nome is male.

=== Plurality ===
The plurality of a noun in Annobonese Creole usually goes unmarked (Ø) due to the fact that it can be implied from the context in which the noun fits within a sentence or clause. If the plurality cannot be directly implied and a type of plurality marker is necessary, there are a few ways in which to do so:

1. Employ a plural demonstrative (i.e. these, those). Example: galafa (bottle) + -nensyi (those) = galafa nensyi (those bottles)
2. Employ a numeral adjective. Example: canoe (canoe) + tisyi (three) = canoe tisyi (three canoes)
3. Employ a quantitative adjective. Example: xadyi (house) + muntu (much) = xadyi muntu (many houses)
4. Reduplicate the noun (full reduplication). Note that this specific plurality marker indicates the inclusion of all members of a noun. Example: ngolo (shell) + ngolo = ngolo ngolo (all the shells)

=== Articles ===
Articles are only used in the language when speakers feel they are necessary. When they are included, they are positioned directly before the noun. The definite article utilizes one form for both the singular and plural forms of nouns, na. The indefinite article can appear as either wan or an for nouns in the singular form and zuguan for the plural counterparts. Example: The Annobonese sentence Na may banku translates to English as "The white woman", where na is the definite article "the", may signifies "woman", and banku serves as the color adjective "white." The indefinite article is used in the example in the section above regarding word order, where wan serves to mark an undefined xat (letter): No skéve wan xat (We write a letter).

Combinations of articles with plurality markers (refer to plurality section above) are also common in the language. These combinations can aid to clarify the plurality of definite articles, seeing as they have no plural form on their own. Example: Na mina nensyi (These/those children). Nensyi serves as the plural demonstrative "these" or "those." Na mina, without the implementation of the plural demonstrative, could be interpreted as singular "the child" rather than plural "the children", assuming context is unknown.

== Lexicon ==
Annobonese is analogous to Forro. In fact, it may be derived from Forro as it shares the same structure and 82% of its lexicon. After Annobón passed to Spain, the language incorporated some words of Spanish origin (10% of its lexicon),, but it is often difficult to say from which language a word derives, given the similarity between Spanish and Portuguese, a situation similar to that of the Papiamento creole.

== Bibliography ==
- Araujo, Gabriel Antunes; Agostinho, Ana Lívia; Silveira, Alfredo Christofoletti; Freitas, Shirley; Bandeira, Manuele (2013). "Fa d'ambô: Língua crioula de Ano Bom". Cadernos de Estudos Lingüísticos (in Portuguese). 55 (2): 25–44. doi:10.20396/cel.v55i2.8637289.
- Zamora Segorbe, Armando (2010). Gramática descriptiva del fá d'ambô (in Spanish). Barcelona: Centro de Estudios Internacionales de Biología y Antropologia.
- Hagemeijer, Tjerk; Maurer-Cecchini, Philippe; Zamora Segorbe, Armando (2020). A Grammar of Fa d'Ambô. Berlin: De Gruyter. doi:10.1515/9783110766264. ISBN 978-3-11-043802-4. S2CID 247587103.
