= São Toméan Portuguese =

Variety of Portuguese language

- português santomense
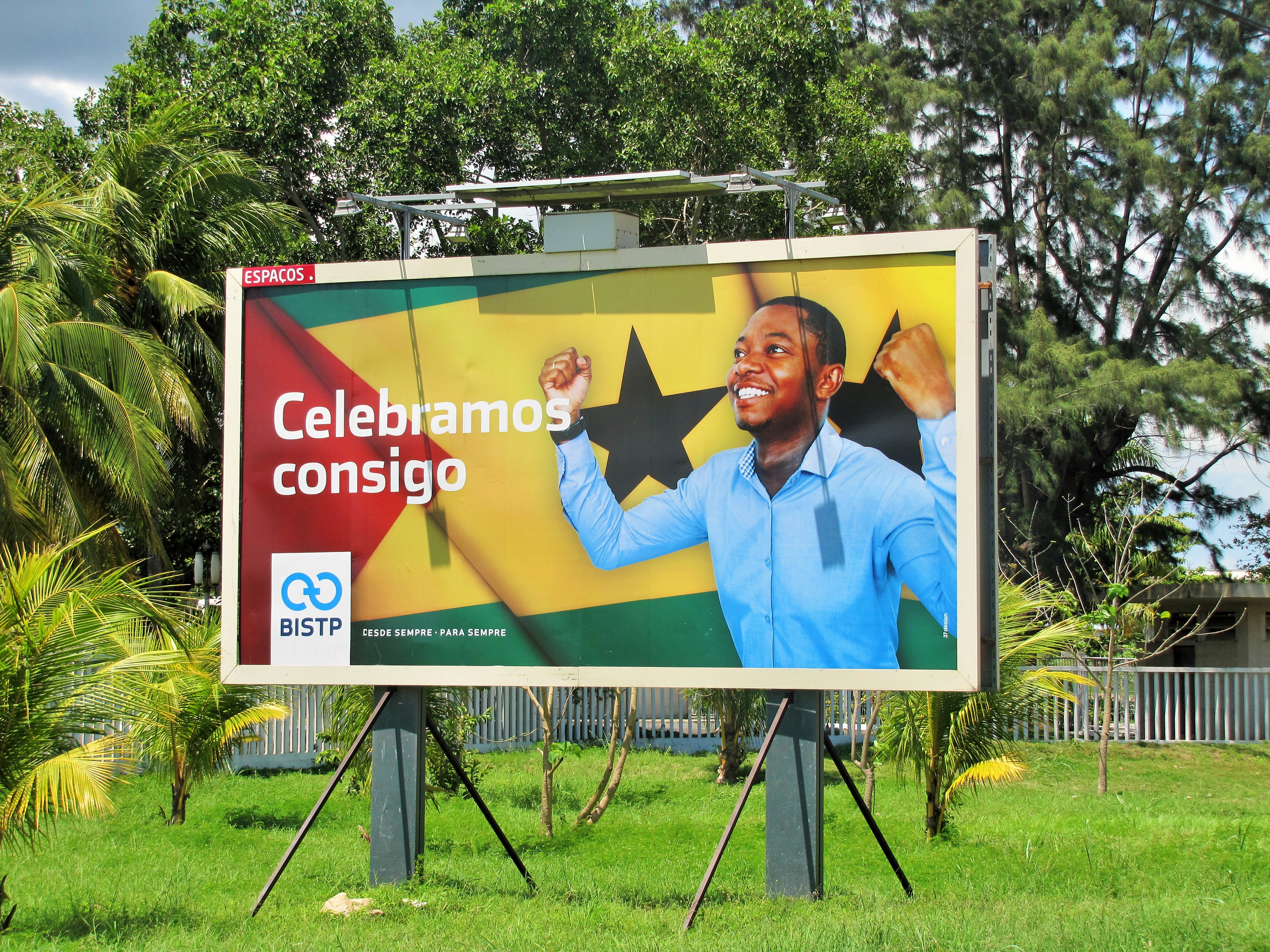
- Outdoor advertising from Banco Internacional de São Tomé e Príncipe
- Native speakers: Native speakers: 70,000 (2016); L2 users: 100,000
- Language family: Indo-European: Italic; Latin; Romance; Western Romance; Ibero-Romance; West-Iberian; Galician-Portuguese; Portuguese; São Toméan Portuguese

Official status
- Official language in: São Tomé and Príncipe
- Regulated by: Academia São-Tomense de Letras

Language codes
- ISO 639-3: –
- Glottolog: None
- IETF: pt-ST

São Toméan Portuguese (Portuguese: português santomense or português são-tomense) is a dialect of Portuguese spoken in São Tomé and Príncipe.

It contains many archaic features in pronunciation, vocabulary, grammar, and syntax, similar to Angolan Portuguese. It was once the dialect of the owners of the roças and the middle class, but now it is the dialect of the lower and middle classes, as the upper class often uses modern European Portuguese standard pronunciation, which is now also used by lower and middle classes.

São Tomé is the third country in order of percentage of Portuguese speakers (after Portugal and Brazil), with more than 95% of the population speaking Portuguese, and more than 50% using it as their first language. The rest of the population speaks Portuguese creoles.

The Portuguese language is undeniably the most spoken and promoted language in the archipelago, being spoken by 98.4% of the population, including by official means. However, the variety chosen as target and loaded with social prestige is still European Portuguese, which generates a series of problems, considering that it is a different variety from that current in the everyday life of speakers. So much in São Tomé and Príncipe, varieties of the Portuguese language emerge from the use and also contact with local languages. European Portuguese is mostly spoken in formal situations, in the media, business, education, judicial system and legislature, while Sao Tomean Portuguese and Portuguese Creoles Forro Creole, Principense Creole, and Angolar Creole are preferred for informal situations as a vernacular language in day-to-day life and daily activities, and code switching even occurs between the Creoles, standard European Portuguese, and São Tomean Portuguese in informal speech.

== Phonology ==
The vowel frame in Portuguese is formed by 7 vowels in the tonic context [i, u, e, o, ɛ, ɔ, a], which distances it from EP and brings it closer to BP. As for the pretonic, in the Portuguese spoken in São Tomé and Príncipe, 5 vowels occupy this position, being the same as in BP [i, u, o, e, a]. However, high middle vowels can be raised and perceived as [i, u]. With regard to vowel raising in this variety, this process is linked to the age group of the speakers, with younger people being the ones who perform it the most, which suggests an ongoing change.

Pretonic in São Tomé and Príncipe Portuguese tends towards a set of only 3 vowels [i, u, a]. In non-final posttonic, there is also an increase in high mid vowels, according to the author. Thus, Sao Tome Portuguese has 3 vowels in this position [i, u, a].

In the context of final posttonics, as in European Portuguese and Brazilian Portuguese, there are only 3 vowels, all executed in a reduced form [ɪ, ʊ, ɐ]. Regarding portuguese from São Tomé diphthongs, based on the analysis of a corpus with 3,017 words that have diphthongs in their underlying form, it was found that there was monophthongization in 49% of the data. The use of rhotics in Sao Tome Portuguese is an innovative feature, which distinguishes this variety from other varieties of Portuguese, such as Brazilian and Lusitanian. Some speakers produce the trilled alveolar consonant [r] in positions within the word that does not exist in the Portuguese spoken in Brazil and Portugal.

Added to this is the emergence of the voiced uvular fricative [ʁ] as a variant that clearly distinguishes two generations of Portuguese speakers, those under 39 and those over 40, or those born before or after the independence of the country. The fact that those born after independence use this variant more is linked to the construction of a Santomean identity, a way of distinguishing Portuguese from European, used by former colonizers. Although there is a pejorative idea among São Toméans around the use of the voiced uvular fricative [ʁ], which involves many questions of national identity.

== See also ==
- Portuguese in Equatorial Guinea
- Mozambican Portuguese
- Papiamento
