= São Tomé and Príncipe =

Island country in Central Africa

Democratic Republic of Sao Tome and Principe República Democrática de São Tomé e Príncipe
- Flag Coat of arms
- Motto: "Unidade, Disciplina, Trabalho" ("Unity, Discipline, Labour")
- Anthem: "Independência Total" ("Total Independence")
- Location of São Tomé and Príncipe (dark blue) in Africa (light blue)
- Capital and largest city: São Tomé; 0°20′N 6°44′E
- Recognised regional languages: Forro Creole; Angolar Creole; Principense Creole
- Official language and national language: Portuguese
- Religion (2020): 81.1% Christianity; 13.2% no religion; 3.1% folk religions; 2.4% others
- Demonyms: São Toméan; Santomean
- Government: Unitary semi-presidential republic
  - President: Carlos Vila Nova
  - Prime Minister: Américo Ramos
- Legislature: National Assembly

Independence from Portugal
  - Granted: 12 July 1975
  - Admitted to the United Nations: 16 September 1975
  - Constitutional reform: 22 August 1990

Area
  - Total: 964 km^{2} (372 sq mi) (171st)
  - Water (%): negligible

Population
  - 2023 estimate: 220,372 (175th)
  - Density: 199.7/km^{2} (517.2/sq mi) (69th)
- GDP (PPP): 2024 estimate
  - Total: ▲$1 billion
  - Per capita: ▲$4,238
- GDP (nominal): 2024 estimate
  - Total: ▲$751 million
  - Per capita: ▲$3,167
- Gini (2017): ▲40.7 medium inequality
- HDI (2023): ▲0.637 medium (141st)
- Currency: Dobra (STN)
- Time zone: UTC+0 (GMT)
- Calling code: +239
- ISO 3166 code: ST
- Internet TLD: .st

São Tomé and Príncipe, (Note: /ˌsaʊ təˈmeɪ ... ˈprɪnsɪpeɪ/ SOW tə-MAY ... PRIN-si-pay; Portuguese: São Tomé e Príncipe, pronounced [sɐ̃w tuˈmɛ i ˈpɾĩsɨpɨ]; English: "Saint Thomas and Prince".) officially the Democratic Republic of Sao Tome and Principe, (Note: Portuguese: República Democrática de São Tomé e Príncipe.) is an island country in the Gulf of Guinea, off the western equatorial coast of Central Africa. It consists of two archipelagos around the two main islands of São Tomé and Príncipe, about 81 nautical miles (150 km; 93 mi) apart and about 135 and 121 nautical miles (250 and 224 km; 155 and 139 mi) off the northwestern coast of Gabon. With a population of 201,800 (2018 official estimate), São Tomé and Príncipe is the second-smallest and second-least populous African sovereign state after Seychelles.

The islands were uninhabited until Portuguese explorers João de Santarém and Pedro Escobar discovered them on 21 December 1470. Gradually colonized and settled throughout the 16th century, they collectively served as a vital commercial and trade centre for the Atlantic slave trade. The rich volcanic soil and proximity to the equator made São Tomé and Príncipe ideal for sugar cultivation, followed later by other cash crops such as coffee and cocoa. The lucrative plantation economy was heavily dependent upon enslaved Africans. Cycles of social unrest and economic instability throughout the 19th and 20th centuries culminated in peaceful independence in 1975 as a one-party communist state, which would remain in place until 1990. São Tomé and Príncipe has since remained one of Africa's most stable and democratic countries with a developing economy and a medium Human Development Index.

The people of São Tomé and Príncipe are predominantly of African and mestiço (mixed European and African) descent, with most practicing Christianity. The legacy of Portuguese rule is also visible in the country's culture, customs, and music, which fuse both European and African influences. São Tomé and Príncipe is a founding member state of the Community of Portuguese Language Countries.

== History ==
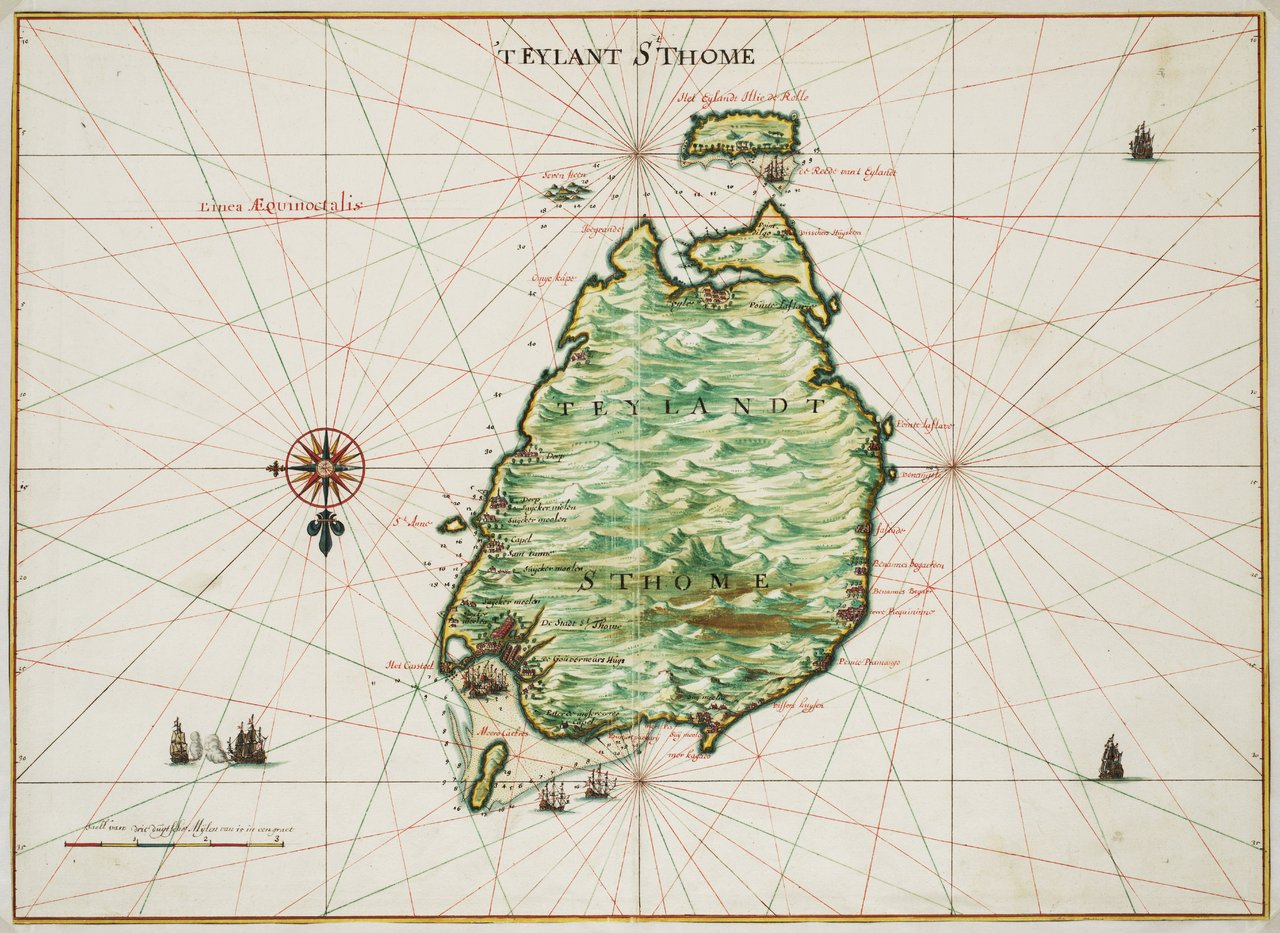
Map of São Tomé by Johannes Vingboons (1665)

The islands making up São Tomé and Príncipe were formed approximately 30 million years ago due to volcanic activity in deep water along the Cameroon Line. Over time, interactions with seawater and periods of eruption have engendered a wide variety of different igneous and volcanic rocks on the islands with complex assemblages of minerals.

=== Arrival of Europeans ===
The islands of São Tomé and Príncipe were uninhabited when the Portuguese arrived 21 December 1470. The first Europeans to put ashore were João de Santarém and Pêro Escobar. Portuguese navigators explored the islands and decided that they would be good locations for bases to trade with the mainland.

The dates of European arrival are sometimes given as 21 December (St Thomas's Day) 1471, for São Tomé; and 17 January (St Antony's Day) 1472, for Príncipe, though other sources cite different years around that time. Príncipe was initially named Santo Antão ("Saint Anthony"), changing its name in 1502 to Ilha do Príncipe ("Prince's Island"), in reference to the Prince of Portugal to whom duties on the island's sugar crop were paid.

The first successful settlement of São Tomé was established in 1493 by Álvaro Caminha, who received the land as a grant from the crown. Príncipe was settled in 1500 under a similar arrangement. Attracting settlers proved difficult, however, and most of the earliest inhabitants were "undesirables" sent from Portugal, mostly Sephardic Jews. 2,000 Jewish children, eight years old and under, were taken from the Iberian peninsula for work on the sugar plantations. In time, these settlers found the volcanic soil of the region suitable for agriculture, especially the growing of sugar.

=== Portuguese São Tomé and Príncipe ===
By 1515, São Tomé and Príncipe had become slave depots for the coastal slave trade centered at Elmina.

The cultivation of sugar was a labour-intensive process, and the Portuguese began to enslave large numbers of Africans from the continent. In the sugar boom's early stages, property on the islands had little value, with farming for local consumption. While the economy relied mainly on the transit of slaves, many foodstuffs were already imported. When the local landowner Álvaro Borges died in 1504, his cleared land and domesticated animals were sold for only 13,000 réis, about the price of three slaves. According to Valentim Fernandes around 1506, São Tomé had more sugarcane fields than Madeira "from which they already produce molasses," but the island lacked facilities for industrial sugar production.

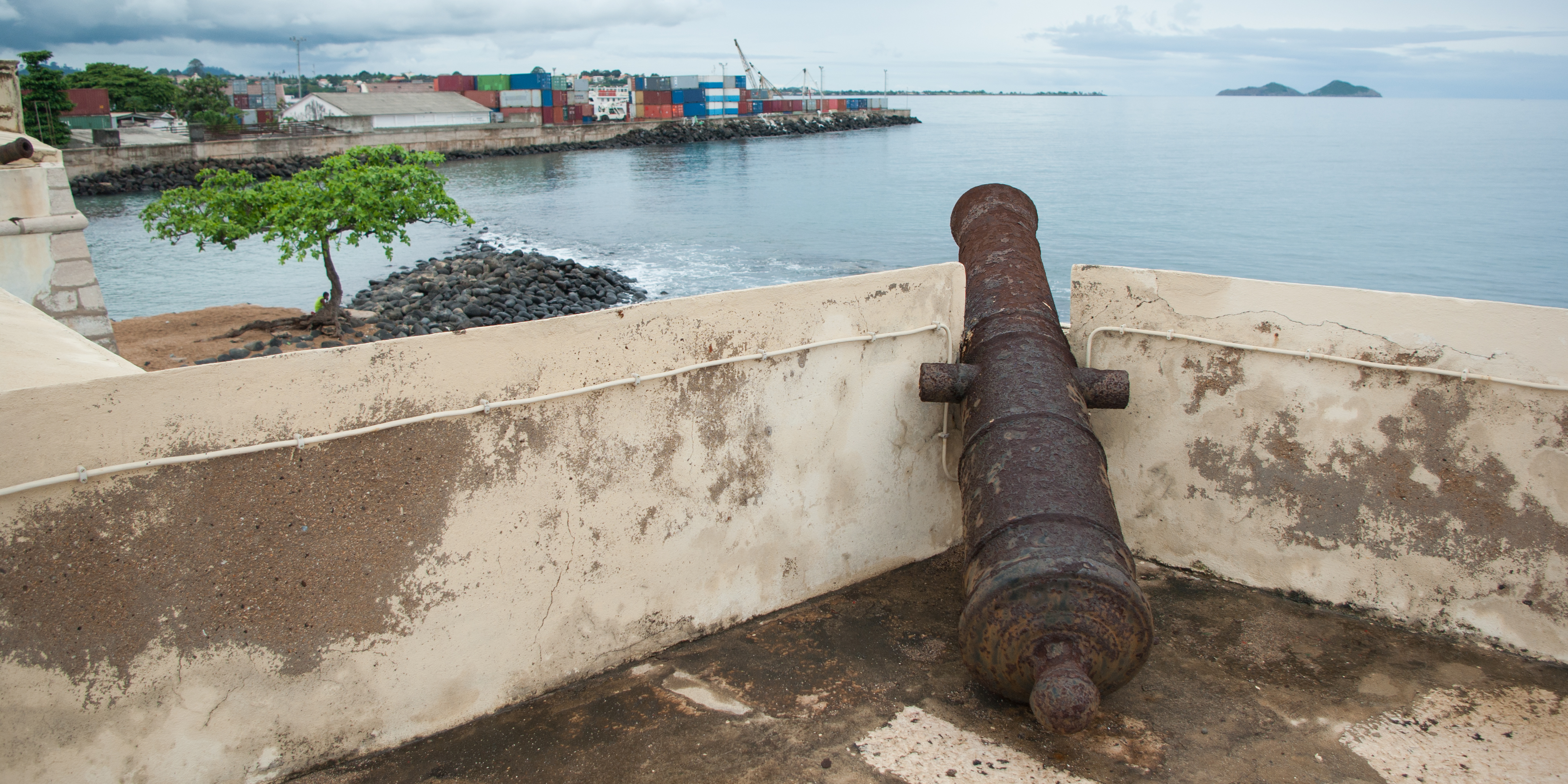
São Sebastião Museum in São Tomé

==== Economic development in the 16th century ====
São Tomé saw significant economic development following the introduction of a water-powered sugar mill in 1515, which led to the mass cultivation of sugar: "The fields are expanding and the sugar mills, too. At this time, only two sugar mills are here and another three are being built, counting the mill of the contractors, which is large. Similarly, the necessary conditions exist, such as streams and timber, to be able to build many more. And the [sugar] canes are the biggest I have ever seen in my life." Sugar plantations were organized with slave labor, and by the mid-16th century, the Portuguese settlers had turned the islands into Africa's foremost exporter of sugar.

Slaves in São Tomé were brought from the Slave Coast of West Africa, the Niger Delta, the island of Fernando Po, and later from the Kongo and Angola. In the 16th century, the enslaved were imported from and exported to Portugal, Elmina, the Kingdom of Kongo, Angola, and the Spanish Americas. In 1510, reportedly 10,000 to 12,000 slaves were imported by Portugal. In 1516, São Tomé received 4,072 slaves with the purpose of re-exportation. From 1519 to 1540, the island was the center of the slave trade between Elmina and the Niger Delta. Throughout the early to mid-sixteenth century, São Tomé traded in slaves intermittently with Angola and the Kingdom of Kongo. In 1525 São Tomé began trafficking slaves to the Spanish Americas, mainly to the Caribbean and Brazil. From 1532 to 1536, São Tomé sent an annual average of 342 slaves to the Antilles. Prior to 1580, the island accounted for 75 percent of Brazil's imports, mainly slaves. The slave trade remained a cornerstone of São Tomé's economy until after 1600.

The power dynamics of São Tomé in the 16th century were surprisingly diverse with the participation of free mulattos and black citizens in governance. Voluntary colonists shunned São Tomé for its disease and food shortages, so the Portuguese crown deported convicts to the island and encouraged interracial relationships to secure the colony. Slavery was also not permanent, as demonstrated through the 1515 royal decree granting the manumission of African wives of white settlers and their mixed-race children. In 1517, another decree freed the male slaves who had originally arrived on the island with the first colonists. After 1520, a royal charter allowed for property-owning, married, free mulattos to hold public offices. This was followed by a decree in 1546 establishing civil equality between these qualified mulattos and the white settlers, allowing free mulattos and black citizens opportunities for upward mobility and participation in local politics and business. Social divisions led to frequent disputes within the colony's town councils and with the governor and bishop, with constant political instability.

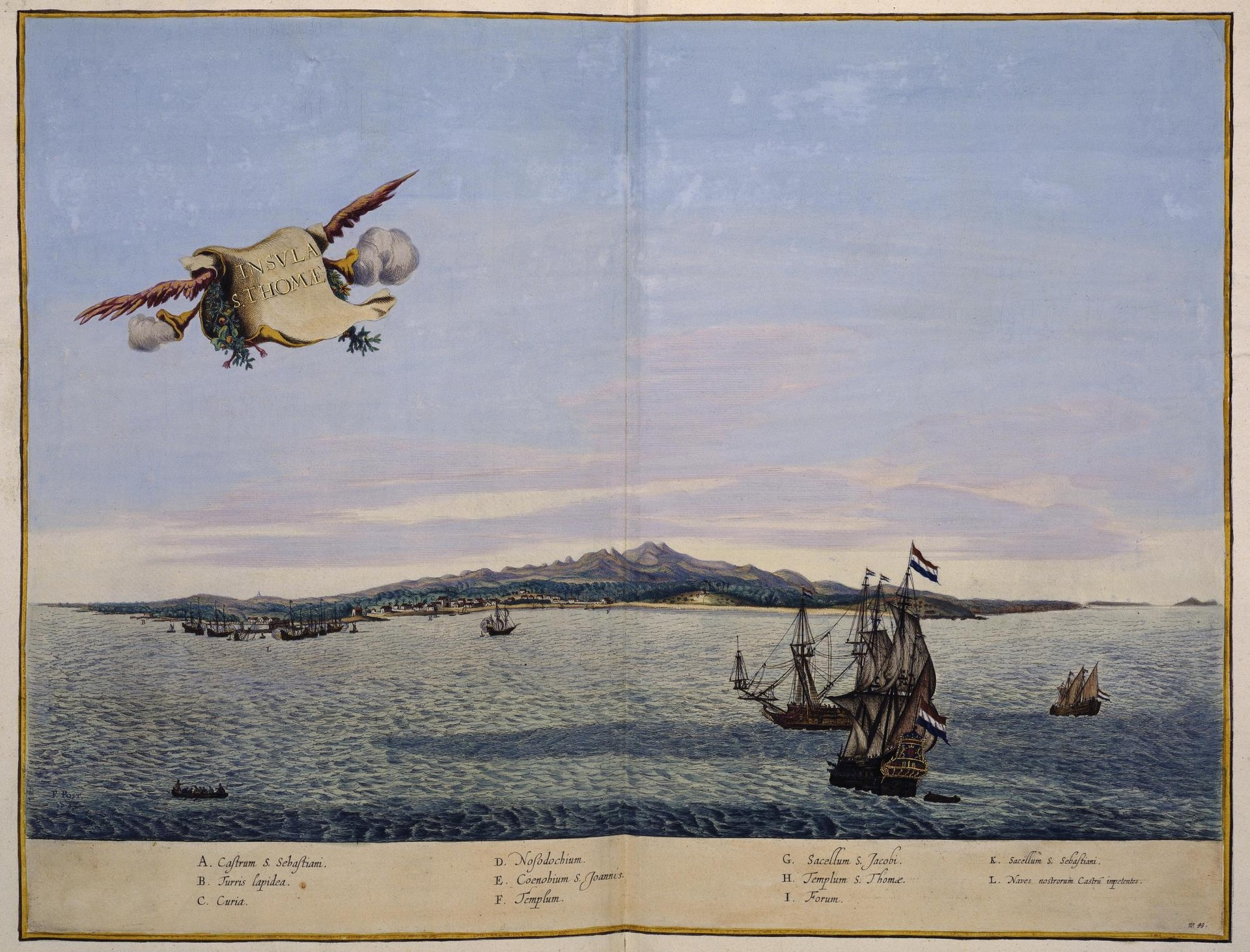
Capture of São Tomé by Cornelis Jol of the Dutch West India Company in 1641

At first, slavery in São Tomé was less strict. In the mid-16th century, an anonymous Portuguese pilot noted that the slaves were employed as couples, built their own accommodations, and worked autonomously once a week on the cultivation of their own food supply. However, this more relaxed slave system did not last long following the introduction of plantations. Throughout, slaves frequently ran away to the inhospitable mountain forests of the island's interior. Between 1514 and 1527, five percent of slaves that were imported to São Tomé escaped, often to starve, though 1531–1535 saw major food shortages even in the plantations. Eventually, the Maroon people developed settlements in the interior known as macambos.

==== Slave rebellions ====
The first signs of slave rebellion began in the 1530s, when the maroon gangs organized to attack plantations, some of which were abandoned. A formal complaint was lodged by local Portuguese authorities in 1531 lamenting that too many settlers and black citizens were being killed in the attacks, and that the island would be lost if the problem remained unresolved. In a 1533 'bush war', a 'bush captain' led militia units to suppress the maroons. A significant event in the maroon fight for freedom occurred in 1549, when two men claiming to be free-born were taken in from the macambos by a wealthy mulatto planter named Ana de Chaves. With the support of de Chaves, the two men petitioned the king to be declared free, and the request was approved. The largest population of maroons coincided with the sugar boom of the mid-16th century, as the plantations teemed with slaves. Between 1587 and 1590, many of the runaway slaves were defeated in another bush war. By 1593, the governor declared the maroon forces almost completely extinguished. Nevertheless, maroon populations kept settlers away from the southern and western regions.

The greatest slave revolt occurred in July 1595, when the government was weakened by disputes between the bishop and the governor. A native slave named Amador recruited 5,000 slaves to raid and destroy plantations, sugar mills, and settler houses. Amador's rebellion made three raids on the town and destroyed 60 of the island's 85 sugar mills, but they were defeated by the militia after three weeks. Two hundred slaves were killed in combat, and Amador and the other rebel leaders were executed, while the rest of the slaves were granted amnesty and returned to their plantation. Smaller slave rebellions followed in the 17th and 18th centuries.

==== 18th, 19th and 20th centuries ====
Eventually, competition from sugar-producing colonies in the Western Hemisphere began to hurt the islands' economy. The large enslaved population also proved difficult to control, with Portugal unable to invest many resources in the effort. Sugar cultivation thus declined over the next 100 years, and by the mid-17th century, São Tomé had become primarily a transit point for ships engaged in the slave trade between continental Africa and the Americas.

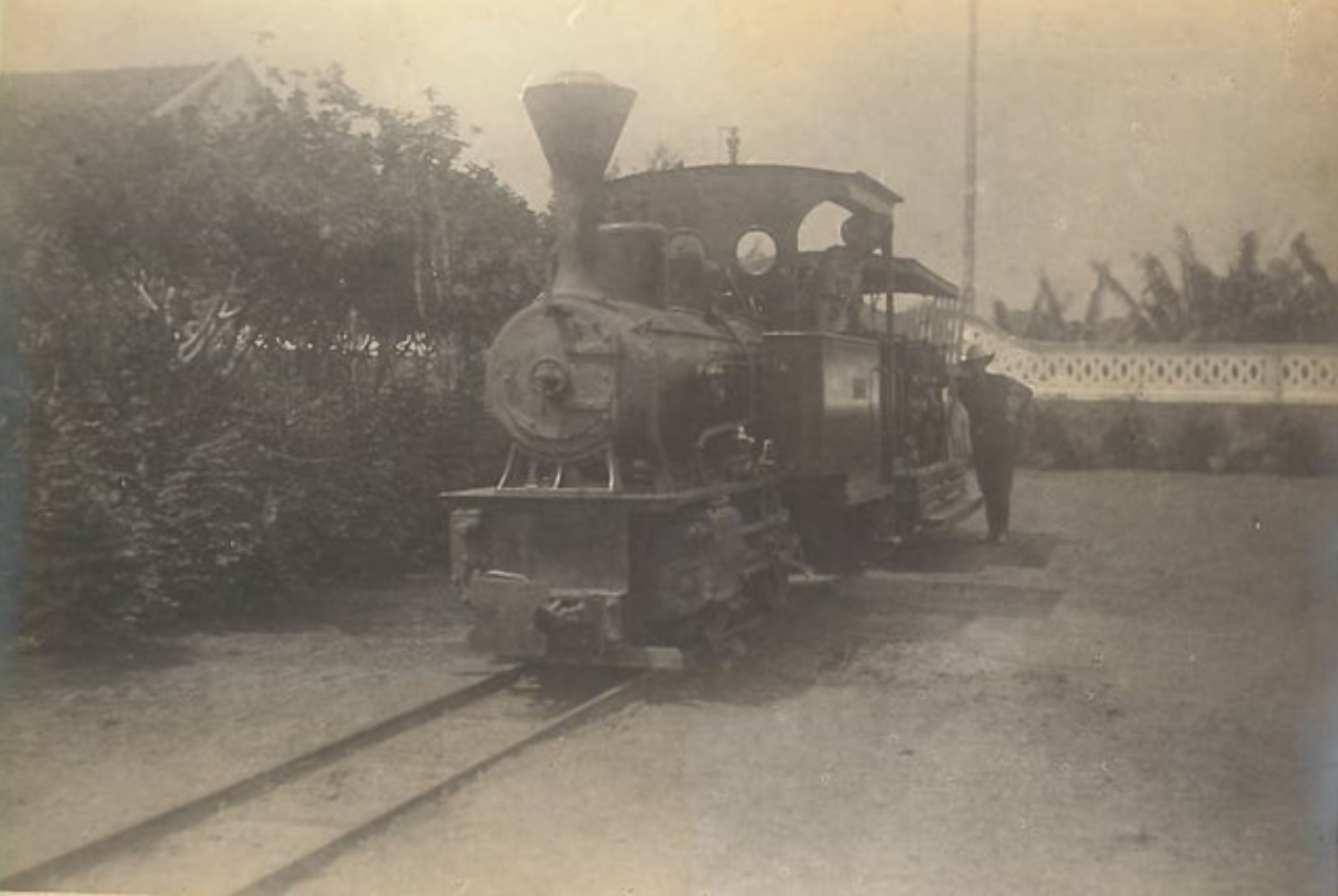
Railway in São Tomé and Príncipe c. 1919

In the early 19th century, two new cash crops, coffee and cocoa, were introduced. By 1905, São Tomé had become the world's largest producer of cocoa, which remains the country's most important crop.

The roças system, which gave the plantation managers a high degree of authority, led to abuses against the African farm workers. Although Portugal officially abolished slavery in 1876, the practice of forced paid labour continued. Scientific American documented in words and pictures the continued use of slaves in São Tomé in its 13 March 1897 issue.

Observations of the solar eclipse of 29 May 1919 in Príncipe by Sir Arthur Eddington provided one of the first successful tests of Albert Einstein's general theory of relativity.

In the early 20th century, an internationally publicized controversy arose over charges that Angolan contract workers were being subjected to forced labour and unsatisfactory working conditions. Sporadic labor unrest and dissatisfaction continued well into the 20th century, culminating in an outbreak of riots in 1953 in which several hundred African laborers were killed in a clash with their Portuguese rulers. The anniversary of this "Batepá Massacre" remains officially observed by the government.

=== Independence ===
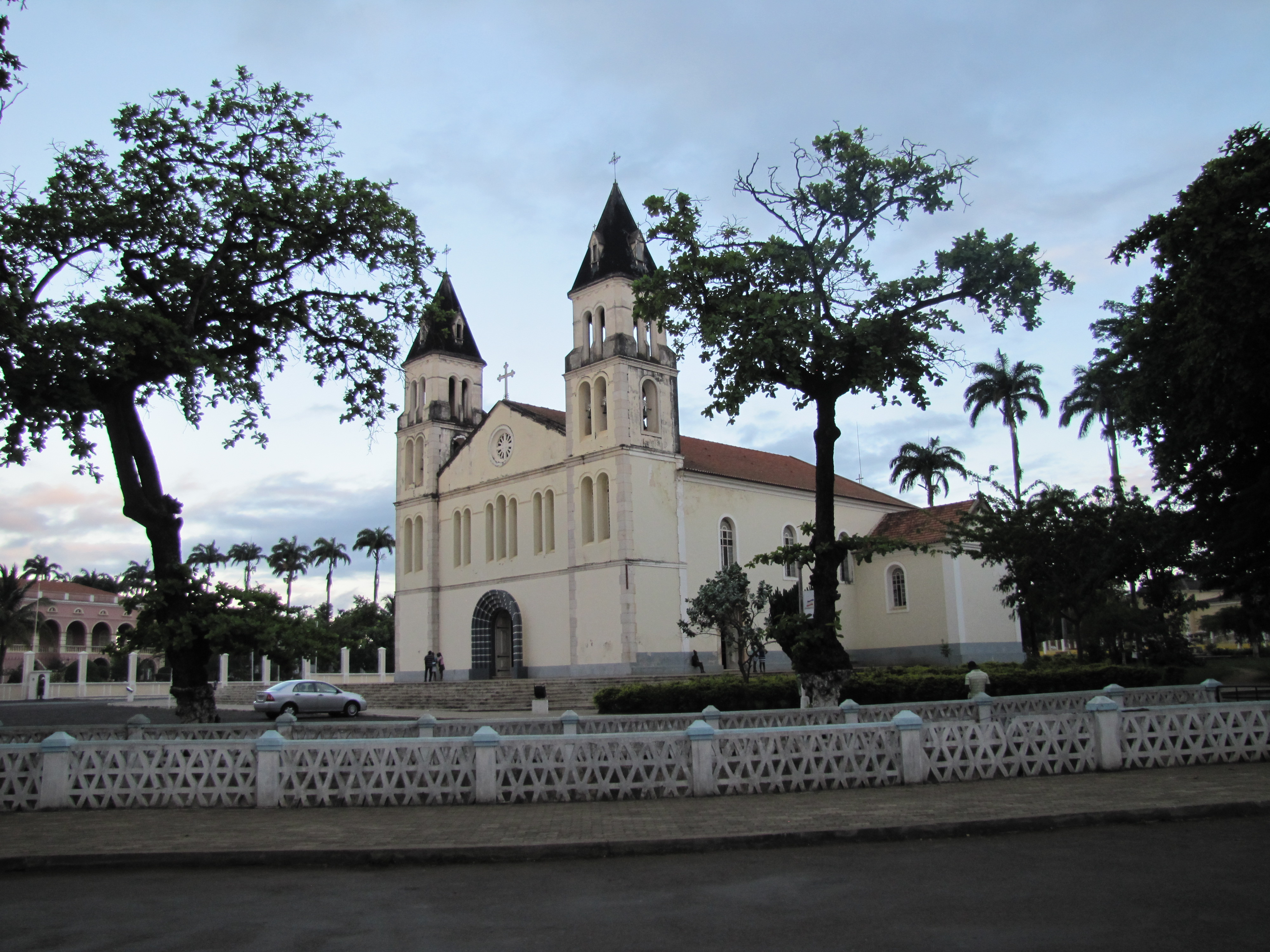
The Our Lady of Grace Cathedral of São Tomé

By the late 1950s, when other emerging nations across the African continent demanded their independence, a small group of São Toméans formed the Movement for the Liberation of São Tomé and Príncipe (MLSTP), which eventually established its base in nearby Gabon. Picking up momentum in the 1960s, events moved quickly after the overthrow of the Caetano dictatorship in Portugal in April 1974.

The new Portuguese regime was committed to the dissolution of its overseas colonies. In November 1974, its representatives met with the MLSTP in Algiers and worked out an agreement for the transfer of sovereignty. After a period of transitional government, São Tomé and Príncipe achieved independence on 12 July 1975, choosing as the first president the MLSTP Secretary General Manuel Pinto da Costa.

In 1990, São Tomé became one of the first African countries to undergo democratic reform, and changes to the constitution—including the legalization of opposition political parties—led to elections in 1991 that were non-violent, free, and transparent. Miguel Trovoada, a former prime minister who had been in exile since 1986, returned as an independent candidate and was elected president. Trovoada was re-elected in São Tomé's second multiparty presidential election in 1996.

The Party of Democratic Convergence won a majority of seats in the National Assembly, with the MLSTP becoming an important and vocal minority party. Municipal elections followed in late 1992, in which the MLSTP won a majority of seats on five of seven regional councils. In early legislative elections in October 1994, the MLSTP won a plurality of seats in the assembly. It regained an outright majority of seats in the November 1998 elections.

=== 21st century ===
In the 2001 presidential elections the candidate backed by the Independent Democratic Action party, Fradique de Menezes, was elected in the first round and inaugurated on 3 September. Parliamentary elections were held in March 2002. For the next four years, a series of short-lived opposition-led governments was formed.

In July 2003, the army seized power for one week, complaining of corruption and that forthcoming oil revenues would not be divided fairly. An accord was negotiated under which President de Menezes was returned to office. In March 2006, the cohabitation period ended, when a propresidential coalition won enough seats in National Assembly elections to form a new government.

In the 30 July 2006 presidential election, Fradique de Menezes easily won a second five-year term in office, defeating two other candidates, Patrice Trovoada (son of former president Miguel Trovoada) and independent Nilo Guimarães. Local elections, the first since 1992, took place on 27 August 2006 and were dominated by members of the ruling coalition. On 12 February 2009, a coup d'état was attempted to overthrow President Fradique de Menezes. The plotters were imprisoned, but later received a pardon from President de Menezes.

Evaristo Carvalho became the President of São Tomé and Príncipe in the 2016 elections, after winning over the incumbent President Manuel Pinto da Costa. President Carvalho is also vice president of the Independent Democratic Action party (ADI). Patrice Emery Trovoada became prime minister in 2014; he is also the leader of the Independent Democratic Action party (ADI). In December 2018, Jorge Bom Jesus, the leader of the Movimento de Libertação de São Tomé e Príncipe-Partido Social Democráta (MLSTP-PSD), was sworn in as new prime minister.

In September 2021, the candidate of the centre-right opposition Independent Democratic Action (ADI), Carlos Vila Nova, won the presidential election.

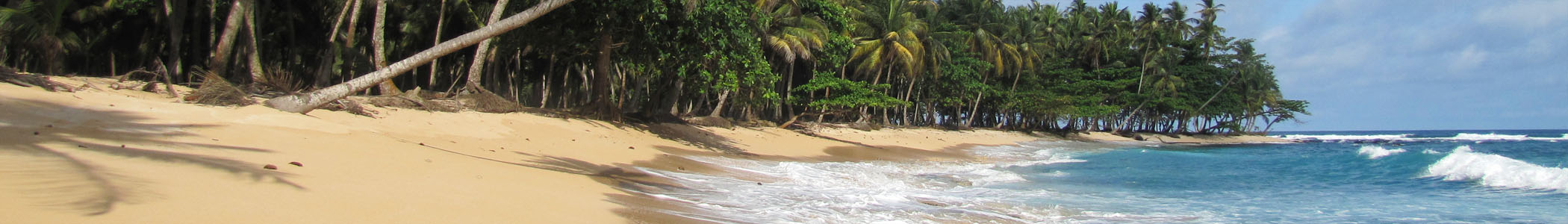
A view of Praia Inhame, Caué District, São Tomé

In September 2022, the opposition Independent Democratic Action (ADI), led by former prime minister Patrice Trovoada, won the election over the ruling Movement for the Liberation of Sao Tome and Principe/Social Democratic Party (MLSTP/PSD) of Prime Minister Jorge Bom Jesus. In November of the same year, the government and military thwarted an attempted coup d'état, after Patrice Trovoada was appointed prime minister of São Tomé and Príncipe by Carlos Vila Nova. Ilza Amado Vaz briefly served as Trovoada's successor from 9 January 2025 until the appointment of Américo Ramos on 12 January.

== Geography ==
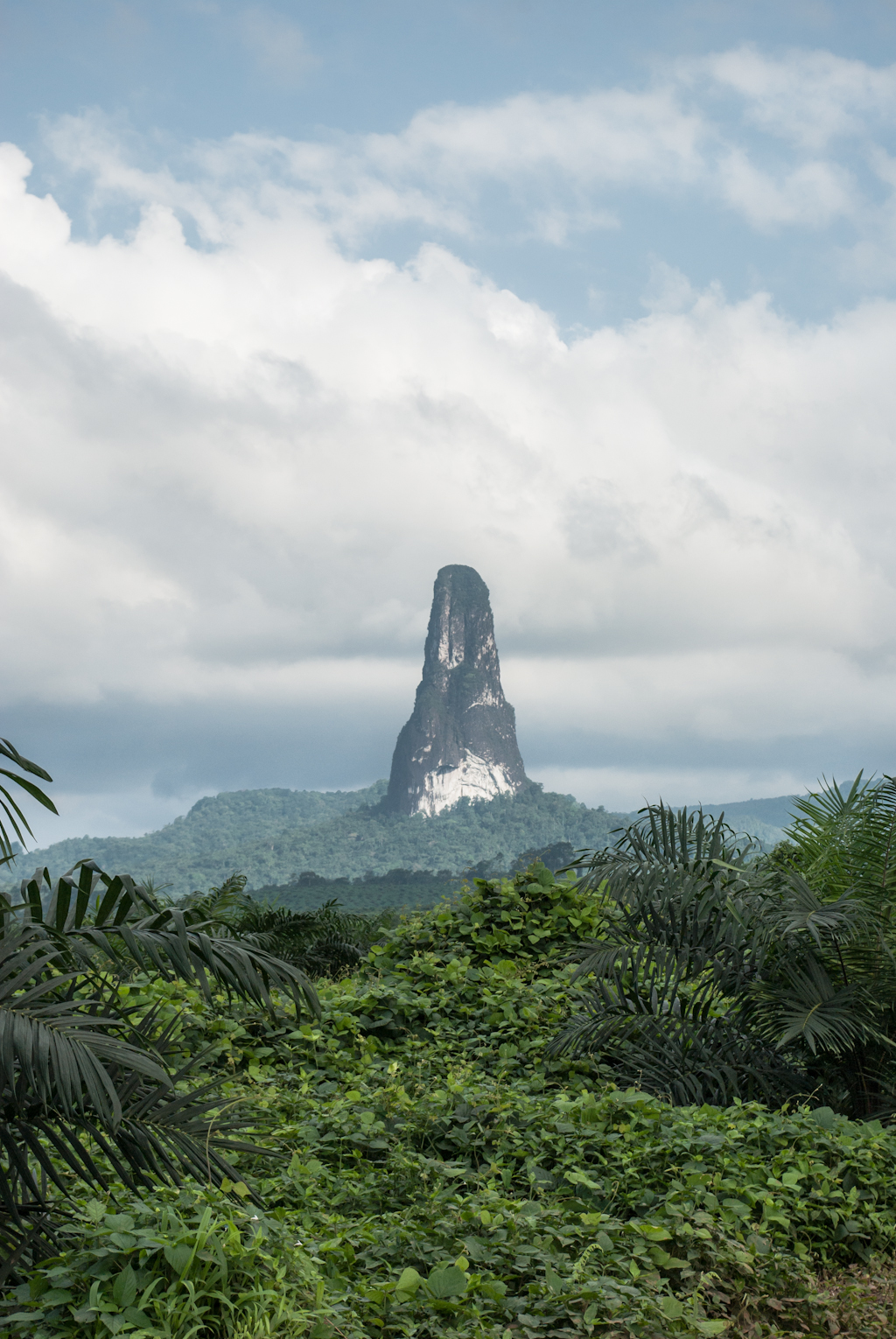
The Pico Cão Grande is a landmark needle-shaped volcanic plug peak in São Tomé and Príncipe.

The islands of São Tomé and Príncipe, situated in the equatorial Atlantic and Gulf of Guinea about 160 and 130 nautical miles (300 and 240 km; 180 and 150 mi), respectively, off the northwest coast of Gabon, constitute Africa's second-smallest country. Both are part of the Cameroon volcanic mountain line, which also includes the islands of Annobón to the southwest, Bioko to the northeast (both part of Equatorial Guinea), and Mount Cameroon on the coast of Gulf of Guinea. Both islands formed about 30 million years ago during the Oligocene era, due to volcanic activity beneath deep water along the Cameroon Line. The volcanic soils of basalts and phonolites, dating to 3 million years, have been used for plantation crops since colonial times.

São Tomé is 50 km (30 mi) long and 30 km (20 mi) wide and the more mountainous of the two islands. Its highest point, Pico de São Tomé, has an elevation of 2,024 metres (6,640 ft). Príncipe is about 30 km (20 mi) long and 6 km (4 mi) wide. Its highest point, Pico de Príncipe, reaches 948 metres (3,110 ft). The equator lies just south of São Tomé Island, passing through the islet Ilhéu das Rolas.

The Pico Cão Grande (Great Dog Peak) is a landmark volcanic plug peak in southern São Tomé. It rises over 300 metres (980 ft) above the surrounding terrain and the summit is 663 metres (2,175 ft) above sea level.

=== Climate ===
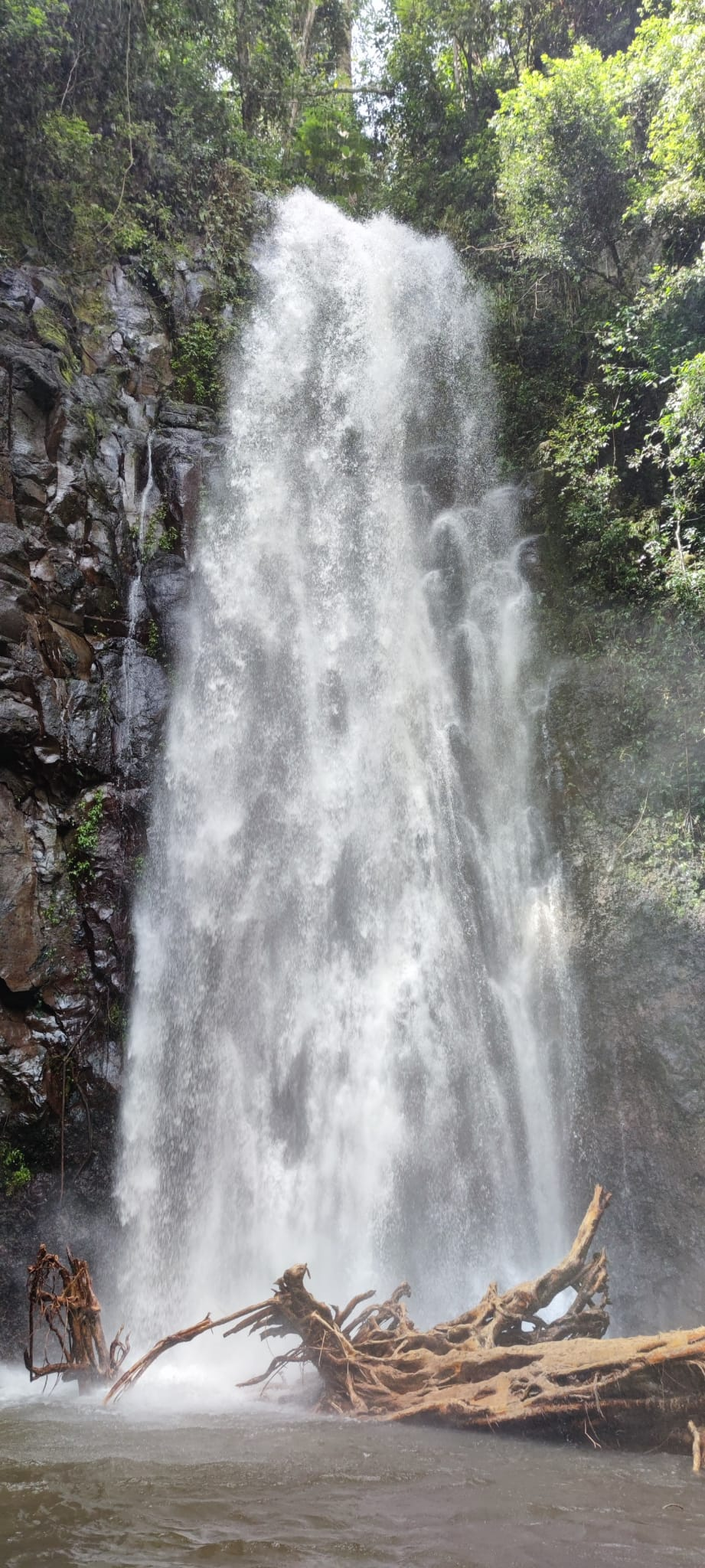
Waterfall in São Tomé Island

The climate of São Tomé and Príncipe is essentially conditioned by its geographic location, subject to the seasonal translation of low equatorial pressures, the monsoon winds from the south, the warm Guinea Current and the relief.

At sea level, the climate is tropical—hot and humid with average yearly temperatures of about 26 °C (78.8 °F) and little daily variation. The temperature rarely rises beyond 32 °C (89.6 °F). At the interior's higher elevations, the average yearly temperature is 20 °C (68 °F), and nights are generally cool. Annual rainfall varies from 7,000 millimetres (280 in) in the highland cloud forests to 800 millimetres (31 in) in the northern lowlands. The rainy season is from October to May.

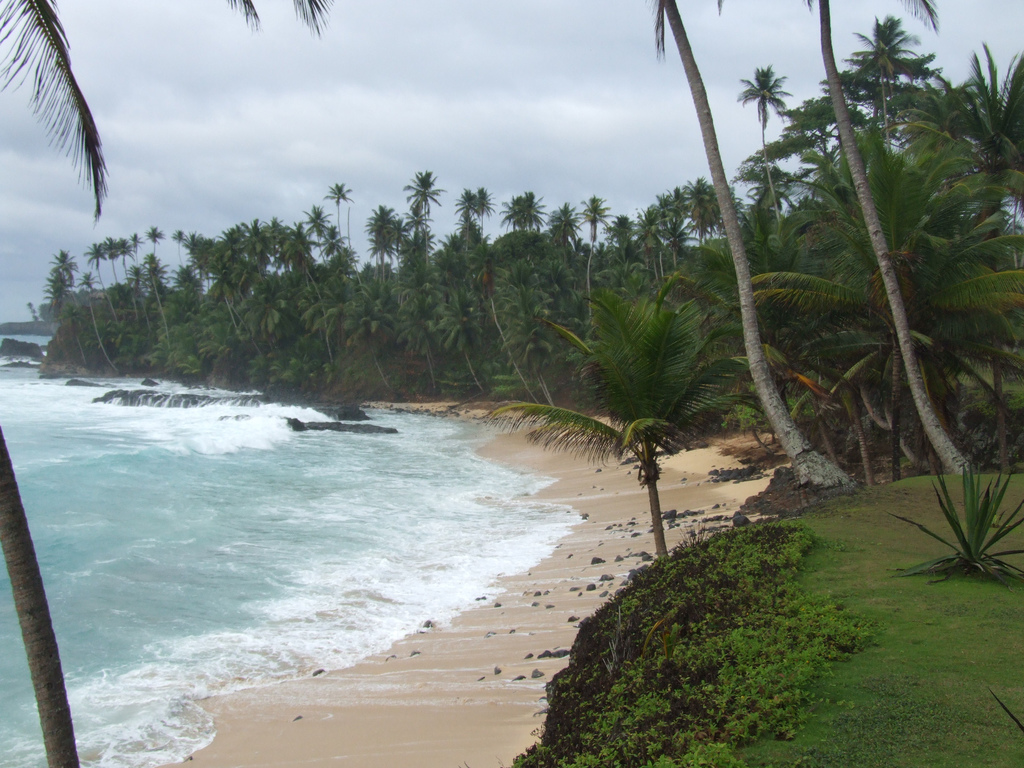
Ilhéu das Rolas

=== Biodiversity ===
The country's territory is part of the São Tomé, Príncipe, and Annobón moist lowland forests ecoregion. It had a 2019 Forest Landscape Integrity Index mean score of 6.64/10, ranking it 68th globally out of 172 countries. São Tomé and Príncipe does not have a large number of native mammals (although the São Tomé shrew and several bat species are endemic). The islands are home to a larger number of endemic birds and plants, including the world's smallest ibis (the São Tomé ibis), the world's largest sunbird (the giant sunbird), the rare São Tomé fiscal, and several giant species of Begonia. São Tomé and Príncipe is an important nesting site for marine turtles, including the hawksbill turtles (Eretmochelys imbricata).

In 2012, UNESCO established the Island of Príncipe Biosphere Reserve under the Man and the Biosphere Programme. The reserve encompasses the entire emerged area of the island of Príncipe, and its islets Bom Bom, Boné do Jóquei, Mosteiros, Santana, and Pedra da Galei, and the Tinhosas islands. The biosphere was extended in 2025 to São Tomé, making São Tomé and Príncipe the first country to be designated as such in its entirety.

== Politics ==
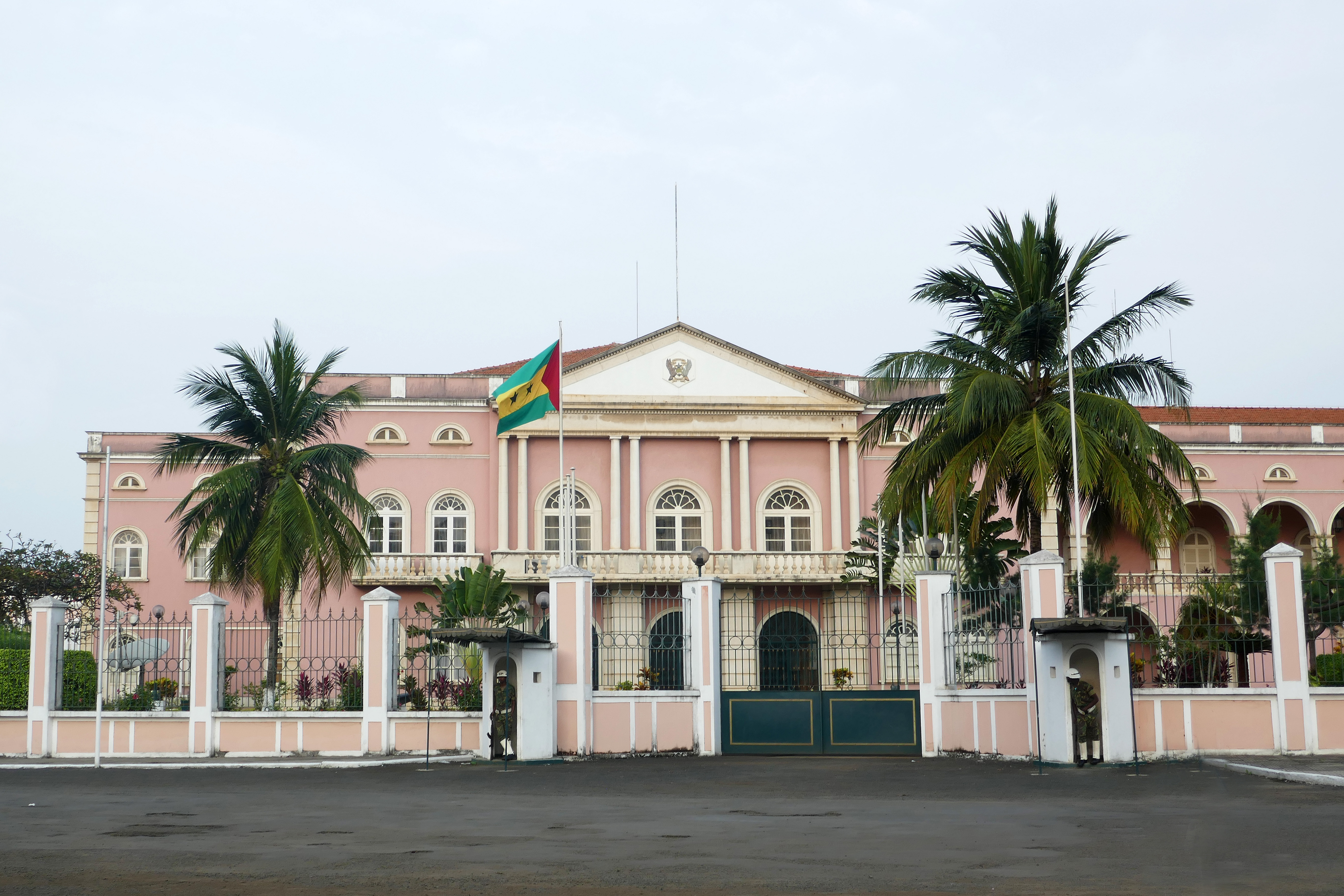
Presidential Palace of São Tomé e Príncipe

São Tomé and Príncipe is a unitary state operating under a semi-presidential system. The president of the republic is elected to a five-year term by direct universal suffrage and a secret ballot, and must gain an outright majority to be elected. The president may hold up to two consecutive terms. The prime minister is appointed by the president, and the 14 members of the cabinet are chosen by the prime minister.

The National Assembly, the supreme organ of the state and the highest legislative body, is made up of 55 members, who are elected for a four-year term and meet semiannually. Justice is administered at the highest level by the Supreme Court. The judiciary is independent under the current constitution.

São Tomé and Príncipe has functioned under a multiparty system since 1990. Concerning human rights, there are guarantees on freedom of speech and the freedom to form opposition political parties. The country finished 11th out of the African countries measured by the Ibrahim Index of African Governance in 2010, a comprehensive analysis of the standards of governance in Africa.

São Tomé and Príncipe is considered a free country, with very high freedom of speech, high political freedom and average economic freedom. In the 2023 V-Dem Democracy Indices, the country was ranked 56th among electoral democracies worldwide and 5th in Africa. It has an average level of corruption, although in recent years this level has been decreasing. In tourism terms, the risk is low, equivalent to the risk of visiting France.

=== Foreign relations ===
São Tomé and Príncipe has embassies in Angola, Belgium, Gabon, Portugal, and the United States. It recognized the People's Republic of China in 2016. It also has a permanent mission to the UN in New York City and an International Diplomatic Correspondent Office.

São Tomé and Príncipe is a founding member state of the Community of Portuguese Language Countries, also known as the Lusophone Commonwealth, an international organization and political association of Lusophone nations across four continents, where Portuguese is an official language.

The countries with the closest relations with São Tomé and Príncipe are Portugal and Angola.

==== Portugal ====
Portugal has historical ties with São Tomé and Príncipe, from the period of colonization by the Portuguese. Portugal is the largest investor in São Tomé and Príncipe, investing millions of euros in the economy. São Tomé and Príncipe maintains an embassy in Lisbon, a consulate in Porto and one in Coimbra. Portugal maintains an embassy in São Tomé. Portugal and São Tomé and Príncipe signed an agreement, in which Portugal patrols the coastal area of São Tomé and Príncipe, protecting it mainly from pirates. The Portuguese military ship NRP Zaire and some Portuguese patrol boats are permanently stationed on the coast of São Tomé and Príncipe. The economy of São Tomé and Príncipe is closely linked to that of Portugal, with Portugal accounting for more than 50% of exports from São Tomé and Príncipe. Portugal has helped to develop education in São Tomé and Príncipe, financially helping to build and maintain the Public University of São Tomé and Príncipe. The Portuguese President Marcelo Rebelo de Sousa visited São Tomé and Príncipe in 2018 to demonstrate the strong economic and cultural ties between Portugal and São Tomé and Príncipe.

In September 2022, Portugal and São Tomé and Príncipe signed a new cooperation agreement for defence, bolstering training and maritime security.

==== Angola ====
Angola is a major business partner mainly in the area of natural energy resources; Angola is the major supplier of oil and natural gas to São Tomé and Príncipe. In addition, hundreds of Angolan tourists visit São Tomé and Príncipe every year, contributing to the local economy. There is a relatively large community of Angolans in São Tomé and Príncipe. São Tomé and Príncipe maintains an embassy in Luanda and Angola maintains an embassy in São Tomé.

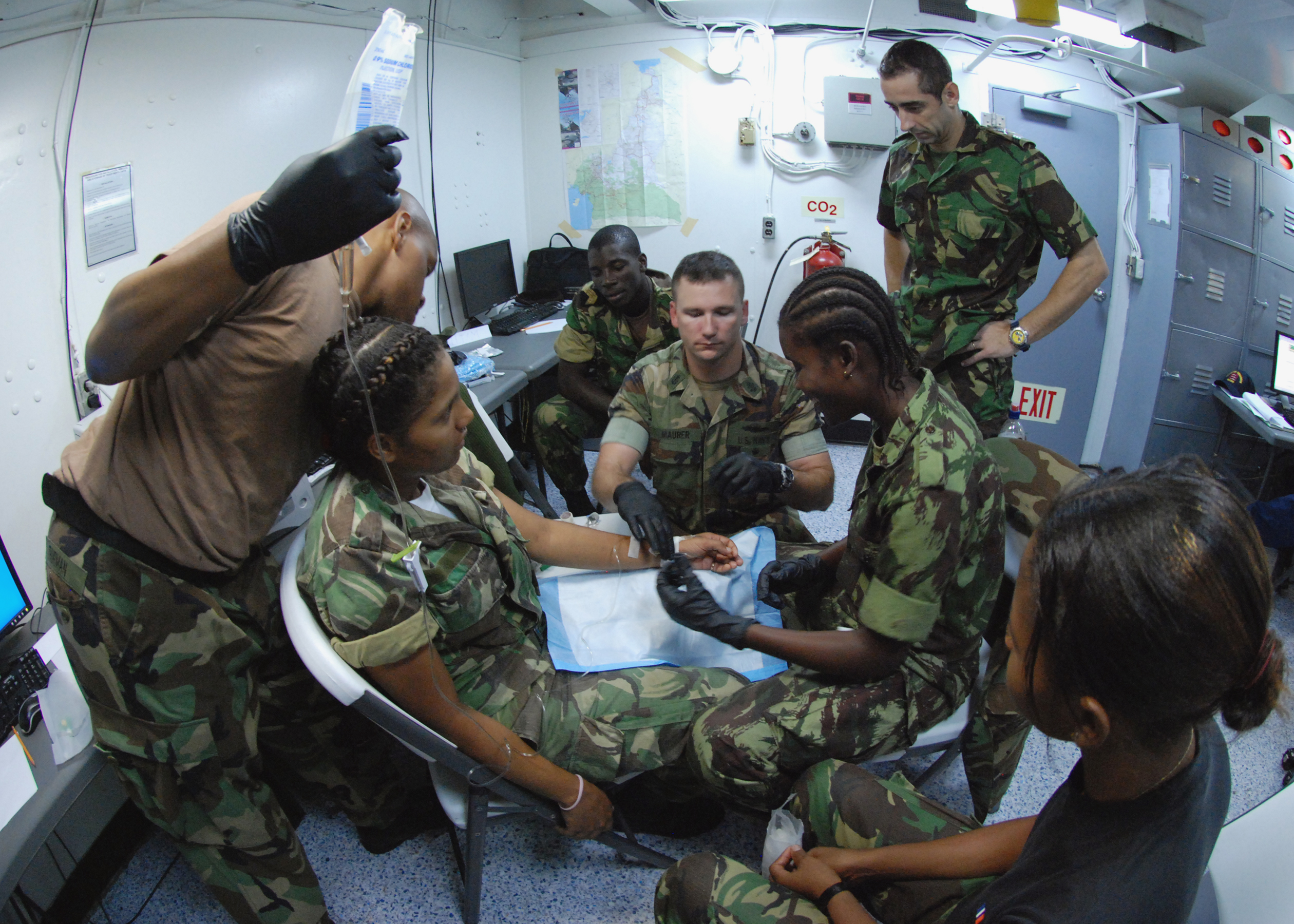
Santomean personnel undergo medical training with US Naval corpsmen

==== United States ====
The United States has had relations with São Tomé and Príncipe since 1975 and has offered millions of dollars in financial aid packages to São Tomé and Príncipe. The financial aid packages were designed to develop the country's infrastructure and improve its fiscal, tax and customs administration. In addition, in recent years, some US Coast Guard ships have visited São Tomé and Príncipe, providing medical and military training to soldiers from São Tomé and Príncipe. In 1992, the US federal government broadcaster, Voice of America, and the government of São Tomé signed a long-term agreement to establish a relay broadcasting station in São Tomé. Voice of America currently broadcasts to much of Africa from this facility. In 2002, the US had plans to establish a small military base on the island of São Tomé. São Tomé and Príncipe accepted the construction of the base, but the plan was canceled due to US political and financial issues.

==== Others ====
Thousands of tourists from Cape Verde visit São Tomé and Príncipe, helping the local economy. Relations between Cape Verde and São Tomé and Príncipe have improved over the years.

Brazil has contributed to improving the health and education system in São Tomé and Príncipe. Brazilian television channels and films are the most watched in São Tomé and Príncipe.

Neighboring Gabon, Cameroon, and the Republic of Congo are important partners in São Tomé and Príncipe; many companies in these countries have establishments and businesses in São Tomé and Príncipe. Because these countries speak French, the language has become important in the business sector (together with Portuguese), in São Tomé and Príncipe.

Since 2013, China has invested in some road and seaport projects but investments have been stalling in recent years.

=== Military ===
Coat of arms of São Tomé and Príncipe

São Tomé and Príncipe's military is small and consists of four branches: the Army (Exército), Coast Guard (Guarda Costeira also called "Navy"), Presidential Guard (Guarda Presidencial), and the National Guard.

In 2017, São Tomé and Príncipe signed the United Nations Treaty on the Prohibition of Nuclear Weapons.

=== Administrative divisions ===
In 1977, two years after independence, the country was divided into two provinces (São Tomé Province and Príncipe Province) and six districts. Since the new constitution was adopted in 1990, the provinces have been abolished, and the districts are the only administrative subdivisions. Since 29 April 1995, the island of Príncipe has been an autonomous region, coterminous with the district of Pagué. The larger island of São Tomé is divided into six districts and Príncipe island into one:

São Tomé Island

- Água Grande
- Cantagalo
- Caué
- Lembá
- Lobata
- Mé-Zóchi

Príncipe Island

- Pagué

== Economy ==
=== Agriculture ===
Since the 19th century, the economy of São Tomé and Príncipe has been based on plantation agriculture. At the time of independence, Portuguese-owned plantations occupied 90% of the cultivated area. After independence, control of these plantations passed to various state-owned agricultural enterprises. The main crop on São Tomé is cocoa, representing about 54% of agricultural exports. In the early 1900s, São Tomé and Príncipe was the world's largest exporter of cocoa and popularly known as the "Chocolate Islands". Other export crops include copra, palm kernels, and coffee.

Domestic food-crop production is inadequate to meet local consumption, so the country imports most of its food. As of 1997, an estimated 90% of the country's food needs were met through imports. Efforts have been made by the government in recent years to expand food production, and several projects have been undertaken, largely financed by foreign donors.

Other than agriculture, the main economic activities are fishing and a small industrial sector engaged in processing local agricultural products and producing a few basic consumer goods. The scenic islands have potential for tourism, and the government is attempting to improve its rudimentary tourist industry infrastructure. The government sector accounts for about 11% of employment.

Following independence, the country had a centrally directed economy, with most means of production owned and controlled by the state. The original constitution guaranteed a mixed economy, with privately owned cooperatives combined with publicly owned property and means of production.

=== Government measures ===
In the 1980s and 1990s, the economy of São Tomé encountered major difficulties. Economic growth stagnated, and cocoa exports dropped in both value and volume, creating large balance-of-payments deficits. Plantation land was seized, resulting in the complete collapse of cocoa production. At the same time, the international price of cocoa slumped.

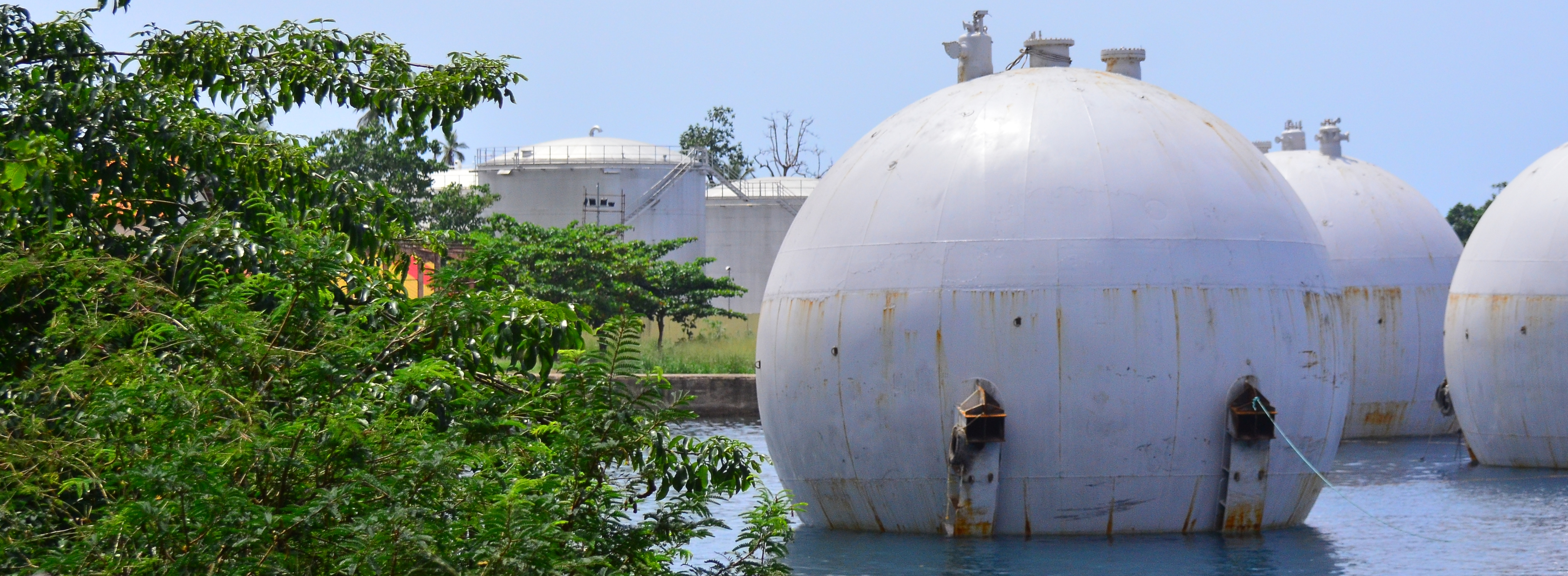
Oil and gas infrastructure in Neves, São Tomé and Príncipe

In response to its economic downturn, the government undertook a series of far-reaching economic reforms. In 1987, the government implemented an International Monetary Fund structural adjustment program, and invited greater private participation in management of the parastatals, as well as in the agricultural, commercial, banking, and tourism sectors. The focus of economic reform since the early 1990s has been widespread privatization, especially of the state-run agricultural and industrial sectors.

The São Toméan government has traditionally obtained foreign assistance from various donors, including the UN Development Programme, the World Bank, the European Union, Portugal, Taiwan, and the African Development Bank. In April 2000, in association with the Banco Central de São Tomé e Príncipe, the IMF approved a poverty-reduction and growth facility for São Tomé aimed at reducing inflation to 3% for 2001, raising ideal growth to 4%, and reducing the fiscal deficit.

In late 2000, São Tomé qualified for significant debt reduction under the IMF–World Bank's Heavily Indebted Poor Countries initiative. The reduction is being reevaluated by the IMF, due to the attempted coup d'état in July 2003 and subsequent emergency spending. Following the truce, the IMF decided to send a mission to São Tomé to evaluate the macroeconomic state of the country. This evaluation is ongoing, reportedly pending oil legislation to determine how the government will manage incoming oil revenues, which are still poorly defined, but in any case expected to change the economic situation dramatically.

In parallel, some efforts have been made to incentivize private tourism initiatives, but their scope remains limited.

São Tomé hosts a broadcasting station of the American International Broadcasting Bureau for the Voice of America at Pinheira.

Portugal remains one of São Tomé's major trading partners, particularly as a source of imports. Food, manufactured articles, machinery, and transportation equipment are imported primarily from the EU.

=== Economic challenges ===
In the past few years, the economy of São Tomé and Príncipe has grown, driven by agriculture, tourism and foreign investments, but mainly grew due to government spending driven by foreign loans. Gross domestic product (GDP) grew at an average rate of 5.5% between 2009 and 2017, but has slowed since 2014. The slowdown in economic growth was caused by lower government spending due to decreased foreign loans and decreased revenue from government taxes.

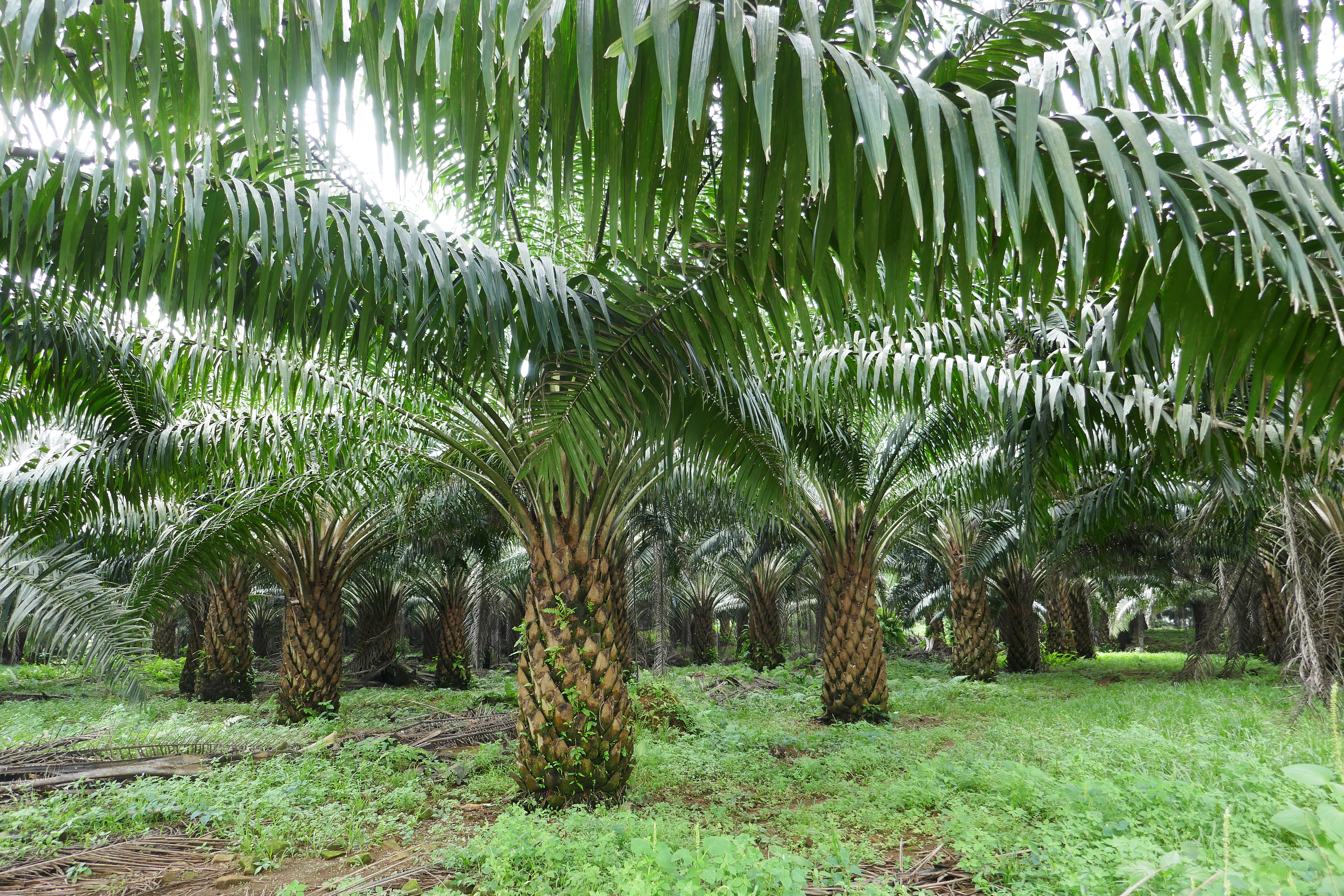
Palm tree plantations in Ribeira Peixe

The biggest challenges for the economy of São Tomé and Príncipe are a limited workforce, the fact that São Tomé and Príncipe is an archipelago, a small domestic market, climatic fluctuations, global warming, scarce diplomatic resources and poverty.

For long-term economic growth, the government is trying to stimulate various sectors of the economy, diversify the economy, cut government spending and encourage private sector and foreign investment.

=== Positive aspects ===
São Tomé and Príncipe outperforms the sub-Saharan Africa average on the Human Development Index and has made great progress on most social indicators. All children in São Tomé and Príncipe are enrolled in the education system, life expectancy has increased to 70 years, the infant mortality rate has decreased dramatically and the vast majority of the population already has access to piped water and access to electricity.

In terms of business, the government of São Tomé and Príncipe has passed several laws that facilitate the creation of private businesses and foreign investments. Between 2015 and 2019 the number of businesses and small businesses increased greatly. This has led to a decrease in unemployment, an increase in exports, and the creation of several manufacturers. In the coming years significant economic improvements are expected.

==== Tourism ====
The tourism sector has great potential to be a way of diversifying the country's economy. This sector has been expanding with the increase of foreign investment. Large resorts have been built on the beaches of São Tomé and Príncipe.

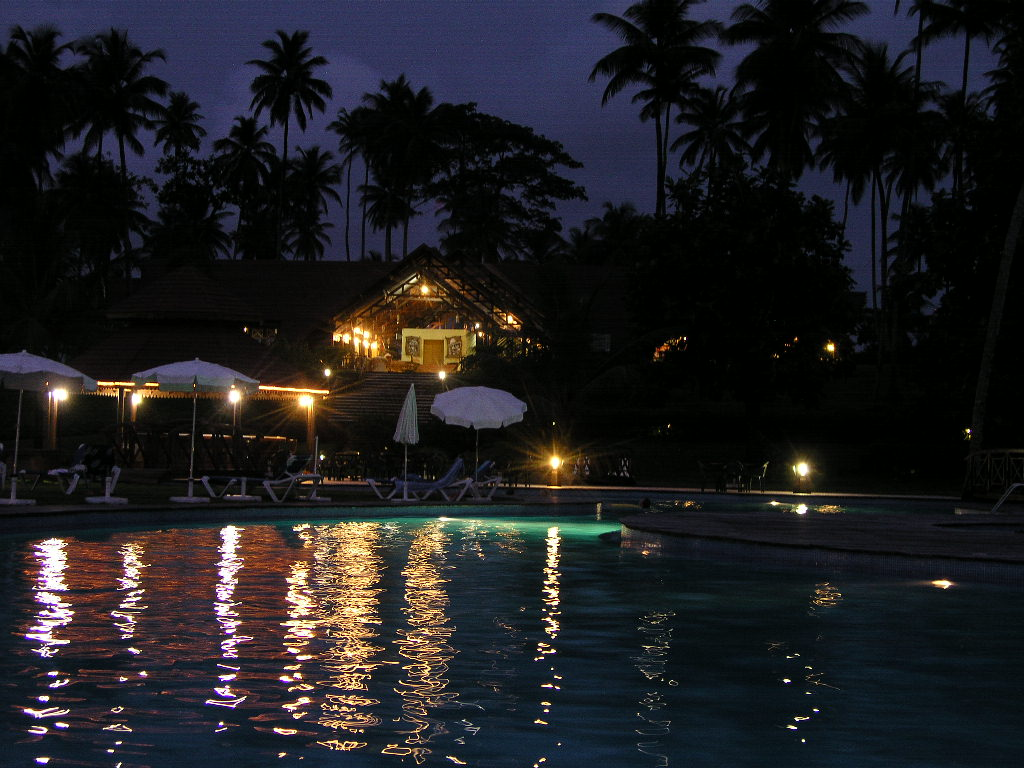
Resort Pestana Equador, São Tomé and Príncipe

==== Transport ====
The main ports in the country are in the city of São Tomé and Neves, both on the island of São Tomé, which were very degraded before being modernized in 2014. Close to the city of São Tomé, the international airport was expanded and modernized. The telephone system and the road network are good by African standards. Cellphones are widely used and improving. The Internet service is available and has been widely installed in urban areas.

=== Petroleum exploration ===
In 2001, São Tomé and Nigeria reached an agreement on joint exploration for petroleum in waters claimed by the two countries of the Niger Delta geologic province. After a lengthy series of negotiations, in April 2003, the joint development zone (JDZ) was opened for bids by international oil firms. The JDZ was divided into nine blocks; the winning bids for block one, ChevronTexaco, ExxonMobil, and Dangote Group, were announced in April 2004, with São Tomé to take in 40% of the $123 million bid, and Nigeria the other 60%. Bids on other blocks were still under consideration in October 2004. São Tomé has received more than $2 million from the bank to develop its petroleum sector.

=== Banking ===
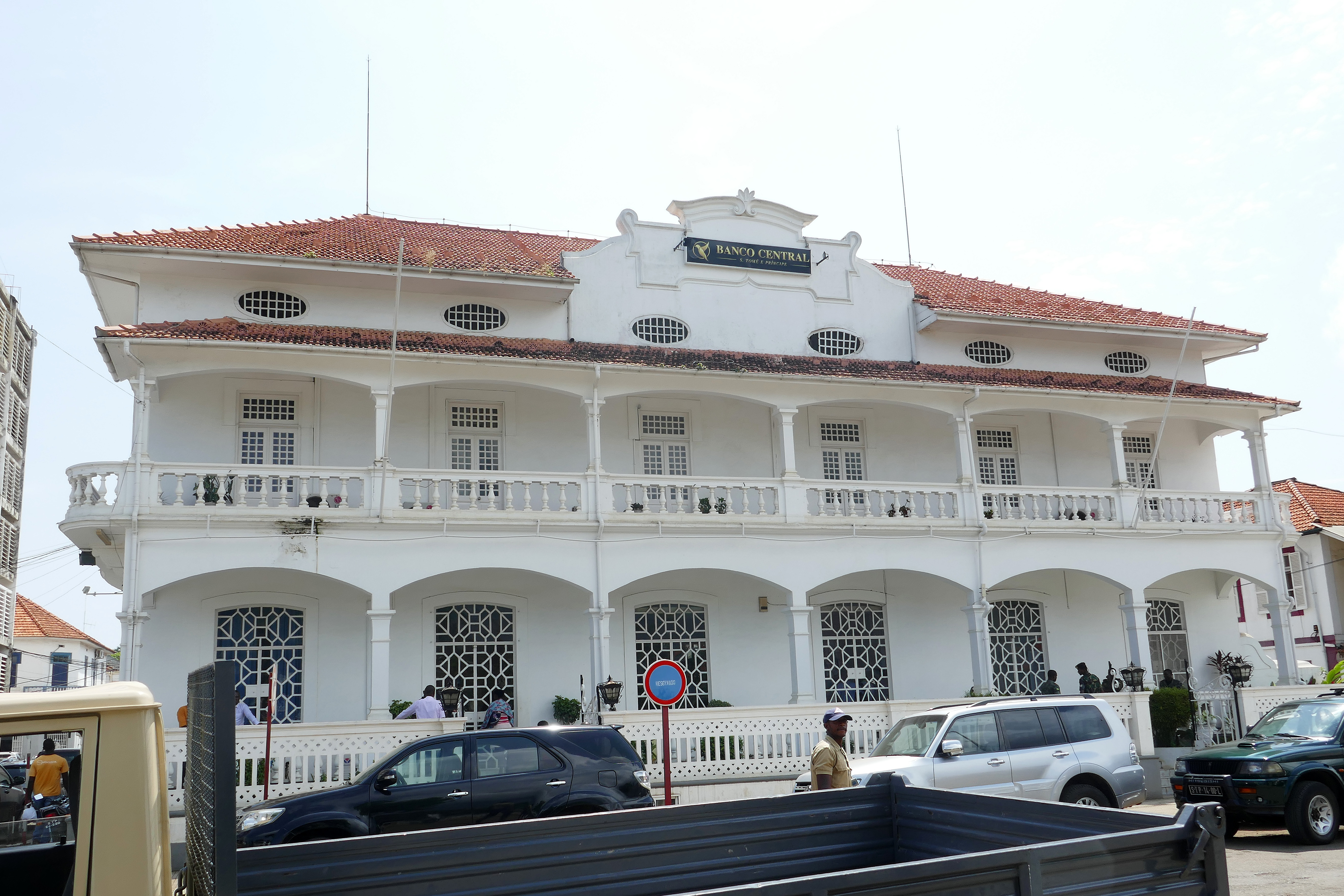
Central Bank of São Tomé and Príncipe

The Central Bank of São Tomé and Príncipe (Banco Central de São Tomé e Príncipe) is responsible for monetary policy and bank supervision. There are six banks in the country; the largest and oldest is Banco Internacional de São Tomé e Príncipe, which is a subsidiary of Portugal's government-owned Caixa Geral de Depósitos. It had a monopoly on commercial banking until a change in the banking law in 2003 led to the entry of several other banks.

=== Business partners ===
In 2018, exports from São Tomé and Príncipe totaled 24 million euros, compared to 11 million euros in 2013. Half of São Tomé and Príncipe's exports are cocoa beans. One fifth of exports are electrical machines. Other considerable exports are parts of airplanes, cars, iron, plastics and agricultural products (pepper, oils, nuts and beef).

The main destinations for exports from São Tomé and Príncipe are Europe, where the Netherlands (19%), Portugal (14%), Poland (13%), France (7%) and Germany (6%) stand out. Others important buyers are Singapore, Japan, Brazil and the United States.

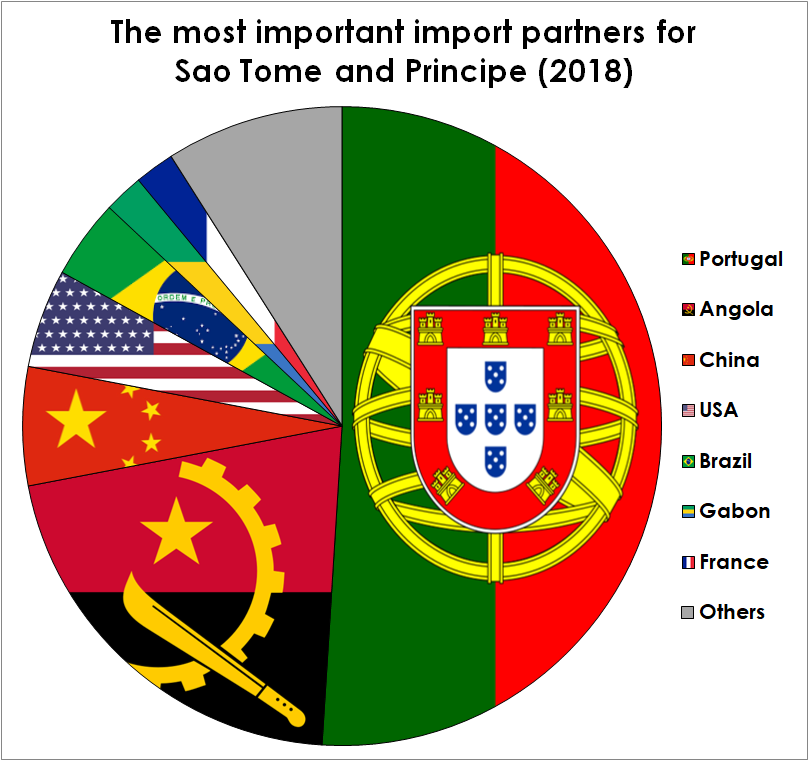
The most important import partners of São Tomé and Príncipe (2018)

In the last 10 years, the countries in which the value of exports increased the most were Portugal, Poland, Brazil and the Netherlands. There was a sharp decrease in exports from São Tomé and Príncipe to Angola, Mexico and India.

In 2018, imports to São Tomé and Príncipe totalled 161 million dollars. Since 2013, imports have been decreasing, albeit at a slow pace, since in 2013 imports totalled 167 million euros. A fifth of imports to São Tomé and Príncipe corresponded to refined oil (mainly from Angola). Other important imports, in order of importance, were cars, rice, cereals, wine, electronic equipment, chemicals, clothing, meat, medical equipment, and wood.

About 51% of the imports of São Tomé and Príncipe come from Portugal. A fifth of imports come from Angola, about 6% come from China, 4% from the United States, 4% from Brazil, 2% from Gabon and 2% from France.

In the last 10 years, the value of imports increased most from the countries of Portugal, Angola and China. There was a sharp decrease in imports from Thailand, Italy and Nigeria.

São Tomé and Príncipe imports mostly machines, mainly electric generators and computers, and food, mainly wine, wheat, rice, milk, and soy oil, from Portugal. In addition, São Tomé and Príncipe also imports considerable quantities of cars, soap, and iron from Portugal. Portugal mainly buys scrap material, copper, cocoa, and clothing.

== Demographics ==
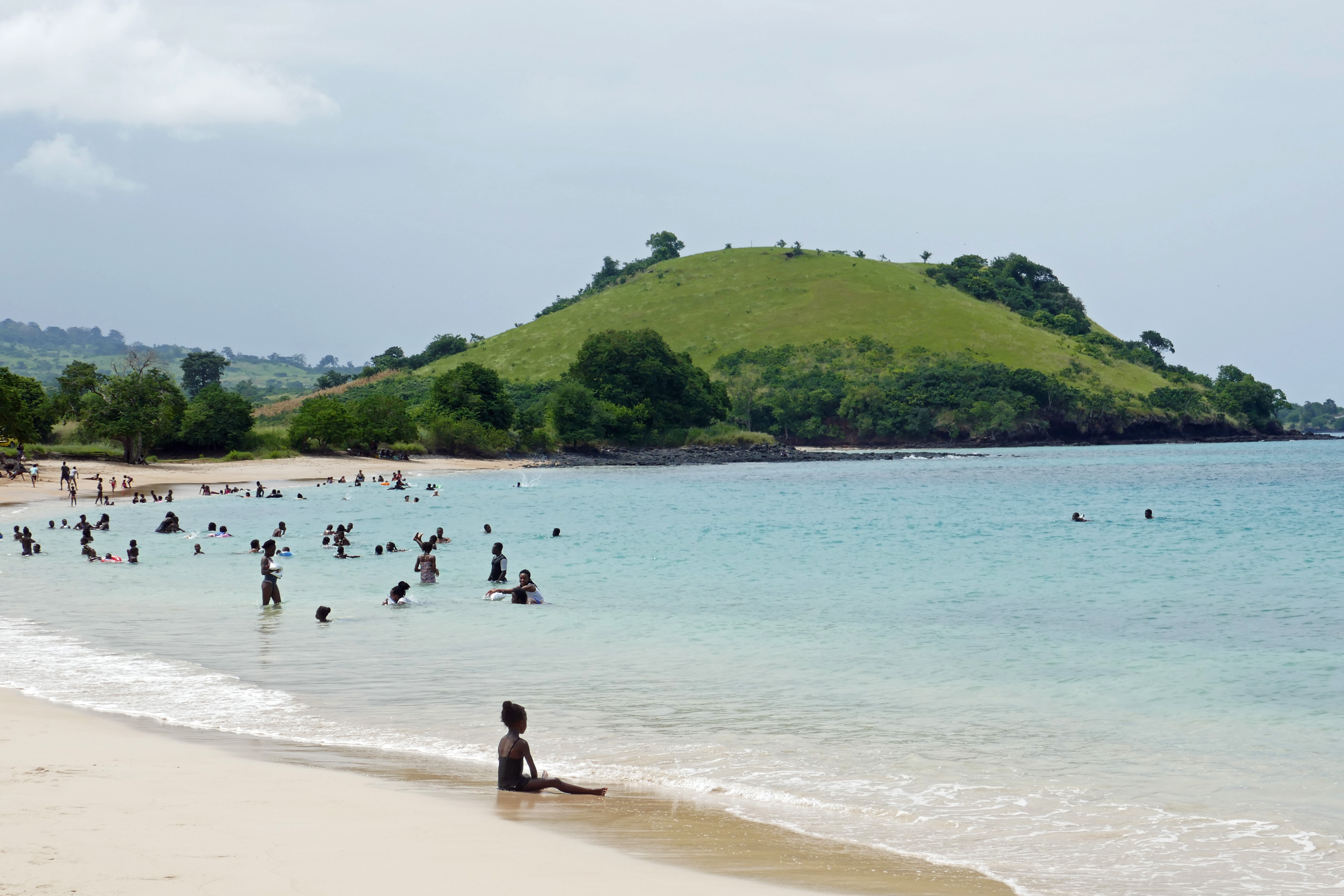
Santomeans on the beach, Lobata District

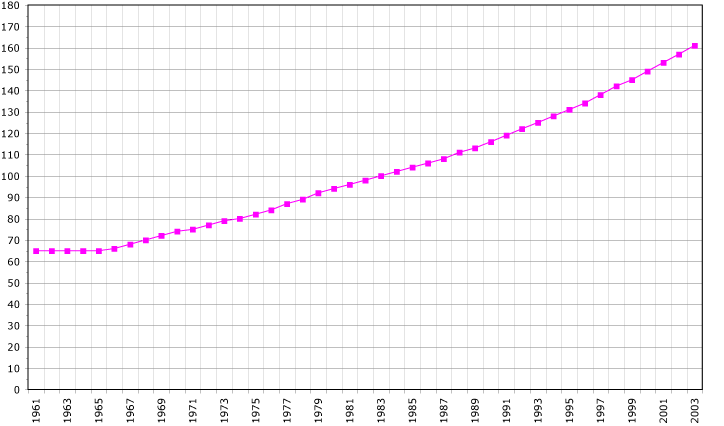
São Tomé and Príncipe's population in thousands between 1961 and 2003

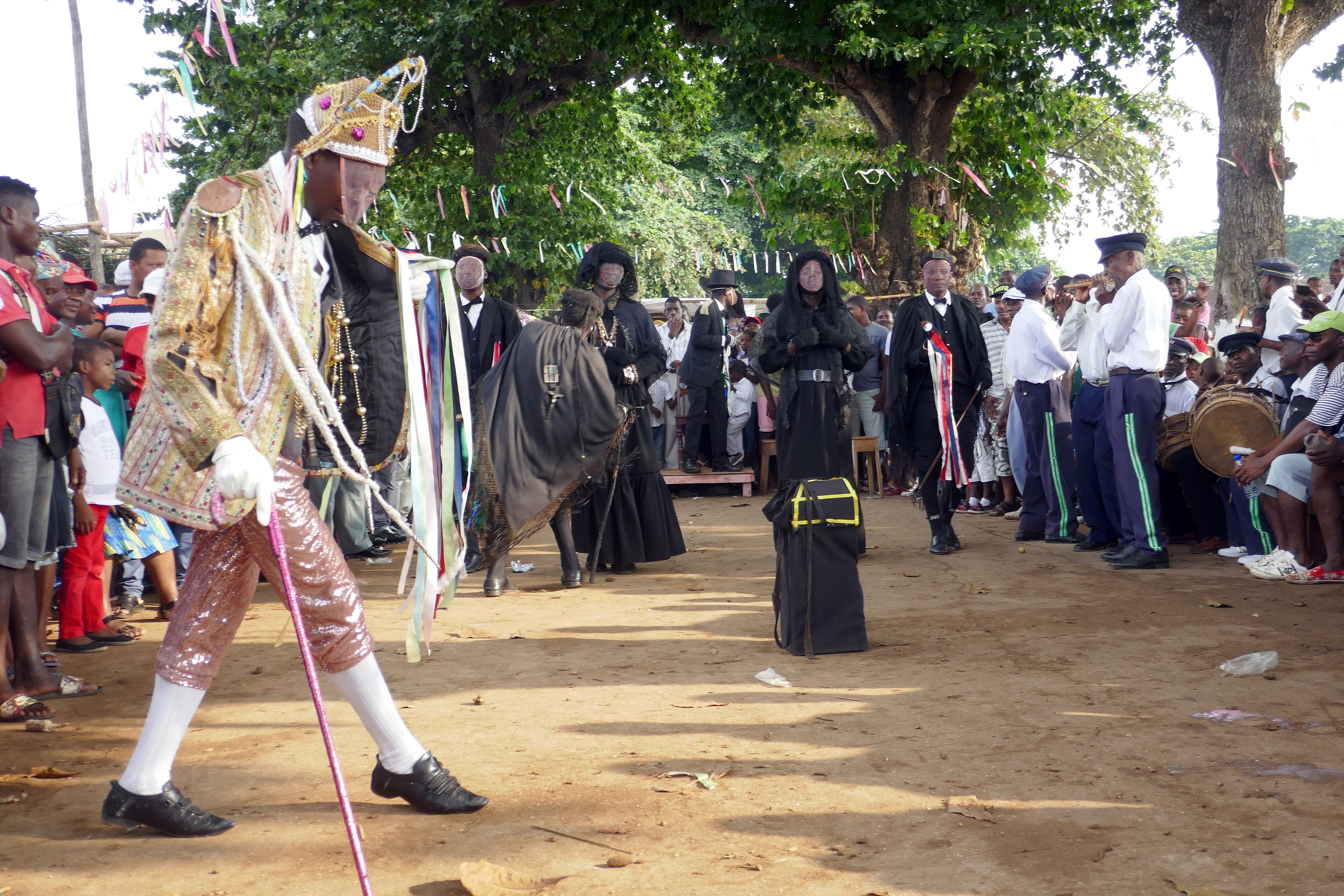
A scene of Santomean Tchiloli, Auto de Floripes Festival

The total population was estimated at 201,800 in May 2018 by the government agency. About 193,380 people live on São Tomé and 8,420 on Príncipe. The natural population increase is about 4,000 people per year.

Nearly all citizens are descended from people from different countries taken to the islands by the Portuguese from 1470 onwards. In the 1970s, two significant population movements occurred: the exodus of most of the 4,000 Portuguese residents and the influx of several hundred São Tomé refugees from Angola.

=== Ethnic groups ===
Distinct ethnic groups on São Tomé and Príncipe include:

- Luso-Africans, or "mixed-blood", are descendants of Portuguese colonists and African slaves brought to the islands during the early years of settlement from Benin, Gabon, the Republic of the Congo, the Democratic Republic of the Congo, and Angola (these people also are known as filhos da terra or "children of the land").
- Angolares are reputedly descendants of Angolan slaves who survived a 1540 shipwreck and now earn their livelihood fishing.
- Forros are descendants of slaves freed when slavery was abolished.
- Serviçais are contract laborers from Angola, Mozambique, and Cape Verde, living temporarily on the islands.
- Tongas are children of serviçais born on the islands.
- Europeans, primarily Portuguese
- Asians, mostly Chinese, including Macanese people of mixed Portuguese and Chinese descent from Macau

=== Languages ===
Languages in São Tomé and Príncipe
Languages	percent
Portuguese	98.4%
Forro Creole	36.2%
Cabo Verdean Creole	8.5%
Angolar Creole	6.6%
French	6.8%
English	4.9%
Other	2.4%
Principense Creole	1%

Portuguese is the official and the de facto national language of São Tomé and Príncipe, with about 98.4% speaking it, a significant share as their native language, and it has been spoken in the islands since the end of the 15th century. Portuguese creoles are also spoken: Forro, a creole language (36.2%), Cape Verdean Creole (8.5%), Angolar Creole (6.6%), and Principense Creole (1%). French (6.8%) and English (4.9%) are foreign languages taught in schools.

=== Religion ===
Religion in São Tomé and Príncipe:
1. Catholic Church (71.9%)
2. Other Christian (10.2%)
3. Other or Non-Religious (17.9%)

The majority of residents belong to the local branch of the Catholic Church, which in turn retains close ties with the church in Portugal. Sizeable Protestant minorities of Seventh-day Adventists and other Evangelical Protestants exist, as well as a small but growing Muslim population.

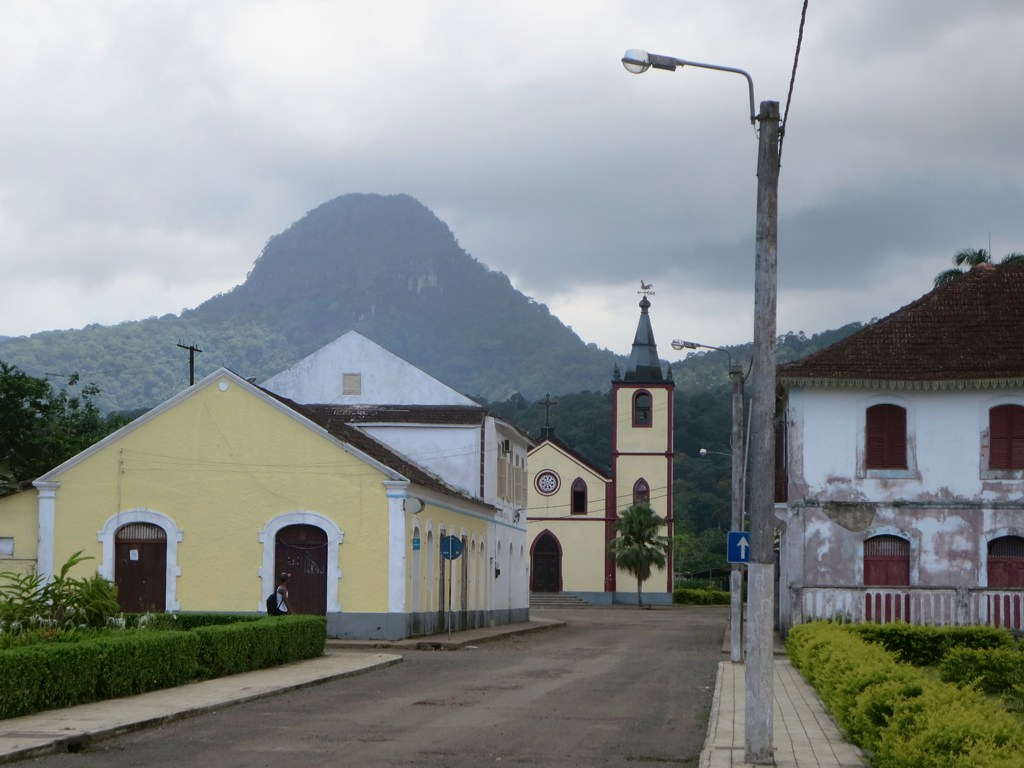
Nossa Senhora do Rosário Church, in Santo António

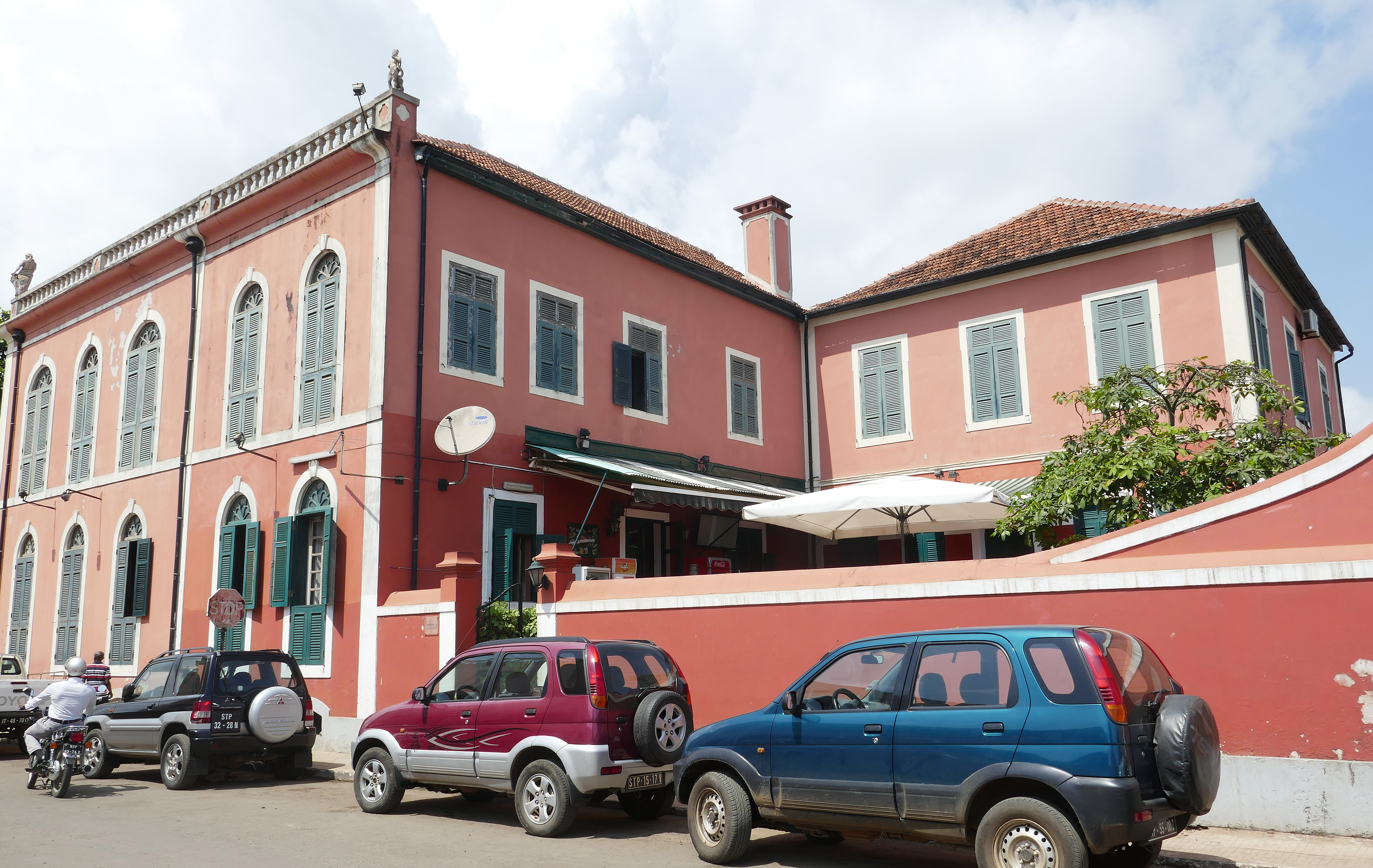
Casa da Cultura, São Tomé and Príncipe

=== Health ===
See Health in São Tomé and Príncipe

=== Education ===
Among sub-Saharan African countries, São Tomé and Príncipe has one of the highest literacy rates. According to The CIA World Factbook as of 2018, 92.8% of the population age 15 and over in São Tomé and Príncipe were respectively literate. The Human Rights Measurement Initiative (HRMI) finds that Sao Tome and Principe is fulfilling only 83.8% of its expected commitments to the right to education based on the country's level of income. HRMI breaks down the right to education by looking at the rights to both primary education and secondary education. While taking into consideration Sao Tome and Principe's income level, the nation is achieving 90.4% of what should be possible based on its resources (income) for primary education but only 77.2% for secondary education.

Education in São Tomé and Príncipe is compulsory for six years. Primary school enrollment and attendance rates were unavailable for São Tomé and Príncipe as of 2001.

The educational system has a shortage of classrooms, insufficiently trained and underpaid teachers, inadequate textbooks and materials, high rates of repetition, poor educational planning and management, and a lack of community involvement in school management. Domestic financing of the school system is lacking, leaving the system highly dependent on foreign financing.

Tertiary institutions are the National Lyceum and the University of São Tomé and Príncipe.

== Culture ==
São Toméan culture is a mixture of African and Portuguese influences.

=== Music ===
São Toméans are known for ússua and socopé rhythms, while Príncipe is home to the dêxa beat. Portuguese ballroom may have played an integral part in the development of these rhythms and their associated dances.

Tchiloli is a musical dance performance that tells a dramatic story. The danço-Congo is similarly a combination of music, dance, and theatre.

=== Literature ===
São Tomé and Príncipe's Portuguese-language literature and poetry is considered some of the richest in Lusophone Africa. Other literature from the country has been written in Forro Creole, English and Caué Creole. Francisco José Tenreiro is considered one of the country's most influential writers. Other notable literary figures include Manuela Margarido, Alda Espírito Santo, Olinda Beja and Conceição Lima.

=== Cuisine ===
Staple foods include fish, seafood, beans, maize, bread fruit, and cooked banana. Tropical fruits, such as pineapple, avocado, and bananas, are significant components of the cuisine. The use of hot spices is prominent in São Tomése cuisine. Coffee is used in various dishes as a spice or seasoning. Breakfast dishes are often reheated leftovers from the previous evening's meal, and omelettes are popular.

=== Sports ===
Football (soccer) is the most popular sport in São Tomé and Principe, the São Tomé and Príncipe national football team is the national association football team of São Tomé and Príncipe and is controlled by the São Toméan Football Federation. It is a member of the Confederation of African Football (CAF) and FIFA.

== See also ==
- Outline of São Tomé and Príncipe
- List of São Tomé and Príncipe–related topics
