= Principense Creole =

Portuguese-based creole of São Tomé and Príncipe

- Lunguyê
- Native to: São Tomé and Príncipe
- Native speakers: 200 (2021)
- Language family: Portuguese-based creole: Lower Guinea; Principense Creole

Language codes
- ISO 639-3: pre
- Glottolog: prin1242
- Linguasphere: 51-AAC-acb
- Location of São Tomé and Príncipe

Principense Creole (endonym: Lunguyê) is a Portuguese-based creole language spoken in São Tomé and Príncipe, specifically the island of Príncipe. There are two Portuguese creoles on the island of São Tomé, Angolar and Forro. Today, younger generations of São Toméans are not likely to speak Principense, which has led to its fast decline and moribund status. It is mostly spoken by the elderly (Ethnologue gives a figure of approximately 200 native speakers in total), while most of the island's community speaks noncreole Portuguese; some also speak another, closely related creole, Forro.

Principense presents many similarities with the Forro on São Tomé and may be regarded as a Forro dialect. Like Forro, it is a creole language heavily lexified by Portuguese with substrates of Bantu and Kwa.
