= Forro Creole =

Portuguese-based creole of São Tomé and Príncipe

- Sãotomense
- forro, santomense
- Native to: São Tomé and Príncipe
- Native speakers: (70,000 cited 1999)
- Language family: Portuguese Creole: Lower Guinea; Forro Creole

Language codes
- ISO 639-3: cri
- Glottolog: saot1239
- Linguasphere: 51-AAC-aca
- Location of São Tomé and Príncipe

Forro Creole (forro) or Sãotomense (santomense) is a Portuguese-based creole language spoken in São Tomé and Príncipe.

It should not be confused with São Tomean Portuguese, the non-creolised form of Portuguese spoken in São Tomé and Príncipe by the majority of São Toméans.

== History ==
São Tomé is an island of the Gulf of Guinea, discovered by the Portuguese in the 15th century. It was uninhabited at the time, but Portuguese settlers used the island as a center of the slave trade, and there was a need for slaves on the island. It has been theorised that since both parties needed to communicate, a pidgin was formed. The substrate languages were from the Bantu and Kwa groups. It is believed that this pidgin then became fixed (creolized) as it became the mother language of children born from Portuguese men and African women slaves. Mixed marriages were then encouraged by the Portuguese Crown, for the sake of settlement.

Later, because of Dutch and French pressure to gain the island, many Portuguese settlers left. Children of Portuguese and black women were, eventually, not considered African or slaves; some were considered full right Portuguese citizens. Those mixed-race people that did not have the status of Portuguese citizens, those with darker skin, often gained a "forro" designation, because their Portuguese fathers did not want to enslave their children. The São Tomean Creole is mostly known as "Forro", the language of the freed slaves or Crioulo Santomense, not to be confused with São Tomean Portuguese (a variety and dialect of Portuguese in São Tomé and Príncipe). Portuguese is the main language for children until their early 20s, when they relearn Forro Creole. The rich São Tomean culture also preserves a unique mixture of Portuguese and African cultures. European Portuguese is mostly spoken in formal situations, in the media, business, education, judicial system and legislature, while Forro and Sao Tomean Portuguese are preferred for informal situations as a vernacular language in day-to-day life and daily activities, and code switching even occurs between Forro, standard European Portuguese, and São Tomean Portuguese in informal speech.

== Classification and related languages ==
Forro is a creole language with a majority of its lexicon coming from Portuguese, the superstrate language. The substrate languages were from the Bantu and Kwa groups. It is similar to two other creoles spoken in the country (Principense Creole and Angolar Creole) as well as to the creole found in the island of Annobón, Equatorial Guinea (Annobonese Creole).

== Geographic distribution ==
Forro Creole is spoken mainly in São Tomé Island (most of it); there are some speakers in Principe Island.

Due to their great similarity and historical derivation, Principe Island's Principense Creole and Equatorial Guinea's Annobonese Creole may be regarded as dialects of Forro Creole. Forro's lexical similarity is 77% with Principense Creole, 62% with Fa d’Ambu Creole and 70% with Angolar Creole.

== Vocabulary ==
Although the São Tomean Creole had (and still has) a restricted contact with Portuguese (seen as a prestigious language), it did preserve a larger number of the substrate languages' elements, more than the creoles of Cape Verde. Roughly 93% of São Tomean Creole lexicon is from Portuguese and 7% of African origin. Most Forro Creole speakers also speak non-creolised Portuguese.

Although 95% of São Tomeans speak Portuguese and it is the country's national language, Forro Creole is traditionally said to be spoken by 85% of the inhabitants of São Tomé Island, or 81.7% of the country's population. However, official census figures state that only 36.2% of the population can speak Forro Creole, and the creole is now considered threatened.

== Writing system ==
Forro was and is largely an oral language; there is no standard orthography.

== Examples ==
Hello: Seja lovadu! (proposed: sejalovadu); From Port. seja louvado
Good Morning: Bom dja ô (proposed: Bondja o); From Port. bom dia
Good Afternoon: Bos tadji ô (proposed: Boxtadji o); From Port. boas tardes or boa tarde
Good Evening: Boj notxi ô (proposed: Bojnotxi o); From Port. boas noites or boa noite
What's your name: Que nomi bo e? (proposed: Ke nomi bo e?); possibly from Port. qual é o teu nome? or como te chamas?
My name's Pedro: Nomi mu sa Pedro; possibly from Port. o meu nome é Pedro.

Not everything is from Portuguese:

I live in Neves (São Tomean city): Nga-ta Tlaxa. (-ta is from está and tlaxa is from praça)
