= Angolar Creole =

Portuguese-based creole of São Tomé and Príncipe

- n'golá
- Native to: São Tomé and Príncipe
- Native speakers: 8,000 (2019)
- Language family: Portuguese Creole: Lower Guinea; Angolar Creole

Language codes
- ISO 639-3: aoa
- Glottolog: ango1258
- Linguasphere: 51-AAC-ad

Angolar Creole (Angolar: n'golá) is a Portuguese-based creole language of São Tomé and Príncipe, spoken in the southernmost towns of São Tomé Island and sparsely along the coast, especially by Angolar people. It is also called n'golá by its native speakers. It is a creole language with a majority Portuguese lexicon and a heavy substrate of a dialect of Kimbundu (port. Quimbundo), a Bantu language from inland Angola, where many had come from prior to being enslaved. It is rather different from Sãotomense, the other creole language spoken on the island.

== Description ==
It is a Portuguese-based creole language different from other Portuguese-based creole languages in Africa. The main difference is the substrate form Kimbundu and Kikongo from Angola.

== History ==
In the middle of the 16th century, a slave ship from Angola sunk before the southern coast of São Tomé. The surviving people aboard settled the coast as free fishermen. Their language was different from other creole language on the island. Today, between 10% and 20% of its linguistic elements are still of African origin.

European Portuguese is mostly spoken in formal situations, in the media, business, education, judicial system and legislature, while Angolar and Sao Tomean Portuguese are preferred for informal situations as a vernacular language in day-to-day life and daily activities, and code switching even occurs between Angolar, standard European Portuguese, and São Tomean Portuguese in informal speech.
