= List of diplomatic missions of São Tomé and Príncipe =

This is a list of diplomatic missions of São Tomé and Príncipe. São Tomé and Príncipe is a Portuguese-speaking island nation in the Gulf of Guinea, Central Africa. It has a very small number of diplomatic missions. This list excludes honorary consulates.

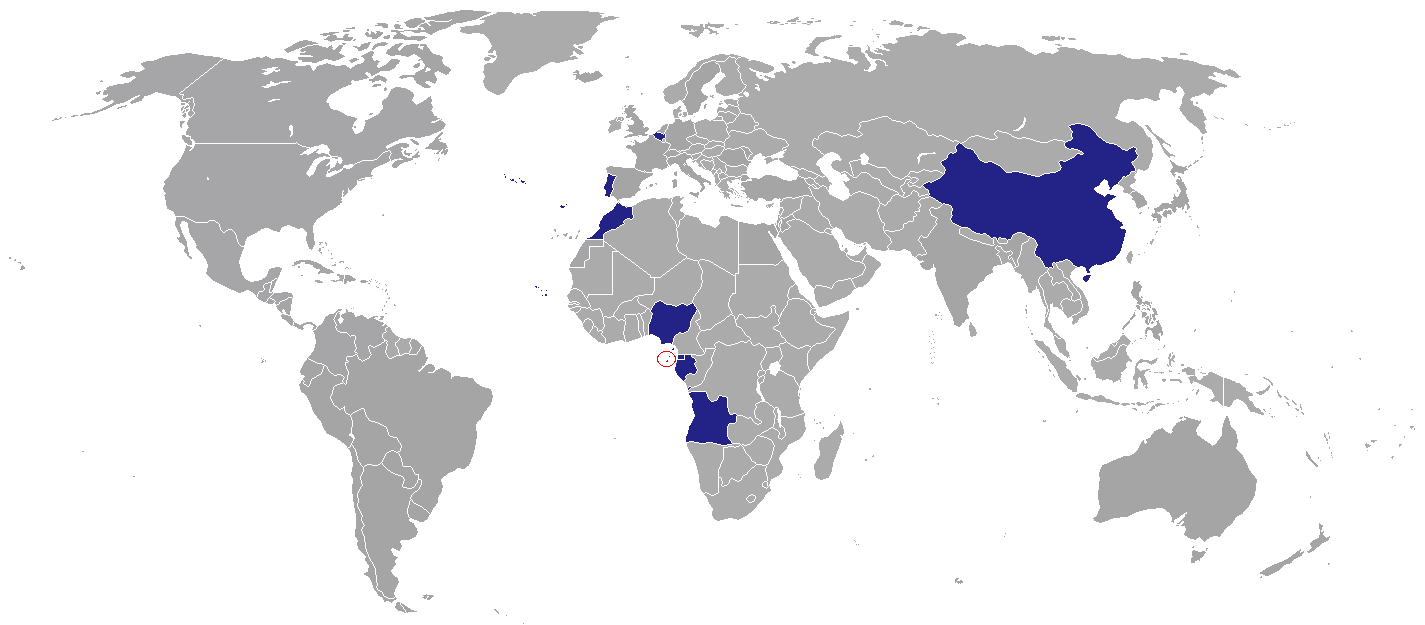
Map of diplomatic missions of São Tomé and Príncipe

== Current missions ==
=== Africa ===
| Host country | Host city | Mission | Concurrent accreditation | Ref. |
|---|---|---|---|---|
| Angola | Luanda | Embassy | Countries: Mozambique | |
| Cape Verde | Praia | Embassy | | |
| Equatorial Guinea | Malabo | Embassy | | |
| Gabon | Libreville | Embassy | | |
| Morocco | Rabat | Embassy | | |
| Morocco | Laayoune | Consulate-General | | |
| Nigeria | Abuja | Embassy | | |

=== Asia ===
| Host country | Host city | Mission | Concurrent accreditation | Ref. |
|---|---|---|---|---|
| China | Beijing | Embassy | | |

=== Europe ===
| Host country | Host city | Mission | Concurrent accreditation | Ref. |
|---|---|---|---|---|
| Belgium | Brussels | Embassy | Countries: Austria; France; Germany; International Organizations: European Union | |
| Portugal | Lisbon | Embassy | Countries: Holy See; International Organizations: Community of Portuguese Language Countries | |

=== Multilateral organizations ===
| Organization | Host city | Host country | Mission | Concurrent accreditation | Ref. |
|---|---|---|---|---|---|
| African Union | Addis Ababa | Ethiopia | Permanent Mission | | |
| United Nations | New York City | United States | Permanent Mission | Countries: Brazil; Canada; Indonesia; United States | |
| United Nations | Geneva | Switzerland | Permanent Mission | Countries: Switzerland | |

== Gallery ==
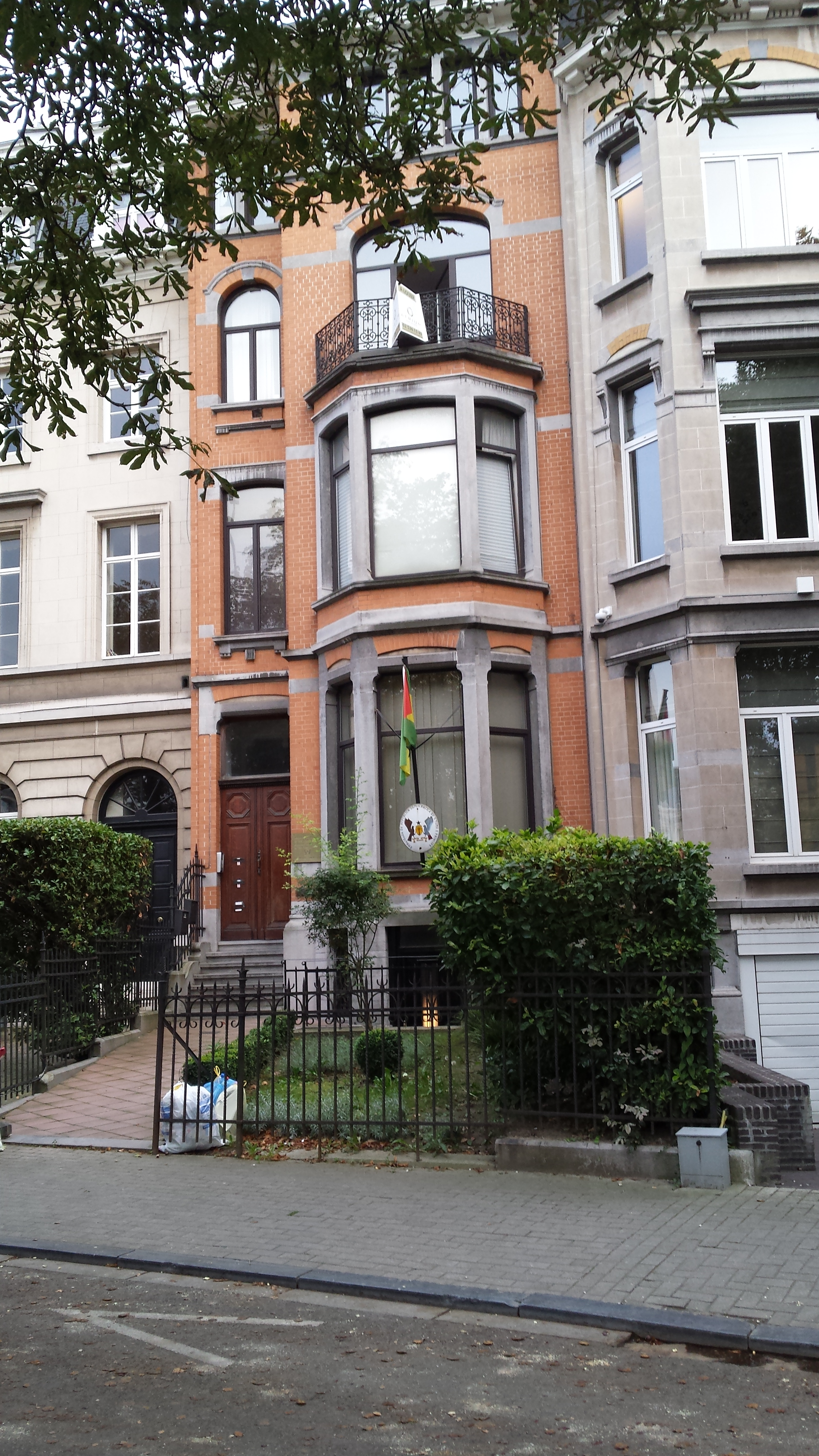
Embassy in Brussels

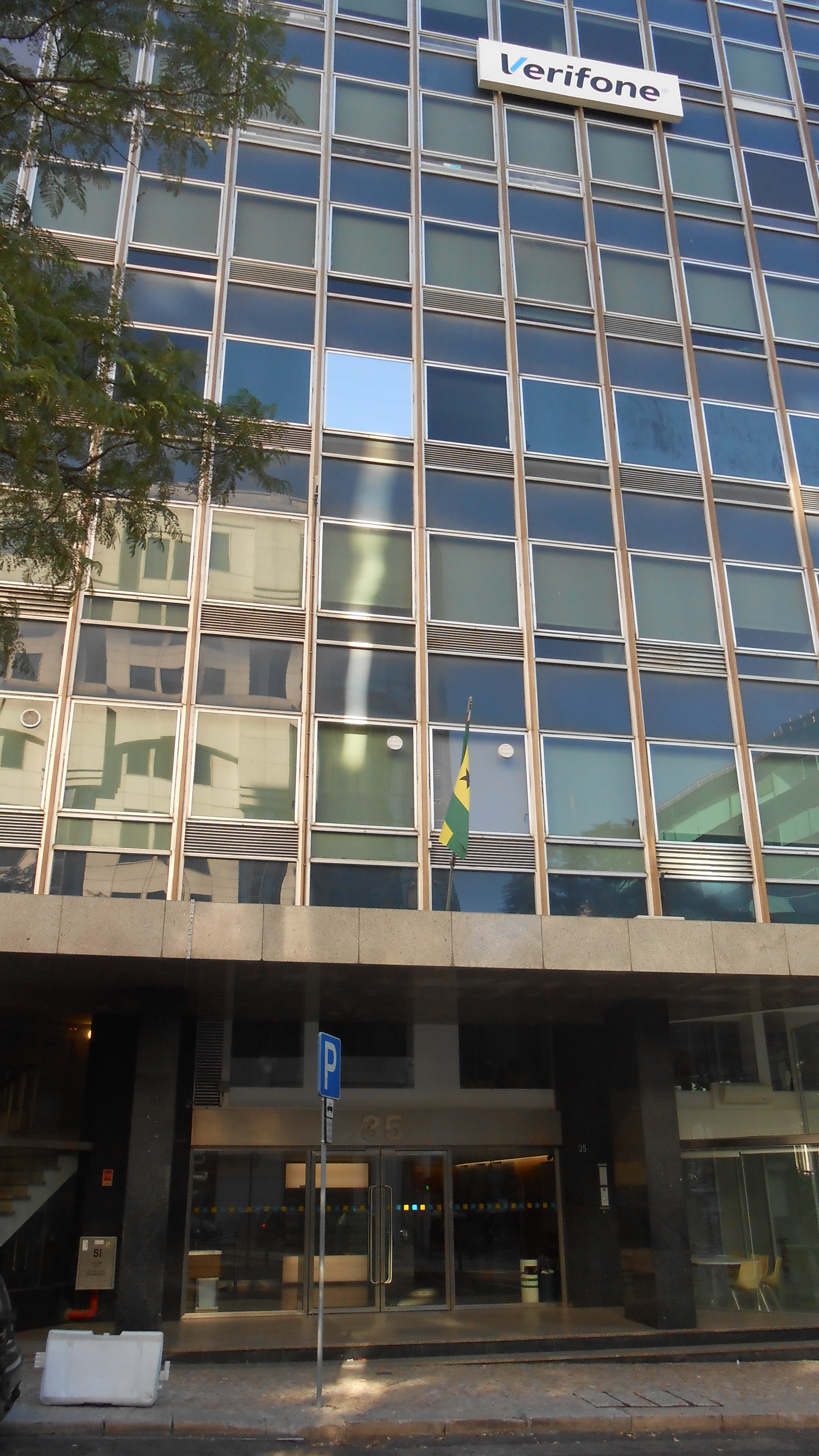
Embassy in Lisbon

== See also ==
- Foreign relations of São Tomé and Príncipe
- List of diplomatic missions in São Tomé and Príncipe
- Visa policy of São Tomé and Príncipe
