= São Tomé and Príncipe–United States relations =

- São Tomé and Príncipe: United States

São Tomé and Príncipe–United States relations are bilateral relations between São Tomé and Príncipe and the United States. Since 2022, the U.S. Ambassador to São Tomé has been based at the embassy in Luanda, Angola. Previously, this role was held on a non-resident basis by the U.S. Ambassador stationed at the embassy in Libreville, Gabon. The Ambassador and Embassy staff make regular visits to the islands. The US State Department has described relations with São Tomé and Príncipe as excellent.

== History ==
São Tomé and Príncipe began developing foreign relations following its independence in 1975. The United States was among the first countries to accredit an ambassador to São Tomé and Príncipe. The first Sao Tomean Ambassador to the United States, resident in New York City, was accredited in 1985. In 1986, Sao Tomean President Manuel Pinto da Costa visited the United States and met with then-Vice President George H. W. Bush.

In 1992, the US federal government broadcaster Voice of America and the government of São Tomé signed a long-term 30-year term agreement for the establishment of a relay transmitter station in São Tomé. Voice of America currently broadcasts to much of Africa from this facility.

In 2001, President Fradique de Menezes accepted $100,000 from the Environmental Remediation Holding Corporation (ERHC), an American oil company involved in offshore exploration, but stated that the money was a legitimate campaign contribution. In 1997, São Tomé and Príncipe and ERHC had signed an agreement for near-exclusive exploration rights in exchange for $5 million.

In August 2002 the BBC reported that São Tomé and Príncipe had agreed to host a US naval base to protect its oil interests. The islands are in a strategic position in the Gulf of Guinea from which the US could monitor the movement of oil tankers and guard oil platforms. Later in 2002, General Carlton W. Fulford, Jr., deputy commander in chief of the United States European Command, visited Sao Tome for planning talks on security.

On July 16, 2003 the government of the 140,000 person state was briefly deposed in an attempted military coup. The US State Department deplored the takeover and urged those involved to release the arrested government officials. The coup leaders handed back power a few days later when the president promised to restore democratic rule.

In July 2005, a U.S. Coast Guard cutter with a crew of 100 visited São Tomé and Príncipe in a public relations exercise. Carlos Neves, vice-president of the national assembly stated: "Unfortunately, Americans are interested in Sao Tome because of oil, but Sao Tome existed before that." Nevertheless, in August 2005, both countries signed an agreement concerning defense cooperation.

In November 2007 the United States and São Tomé and Príncipe signed a Millennium Challenge Corporation Threshold Program agreement worth US$8.66 million, designed to help the country improve its fiscal policy indicators by streamlining business registration processes, tax and customs administration.

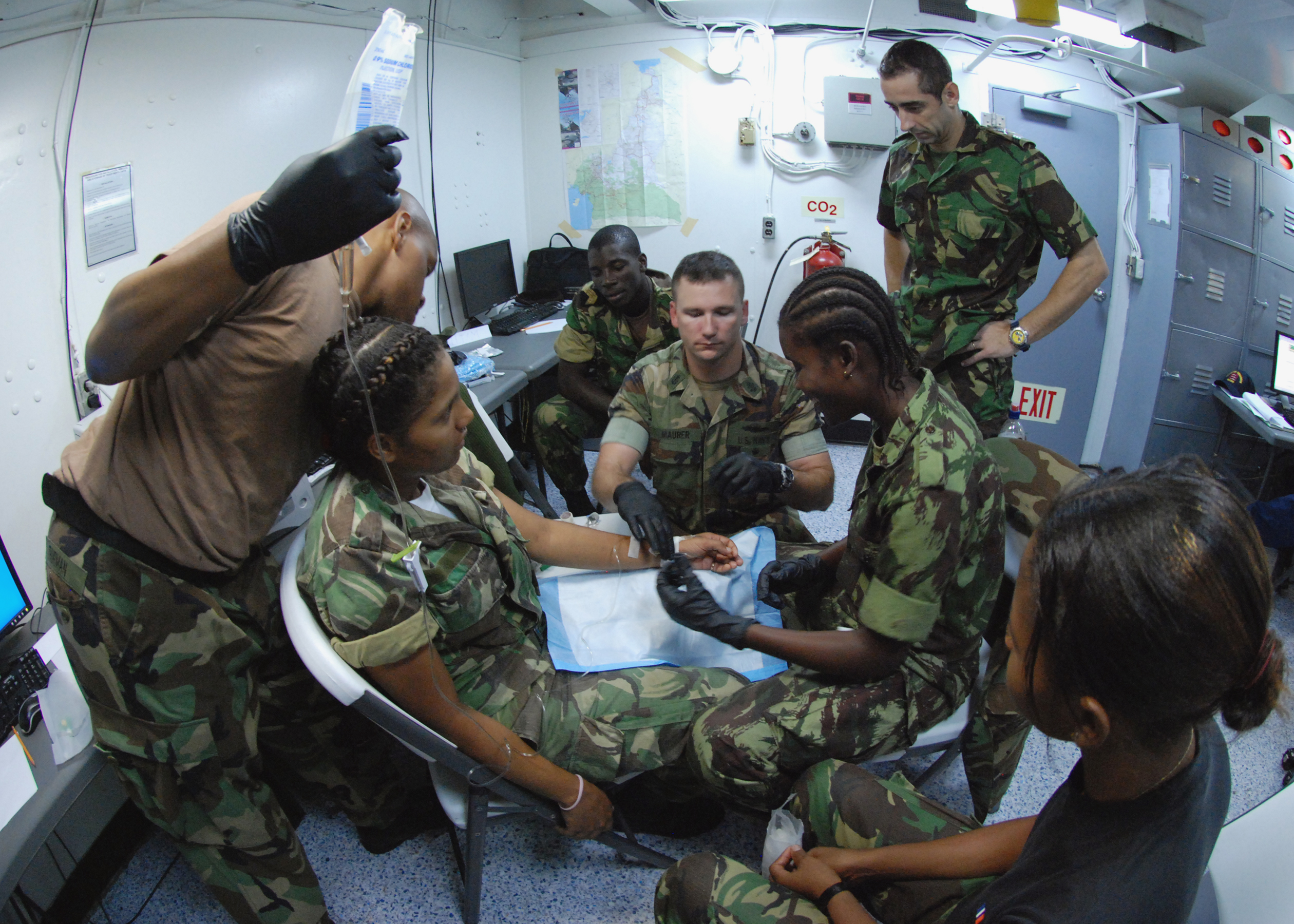
US Naval corpsmen provides medical training to Santomean personnel in January 2008

In 2008, the US Navy visited São Tomé and Princípe as part of the Africa Partnership Station (APS), a US-led multi-national effort to improve maritime safety and security in Africa by bringing the latest training and techniques to maritime professionals in nine West and Central African countries.

After an initial one-year extension in 2022, in May 2023, the agreement between Voice of America and the government of São Tomé was extended for two additional years, ensuring the continuation of operations at the São Tomé relay station. This extension, effective until June 2025, includes annual financial payments of $800,000 by the United States to São Tomé.

The U.S. government also maintains a number of smaller assistance programs in São Tomé, administered through non-governmental organizations or the Embassy in Luanda. According to the U.S. Department of State, foreign assistance to São Tomé and Príncipe is focused on improving the professionalism and capacity of the country’s small military and coast guard and enhancing its maritime security efforts.

== Economic relations ==
Although the two nations do not have a bilateral investment treaty or a taxation agreement, São Tomé and Príncipe is eligible for preferential trade benefits under the African Growth and Opportunity Act (AGOA).

In 2022, the United States had a trade surplus with the São Tomé and Príncipe. This surplus has been consistent over the years, with U.S. exports to São Tomé and Príncipe being much larger than the imports it receives.

The U.S. exported $4.06M to São Tomé and Príncipe, primarily including pharmaceutical products and engine parts. Exports to Sao Tome and Principe have slightly decreased from $4.33M in 2017.

São Tomé and Príncipe exported $871k to the United States, with key products being integrated circuits, washing and bottling machines, and coconut oil. Since 2017 exports to the U.S. have grew from $565k in 2017 although with significant oscilations over the years.

== US ambassadors ==
The current US non-resident ambassador to São Tomé and Príncipe is Tulinabo S. Mushingi.

== See also ==
- Foreign relations of São Tomé and Príncipe
- Foreign relations of the United States
