= Foreign relations of São Tomé and Príncipe =

Until independence in 1975, São Tomé and Príncipe had few ties abroad except those that passed through Portugal. Following independence, the new government sought to expand its diplomatic relationships. A common language, tradition, and colonial legacy have led to close collaboration between São Tomé and other ex-Portuguese colonies in Africa, particularly Angola. São Toméan relations with other African countries in the region, such as Gabon and the Republic of the Congo, are also good. In December 2000, São Tomé signed the African Union treaty; it was later ratified by the National Assembly.

The São Toméan government has generally maintained a foreign policy based on nonalignment and cooperation with any country willing to assist in its economic development. In recent years, it has also increasingly emphasized ties to the United States and western Europe.

== Diplomatic relations ==
List of countries which São Tomé and Príncipe maintains diplomatic relations with:

#	Country	Date
1	China	12 July 1975
2	Germany	12 July 1975
3	Portugal	12 July 1975
4	Romania	12 July 1975
5	Cameroon	14 July 1975
6	Japan	22 July 1975
7	France	28 July 1975
8	North Korea	9 August 1975
9	Russia	9 August 1975
10	United States	10 October 1975
11	Czech Republic	22 October 1975
12	Mongolia	22 October 1975
13	Argentina	5 November 1975
14	Nigeria	30 December 1975
15	Brazil	31 December 1975
16	Gabon	1975
17	India	1975
18	Egypt	March 1976
19	Cuba	10 April 1976
20	Hungary	2 November 1976
21	Vietnam	6 November 1976
22	Libya	March 1977
23	Sweden	1977
24	Angola	19 February 1978
25	Senegal	April 1978
26	Poland	20 November 1978
27	Canada	13 December 1978
28	Morocco	1978
29	Algeria	7 January 1979
30	Serbia	2 February 1979
31	Finland	1 March 1979
32	Albania	20 November 1979
33	Grenada	23 November 1979
34	United Kingdom	3 December 1979
35	Bulgaria	25 December 1979
36	Kuwait	9 January 1980
37	Jamaica	29 February 1980
38	Netherlands	20 May 1980
39	Equatorial Guinea	1981
40	Mozambique	1981
41	Turkey	1981
42	Spain	26 February 1982
—	Holy See	21 December 1984
43	Switzerland	28 February 1985
44	Iran	November 1985
45	Greece	24 April 1986
46	Seychelles	22 October 1986
47	Belgium	1986
48	Tunisia	1986
49	Thailand	7 May 1987
50	Bolivia	15 May 1987
51	Zambia	31 August 1987
52	Colombia	12 August 1988
53	South Korea	20 August 1988
54	Italy	24 December 1988
55	Peru	4 May 1989
56	Chile	5 May 1989
—	State of Palestine	1989
57	Mexico	10 September 1990
58	Uruguay	26 September 1990
59	Slovakia	2 April 1993
60	Austria	3 May 1993
61	Croatia	23 May 1993
62	Israel	16 November 1993
63	South Africa	10 May 1994
64	Latvia	26 July 1994
65	Singapore	18 August 1997
66	Oman	15 September 1997
67	United Arab Emirates	24 October 1997
68	Bahrain	27 October 1997
—	Sovereign Military Order of Malta	1997
69	Ukraine	16 April 1998
70	North Macedonia	11 July 2000
71	Cyprus	7 November 2000
72	Philippines	8 November 2000
73	Bosnia and Herzegovina	8 May 2001
74	Belarus	11 December 2001
75	Timor-Leste	20 May 2002
76	Mauritius	28 February 2003
77	Lithuania	8 July 2003
78	Norway	6 August 2004
79	Venezuela	19 August 2006
80	Iceland	24 September 2007
81	Cape Verde	10 November 2008
82	Estonia	20 May 2009
83	Andorra	27 May 2009
84	Australia	8 July 2009
85	Indonesia	27 September 2011
86	Mauritania	4 August 2013
87	Luxembourg	10 April 2014
88	Slovenia	10 April 2014
89	Georgia	12 September 2014
90	Kazakhstan	20 November 2014
91	Malaysia	9 April 2015
92	Rwanda	11 January 2017
93	Sudan	20 April 2018
94	Namibia	14 September 2018
95	Dominican Republic	24 September 2018
96	Malta	24 September 2018
97	Tajikistan	24 September 2018
98	Azerbaijan	25 September 2018
99	Saint Kitts and Nevis	28 September 2018
100	Burkina Faso	20 February 2019
101	Benin	20 February 2019
102	Denmark	20 February 2019
103	Qatar	4 May 2021
104	Chad	3 March 2022
105	Ivory Coast	3 March 2022
106	Maldives	5 April 2022
107	Zimbabwe	15 June 2022
108	Saudi Arabia	7 June 2023
109	Burundi	13 June 2023
110	Ghana	13 June 2023
111	Paraguay	13 July 2023
112	Mali	8 December 2023
113	Dominica	23 September 2025
114	Kyrgyzstan	26 September 2025
115	San Marino	26 September 2025
116	Turkmenistan	11 December 2025
117	Republic of the Congo	Unknown
118	Guinea-Bissau	Unknown
119	Nicaragua	Unknown
120	Pakistan	Unknown

== Bilateral relations ==
Country	Formal relations began	Notes
Angola	19 February 1978	Both countries established diplomatic relations on 19 February 1978: Angola has an embassy in São Tomé.; São Tomé and Príncipe has an embassy in Luanda.
Australia	8 July 2009	Both countries established diplomatic relations on 8 July 2009: Australia is represented in São Tomé and Príncipe from its embassy in Lisbon, Portugal.; São Tomé and Príncipe is represented in Australia from its embassy in Lisbon, Portugal.
Brazil	12 July 1975	See Brazil–São Tomé and Príncipe relations Both countries established diplomatic relations in 1975. Both countries are full members of the Community of Portuguese Language Countries.: Brazil has an embassy in São Tomé.; São Tomé and Príncipe is accredited to Brazil from its Permanent Mission to the United Nations in New York City, United States.
Cape Verde	10 November 2008	Cape Verde has an embassy in São Tomé.; São Tomé and Príncipe maintains an embassy in Praia.
China	12 July 1975, severed diplomatic relations 6 May 1997, Restored 26 December 2016	See China–São Tomé and Príncipe relations Prior to independence, the People's Republic of China (PRC) supported the country's indigenous movement for independence against the Portuguese Empire and the relationship continued after independence. Official diplomatic relation was established with the PRC upon independence on 12 July 1975. In 1975 and 1983, the country's first president, Manuel Pinto da Costa, visited the PRC. On 6 May 1997, São Tomé and Príncipe switched diplomatic relation from PRC to Republic of China (ROC). On 15 November 2013, an unofficial PRC trade mission office was established in São Tomé and Príncipe to facilitate the non-political commercial ties with the PRC. However, in June 2014, President Manuel Pinto da Costa made a private visit to Shanghai in Mainland China for a non-political mission. São Tomé and Príncipe had been speaking at the United Nations General Assembly for ROC meaningful participation in international organizations. While on the other side, ROC has provided various aids to the country for the development in their infrastructure and social system. São Tomé and Príncipe severed relations with ROC on 20 December 2016, leaving Burkina Faso and Swaziland as the only two remaining African nations retaining formal relations with the ROC, when the ROC government reportedly turned down a São Toméan request for $210 million in financial assistance. Diplomatic relations between PRC and São Tomé and Príncipe resumed on 26 December 2016.
Egypt	March 1976	Egypt is represented in São Tomé and Príncipe by its embassy in Luanda, Angola.; Both countries are full members of the African Union.
Gabon	1975	Gabon has an embassy in São Tomé.; São Tomé and Príncipe has an embassy in Libreville.
India	14 August 1975	See India–São Tomé and Príncipe relations: India has an embassy in São Tomé.; São Tomé and Príncipe has an honorary consulate in New Delhi.
Mozambique	1981	Mozambique is accredited to São Tomé and Príncipe from its embassy in Luanda, Angola and maintains an honorary consulate in São Tomé.; São Tomé and Príncipe is accredited to Mozambique from its embassy in Luanda, Angola and maintains an honorary consulate in Maputo.
Portugal	12 July 1975	See Portugal–São Tomé and Príncipe relations Both countries established diplomatic relations on 12 July 1975.: Portugal has an embassy in São Tomé.; São Tomé and Príncipe has an embassy in Lisbon.
Serbia	2 February 1979	Both countries established diplomatic relations on 2 February 1979; Both countries have a number of bilateral agreements.
South Korea	20 August 1988	Establishment of diplomatic relations between the Republic of Korea and São Tomé and Príncipe was August 20, 1988. In 2001 Bilateral Trade were Exports $74,479 Imports $40,381.
Turkey	12 July 1975	Embassy of São Tomé and Príncipe in Lisbon is accredited to Turkey.; The Turkish Embassy in Libreville is accredited to São Tomé and Príncipe.; Trade volume between the two countries was 2.3 million USD in 2019.
United States	12 July 1975	See São Tomé and Príncipe–United States relations With the development of São Tomé's oil reserves, American diplomatic and military relations are becoming closer. In February 2005, the US Navy's USS Emory S. Land (AS-39) entered West African waters near São Tomé to provide security assistance and training to the local security services.: São Tomé and Príncipe is accredited to the United States from its Permanent Mission to the United Nations in New York City.; United States is accredited to São Tomé and Príncipe from its embassy in Luanda, Angola.

== See also ==
- List of diplomatic missions in São Tomé and Príncipe
- List of diplomatic missions of São Tomé and Príncipe
