= List of diplomatic missions in São Tomé and Príncipe =

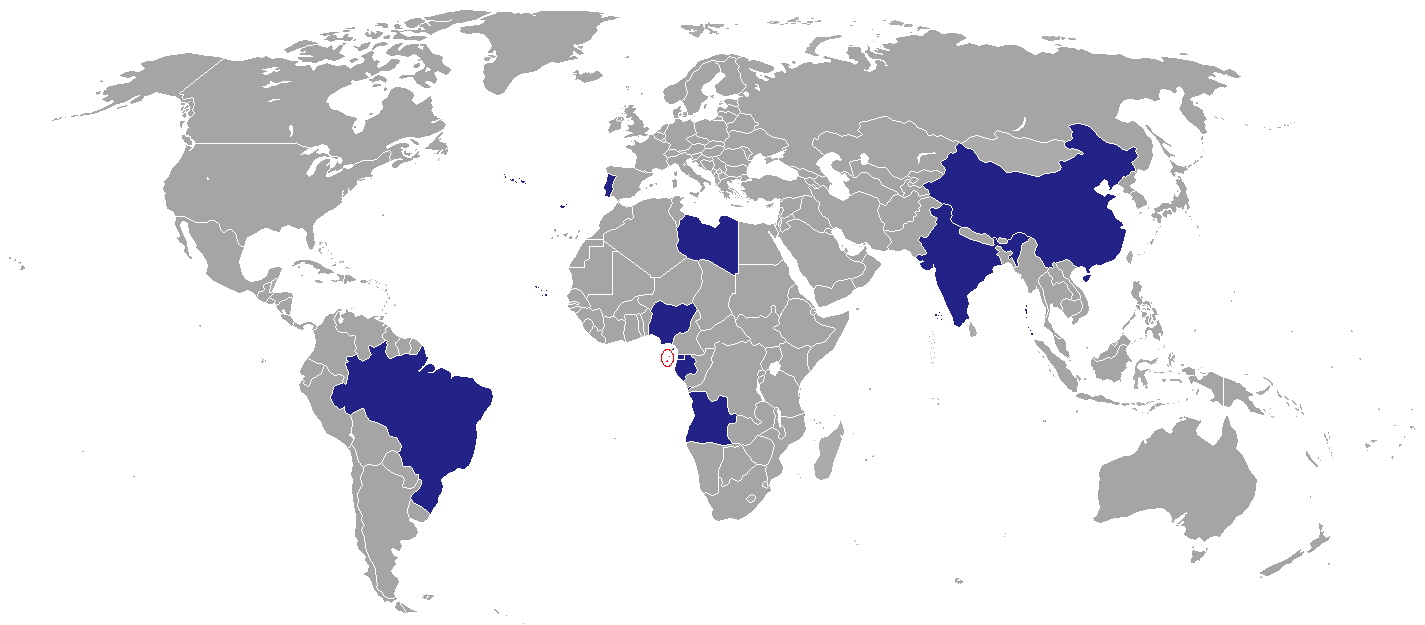
Map of diplomatic missions in São Tomé and Príncipe

This is a list of diplomatic missions in São Tomé and Príncipe. At present, the capital city of São Tomé hosts ten embassies. Several other countries accredit ambassadors from other capitals.

== Embassies in São Tomé ==
1. Angola
2. Brazil
3. China
4. Cape Verde
5. Equatorial Guinea
6. Gabon
7. India
8. Libya
9. Nigeria
10. Portugal

== Non-resident embassies ==
Resident in Abuja, Nigeria

- Argentina
- Austria
- Bangladesh
- Benin
- Guinea
- Indonesia
- Iran
- Ireland
- Kenya
- Liberia
- Pakistan
- Sierra Leone
- Slovakia
- Sahrawi Republic
- Thailand
- Togo
- Uganda

Resident in Libreville, Gabon

- Cameroon
- Cuba
- European Union
- France
- Germany
- Japan
- Kuwait
- Lebanon
- Mali
- Saudi Arabia
- South Korea
- Spain
- Turkey
- Tunisia
- United States

Resident in Lisbon, Portugal

- Australia
- Chile
- Croatia
- Colombia
- Denmark
- Georgia
- Philippines
- Greece
- Sweden

Resident in Luanda, Angola

- Algeria
- Belgium
- Israel
- Italy
- Mauritania
- Mozambique
- Netherlands
- Namibia
- Norway
- Palestine
- Poland
- Romania
- Russia
- United Arab Emirates
- United Kingdom
- Venezuela
- Vietnam
- Zimbabwe
- Zambia

Resident in Paris, France

- Afghanistan
- Laos
- Turkmenistan
- Tajikistan

Resident in other cities

- Central African Republic (Yaoundé)
- Canada (Yaoundé)
- Czech Republic (Pretoria)
- Dominica (London)
- Haiti (Pretoria)
- Honduras (Pretoria)
- Ivory Coast (Yaoundé)
- Jordan (Nairobi)
- Kyrgyzstan (London)
- Maldives (London)
- Mexico (New York City)
- Malaysia (Accra)
- Oman (Nairobi)
- Serbia (New York City)
- Seychelles (Addis Ababa)
- Switzerland (Kinshasa)
- Tanzania (Windhoek)
- Yemen (Addis Ababa)

== Former Embassies ==
South Africa (São Tomé) (Embassy)

== See also ==
- Foreign relations of São Tomé and Príncipe
- List of diplomatic missions of São Tomé and Príncipe
- Visa policy of São Tomé and Príncipe
