= China–São Tomé and Príncipe relations =

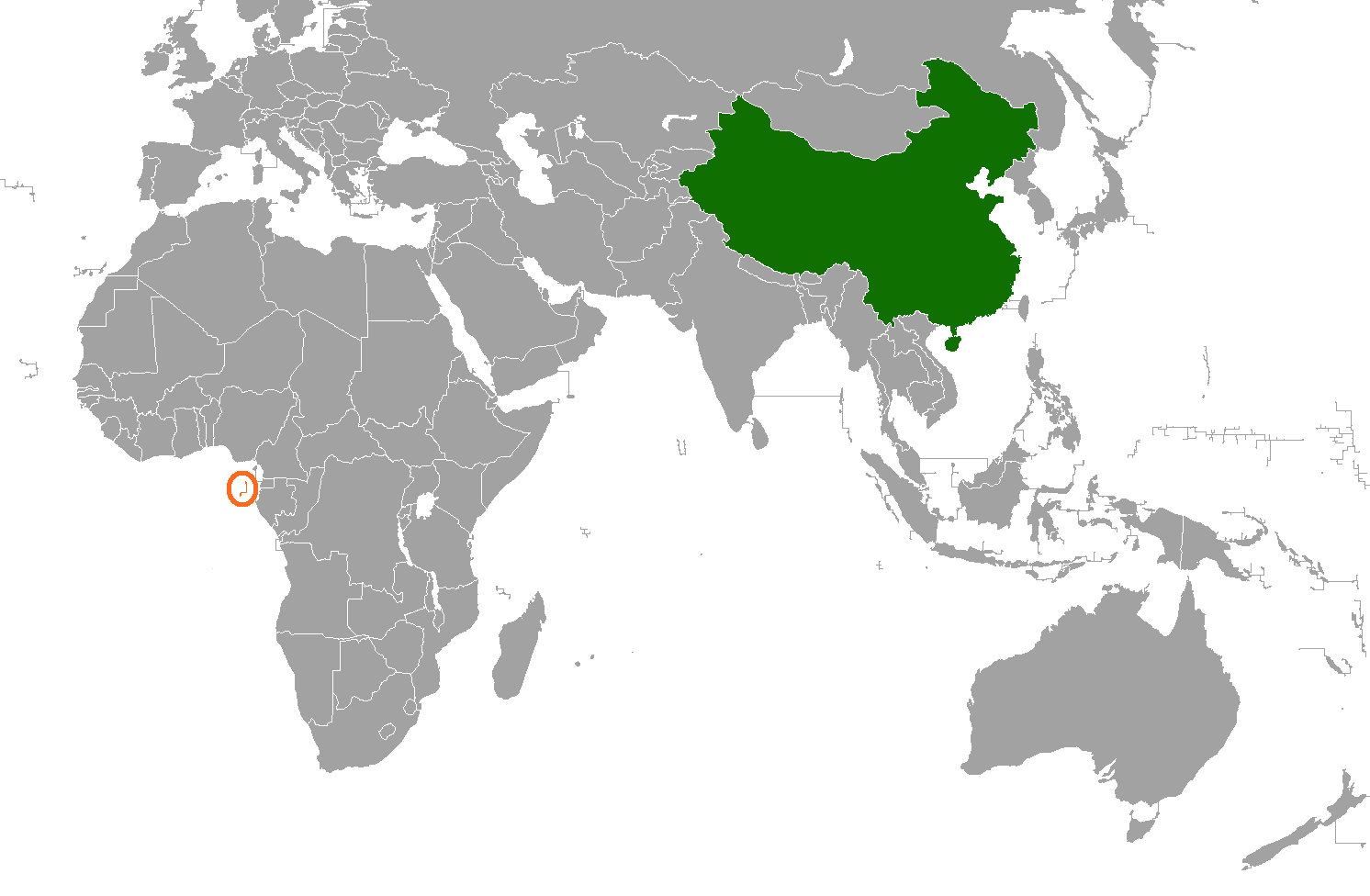

- China: São Tomé and Príncipe

The People's Republic of China (PRC) and São Tomé and Príncipe are both members of the United Nations.

== History ==
On June 12, 1975, São Tomé and Príncipe and the PRC established diplomatic relations.

In 1985, China financed and built a People's Palace in São Tomé and Príncipe.

In 1997, São Tomé and Príncipe established diplomatic relations with the Republic of China, prompting the PRC to suspend relations. However, in 2013, the People's Republic of China established a trade office in São Tomé and Príncipe, and the next year President Manuel Pinto da Costa visited China in a private capacity.

David H. Shinn and academic Joshua Eisenman write that São Tomé and Príncipe's presence at the 2006 Forum Macao meeting as an unofficial observer may have begun the process of São Tomé and Príncipe switching its diplomatic recognition from the Republic of China (Taiwan) to the People's Republic of China. It participated as an official observer for the first time in 2013.

Bilateral relations between São Tomé and Príncipe and Taiwan were terminated on 21 December 2016. São Tomé and Príncipe recognized the PRC on December 26, 2016. A Chinese embassy was opened in the capital in April 2017. Beijing moved swiftly to provide substantial aid to the archipelago previously provided by Taiwan. In January 2017, the two nations signed a 5-year co‑operation agreement prioritizing areas including tourism, infrastructure, technology, agriculture and fisheries, student scholarships and medical assistance. The Economist reports that Chinese leader "Xi Jinping declared that China was ready to expand co‑operation to maritime security to combat piracy and transnational organised crime." Sao Tome leader Trovoada confirmed that Chinese aid would include grants, direct budget support and a cancellation of US$17.3 million in bilateral debt.

On April 25, 2017, Mr Trovoada disclosed that China would also provide São Tomé with a grant of US$146m for infrastructure projects such as the modernisation of São Tomé International Airport and the construction of a deep‑sea container port, which could serve as a logistic hub for Chinese exports to Central Africa.

In February 2020, China's commitment to infrastructure development in São Tomé and Príncipe reached new heights as they promised to fund the expansion of São Tomé and Príncipe's international airport. The project is estimated to cost roughly US$31 million.

São Tomé and Príncipe joined the Belt and Road Initiative (BRI) in 2021.

== Sovereignty issues ==
São Tomé and Príncipe follows the one China principle. It recognizes the People's Republic of China as the sole government of China and Taiwan as an integral part of China's territory, and supports all efforts by the PRC to "achieve national reunification". It also considers Hong Kong, Xinjiang and Tibet to be China's internal affairs.

== See also ==
- São Tomé and Príncipe–Taiwan relations
- Belt and Road Initiative
- Politics of São Tomé and Príncipe
