= Portugal–São Tomé and Príncipe relations =

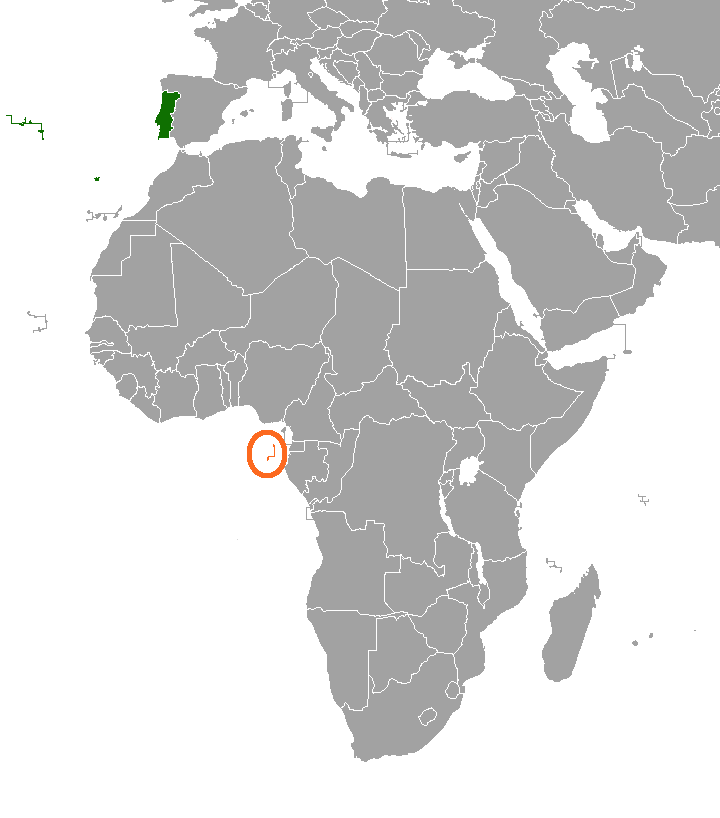

- Portugal: São Tomé and Príncipe

Portugal–São Tomé and Príncipe relations refers to the diplomatic relations between the Portuguese Republic and São Tomé and Príncipe. Both nations are members of the Community of Portuguese Language Countries and the United Nations.

== History ==
In 1470, Portuguese explorers, João de Santarém and Pêro Escobar discovered the islands uninhabited. The territory was soon incorporated into the Portuguese Empire. In order to cultivate the islands, the Portuguese brought people as slaves from the African mainland to work the cocoa and sugar plantations on the islands. São Tomé and Príncipe became important staging post for the Atlantic slave trade.

In 1972, a São Toméan nationalist political party, the Movement for the Liberation of São Tomé and Príncipe (MLSTP), was created by exiles based in Equatorial Guinea with the intent of creating an independent nation. After the Carnation Revolution of 1974, the new Portuguese regime was committed to the dissolution of its overseas colonies. In November 1974, their representatives met with members of the MLSTP in Algiers and worked out an agreement for the transfer of sovereignty. Portugal granted independence to São Tomé and Príncipe on 12 July 1975. That same day, both nations established diplomatic relations.

Since independence, relations between Portugal and São Tomé and Príncipe have remained strong. There are many cultural similarities between both nations. There have also been several high-level visits between leaders of both nations and both countries work closely together within the Community of Portuguese Language Countries.

== Bilateral agreements ==
Both nations have signed a few bilateral agreements such as an Agreement for Cooperation and Friendship (1975); Agreement on Trade (1978); Agreement on Cultural Cooperation (1978); Agreement on Maritime Transport (1978); Agreement on Migration (1978); and an Agreement on Technical Cooperation in Police Training (1989). In September 2022, Portugal and São Tomé and Príncipe signed a new cooperation agreement for defence, bolstering training and maritime security.

== Transportation ==
There are direct flights between both nations with STP Airways and TAP Air Portugal.

== Resident diplomatic missions ==
- Portugal has an embassy in São Tomé.
- São Tomé and Príncipe has an embassy in Lisbon.
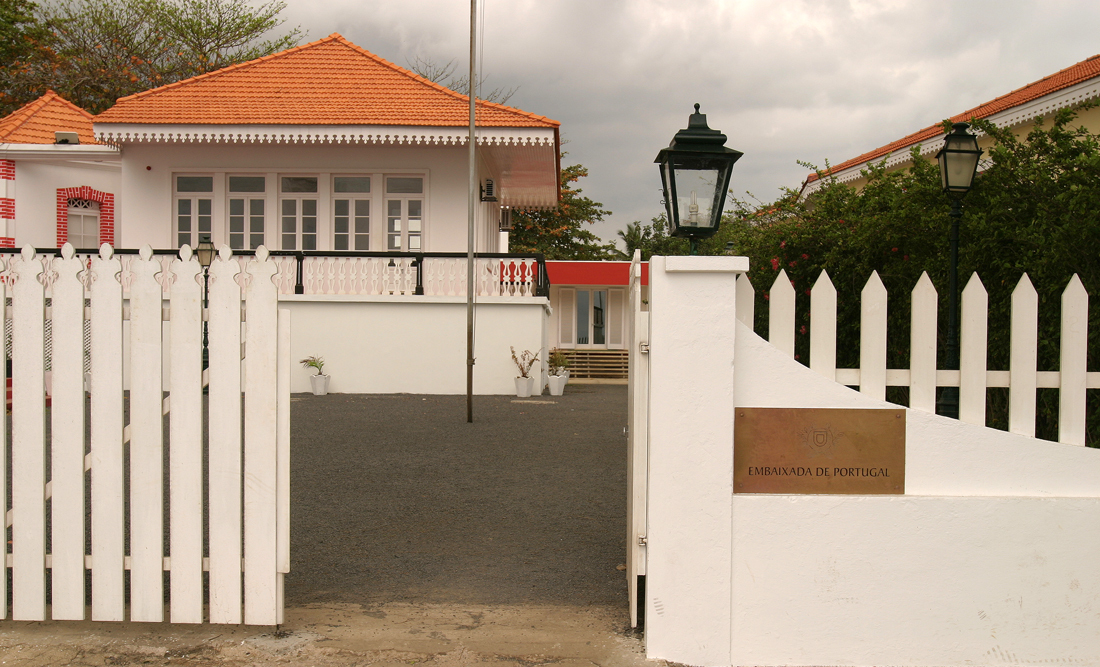
Embassy of Portugal in São Tomé

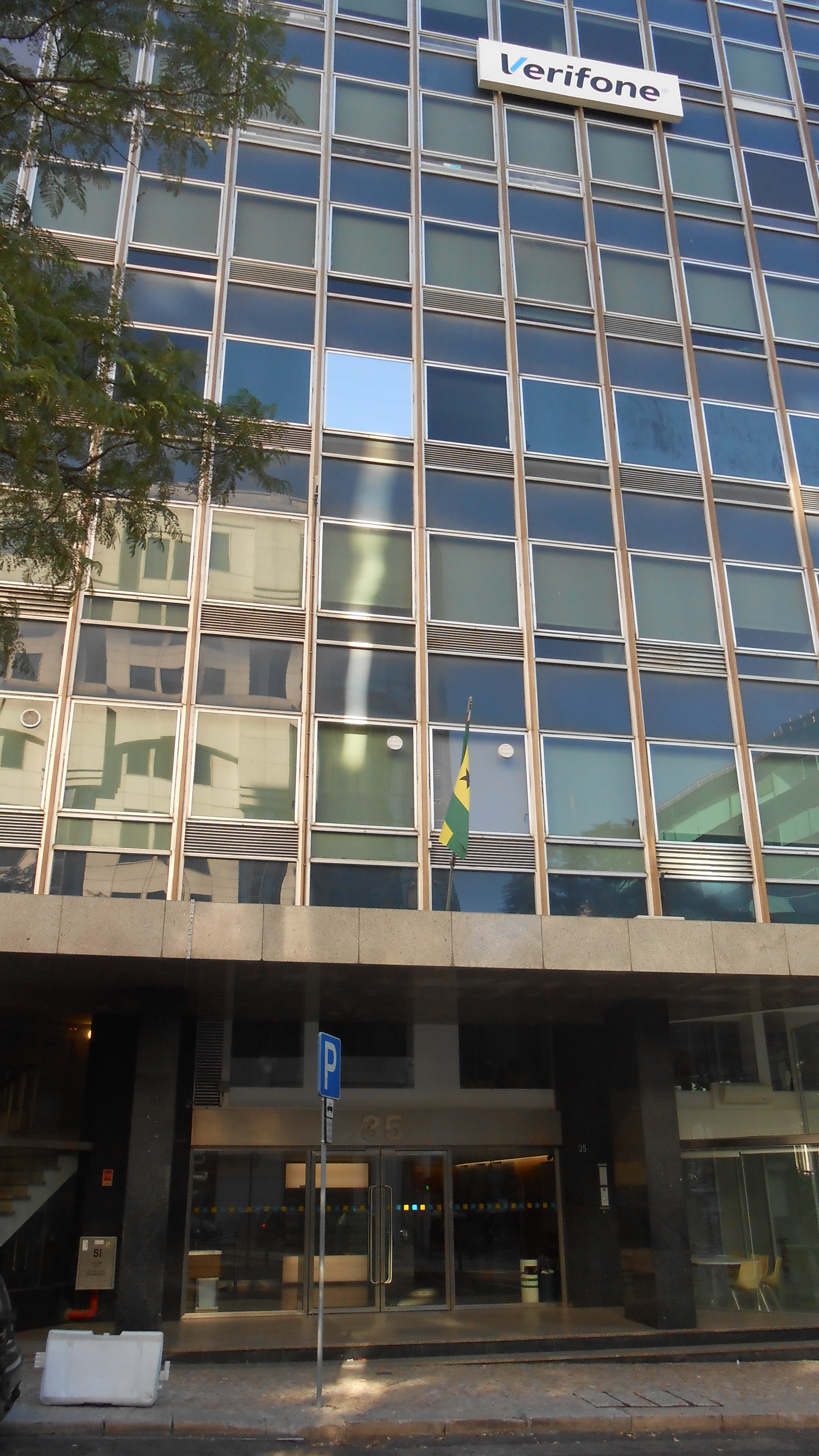
Embassy of São Tomé and Príncipe in Lisbon

== See also ==
- Foreign relations of Portugal
- Foreign relations of São Tomé and Príncipe
- Portuguese Africans
- Portuguese language in Africa
