= Santomean passport =

Passport issued to citizens of São Tomé and Príncipe

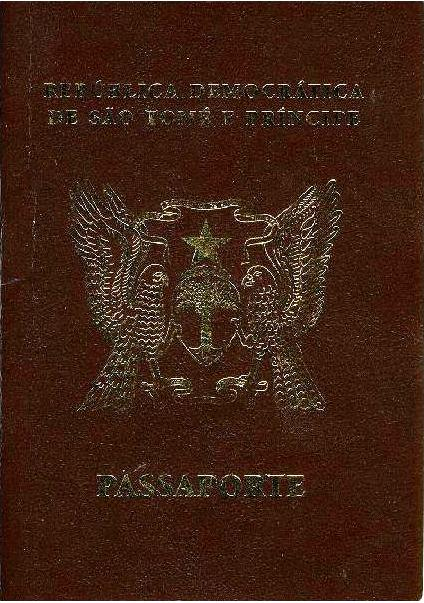
- The front cover of Santomean Passport
- Type: Passport
- Issued by: São Tomé and Príncipe
- Purpose: Identification
- Eligibility: São Toméan citizenship

The Santomean passport is issued to citizens of São Tomé and Príncipe for international travel. As of October 2024, Santomean citizens had visa-free or visa on arrival access to 63 countries and territories, ranking the Santomean passport 78th in terms of travel freedom (tied with Burkinabé passport) according to the Henley Passport Index.

== See also ==
- Visa requirements for Santomean citizens
- List of passports
