= India–São Tomé and Príncipe relations =

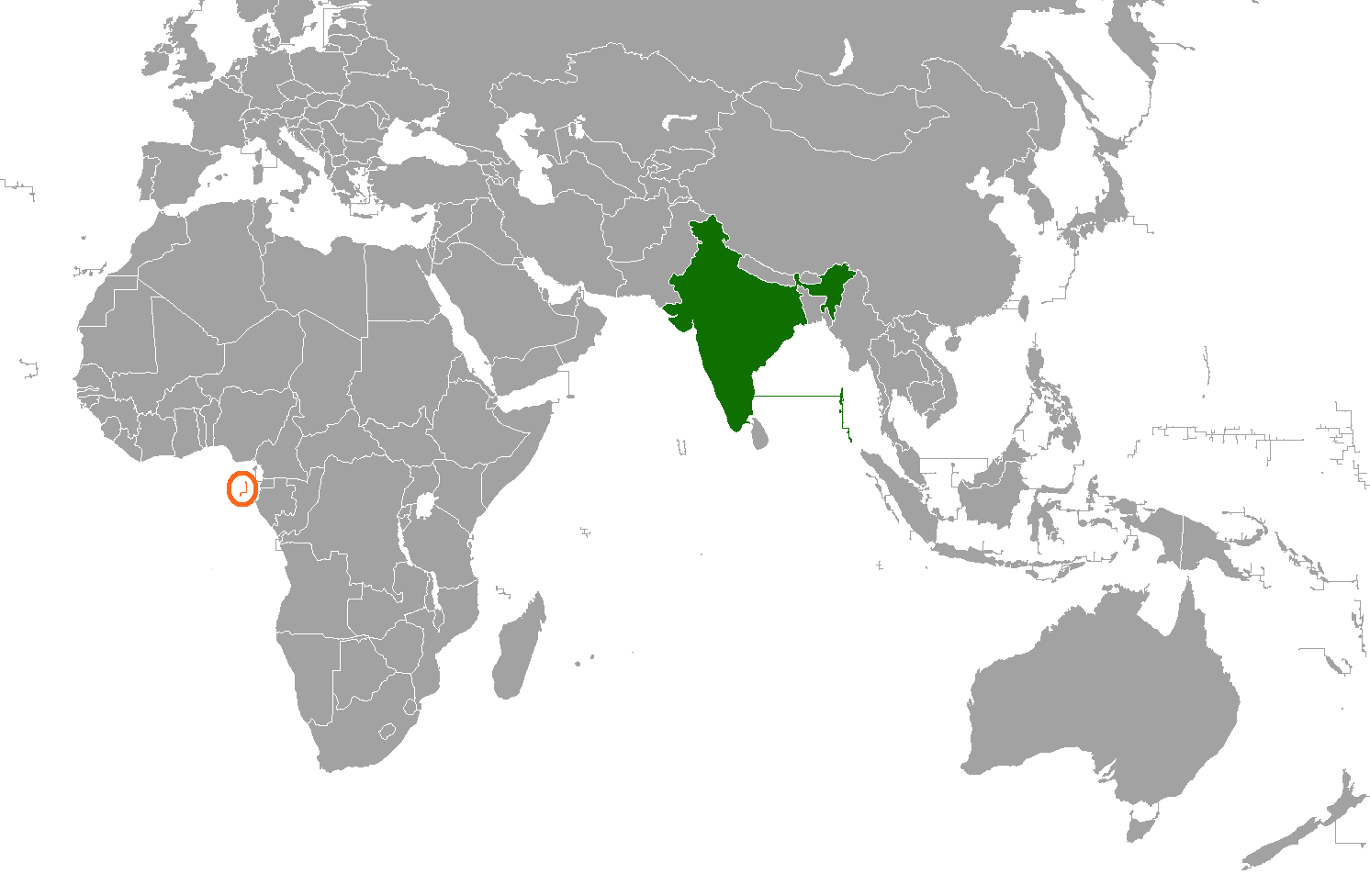

- India: São Tomé and Príncipe

India–São Tomé and Príncipe relations refers to the international relations that exist between India and São Tomé and Príncipe (STP). India has an embassy in São Tomé. STP maintains an Honorary Consul in New Delhi.

== History ==
Relations between India and São Tomé and Príncipe have traditionally been friendly, particularly after the independence of the latter in 1975. The first high-level visit between the two countries took place from 29 November to 2 December 2009, when São Toméan Minister of Foreign Affairs, Cooperation & Communities Carlos Alberto Pires Tiny visited India. Tiny held talks with Indian Minister of State for External Affairs Shashi Tharoor and the two sides signed a Protocol on Foreign Office Consultations to facilitate regular interactions on bilateral, regional and international issues between senior officials of the two Foreign Ministries. India also pledged to provide official developmental assistance, technical cooperation, capacity building, and the economic and social development of the STP and announced numerous grants and lines of credit for the country. Expressing praise for India's "pioneering role" in promoting South-South Cooperation and significant contributions to international peace-keeping, the STP announced its support for India's candidature for a permanent seat in the UN Security Council. Tiny also met with senior officials of the Ministry of Petroleum and ONGC Videsh Limited and discussed bilateral cooperation in the hydrocarbons sector. He also visited the Indian PSUs, the National Small Industries Corporation Limited (NSIC) and the Telecommunications Consultants India Limited (TCIL). Tiny also made a presentation on investment opportunities in STP at a special interactive session organized by the Confederation of Indian Industry in his honour.

The High Commission of India in Lagos, Nigeria was accredited to STP until September 2008, when it was transferred to the Embassy of India in Luanda, Angola. STP voted for India's candidature for a Non-Permanent Seat on the UN Security Council for the year 2011–12.

São Toméan Prime Minister Patrice Trovoada led a delegation which included the Foreign Minister and other senior officials to attend the third India Africa Forum Summit in New Delhi 26 October 2015. This was the first visit by a São Toméan Prime Minister to India. Trovoada held bilateral discussions with Prime Minister Narendra Modi on 28 October.

== Trade ==
Bilateral trade between India and São Tomé and Príncipe totaled US$1.52 million in 2014–15. India exported $1.47 million worth of goods to STP and imported $500,000. Trade declined to $930,000 in 2015–16; India made no imports from STP in that period. The main commodities exported by India to STP are pharmaceuticals, organic chemicals, cotton, and optical, photographic, and medical instruments. São Toméan importers have stated that they would like to import more merchandise from India, but are discouraged by the long shipping time and the high costs involved.

Indian firm ONGC Videsh Limited owns a 13.5% stake in Bloc 2 of the Joint Development Zone (JDZ) through its wholly owned Nigerian subsidiary ONGC Narmada Ltd. Aban Engineering carried out drilling in Bloc 4 of the JDZ.

== Cultural relations ==
São Tomé and Príncipe issued a limited edition collectors' stamp to commemorate the Hindu festivals of Navratri and Durga Puja on 15 October 2015. The stamp depicts Hindu goddess Durga sitting atop a tiger and includes special features such as a velvet effect and Swarovski crystals. Only 1,500 copies of the stamp were issued, and each has a face value of 86,000 dobra (US$ 3998.14).

A small Indian community lived in São Tomé and Príncipe while the country was a Portuguese colony. The community moved to other countries following the Indian annexation of Goa and fall of Portuguese India in 1961. Today, there are a few Indians working in the food sector in STP. Indian traders based in neighbouring African nations often visit STP to conduct trade.

== Foreign aid ==
During Foreign Minister Tiny's visit to India in 2009, the Indian government provided a grant of $1 million to establish a Technology Incubation-cum-Production Centre for the development of the SME sector in STP, and a grant of ₹10 million for the education and health sectors. India also agreed to extend a line of credit of $5 million for agriculture, capacity building and infrastructure projects. India donated computer hardware and 173 packets of essential medicines to the Government of STP in October 2010.

In late 2009, STP became the 47th country to sign up for the Pan-African E-Network Project announced by India at the first India Africa Forum Summit in 2008. As of January 2016, the project is under implementation in the country with Indian assistance.

Citizens of São Tomé and Príncipe are eligible for scholarships under the Indian Technical and Economic Cooperation Programme. São Toméan diplomats have attended the Professional Course for Foreign Diplomats (PCFD) organised by the Foreign Service Institute of the Ministry of External Affairs.

== See also ==
- Foreign relations of India
- Foreign relations of São Tomé and Príncipe
