= São Tomé and Príncipe–Taiwan relations =

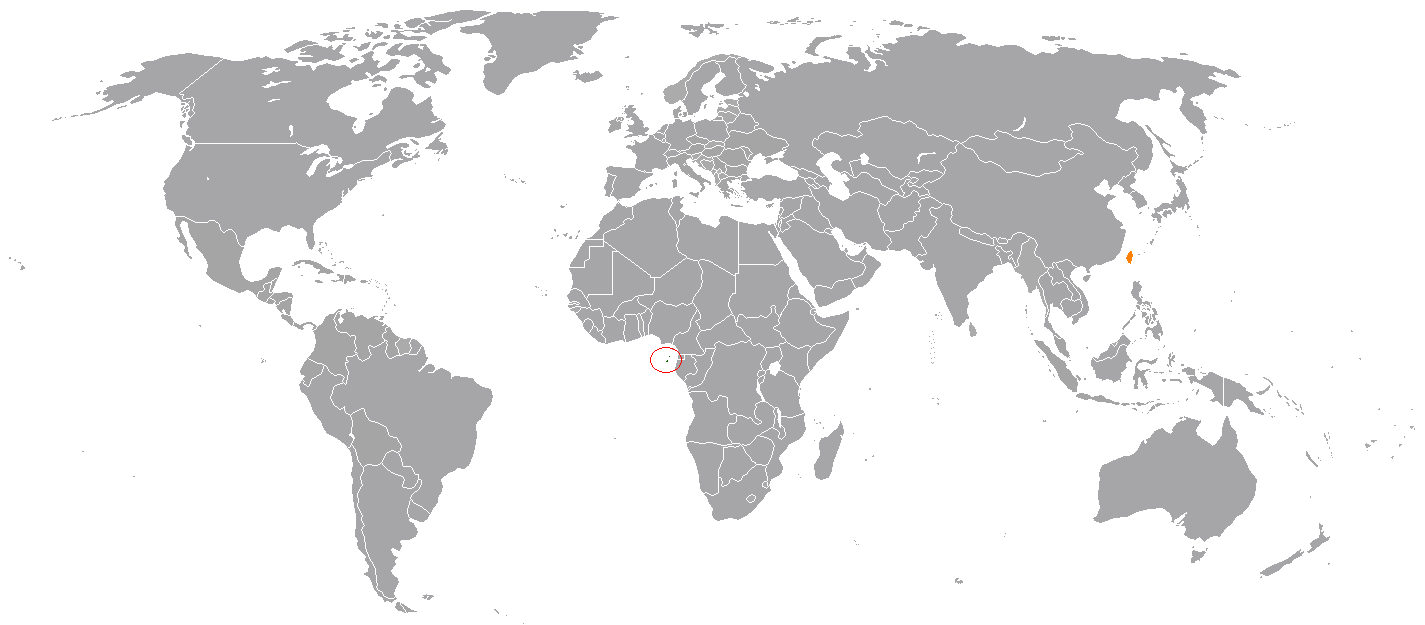

- São Tomé and Príncipe: Taiwan

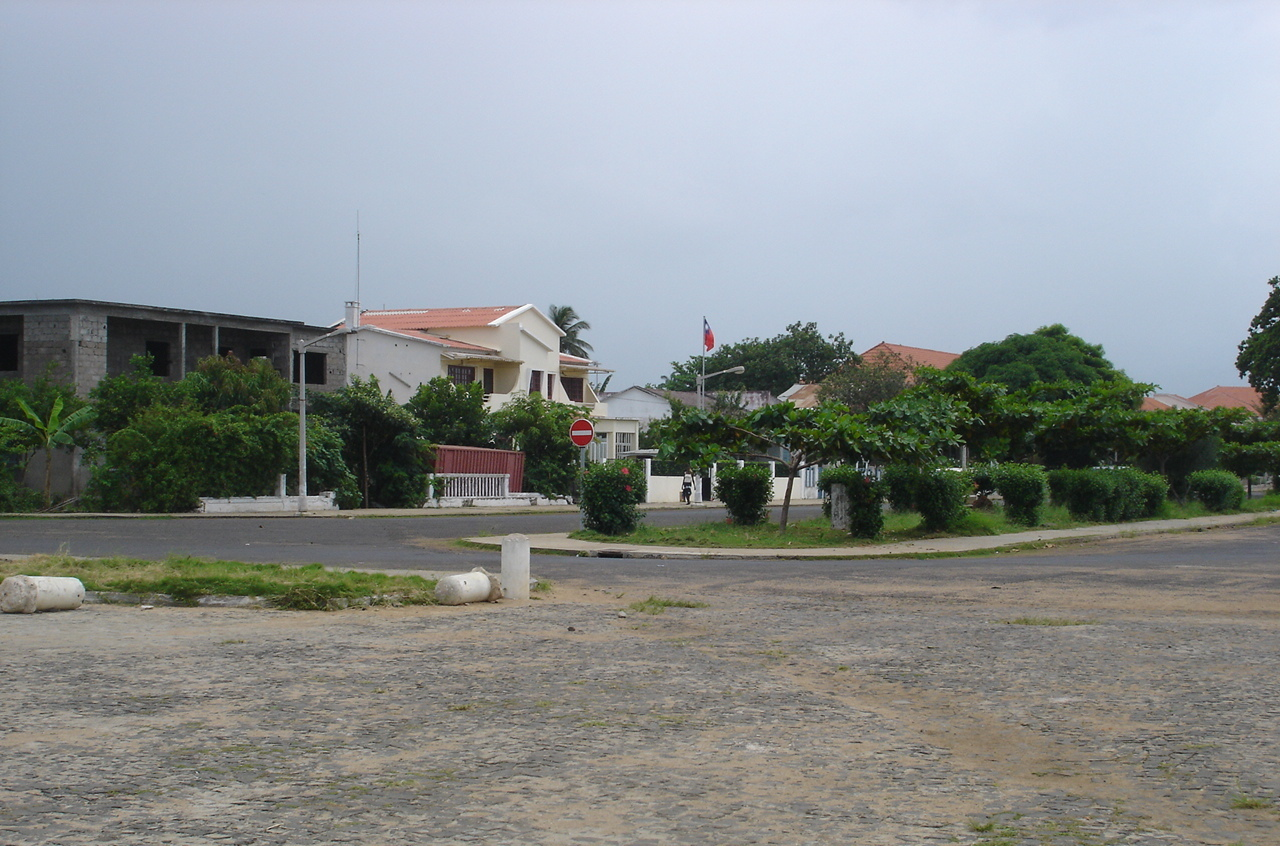
The Embassy of the Republic of China in São Tomé and Príncipe in 2007

São Tomé and Príncipe–Taiwan relations are relations between São Tomé and Príncipe and Taiwan (officially the Republic of China or ROC). Official bilateral relations began in 1997 and ended in 2016 after São Tomé and Principe requested monetary aid, around US$200 million, and Taiwan rejected it; this move is thought to have been influenced by China.

== History ==
São Tomé and Príncipe declared independence from Portugal on 12 July 1975 and recognized the People's Republic of China (PRC) on the same day.

Bilateral relations between São Tomé and Príncipe and the Republic of China were first established on 6 May 1997. In accordance with the One-China policy, the PRC suspended relations with São Tomé and Príncipe on 11 July 1997. In February 1998, ROC Foreign Minister Jason Hu made an official visit to São Tomé and Príncipe. São Tomé and Príncipe President Miguel Trovoada visited Taiwan in June of that year. São Tomé granted Taiwan landing visa privileges in 2012. In 2013, the PRC established a trade office in São Tomé, and the next year President Manuel Pinto da Costa visited China in a private capacity.

São Tomé and Príncipe terminated its bilateral relationship on 21 December 2016. The Taiwan government stated that São Tomé and Príncipe had engaged in “gambling behavior” after Taipei’s denial of São Tomé and Príncipe's request for an exorbitant amount of financial aid and that the country had "approached both sides of the Taiwan Strait to seek the highest bidder". Taiwanese media reports suggest that this request was around US$200 million.

Five days after ending its relationship with Taiwan, São Tomé and Príncipe resumed diplomatic relations with the People's Republic of China. David H. Shinn and academic Joshua Eisenman write that São Tomé and Príncipe's presence at the 2006 Forum Macao meeting as an unofficial observer may have begun the process of São Tomé and Príncipe switching its diplomatic recognition.

== Aid ==
Taiwanese aid to São Tomé and Príncipe focused on agriculture, energy, and technology. Additionally, public health was another key area of cooperation. Many Taiwanese medical professionals have lent their expertise in an effort to stop the spread of malaria in São Tomé. Officials from Taiwan credit this effort for the sharp reduction in the incidence of malaria in São Tomé and Príncipe from 50 percent in 2003 to 1.01 percent in 2015. Taipei Medical University began offering medical aid to São Tomé in 2009, and ended the program upon the cessation of official ties in 2016. Prior to the end of bilateral relations São Tomé was a member of the Taiwan Scholarship program.

== Trade ==
Before São Tomé and Príncipe severed diplomatic ties with Taiwan in 2016, the two countries maintained a modest trade relationship. Taiwan primarily exported industrial goods, machinery, and electronic products to São Tomé and Príncipe, while São Tomé and Príncipe's main exports to Taiwan included agricultural products such as coffee.

Although specific trade volume figures varied significantly year by year, economic exchanges remained limited due to São Tomé and Príncipe's small economy and geographical constraints. Until 2016, the volume of trade between the two nations fluctuated between US$0.5 million and US$3 million.

Following São Tomé and Príncipe’s decision to recognize China in 2016, trade relations with Taiwan came to an abrupt halt and notably declined in the following year. The shift in diplomatic recognition resulted in Taiwan's withdrawal from all aid programs and commercial agreements.

== See also ==
- China–São Tomé and Príncipe relations
