= Brazil–São Tomé and Príncipe relations =

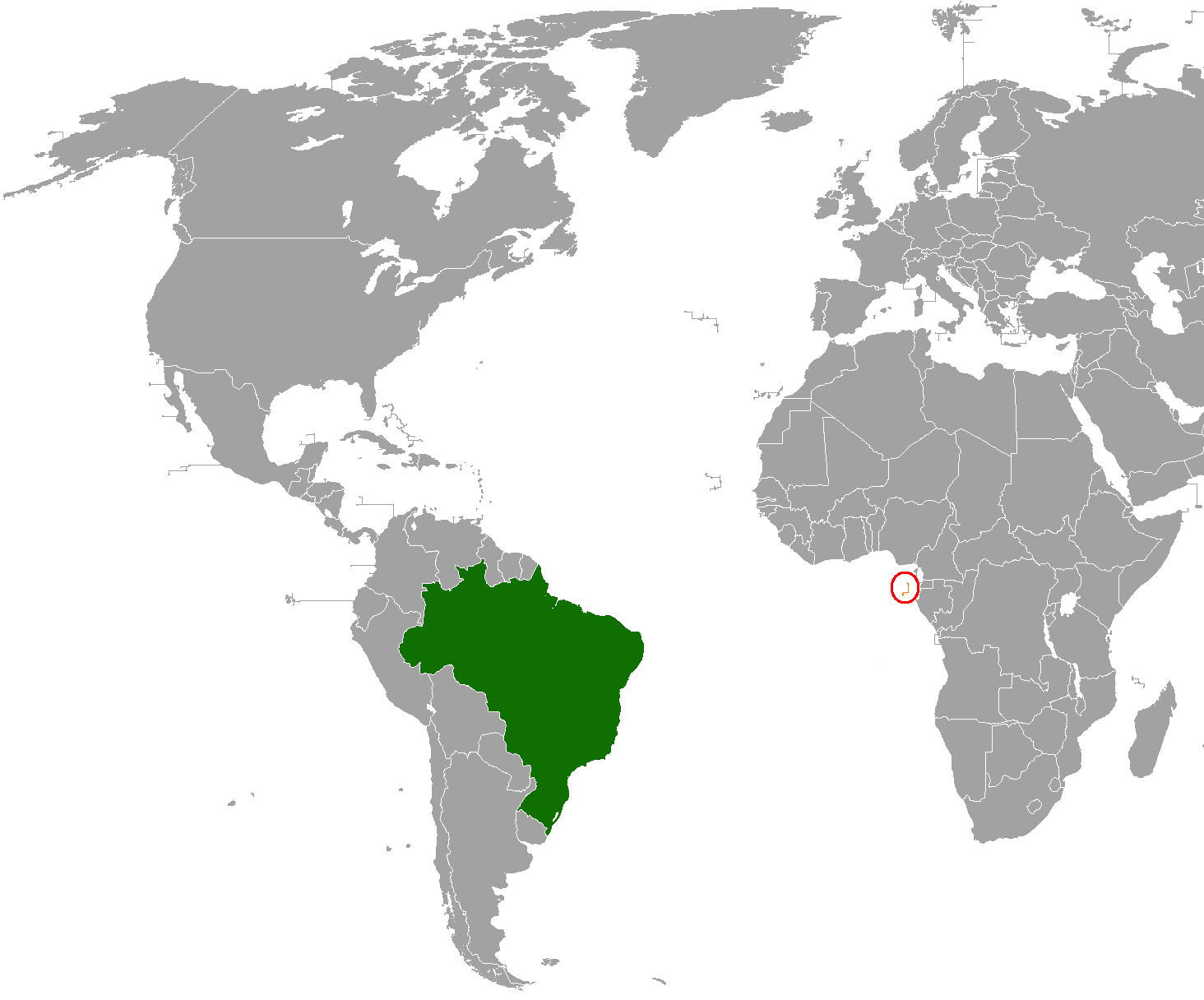

- Brazil: São Tomé and Príncipe

Brazil–São Tomé and Príncipe relations are the bilateral relations between Brazil and São Tomé and Príncipe. Both nations are members of the Community of Portuguese Language Countries, Group of 77 and the United Nations.

== History ==
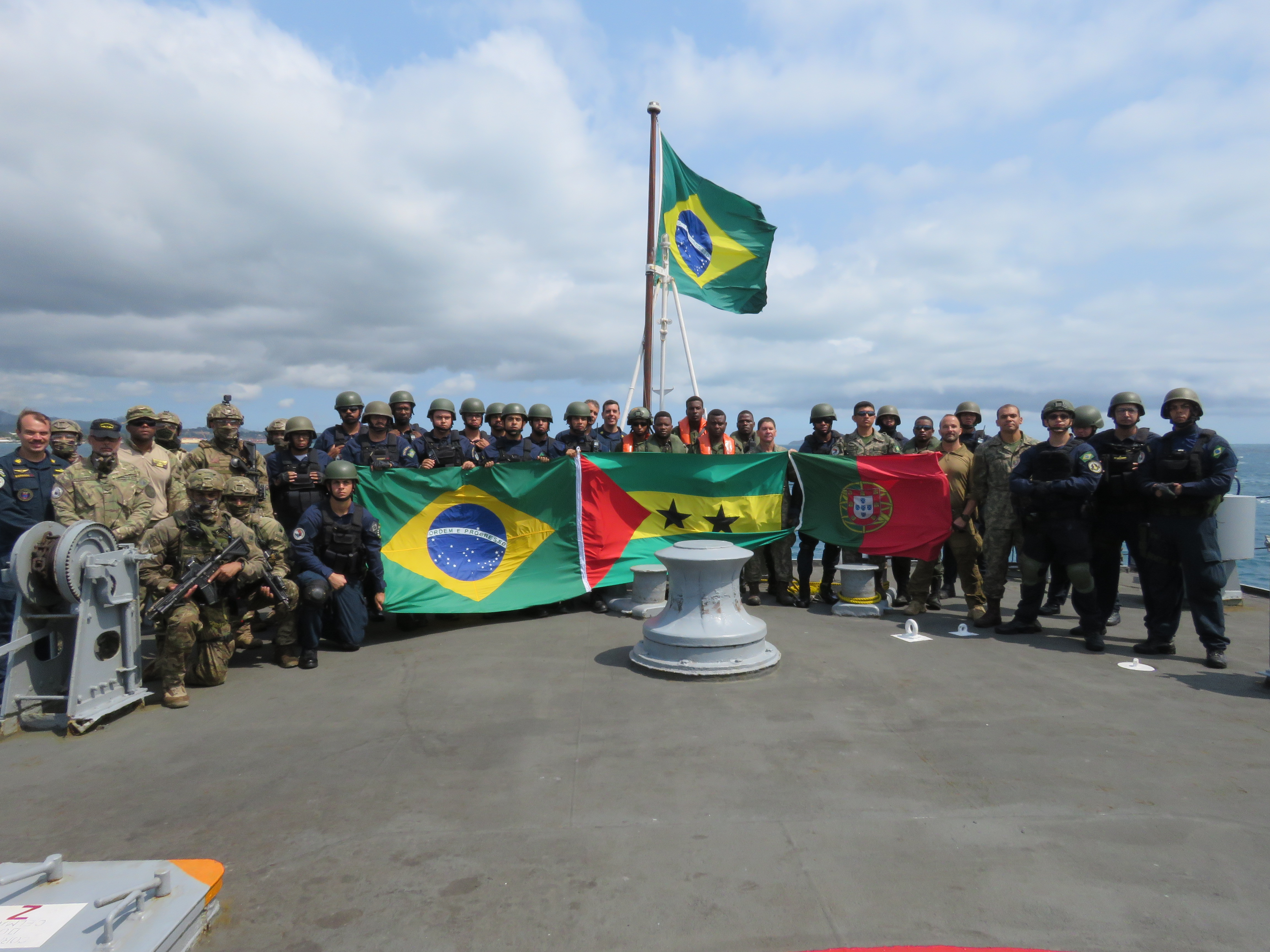
Military training exercise between personnel from Brazil, Portugal and São Tomé and Príncipe; August 2023.

Both Brazil and São Tomé and Príncipe were united for three hundred years as part of the Portuguese Empire. As part of the Portuguese Empire, São Tomé and Príncipe was used as launching point during the Atlantic slave trade from continental Africa to Brazil. From 1815 to 1822, São Tomé and Príncipe was administered by Brazil during the Transfer of the Portuguese court to Brazil.

In July 1975, São Tomé and Príncipe obtained its independence from Portugal. That same year, Brazil recognized São Tomé and Príncipe's independence. In December 1975, Brazil opened an embassy office in São Tomé. In June 1984, both nations signed an Agreement on Cultural Cooperation and an Agreement on Scientific and Technical Cooperation.

In November 2003, Brazilian President Luiz Inácio Lula da Silva paid an official visit to São Tomé and Príncipe, becoming the first Brazilian head-of-state to visit the country. During his visit, President da Silva inaugurated the Brazilian embassy in São Tomé and signed cooperation agreements with projects such as Bolsa Família, family farming, literacy, education and sports. President da Silva also made the symbolic delivery of a batch of 2,592 books donated by the Brazilian Ministry of Culture to São Tomé. In 2004, São Toméan President Fradique de Menezes paid an official visit to Brazil.

In March 2008, the Center for Brazilian Studies was inaugurated in São Tomé. The Brazilian Cooperation Agency assists and develops projects in several diverse areas in São Tomé and Príncipe including infrastructure, agriculture, literacy, health and HIV/AIDS prevention. In 2010, both nations signed and Agreement on Cooperation in the Field of Defense.

In August 2023, Brazilian President Luiz Inácio Lula da Silva paid a third visit to São Tomé and Príncipe to attend the XIV Conferences of Heads of State and Government of the CPLP.

== High-level visits ==
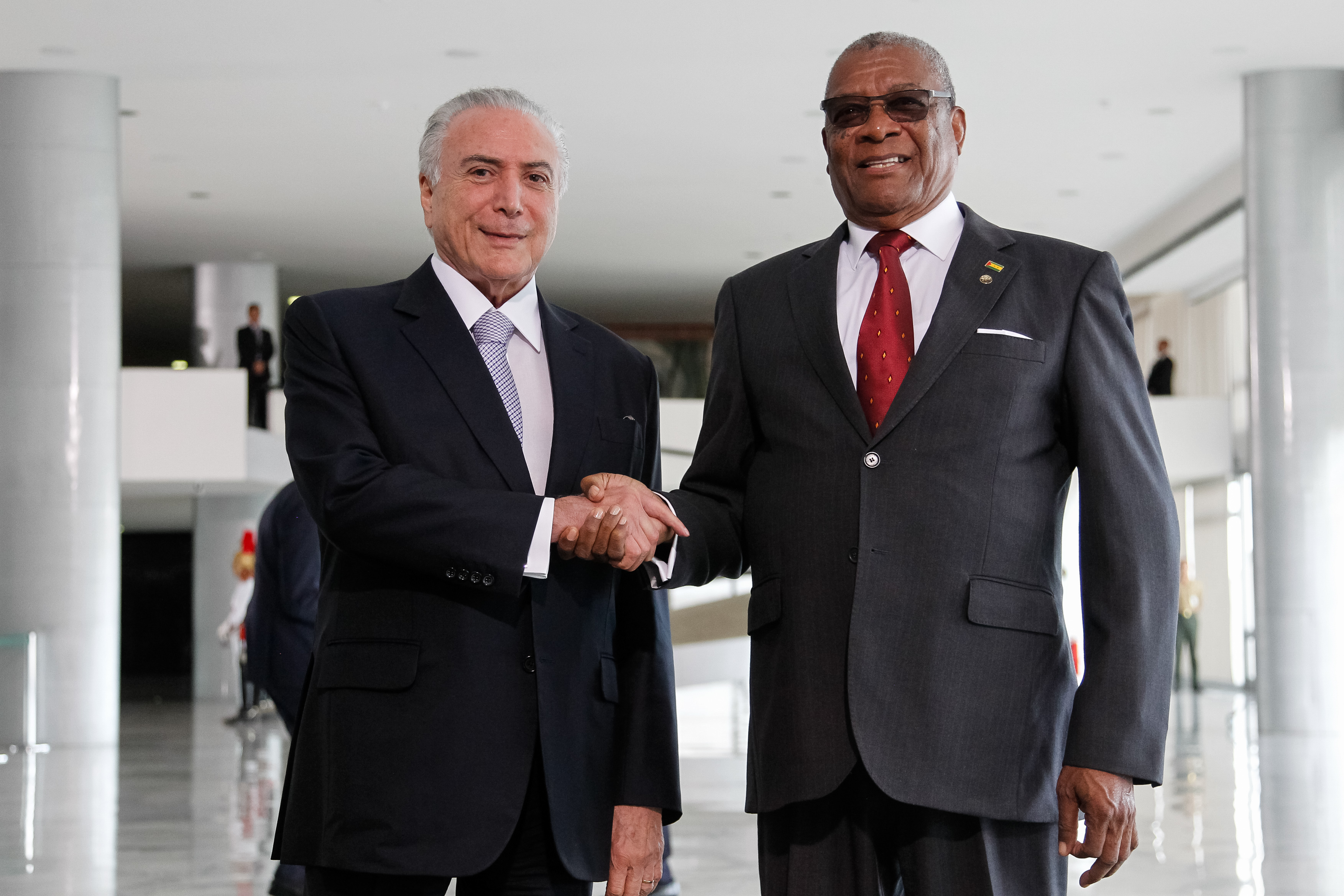
Brazilian President Michel Temer and São Toméan President Evaristo Carvalho in Brasília, 2018.

High-level visits from Brazil to São Tomé and Príncipe

- President Luiz Inácio Lula da Silva (2003, 2004, 2023)
- Foreign Minister Mauro Vieira (2015, 2024)

High-level visits from São Tomé and Príncipe to Brazil

- Foreign Minister Maria do Nascimento da Graça Amorim (1984)
- Foreign Minister Alberto Paulino (2000)
- President Fradique de Menezes (2002, 2004, 2005)
- Foreign Minister Ovídio Manuel Barbosa Pequeno (2004, 2005)
- Foreign Minister Carlos Augusto dos Anjos (2007)
- Prime Minister Joaquim Rafael Branco (2009)
- Foreign Minister Carlos Tiny (2009, 2010)
- President Evaristo Carvalho (2016, 2018)
- Foreign Minister Alberto Neto Pereira (2023)
- Prime Minister Patrice Trovoada (2023)
- Foreign Minister Ilza Amado Vaz (2025)

== Resident diplomatic missions ==
- Brazil has an embassy in São Tomé.
- São Tomé and Príncipe is accredited to Brazil from its Permanent Mission to the United Nations in New York.

== See also ==
- Foreign relations of São Tomé and Príncipe
- Foreign relations of Brazil
- Lusophone Games
- United Kingdom of Portugal, Brazil and the Algarves
