= Politics of São Tomé and Príncipe =

The politics of São Tomé and Príncipe takes place in a framework of a unitary semi-presidential representative democratic republic, whereby the President of São Tomé and Príncipe is head of state and the Prime Minister of São Tomé and Príncipe is head of government, and of a multi-party system. Executive power is exercised by the President and the Government. Legislative power is vested in both the government and the National Assembly. The Judiciary is independent of the executive and the legislature. São Tomé has functioned under a multiparty system since 1990. Following the promulgation of a new constitution in 1990, São Tomé and Príncipe held multiparty elections for the first time since independence. Shortly after the constitution took effect, the National Assembly formally legalized opposition parties. Independent candidates also were permitted to participate in the January 1991 legislative elections.

== Executive branch ==
Main office-holders
Office	Name	Party	Since
President	Carlos Vila Nova	Independent Democratic Action	2 October 2021
Prime Minister	Americo Ramos	Independent Democratic Action	10 November 2022

The president of the republic is elected to a five-year term by direct universal suffrage and a secret ballot, and may hold up to two consecutive terms. Candidates are chosen at their party's national conference (or individuals may run independently). A presidential candidate must obtain an outright majority of the popular vote in either a first or second round of voting in order to be elected president. The prime minister is named by the president but must be ratified by the majority party and thus normally comes from a list of its choosing. The prime minister, in turn, names the 14 members of the cabinet.

On 11 November 2022, Patrice Trovoada was appointed Prime Minister of São Tomé and Príncipe by the President of the Republic of São Tomé, Carlos Vila Nova.

== Legislative branch ==
The National Assembly (Assembleia Nacional) has 55 members, elected for a four-year term in seven multi-member constituencies by proportional representation. It is the supreme organ of the state and the highest legislative body, and meets semiannually.

== Judicial branch ==
Justice is administered at the highest level by the Supreme Court of São Tomé and Príncipe. Formerly responsible to the National Assembly, the judiciary is now independent under the new constitution.

=== Ordem dos Advogados de São Tomé e Príncipe ===
As for the legal profession, the São Tomé and Príncipe Lawyers Association (Ordem dos Advogados de São Tomé e Príncipe) was created in 2006. There is no clear indication as to how certain demographic groups, such as women, have fared in the legal field.

==== List of Bastonários ====
- Edmar Carvalho (2006-2010) [1st Bastonário]
- Gabriel Costa (2011-2012)
- Celiza de Deus Lima (2012-2014) [1st Bastonária]
- André Aragão (2014-2017)
- Célia Posser (2017–present)

== Administrative divisions ==
Administratively, the country is divided into seven municipal districts, six on São Tomé and one comprising Príncipe. Governing councils in each district maintain a limited number of autonomous decision-making powers, and are reelected every 5 years. Príncipe has had self-government since 29 April 1995.

== Human rights and democracy ==
Since the constitutional reforms of 1990 and the elections of 1991, São Tomé and Príncipe has made great strides toward developing its democratic institutions and further guaranteeing the civil and human rights of its citizens. São Toméans have freely changed their government through peaceful and transparent elections, and while there have been disagreements and political conflicts within the branches of government and the National Assembly, the debates have been carried out and resolved in open, democratic, and legal fora, in accordance with the provisions of São Toméan law. A number of political parties actively participate in government and openly express their views. Freedom of the press is respected, and there are several independent newspapers in addition to the government bulletin. The government's respect for human rights is exemplary; the government does not engage in repressive measures against its citizens, and respect for individuals' rights to due process and protection from government abuses is widely honored. Freedom of expression is accepted, and the government has taken no repressive measures to silence critics.

A briefly successful coup d'état led by Major Fernando "Cobo" Pereira took place on 16 July 2003.

== International organization participation ==
The country is member of the ACCT, ACP, AfDB, CEEAC, CPLP, ECA, FAO, G-77, IBRD, ICAO, ICRM, IDA, IFAD, IFRCS, ILO, IMF, International Maritime Organization, Intelsat (nonsignatory user), Interpol, IOC, IOM (observer), ITU, NAM, OAU, United Nations, UNCTAD, UNESCO, UNIDO, UPU, WHO, WIPO, WMO, World Tourism Organization, World Trade Organization (applicant)
