= Visa policy of São Tomé and Príncipe =

Policy on permits required to enter São Tomé and Príncipe

Visitors to São Tomé and Príncipe must obtain an e-Visa unless they are citizens from one of the visa-exempt countries or citizens who may obtain a visa on arrival.

== Visa policy map ==
Visa policy of São Tomé and Príncipe São Tomé and Príncipe Visa not required (90 days) Visa not required (15 days) Visa on arrival (15 days) / eVisa eVisa Admission refused

== Visa exemption ==
=== Ordinary passports ===
Citizens of the following countries may enter São Tomé and Príncipe without a visa for the following period:

90 days

- Togo

15 days

- All European Union member states

- Andorra
- Angola
- Brazil
- Canada
- Cape Verde
- Equatorial Guinea
- Gabon
- Guinea-Bissau
- Iceland
- Japan
- Kuwait
- Liechtenstein
- Monaco
- Morocco
- Mozambique
- Norway
- Qatar
- Russia
- Rwanda
- San Marino
- South Korea
- Switzerland
- Timor-Leste
- Turkey
- United Arab Emirates
- United Kingdom
- United States
- Vatican City

Date of visa changes
- Unknown: Rwanda, Togo
- 2015: Angola, Brazil, Canada, Cape Verde, Equatorial Guinea, European Union citizens, Guinea-Bissau, Mozambique, Portugal, Timor-Leste
- 25 April 2017: Andorra, Gabon, Iceland, Japan, Kuwait, Liechtenstein, Monaco, Morocco, Norway, Qatar, Russia, San Marino, South Korea, Switzerland, Turkey, United Arab Emirates, United Kingdom, United States, Vatican City

=== Non-ordinary passports ===
In addition, holders of diplomatic or service passports and passports for public affairs of China may enter São Tomé and Príncipe without a visa for 30 days.

=== Substitute visa ===
Holders of a visa or resident permit issued by the any Schengen area member state or the United States may enter São Tomé and Príncipe without a visa for up to 15 days.

=== Future changes ===
São Tomé and Príncipe has signed visa exemption agreements with the following countries, but they have not yet been ratified:

Country	Passports	Agreement signed on
Serbia	Diplomatic, service	6 July 2022
Saint Kitts and Nevis	All	22 March 2019

== Visa on arrival ==
Holders of ordinary passports issued by China may obtain a visa on arrival for 15 days.

== Electronic visa (e-Visa) ==
Citizens of countries ans territories that require a visa may obtain online through an e-VisaST system. An e-Visa is processed within 7 working days.

== Transit ==
Transit passengers must have a confirmed onward ticket for a flight to a third country on the same calendar day. The passengers must stay in the international transit area of the airport and have documents required for the next destination.

== Taiwan ==
Holders of passports isuued by Taiwan cannot apply for an e-Visa. Taiwan is not included when applying for an e-Visa.

However, the Timatic makes no mention of an entry ban for Taiwanese citizens.

== See also ==
- Visa requirements for Santomean citizens
