= Cruzado Plan =

Brazilian economic plan

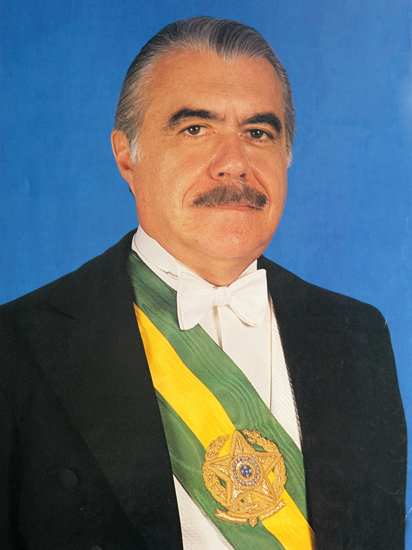
José Sarney's official photo.

The Cruzado Plan (Portuguese: Plano Cruzado) was a set of economic measures launched by the Brazilian government on February 28, 1986, based on Decree-Law No. 2883 of February 27, 1986, with José Sarney as president and Dilson Funaro as Minister of Finance. The plan was approved in the Chamber of Deputies with 344 votes in favor and 13 against, while in the Federal Senate only 1 of the 49 parliamentarians voted against.

The main goal of the plan was the price control. Food, fuel and services had their costs regulated by the administration. The measures contradicted the recommendation of the International Monetary Fund, which were accused by the government of being "speculators".

The Cruzado Plan reduced inflation from 12.49% in February 1986 to 1.40% in October of the same year. As a result, the Sarney government became extremely popular, the PMDB elected 53% of the federal deputies and the PFL 24% - providing the administration with a 77% majority in Brazil's federal elections in 1986. The plan was praised by newspaper and politicians, such as José Serra, Maria da Conceição Tavares, Plínio de Arruda and Aloízio Mercadante. Leonel Brizola and Roberto Campos, creator of the BNDES, were the project's biggest critics.

Due to price controls on products and services, supplies became scarcer. Exports fell, imports increased and foreign exchange reserves were depleted. Six days after the federal elections in Brazil in 1986, the government launched the Cruzado Plan II. In 2005, José Sarney admitted that the Cruzado Plan was a mistake.

== Authors ==
In addition to Dilson Funaro, other economists were involved in drafting the plan, such as João Sayad, Edmar Bacha, André Lara Resende and Persio Arida. On January 16, João Sayad, Persio Arida, André Lara Resende, Oswaldo de Assis and Jorge Murad (President Sarney's son-in-law) voted in favor of the project; Dilson Funaro, João Manuel Cardoso de Mello, Luiz Gonzaga Belluzzo, Andrea Calabi and Edmar Bacha considered it too risky. With the refusal of the majority, João Sayad, Minister of Planning, said he would resign. Jorge Murad convinced Sarney to adopt the Cruzado Plan, supporting Sayad, Persio Arida, Andre Lara Resende in favor of the plan.

Once adopted, the project attracted massive popular support. According to Hérica Lene:

Hyperinflation created turmoil in people's daily lives, in everyday tasks. Suddenly we wake up on February 28, 1986 and say: inflation is over, the currency is different, zeros have been cut off, everything is going to be different now, there's a table for you to pay your bills and collect debts from others, and everything is different. Prices will be fixed. Here's the table.

== Main measures ==
The main measures of the Cruzado Plan were issued by Decree Laws No. 2883 and No. 2884, of February 28, 1986 and March 10, 1986, respectively.

=== Introduction of a new currency ===
The unit of the Brazilian monetary system became the cruzado (Cz$), replacing the cruzeiro. The conversion of values was fixed at the rate of one thousand cruzeiros for each cruzado.

=== Conversion rule for contractual bonds ===
Different criteria were applied to bonds with indexation clauses and those without. Regarding bonds without an indexation clause, it was established that as of March 3, 1986, the cruzado would have a daily appreciation of 0.45% in relation to the cruzeiro, equivalent to a monthly inflation of 14.42% of the old currency. For bonds with an indexation clause, the conversion was carried out in two stages. In the first, the amounts in cruzeiros were updated to the cruzados of February 28, 1986, by applying monetary correction pro rata. In the second stage, the values calculated were converted into cruzados at the rate of one cruzado for every thousand cruzeiros. This procedure was used to convert the balances of savings accounts, the Length-of-Service Guarantee Fund (FGTS in Portuguese) and the PIS/PASEP Participation Fund.

=== De-indexation ===
The National Treasury Adjustable Bond - ORTN (Portuguese: Obrigação Reajustável do Tesouro Nacional), adjusted monthly by the inflation rate, was abolished. The National Treasury Bond - OTN (Portuguese: Obrigação do Tesouro Nacional) was created to replace it, and its price was frozen until March 3, 1987. The use of monetary correction clauses in contracts with terms of less than one year was banned. Monetary adjustment for savings accounts (FGTS and PIS/PASEP) was maintained.

=== Conversion of wages to cruzados ===
Wages were converted to cruzados at their real average values, according to the IBGE's National Consumer Price Index (IPCA). An 8% bonus was added to the average real value. The value set for the minimum wage incorporated a 16% bonus.

=== Indexation of wages ===
Wages were indexed according to a floating scale, which would automatically adjust wages every time accumulated inflation reached 20%. On the basic adjustment dates for each professional category, wages would be adjusted by at least 60% of the accumulated variation of 60% of inflation, measured by the IBGE consumer price index.

=== Other conversions ===
Rents, installments from the Housing Finance System (Portuguese: Sistema Financeiro de Habitação) and school fees were converted into cruzados according to the real average value principle.

=== Exchange rate policy ===
The exchange rate was fixed at 13 cruzados and 80 cents per dollar. However, this value was not permanent, as the Central Bank of Brazil could change it at any time.

== Controversies ==
=== Dates used in price and salary conversions ===
The developers neglected to include forward prices of 30, 60 and 90 days at their present cash value. Products sold with 30 days had a real increase of 17%, the average inflation of the time built into the prices. Pérsio Arida apologized for his mistake, claiming that he had examined Argentina and Israel, which were experiencing hyperinflation but had no forward sales. This mistake disrupted the economy's relative prices, paralyzed production for a month and created conflict between suppliers and customers as they discussed new real prices.

== Failure factors ==
=== Frozen prices ===
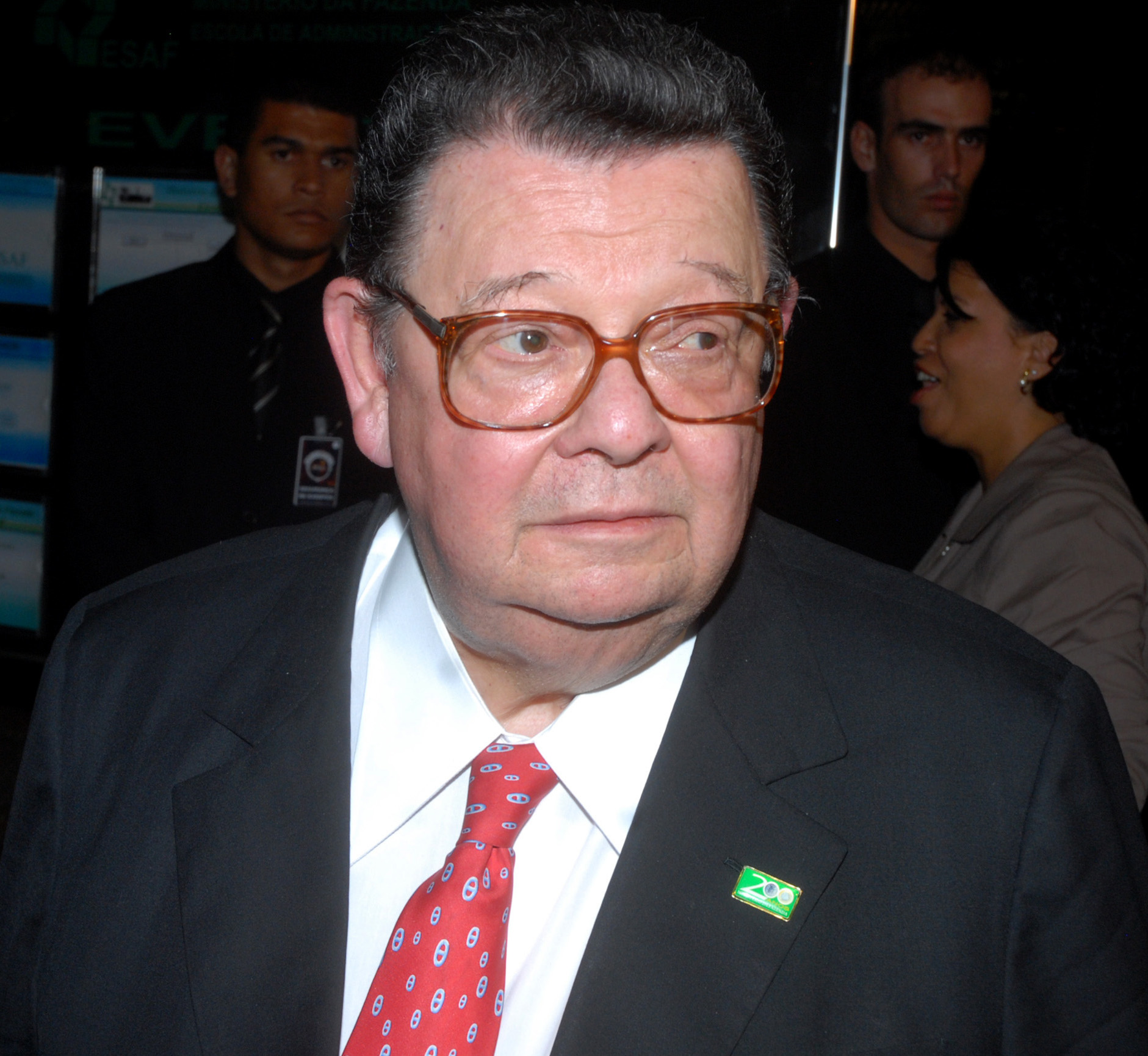
Delfim Netto.

The main reason for the plan's failure was the frozen prices, which caused producers' profitability to collapse. The lack of price variability led to products being absent from the market, which made consumers "stock up" on products at home.

=== Government spending ===
The government was not responsible enough to control its spending, which led Brazil to lose large amounts of international reserves.

=== Upcoming elections ===
The upcoming elections made the government avoid unpopular measures that would guarantee the plan's viability. After the elections, the administration unfroze prices. The following year, inflation reaccelerated to a greater degree than before the plan. For many oppositionists, such as Delfim Netto, the Cruzado Plan was inconsistent, populist and aimed only at increasing the popularity of the government and its candidates during the election.

== Results ==
Many lawsuits demanding compensation from banks and governments for the monetary losses they suffered arose because of the Cruzado Plan. The project also caused a deterioration in Brazil's balance of payments, which resulted in a collapse in international reserves. Unable to honor its external commitments, Brazil had to declare a moratorium on its foreign debt in 1987.

== Cruzado Plan II ==
The second Cruzado Plan was launched on November 21, 1986. Wages were also frozen. If inflation reached 20% per month, all salaries would be automatically adjusted at the same rate, including any differences negotiated in the collective agreements of the different categories. Inflation was immediately contained and the purchasing power of wages suddenly increased. However, four months later, the plan was already failing. Demand increased but goods, whose prices had been frozen, disappeared. At the end of July, the Cruzado Plan II was decreed; car and fuel prices were increased by 30%, while the government continued to talk about "zero inflation".

From July to October 1986, the government remained silent about the increasing scarcity of products and the deterioration of external accounts. The "Cruzadinho" was a limited fiscal package that involved the creation of a system of compulsory loans on the purchase of gasoline and cars and non-refundable taxes on the purchase of foreign currency and international airline tickets. Expectations of a price thaw stimulated demand. Exports fell, while imports increased, depleting foreign exchange reserves. The government had decided to formally maintain the price freeze until the elections on November 15 of that year.

=== Main proposals ===
- Partial release of prices for products and services;
- Rent adjustments negotiated between landlords and tenants;
- Alteration to the calculation of inflation, which would be based on the spending of families with incomes of up to five minimum wages;
- Increased taxes on drinks and cigarettes;
- Increase in public service tariffs;
- Increased tax burden;
- Reindexation of the economy.

The population faced several price increases: 60% for gasoline; 120% for telephones and energy; 100% for drinks; 80% for cars; 45% to 100% for cigarettes. In Brasília, a demonstration known as the "badernaço" on November 27 resulted in looting, destruction and arson. On June 25, 1987, a crowd stoned the President's bus in downtown Rio de Janeiro.

There were also problems with the payroll. The exchange rate, officially frozen, was overvalued, favoring increased imports and harming exports. On February 20, 1987, faced with the vertiginous fall in foreign exchange reserves, Minister Funaro suspended payments of the foreign debt service to private banks. The government quit controlling the prices and re-established indexation. By January 1987, inflation had reached 16.8%. In May 1987, the Minister of Finance, Dílson Funaro, was replaced by Luís Carlos Bresser Pereira.

== See also ==
- Real Plan
- Hyperinflation in Brazil
- Collor Plan
- List of economic crises in Brazil
