= Presidency of José Sarney =

Brazilian presidential administration from 1985 to 1990

- Official portrait, 1985
- Presidency of José Sarney; 15 March 1985 – 15 March 1990
- Vice President: None
- Party: PMDB
- Election: 1985 (Note: Tancredo Neves was indirectly elected, but died before taking office)
- Seat: Alvorada Palace

The presidency of José Sarney, also called the José Sarney government (15 March 1985 – 15 March 1990) was a period in Brazilian political history that corresponds to José Ribamar Ferreira Araújo da Costa Sarney's first mandate as President of the Republic until his succession by Fernando Collor. Sarney took over the position on an interim basis after Tancredo Neves was hospitalized, and definitively on 21 April 1985, with his death, when Sarney became the first civilian president after more than twenty years of military dictatorship in Brazil.

The Sarney government recorded a growth of 22.72% in GDP (average of 4.54%) and 12.51% in per capita income (average of 2.5%). Sarney took office with inflation at 242.24% and delivered at 1972.91%.

== Background ==
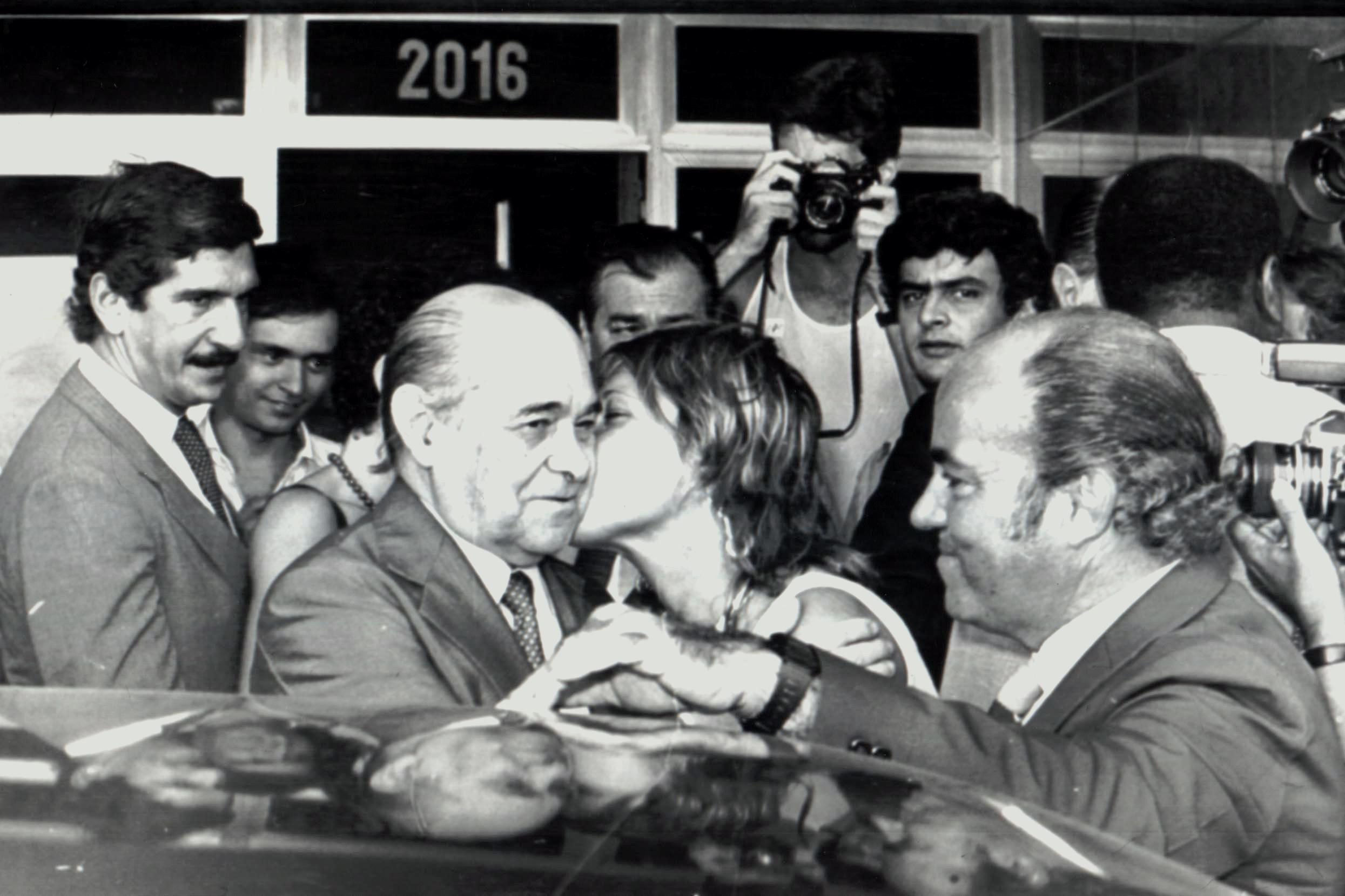
Tancredo Neves is greeted by people in Brasília, 1984

The country had been ruled by a military dictatorship since the Civil-Military Coup of 1964. The government was weakened, divided between the hard-line (more radical) military and the moderate military. The economy was suffering from high inflation, people were taking to the streets in the so-called "Diretas Já". Military officer Ernesto Geisel, president between 1974 and 1979, guaranteed a "slow, safe and gradual distension". Thus began the political opening. Little by little, the opposition, the old Brazilian Democratic Movement (MDB) gained strength. But it was under the government of João Figueiredo (1979-1985) that the country went over to civilians, after years of frustration. In 1985, Tancredo Neves was elected by the electoral college with 480 votes against 180 for Paulo Maluf who represented the dictatorship.

On the eve of Tancredo's inauguration on 14 March 1985, he was hospitalized. The next day, José Sarney took over on an interim basis until the incumbent took office. On 21 April 1985, Tancredo died at the age of 75, and José Sarney became permanent president.

== Ministers of State ==
Ministries
| Ministry | Minister | Term of office | Notes |
|---|---|---|---|
| Ministry of State Extraordinary for Administration Affairs | Aluízio Alves | 15 March 1985 to 4 September 1986 | Ministry replaced by the Secretariat of Public Administration on 3 September 1986. |
| Ministry of State Extraordinary for Irrigation Affairs | Vicente Cavalcante Fialho | 14 February 1986 to 15 February 1989 | Ministry extinct. |
| Ministry of Aeronautics | Octávio Júlio Moreira Lima | 15 March 1985 to 15 March 1990 | The minister was a lieutenant brigadier. Ministry extinct in 2001. |
| Ministry of Agriculture | Pedro Jorge Simon | 15 March 1985 to 14 February 1986 | |
| Ministry of Agriculture | Iris Rezende Machado | 14 February 1986 to 15 March 1990 | |
| Ministério da Ciência e Tecnologia | Renato Bayma Archer da Silva | 15 March 1985 to 22 October 1987 | Ministry replaced by the State Ministry of Industrial Development, Science and Technology |
| Ministério da Ciência e Tecnologia | Luiz Henrique da Silveira | 22 October 1987 to 29 September 1988 | Ministry replaced by the State Ministry of Industrial Development, Science and Technology |
| Ministério da Ciência e Tecnologia | Luiz André Rico Vicente | 29 September 1980 to 16 August 1988 | Ministry replaced by the State Ministry of Industrial Development, Science and Technology |
| Ministério da Ciência e Tecnologia | Ralph Biasi | 16 August 1988 to 15 January 1989 | Ministry replaced by the State Ministry of Industrial Development, Science and Technology |
| Ministry of Culture | José Aparecido de Oliveira | 15 March 1985 to 9 May 1985, 21 September 1988 to 15 March 1990 | |
| Ministry of Culture | Aluísio Pimenta | 29 May 1985 to 14 February 1986 | |
| Ministry of Culture | Celso Monteiro Furtado | 14 February 1986 to 1 August 1988 | |
| Ministry of Culture | Hugo Napoleão do Rego Neto | 1 August 1988 through 21 September 1988 | |
| Ministry of Education | Marco Antônio de Oliveira Maciel | 15 March 1985 to 14 February 1986 | |
| Ministry of Education | Jorge Konder Bornhausen | 14 February 1986 to 6 October 1987 | |
| Ministry of Education | Aloísio Guimarães Sotero | 6 October 1987 to 30 October 1987 | |
| Ministry of Education | Hugo Napoleão do Rego Neto | 30 October 1987 to 17 January 1989 | |
| Ministry of Education | Carlos Corrêa de Menezes Sant'anna | 17 January 1989 to 15 March 1990 | |
| Ministry of the Army | Leônidas Pires Gonçalves | 15 March 1985 to 15 March 1990 | The minister was an Army General |
| Ministry of Finance | Francisco Oswaldo Neves Dornelles | 15 March 1985 to 26 August 1985 | |
| Ministry of Finance | Dilson Domingos Funaro | 26 August 1985 to 29 April 1987 | |
| Ministry of Finance | Luiz Carlos Bresser Gonçalves Pereira | 29 April 1987 to 21 December 1987 | |
| Ministry of Finance | Maílson Ferreira da Nóbrega | 13 May 1987 to 15 March 1990 | |
| Ministry of Housing, Urbanism and Environment | Luiz Humberto Prisco Viana | 23 October 1987 to 5 September 1988 | Changed its name to Ministry of Housing and Social Welfare |
| Ministry of Housing and Social Welfare | Luiz Humberto Prisco Viana | 5 September 1988 to 15 February 1989 | Ministry extinct. |
| Ministry of Industry and Trade | Roberto Herbster Gusmão | 15 March 1985 to 14 February 1986 | Replaced by State Ministry of Industrial Development, Science and Technology |
| Ministry of Industry and Trade | José Hugo Castelo Branco | 14 February 1986 to 4 August 1988 | Replaced by State Ministry of Industrial Development, Science and Technology |
| Ministry of Industry and Trade | Luiz André Rico Vicente | 5 August 1988 to 17 August 1988 | Replaced by State Ministry of Industrial Development, Science and Technology |
| Ministry of Industry and Trade | Roberto Cardoso Alves | 17 August 1988 to 14 February 1989 | Replaced by State Ministry of Industrial Development, Science and Technology |
| Ministry of Justice | Fernando Soares Lyra | 15 March 1985 to 14 February 1986 | |
| Ministry of Justice | Paulo Brossard de Souza Pinto | 14 February 1986 to 19 January 1989 | |
| Ministry of Justice | Oscar Dias Correia | 19 January 1989 to 9 August 1989 | |
| Ministry of Justice | José Saulo Pereira Ramos | 9 August 1989 to 15 March 1990 | |
| Ministry of Navy | Henrique Saboia | 15 March 1985 to 15 March 1990 | The minister was an admiral. |
| Ministry of Social Security and Assistance | Francisco Waldir Pires de Souza | 15 March 1985 to 13 February 1986 | |
| Ministry of Social Security and Assistance | Raphael de Almeida Magalhães | 18 February 1986 to 22 October 1987 | |
| Ministry of Social Security and Assistance | Renato Bayma Archer da Silva | 27 October 1987 to 28 July 1988 | |
| Ministry of Social Security and Assistance | Jader Fontenelle Barbalho | 29 July 1988 to 14 March 1990 | |
| Ministry of Agrarian Reform and Development | Nélson de Figueiredo Ribeiro | 30 April 1985 to 28 May 1986 | Ministry extinct. |
| Ministry of Agrarian Reform and Development | Dante Martins de Oliveira | 28 May 1986 to 2 June 1987 | |
| Ministry of Agrarian Reform and Development | Iris Rezende Machado | 2 June 1987 to 4 June 1987, 9 September 1987 through 22 September 1987 29 July 1988 through 11 August 1988 | |
| Ministry of Agrarian Reform and Development | Marcos de Barros Freire | 4 June 1987 to 29 July 1988 | |
| Ministry of Agrarian Reform and Development | Jader Fontenelle Barbalho | 22 September 1987 to 29 July 1988 | |
| Ministry of Agrarian Reform and Development | Lázaro Ferreira Barboza | 11 August 1988 to 16 August 1988 | |
| Ministry of Agrarian Reform and Development | Leopoldo Pacheco Bessone | 17 August 1988 to 15 February 1989 | |
| Ministry of Health | Carlos Corrêa de Menezes Sant'anna | 15 March 1985 to 13 February 1986 | |
| Ministry of Health | Roberto Figueira Santos | 14 February 1986 to 23 November 1987 | |
| Ministry of Health | Luiz Carlos Borges da Silveira | 23 November 1987 to 15 January 1989 | |
| Ministry of Health | Seigo Tsuzuki | 16 January 1989 to 14 March 1990 | |
| Ministry of Communications | Antônio Carlos Peixoto de Magalhães | 15 March 1985 to 15 March 1990 | |
| Ministry of Mines and Energy | Antônio Aureliano Chaves de Mendonça | 15 March 1985 to 22 December 1988 | |
| Ministry of Mines and Energy | Iris Rezende Machado | 22 December 1988 to 17 January 1989 | |
| Ministry of Mines and Energy | Vicente Cavalcante Fialho | 17 January 1989 to 15 March 1990 | |
| Ministry of Foreign Affairs | Olavo Egídio de Sousa Aranha Setúbal | 15 March 1985 to 14 February 1986 | |
| Ministry of Foreign Affairs | Roberto Costa de Abreu Sodré | 14 February 1986 to 15 March 1990 | |
| Ministry of Industrial Development, Science and Technology | Roberto Cardoso Alves | 16 February 1989 to 14 March 1989 | It was called the Ministry of Industrial Development, Science and Technology, and later the Ministry of Industry and Trade Development. |
| Ministry of Urban Development and Environment | Flávio Rios Peixoto da Silveira | 15 March 1985 to 14 February 1986 | Changed its name to Ministry of Housing, Urbanism and Environment |
| Ministry of Urban Development and Environment | Deni Lineu Schwartz | 14 February 1986 to 23 October 1987 | Changed its name to Ministry of Housing, Urbanism and Environment |
| Ministry of Interior | Ronaldo Costa Couto | 15 March 1985 to 30 April 1987 | Ministry extinct. |
| Ministry of Interior | Joaquim Francisco de Freitas Cavalcanti | 30 April 1987 to 7 August 1987 | Ministry extinct. |
| Ministry of Interior | João Alves Filho | 7 August 1987 to 15 March 1990 | Ministry extinct. |
| Ministry of Labour | Almir Pazzianotto Pinto | 15 March 1985 to 27 September 1988 | |
| Ministry of Labour | Erós Antônio de Almeida | 28 September 1988 through 14 October 1988 | |
| Ministry of Labour | Ronaldo Costa Couto | 14 October 1988 to 13 January 1989 | |
| Ministry of Labour | Dorothea Fonseca Furquim Werneck | 13 January 1989 to 15 March 1990 | |
| Ministry of Transportation | Affonso Alves de Camargo Neto | 14 March 1985 to 14 February 1986 | |
| Ministry of Transportation | José Reinaldo Carneiro Tavares | 14 February 1986 to 15 March 1990 | |

President's office
| President's office | Chief Minister | Term | Notes |
|---|---|---|---|
| Institutional Security Bureau | Rubens Bayma Denys | 15 March 1985 to 15 March 1990 | The minister was a division general. |
| Civil Office | José Hugo Castelo Branco | 15 March 1985 to 14 February 1986 | |
| Civil Office | Marco Antônio de Oliveira Maciel | 14 February 1986 to 30 April 1987 | |
| Civil Office | Ronaldo Costa Couto | 30 April 1987 to 15 December 1989 | |
| Civil Office | Luís Roberto Andrade Ponte | 21 December 1989 to 15 March 1990 | |
| National Information Service | Ivan de Sousa Mendes | 15 March 1985 to 15 March 1990 | The minister was an army general. |
| Armed Forces General Staff | José Maria do Amaral Oliveira | 15 March 1985 to 15 September 1986 | José Maria was an admiral. Paulo Campos and Jonas were army generals. Paulo Roberto was a lieutenant brigadier. Valbert was an admiral. The organ was extinct. |
| Armed Forces General Staff | Paulo Campos Paiva | 15 September 1986 to 14 September 1987 | José Maria was an admiral. Paulo Campos and Jonas were army generals. Paulo Roberto was a lieutenant brigadier. Valbert was an admiral. The organ was extinct. |
| Armed Forces General Staff | Paulo Roberto Coutinho Camarinha | 14 September 1987 to 20 June 1988 | José Maria was an admiral. Paulo Campos and Jonas were army generals. Paulo Roberto was a lieutenant brigadier. Valbert was an admiral. The organ was extinct. |
| Armed Forces General Staff | Valbert Lisieux Medeiros de Figueiredo | 20 June 1988 to 5 January 1990 | José Maria was an admiral. Paulo Campos and Jonas were army generals. Paulo Roberto was a lieutenant brigadier. Valbert was an admiral. The organ was extinct. |
| Armed Forces General Staff | Jonas de Morais Correia Neto | 5 January 1990 to 15 March 1990 | José Maria was an admiral. Paulo Campos and Jonas were army generals. Paulo Roberto was a lieutenant brigadier. Valbert was an admiral. The organ was extinct. |
| Secretariat of Planning of the Presidency of the Republic | João Sayad | 15 March 1985 to 23 March 1987 | Changed its name to Secretariat for Planning and Coordination of the Presidency of the Republic |
| Secretariat of Planning of the Presidency of the Republic | Aníbal Teixeira de Souza | 24 March 1987 to 31 March 1987 | Changed its name to Secretariat for Planning and Coordination of the Presidency of the Republic |
| Secretariat for Planning and Coordination of the Presidency of the Republic | Aníbal Teixeira de Souza | 1 May 1987 to 21 January 1988 | |
| Secretariat for Planning and Coordination of the Presidency of the Republic | João Batista de Abreu | 22 January 1988 to 14 March 1990 | |
| Secretariat of Public Administration | Aluísio Alves | 4 September 1986 to 15 February 1989 | Its titular minister was the Minister of State Extraordinary for Administration Affairs (now extinct). |
| Special Secretariat for Science and Technology | Décio Leal de Zagottis | 3 April 1989 to 14 December 1989 | After the creation of the Ministry of Science and Technology, the agency was extinct. |
| National Debureaucratization Program | Paulo de Tarso Lustosa da Costa | 15 March 1985 to 14 February 1986 | The attributions of the National Program of Debureaucratization were transferred to the responsibility of the State Minister Extraordinary for Administration Affairs and to the State Minister of Justice. |
| General Consultancy of the Republic | Darcy Bessone de Oliveira Andrade | 15 March 1985 to 28 August 1985 | |
| General Consultancy of the Republic | Paulo Brossard de Souza Pinto | 28 August 1985 to 14 February 1986 | |
| General Consultancy of the Republic | José Saulo Pereira Ramos | 14 February 1986 to 8 August 1989 | |
| General Consultancy of the Republic | Sebastião Batista Affonso | 6 July 1989 to 28 September 1989 | |
| General Consultancy of the Republic | Clóvis Ferro Costa | 28 September 1989 to 15 March 1990 | |
| National Land Policy Program | Nélson de Figueiredo Ribeiro | 15 March 1985 to 30 April 1985 | The attributions of the National Land Policy Program were transferred to the Ministry of Agrarian Reform and Development. |

== Redemocratization ==
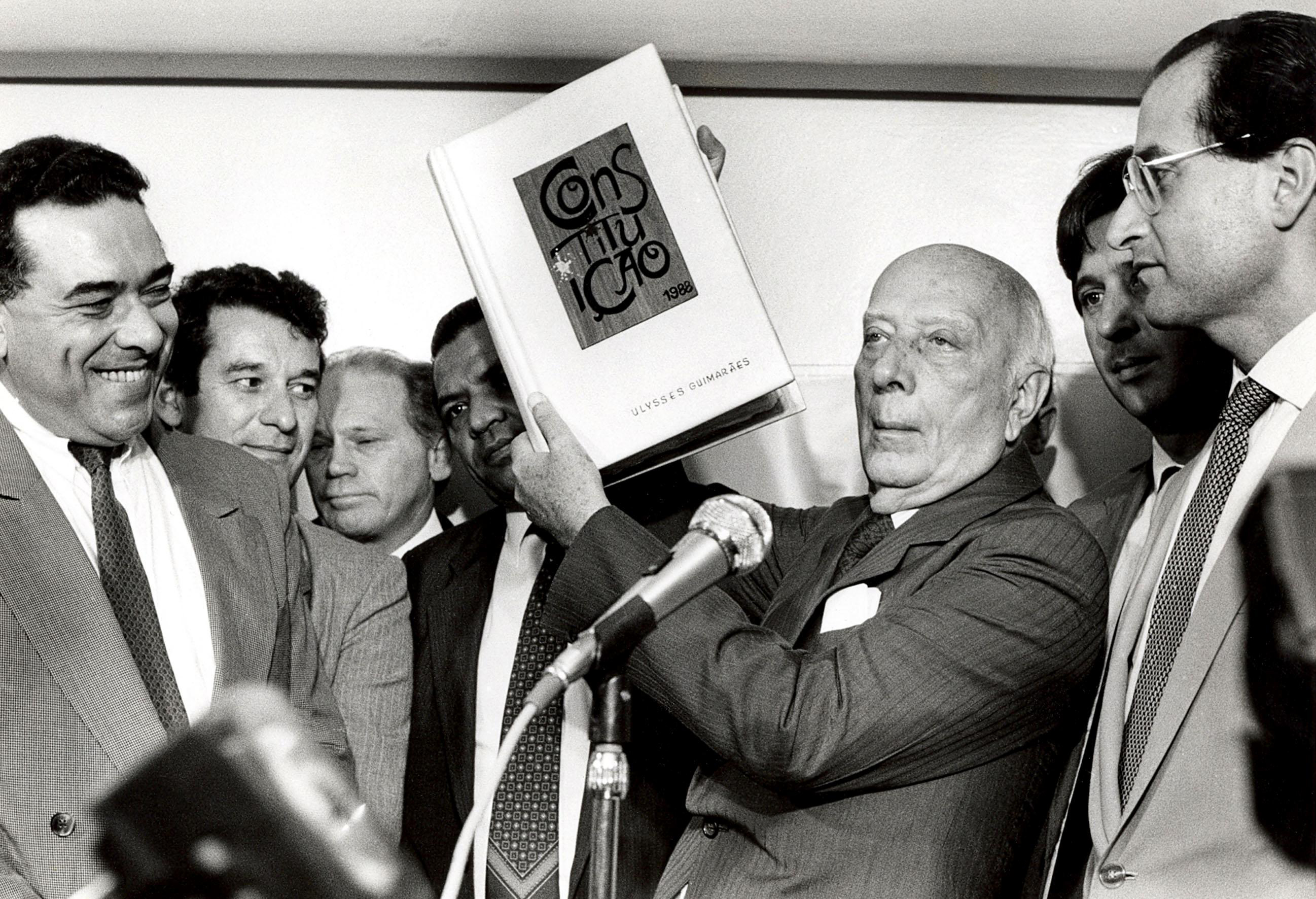
Ulysses Guimarães, president of the Constituent Assembly, holds a copy of the 1988 Constitution

When he took office, Sarney stated that changes would come during the redemocratization process. The first of these came on 8 May 1985, when the constitutional amendment that established direct elections for president, mayor and governor was approved. Illiterate people were given the right to vote for the first time in Brazilian history, and communist parties were legalized.

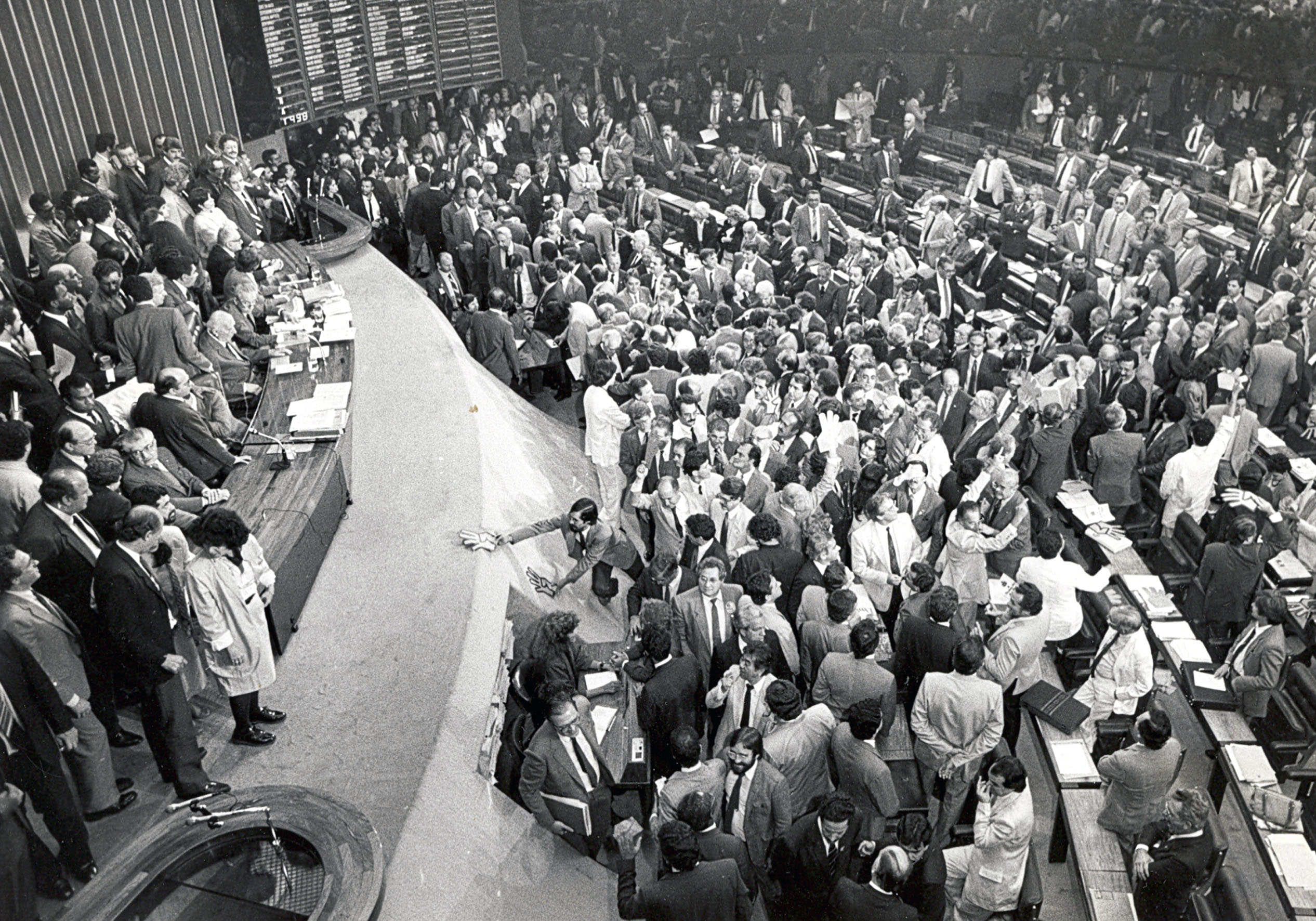
The final working session of the 1988 Constituent Assembly, in which the Constituent Deputies approved the final text of the country's new Constitution, which days later was promulgated in a solemn session

In the process of redemocratization, a new Constitution was needed. This was because the 1967 constitution had been made during the military regime, and thus had a dictatorial character. On 1 February 1987, the Constituent Assembly of 1988 took office, responsible for creating the new constitution. The president of the Assembly was Ulysses Guimarães (PMDB-SP). Most of the Constituent Assembly was formed by the Democratic Center (PMDB, PFL, PTB, PDS and smaller parties), also known as the "Centrão". They were supported by the Executive Branch, represented conservative factions of society, and had a decisive influence on the work of the Constituent Assembly and the outcome of important decisions, such as the maintenance of the agrarian policy and the role of the Armed Forces.

Regardless of the controversies of a political nature, the 1988 Federal Constitution ensured several constitutional guarantees, with the objective of giving greater effectiveness to fundamental rights, allowing the participation of the Judiciary whenever there is injury or threat of injury to rights. To demonstrate the change that was taking place in the Brazilian governmental system, which had recently emerged from an authoritarian regime, the 1988 Constitution qualified torture and armed actions against the democratic state and constitutional order as non-bailable crimes, thus creating constitutional devices to block coups of any nature. Direct elections were determined. According to historian Boris Fausto, the text reflected the pressures of the various groups in society, interested in defining norms that would benefit them.

== Economy ==
Brazil suffered from high inflation and international crises. To try to "unburden the country", the government created several economic plans.

Under the Cruzado Plan, the cruzeiro, the currency in effect at the time, was changed to the cruzado. Salaries were frozen, being readjusted whenever inflation reached 20% (salary trigger). Monetary correction was abolished, and unemployment insurance was created. At first, the plan managed to achieve its goals, reducing unemployment and reducing inflation. The popularity of the plan made the president's party, the PMDB, victorious in the 1985 municipal elections. The party managed to elect 19 of the 25 mayors of the state capitals. The following year, in 1986, the party managed to elect the governors of all states except Sergipe; and in Congress, the party won 261 seats (54%) out of a total of 487 in the Chamber of Deputies, and 45 (62.5%) of the 72 seats in the Federal Senate. However, soon after, the Cruzado Plan began to decay, and the merchants hid their goods in order to use an agio - an additional tax on the product - to be able to sell the products above the established price. After the 1986 elections, the II Cruzado Plan was announced, which caused an excessive increase in prices. The plan failed, and inflation was already over 20%. Finance Minister Dílson Funaro, responsible for the "Cruzado Plans" was replaced by Luís Carlos Bresser-Pereira.

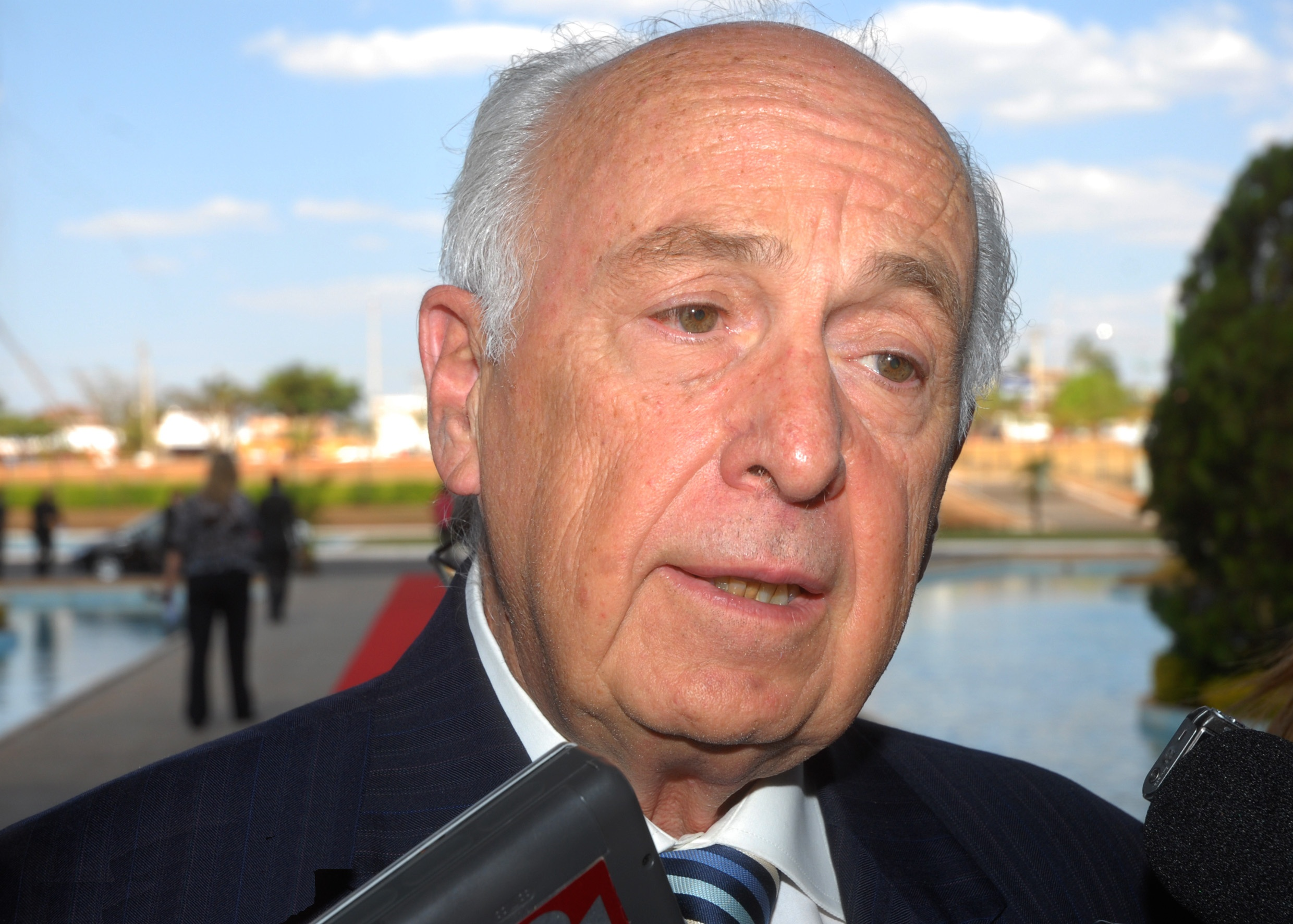
Luís Carlos Bresser-Pereira, responsible for the Bresser Plan

Shortly after Bresser-Pereira took office, inflation reached 23.21%. In order to control the public deficit, through which the government spent more than it collected, an emergency economic plan, the Bresser Plan, was presented in June 1987, instituting a three-month freeze on prices and wages. In order to reduce the public deficit some measures were taken, such as: deactivating the wage trigger, increasing taxes, eliminating the wheat subsidy, and postponing the large projects that were already planned, among them the bullet train between São Paulo and Rio de Janeiro, the North-South Railroad, and the petrochemical complex in Rio de Janeiro. Negotiations with the International Monetary Fund (IMF) were resumed, and the moratorium was suspended. Even with all these measures, inflation reached the alarming rate of 366% in the 12-month period of 1987. Minister Bresser-Pereira resigned from the Ministry of Finance on 6 January 1988, and was replaced by Maílson da Nóbrega.

Minister Maílson da Nóbrega created the Verão Plan in January 1989, which decreed a new price freeze and created a new currency: the Cruzado Novo. Like all the others, this one also failed, and Sarney ended his government in a time of economic recession.

== Foreign policy ==
Sarney assumed the presidency in the last years of the Cold War. In 1986, Sarney resumed relations between Brazil and Cuba, which externally represented the approximation of capitalist countries with socialist ones, and internally, the end of the characteristics of the military dictatorship - it had been the first president of the military dictatorship, Castelo Branco, who broke off relations with Cuba. Due to the economic crises, it was necessary for the government to seek new partnerships. Sarney strengthened relations with African countries that used the Portuguese language.

== Controversies ==
Accusations of endemic corruption in all spheres of government became notorious, with President José Sarney himself being denounced, although the charges were not brought before Congress. It was the period between 1987 and 1989 when the political crisis erupted, allied to the economic crisis. Suspicions of overbilling and irregularities in public bids were cited, such as the bidding for the North-South Railroad.
