= Timeline of Brazilian economic stabilization plans =

The following is a timeline of the Brazilian economic stabilization plans in the "new Republic" (post-military dictatorship) era, a period characterized by intense inflation of the local currency, exceeding 2,700% in the period of 1989 to 1990.

This period was marked by intense economic experimentation (including many forms of economic heterodox shocks) and, as a whole, comprises a unique case study on macroeconomics.

- February 28, 1986: Plano Cruzado (president: José Sarney, finance minister: Dilson Funaro)
- November 21, 1986: Plano Cruzado II (president: José Sarney, finance minister: Dilson Funaro)
- June 12, 1987: Plano Bresser (president: José Sarney, finance minister: Luiz Carlos Bresser-Pereira)
- January 6, 1988: Política Feijão com Arroz (president: José Sarney, finance minister: Maílson da Nóbrega)
- January 15, 1989: Plano Verão (president: José Sarney, finance minister: Maílson da Nóbrega)
- March 15, 1990: Plano Collor, a.k.a. "Plano Brasil Novo" and Plano Collor II (president: Fernando Collor de Mello, finance minister: Zélia Cardoso de Mello)
- July 1, 1994: Plano Real (president: Itamar Franco, finance minister: Fernando Henrique Cardoso)

== See also ==
- List of economic crises in Brazil
- History of Brazil (1985–present)
- Economy of Brazil
- Economic history of Brazil
- Inertial inflation
- Washington consensus
