= Plano Trienal =

The Plano Trienal was a political answer to the inflation rising, that was in 1963 in the percentage of 78.4%, and the deterioration of the external commerce. It was proposed by the Minister of Planning Celso Furtado under João Goulart government.

== Plan guidelines ==
The plan was prepared in three months by a team led by Celso Furtado. The objective of the plan was to return GDP growth to the 7% of previous governments, after the complete failure of João Goulart's initial economic policies. It was a first attempt to start a plan for income distribution. This plan was based on the principle of progressive import substitution, blaming the rise of prices on the structural imbalances of the Brazilian economy, ignoring the effect of the exchange rate on prices.

To reach the dreamed-of performance of 7%, 3.5 trillion "cruzeiros" (the current currency) were allocated for investments at 1962 prices, assuming that this would cause a rise of per capita income from US$323,00 in 1962 to US$363,00 by 1965. There were also expectations for an impossible 70% growth of industry. For both sectoral goals were established of 4.3 million tons of iron slabs by 1965, 190 thousand cars and 270 thousand trucks, and growth of installed capacity and power generation to 7.432.00 kW in 1965.

The objectives conflicted, showing evidence of poor planning: raising taxes while ignoring the effect on private investments, reducing wasteful public expenditures while nevertheless raising salaries, raising money from bank stock without creating any regulatory rule for it, and an attempt to obtain external resources even with hostility growing toward the foreign capital.

== Results ==
The plan was doomed to failure even before the overthrow of the Goulart government, starting by the failure in reaching the 25% as inflation target, and the growing of 0.6% of the GDP in 1963. In 1964, the general inflation was 91.8%.

Despite the failure, the situation the Plano Trienal was formulated, in the short period of time, using non-reliable information and statistics, in the lack of Brazilian experience until then with this kind of plan and the ignorance of the effects of the policies adopted. The Plano Trienal, under this point of view, was important to improve the planning efforts of the country.

The failure of the Plano Trienal created a serious institutional crisis. João Goulart, in a desperate attitude at the end of the plan, began to make use of decrees, trying to nationalize several private oil industries, and expropriate some areas for an alleged land reform, causing anger in the Brazilian medium and high classes, worn by the bad economic conduct, which eventually stimulated the overthrow of the government.

== See also ==
- Timeline of Brazilian economic stabilization plans
- List of economic crises in Brazil
