= Samba effect =

1999 35% drop in the value of the Brazilian real

The samba effect is a nickname for the financial crisis in Brazil in 1999 where there was a 35% drop in the value of the Brazilian real. The effect was caused by the 1997 Asian financial crisis, which led Brazil to increase interest rates and to institute spending cuts and tax increases in an attempt to maintain the value of its currency. These measures failed to produce the intended effect, and the Brazilian government floated its currency against the US dollar, which led to the dramatic decrease in its value. The devaluation also precipitated fears that the ongoing economic crisis in Asia would spread to South America, as many South American countries were heavily dependent on industrial exports from Brazil. These fears resulted in the Brazilian government adopting an austerity program in order to receive a $41.5 billion aid package from the International Monetary Fund and other world lenders.

By the end of 1999, the effect was waning, and the Brazilian economy was beginning to recover. However, unemployment was only slightly lower than before the effect and remained more than twice as high as it was during the late 1980s and early 1990s.

== See also ==
- List of economic crises in Brazil
- Tequila effect
