= Plano Collor =

Brazilian economic reforms, 1990–1992

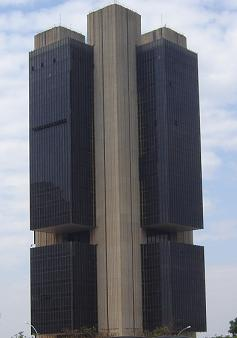
The Brazilian Central Bank, responsible for the implementation of monetary policy in Brazil.

The Collor Plan (Portuguese: Plano Collor) was a collection of economic reforms and inflation-stabilization plans carried out in Brazil during the presidency of Fernando Collor de Mello between 1990 and 1992. The plan was officially called New Brazil Plan (Plano Brasil Novo), but it became closely associated with Collor himself, and "Plano Collor" became its de facto name.

The Collor plan combined fiscal and trade liberalization with radical inflation stabilization measures. The main inflation stabilization was coupled with an industrial and foreign trade reform program, the Industrial and Foreign Trade Policy (Portuguese: Política Industrial e de Comércio Exterior), better known as PICE, and a privatization program dubbed the "National Privatization Program" (Portuguese: Programa Nacional de Desestatização), better known as the PND.

The plan's economic theory had previously been laid out by economists Zelia Cardoso de Mello, Antônio Kandir, Álvaro Zini and Fábio Giambiagi. The actual plan to be implemented was written by Antônio Kandir and economists Ibrahim Eris, Venilton Tadini, Luís Otávio da Motta Veiga, Eduardo Teixeira and João Maia.

The plan was announced on March 16, 1990, one day after Collor's inauguration. Its intended policies included:

- Replacement of the existing currency, the Portuguese: Cruzado Novo, by the Portuguese: Cruzeiro at a parity exchange rate (Cr$1.00 = NCz$1.00),
- Freezing of 80% of private assets for 18 months (receiving the prevailing rate of inflation plus 6% in interest while frozen),
- An extremely high tax on all financial transactions,
- Indexation of taxes,
- Elimination of most fiscal incentives,
- Increase in the prices charged by public utilities,
- The adoption of a floating exchange rate,
- Gradual economic opening to foreign competition,
- Temporary freeze on wages and prices,
- The extinction of several government agencies, with plans for a reduction of over 300,000 government employees,
- Stimulus of privatization and the beginning of economic deregulation.

== Inflation stabilization plans ==
Three separate plans to stabilize inflation were carried out during Collor's two years in power. The first two, Collor Plans I and II, were headed by the finance minister, Zélia Cardoso de Mello. In May 1991, Zélia was replaced by Marcílio Marques Moreira, who carried out an eponymous plan, the Marcílio Plan (Plano Marcílio).

=== Collor Plan I ===
Brazil had suffered through several years of hyperinflation: in 1989, the year before Collor took office, average monthly inflation was 28.94%. The Collor Plan sought to stabilize inflation by "freezing" government liability (such as internal debt) and restricting money flow in order to halt inertial inflation.

The freeze caused a strong reduction in trade and output of industry. With the reduction in the money supply from 30% to 9% of GDP, the rate of inflation dropped from 81% in March to 9% in June. The government faced two choices: they could either hold the freeze, and risk a recession brought about by the reduction of economic activity, or re-monetize the economy by "unfreezing" money flow and risk the return of inflation.

Rapid, uncontrolled re-monetization of the economy had been named as the cause the failure of the previous economic stabilization plans in controlling inflation. The Collor government would have to "throttle" the re-monetization in order to keep inflation down. To do so, it could utilize a wide combination of economic tools to affect the speed of re-monetization, such as taxes, exchange rates, money flow, credit and interest rates.

For the next few months after the plan was implemented inflation continued on an upward trend. By January 1991, nine months after the plan began, it had climbed back to 20% a month.

The failure of the Plano Collor I in controlling inflation is credited by both Keynesian and monetarist economists to the Collor government's failure to control the re-monetization of the economy. The government had opened several "loopholes" which contributed to the increase of the money flow: Taxes and other government bills issued prior to the freeze could be paid with the old cruzado, creating a form of "liquidity loophole" which was fully exploited by the private sector. A number of individual exceptions to individual sectors of the economy were opened by the government, such as retirees' savings and "special financing" for the government payroll. As the government issued more and more exceptions granting liquidity, these were later dubbed 'little faucets' (torneirinhas).

According to Carlos Eduardo Carvalho, from Departamento de Economia da Pontifícia Universidade Católica de São Paulo:

The Collor Plan itself began to be formatted by the president-elects advisors at the end of December 1989, after his victory in the runoff election. The final draft was probably strongly influenced by a document discussed by the advisors of PMDB party candidate Ulysses Guimarães, and later by advisors of PT party candidate Luiz Inácio Lula da Silva, during the period between the general election and the runoff. In spite of the differences in their general economic strategies, these competing candidates failed to develop their own stabilization policies at a time of rapid price increases and risk of hyperinflation during the second half of 1989. The proposal to block liquidity originated in academic debate and was imposed upon the main presidential candidacies.

Ultimately, the government was unable to reduce spending, reducing its ability to use many of the aforementioned tools. Reasons ranged from an increased share of the federal tax revenue to be shared with the individual states to a "job stability" clause for government employees in the 1988 Brazilian Constitution which prevented the size reduction as announced at the start of the plan. This vindicated economists such as Luiz Carlos Bresser-Pereira and Mário Henrique Simonsen, both former finance ministers, who had predicted at the start of the plan that the government's fiscal situation would make it impossible for the plan to work.

=== Collor Plan II ===
The second Collor Plan took place in January 1991. It included a new freezing of prices and the replacement of the overnight rate with new financial instruments which included in its yield calculation the anticipated rates of both private and federal papers.

The plan managed to produce only a short-term drop in inflation, and it began to climb again in May 1991.

=== Marcílio Plan ===
On May 10, 1991, Zélia was replaced as finance minister by Marcílio Marques Moreira, a Georgetown-educated economist who was at the time of his nomination the Brazilian ambassador to the United States.

Marcílio's plan was considered more gradual than its predecessors, utilizing a combination of high interest rates and a restrictive fiscal policy. At the same time, prices were liberalized and, working along with Pedro Malan, a US$2 billion loan from the International Monetary Fund secured to shore up internal currency reserves.

Inflation rates during the Marcílio Plan remained at hyperinflationary levels. Marcílio left the finance ministry to his successor, Gustavo Krause, on October 2, 1992. President Fernando Collor de Mello had been impeached by congress four days earlier, on September 28, 1992, over charges of corruption in an influence-peddling scheme, marking the end of his government's attempts at ending hyperinflation.

Between the end of the Marcílio Plan and the beginning of the next "named" plan, the Plano Real, inflation continued to grow, reaching 48% in June 1994.

== Industrial and Foreign Trade Policy (PICE) ==
Running along in parallel with the Collor Plan was the PICE, a program which aimed to both raise real wages and promote economic openness and trade liberalization.

Selected policies included the gradual reduction of tariffs (with the selective protection of certain key industries), an export financing mechanism through the creation of a Foreign Trade Bank (similar to the American Ex-Im Bank), reduction in customs duties, implementation of anti-dumping mechanisms and the use of government-generated demand for high-tech sectors.

On paper, the PICE had seemingly contradictory goals: to stimulate the entry of foreign companies while increasing local innovation.

Later studies by the Institute of Applied Economic Research (IPEA), an independent government think tank, argued that the policy seemed to have produced that very contradictory effect: local production saw improvements in quality and productivity in face of foreign competition, but it simultaneously curbed domestic innovation due to unrestricted competition from imported technology.

== National Privatization Program (PND) ==
While previous privatizations had been conducted by the government in the 1980s, at time of Collor's inauguration, no large-scale privatization program had been attempted. Sixty-eight different companies were added to the PND and slated for privatization. Unlike traditional privatization programs, which sought to finance a government's deficit, the PND had a stated goal of providing the government with the means with which they could purchase back the public debt. Government bonds were used in large quantities as currency to pay for privatized companies.

Altogether, some 18 companies worth US$4 billion were privatized between 1990 and 1992, mostly in the steel, fertilizer and petrochemical sectors. The PND also ended several government monopolies whose possible negative social impact was expected to be countered by the increased competition. This increased competition, resulting from the aforementioned PICE policies, was thought to reduce the chance of the emergence of oligopolies.

== See also ==
- Timeline of Brazilian economic stabilization plans
- List of economic crises in Brazil
