= Hyperinflation in Brazil =

Period of hyperinflation from 1986–1994

- Part of the Economy of Brazil
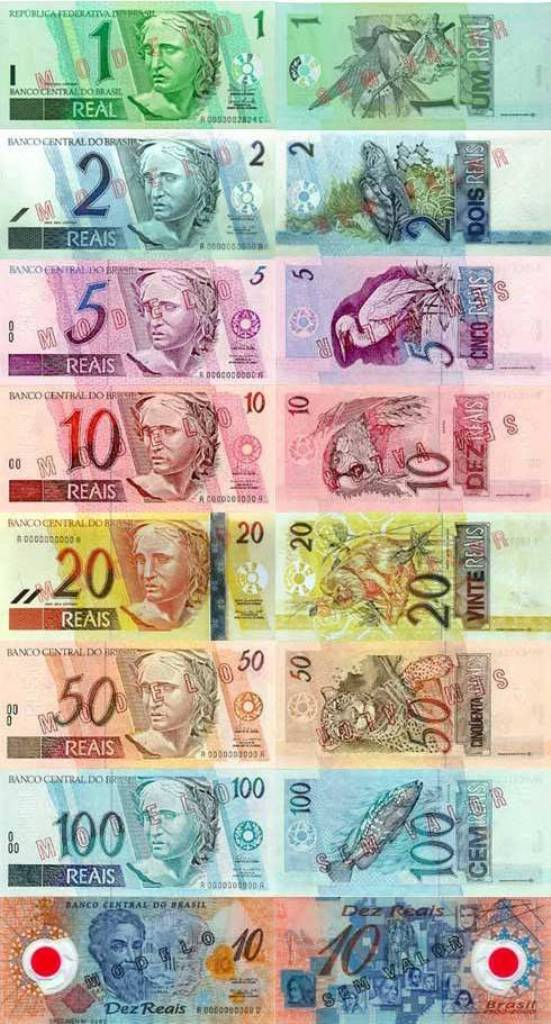
- The new Brazilian currency, the real, was introduced in 1994 as part of the Plano Real to manage hyperinflation.
- Date: 1986–1 July 1994
- Location: Brazil
- Cause: Largely endogenous economy, high external public debt, acceptance of high inflation, currency substitute

Hyperinflation in Brazil occurred between the first three months of 1990. The monthly inflation rates between January and March 1990 were 71.9%, 71.7% and 81.3% respectively. As accepted by the International Monetary Fund (IMF), hyperinflation is defined as a period of time in which the average price level of goods and services rise by more than 50% a month.

Brazil experienced over a decade of very high inflation – often double-digit monthly inflation – preceding the hyperinflationary period. The nation sustained hyperinflation for less than half a year. This economic event was the culmination of a number of structural aspects of the Brazilian economy including, but not exclusive to, limited foreign trade and high external public debt as well as unsuccessful preventive measures.

The Brazilian government responded to hyperinflation by using multiple periods of price freezes to artificially stop inflation. This was effective in managing hyperinflation for a few months. In July 1990, price controls were lifted and hyperinflation returned.

The period of hyperinflation was resolved after the implementation of the Plano Real (1994). The Brazilian economy had limited financial resources to support an expensive expansionary fiscal policy. The Plano Real involved anchoring the economy to a separate unit of account, the Unidade Real de Valor (URV), instead of the currency, the cruzeiro. The function of payment was then transferred to the URV which became the real. The separation and reintegration of the function of money was successful in limiting inflation in the short- and long-term.

== Historical context ==
=== 1960s ===
In the 1960s, Brazil had adopted a method of indexation which involved the setting of monthly or weekly domestic prices for certain investments to slightly hedge inflation. This offered real term financial remuneration that was both secure and liquefiable. This method also demanded economic foresight and the cooperation of both private and public institutions. It relied on the wide acceptance and trust of all economic agents to ensure that these indices were adopted. The breakdown of indexation stemmed from public uncertainty and a mistrust of government.

=== 1987 ===
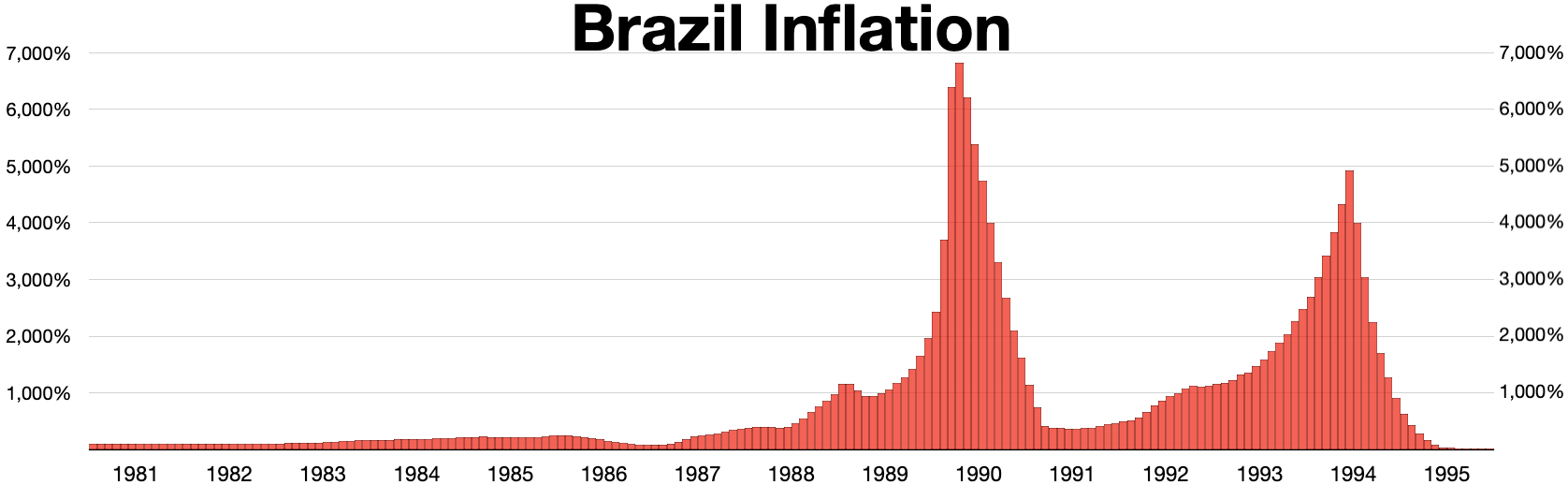
Brazil Inflation 1981-1995

Despite the rising inflation rates, Brazil’s private sector saw a strengthening in their balance sheets as the market for private, traded financial assets grew with the introduction of Treasury bills. This was accompanied by an increase in the complexity of financial instruments and technology and advancing expertise in the financial sector.

=== 1989 ===
The hyperinflationary period starting in January 1990 directly followed the 1989 Brazilian election, the first direct presidential election held since 1960. The lasting effects of the military dictatorship could be seen in the new democratic government’s will, yet inability, to effectively halt high inflation. Only after the hyperinflationary period were aggressive emergency measures taken.

== Inflation rate ==
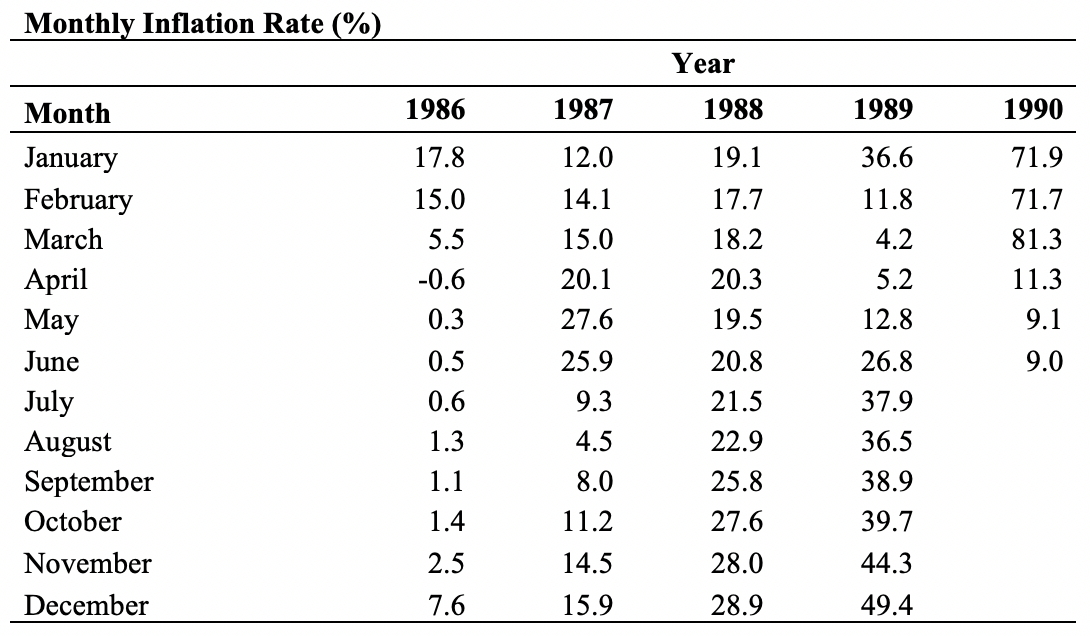
Brazil Monthly Inflation Rate 1986-1990.

Brazil observed consistently high inflation in the three years leading up to January 1990. Sustaining double-digit monthly inflation from January 1987 to April 1990, the short periods of single-digit monthly inflation can be attributed to the implementation of different inflation-management plans. Inflation during July 1987 to September 1987 of 9.3%, 4.5% and 8.0% respectively was the result of the implementation of the Bresser Plan in June 1987. The inflation rates of 4.2% and 5.2% in March and April 1989 were a result of the Summer Plan implemented in January 1989.

== Causes ==
=== Background ===
Hyperinflation forces the institution of money to become excessively fluid and unstable. Money is a contributing factor for the hyperinflation experienced by Brazil as well as the nation’s ability to recover through the separation and eventual reintegration of its two functions.

==== Inflation theory ====
In the 1980s, a new inflation theory became popularised in Brazil. This was the idea of inertial inflation which aimed to explain the differing reasons behind the acceleration and maintenance of inflation. Inertial inflation is founded on the idea of distributive conflict which states that an economic agent will use the price mechanism to retain or improve their market share.

The new theory suggests that inflation should begin at a chosen base time period. Analysts seek to explain what led to the given level of inflation and the proceeding changes, accounting for both acceleration and maintenance. Distributive conflict points to the maintenance of inflation as due to a lack of coordination between different economic agents.

=== Largely endogenous economy ===
Brazil’s lack of trade exposes the economy to heightened vulnerability to internal price shocks. A strong reliance on domestic supply means that prices are more volatile and likely to be inflated, such as increased food prices caused by weather-related shocks. The more open trade of durable goods has meant a lower level of inflation in this industry compared to average inflation of consumer goods.

=== High external public debt ===
The economist Pereira states that the asymmetrical balance sheet of the public sector may have been a causal factor for Brazil’s hyperinflation as high external public debt can be indirectly linked to inflationary pressures. The government imposed higher taxation to service this large external debt (principal and interest) which was then offset by higher prices set by producers which facilitated inflation. The large fiscal burden to service foreign debt could not be covered by tax receipts. The process of deterioration in the fiscal accounts represented a major structural issue in the economy which the Brazilian government sought to resolve multiple times through different measures.

=== Acceptance of high inflation ===
The Brazilian economy historically accepted high inflation rates. This high inflation was exacerbated by an unstable balance sheet which spiralled into hyperinflation.

=== Currency substitute ===
Brazil used a reliable domestic currency substitute which functioned as liquidity in the economy. The expansive growth of this alternative imitated the effects of an oversupply of money. An excess money supply leads to high inflation and in more extreme cases, hyperinflation.

== Methods of control ==
=== Failed preventive measures ===
Brazil adopted multiple stabilisation policies, many based on income policies, to manage high inflation and prevent hyperinflation. The cycling between stabilisation and destabilisation set the foundation for hyperinflation as each new cycle saw a shorter period of low inflation followed by a higher inflation peak.

==== Cruzado Plan (1986) ====
Introduced on 28 February 1986, the objective of the Cruzado Plan was to achieve a rate of zero inflation. The plan functioned under the rationale that inflation was inertial and caused by structural issues such as wage indexation and systemic marked-up pricing. Wages were effectively frozen for a year as the government re-introduced a system of indexation. Wages were later adjusted by the granting of bonuses. The plan dismantled many formal indexing mechanisms of financial assets in the Brazilian economy and was supported by monetary reform. Economist Pereira suggests that the old currency (the cruzeiro) was replaced by a new currency (the cruzado) to inspire confidence in the domestic economy and reduce inflationary pressures resulting from a weak currency.

The Cruzado Plan was successful until late 1986. The plan resulted in a deep economic crisis as increased wages yet frozen prices stimulated a wage-price spiral of demand-induced inflation. The government budgetary deficit worsened as state-run enterprises had not corrected their prices to reflect future demand prior to the freeze. Real return to government debt was distorted and caused Brazil to experience capital flight for the first time in their stabilisation policies. Internal debt interest rates increased due to a fear of repudiation and contributed to the spiral into hyperinflation.

==== Bresser Plan (1987) ====
The Bresser Plan, implemented on 12 June 1987, aimed to improve the healthy functioning of the economy by reducing inflation to a manageable level rather than to eliminate inflation. The 3-month plan was a policy response to a financial emergency and aimed to overcome an acute crisis by completing the indexation system that the Cruzado Plan had legally interdicted. The Bresser Plan was a heterodox shock involving price freezes, however this time consumers and producers were aware of future price freezes.

The plan began to collapse in the latter quarter of 1987 and was predominantly due to the significant raises government staff were given.

==== Summer Plan (1989) ====
On 15 January 1989 the four- to eight-week Summer Plan was realized. It focused on limiting inflation and reducing government deficit. The plan aimed to achieve the first objective through more price and wage freezes and the introduction of a new currency (the cruzado novo). The plan proposed the retrenching of 90,000 government employees and closure of some state enterprises to reduce the budget deficit. Amidst strong protestation and resistance, the latter proposition was modified, and the deficit continued.

=== Response to hyperinflation ===
==== Collor Plan (1990) ====
Introduced on 16 March 1990, the tripartite Collor Plan similarly adopted a price freeze. All prices were frozen at the 12 March 1990 level to be later adjusted by the government according to future inflation expectations. The plan involved a reduction in the stock of money through freezing bank accounts and restricting financial markets. The plan effectively froze 80% of all liquidity. A 29% monthly increase in money supply was used to reliquefy the economy and the reintroduction of a new currency (the cruzeiro).

The government sought to eliminate the budget deficit and achieve a surplus in the operational and primary balances. The government imposed taxes, increased the prices of goods produced by the state, cut the majority of subsidies, dismissed 50,000 federal employees and privatised public sector enterprises.

This plan succeeded in managing the hyperinflation by reducing monthly inflation from 81.3% in March 1990 to 11.3% in April 1990 (Pereira & Nakano, 1991, p. 44). In July 1990 when price controls were lifted, Brazil saw the re-emergence of high inflation.

=== Avoiding re-emergence of hyperinflation ===
==== Plano Real (1994) ====
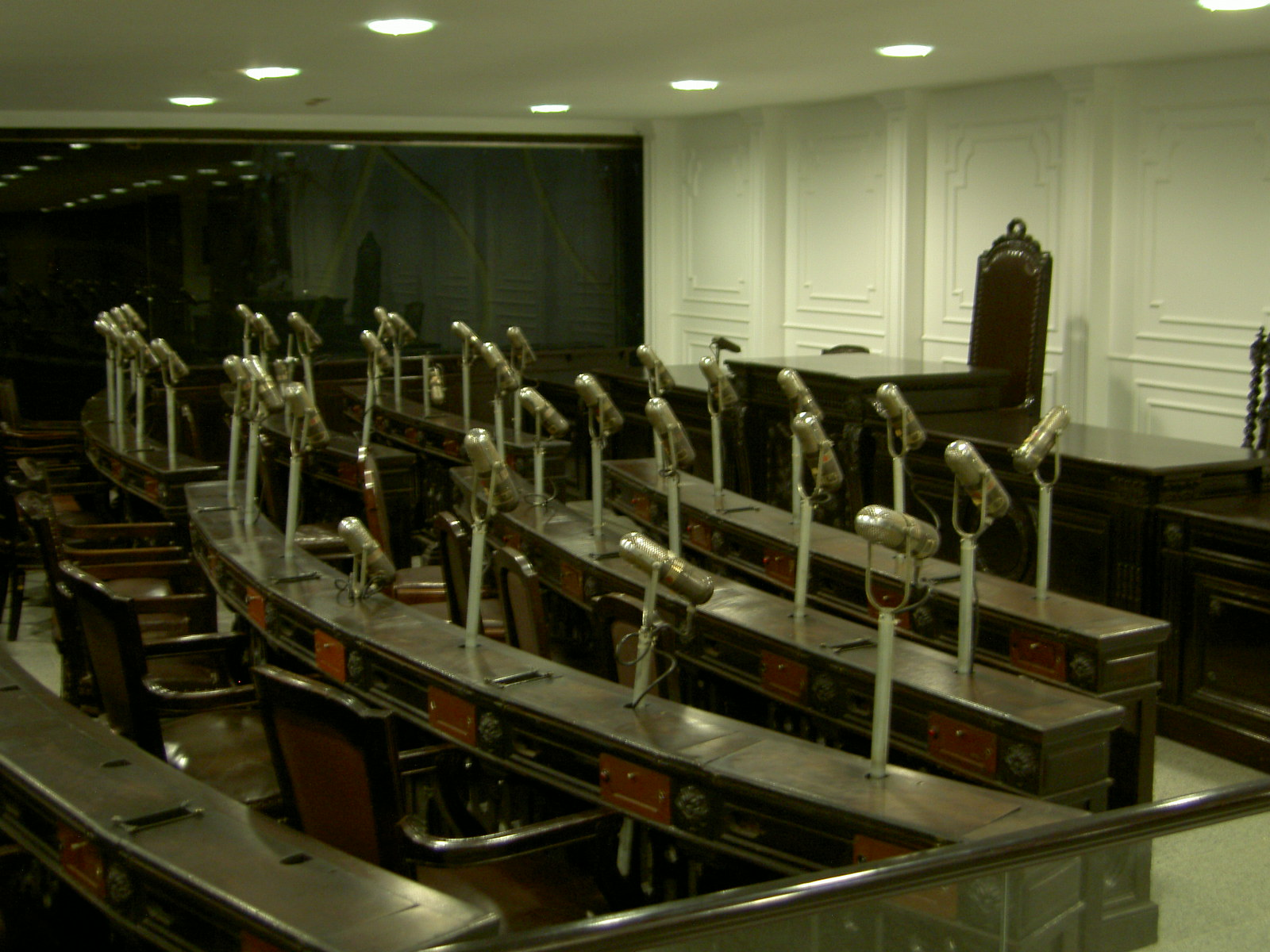
Brazilian parliament in the 1960s

The Plano Real involved anchoring the economy to a separate, distinct unit of account to reflect relative prices as the currency had lost this function. Economic agents followed a new index, the Unidade Real de Valor (URV), which was established between February and June 1994, and adjusted daily. Incentives were given to encourage the transformation of old contracts to be rewritten in new URV terms. The Plano Real was the subject of open discussion in Parliament weeks before its implementation. This allowed both the consideration of different perspectives as well as informing all economic agents about the plan before it was executed. Account and payment function were completely separated, with the cruzeiro used as a unit of payment and the URV a unit of account. On July 1, 1994, the function of payment was transferred to the URV which became the real, replacing the cruzeiro. This plan was successful, and Brazil has been able to sustain single-digit inflation ever since.

The Plano Real was successful in limiting rates of inflation, seen in the significant reduction in monthly inflation in 1994, from 48% in June, to 7.8% in July, to 1.9% in August. The long-term success of this plan hinged on its ability to mitigate external economic shocks without spiralling into high inflation again. This was briefly tested in January 1999, when a foreign exchange crisis caused a 35% devaluation of the currency. The annual inflation rate remained low at 8%.

== See also ==
- List of economic crises in Brazil
- Hyperinflation in Venezuela
- La Década Perdida
- Inflation indexes in Brazil
