= Marcílio Marques Moreira =

Brazilian Minister of Finance

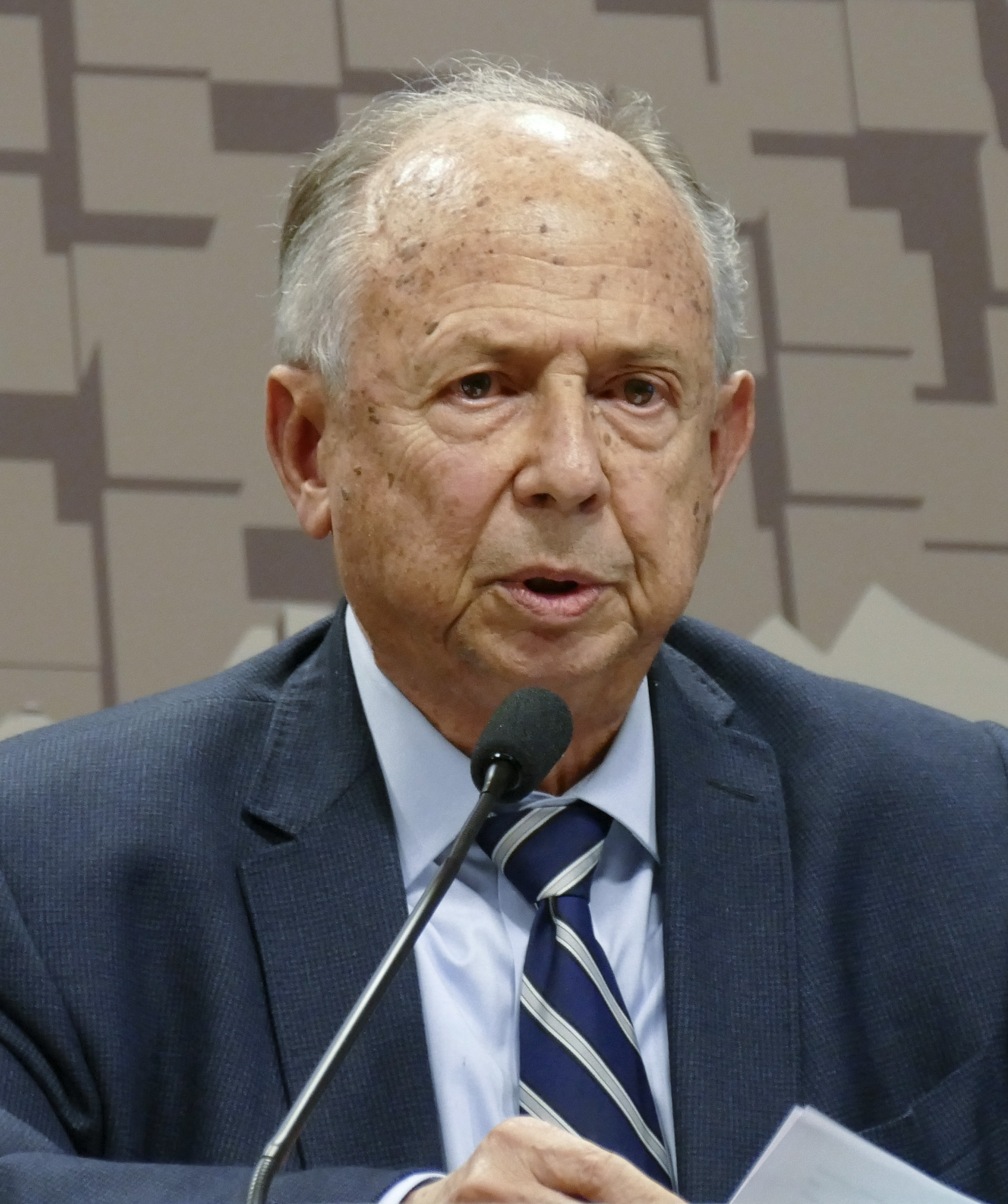

Minister of Economy, Finance and Planning
- In office May 10, 1991 – October 2, 1992
- President: Fernando Collor de Mello
- Preceded by: Zélia Cardoso de Mello
- Succeeded by: Gustavo Krause

Ambassador of Brazil to the United States
- In office November 23, 1986 – May 9, 1991
- Nominated by: José Sarney
- Preceded by: Sérgio Corrêa da Costa
- Succeeded by: Rubens Ricupero

Personal details
- Born: November 25, 1931 (age 94) Rio de Janeiro, Federal District, Brazil
- Education: Rio de Janeiro State University (LLB); Georgetown University (MS)
- Occupation: Economist, diplomat, politician, university professor

Marcílio Marques Moreira (born in Rio de Janeiro, November 25, 1931), was the Brazilian Minister of Finance during the government of Fernando Collor de Mello, responsible for overseeing the Plano Collor. He was also the Brazilian ambassador to the United States in 1986.

He is now Principal at the Conjuntura e Contexto consultancy firm, a member of the boards of the Brazilian division of the American Bank Note Company and ENERGISA, chairman of the advisory board of the institute on the Ethics of Corporate Competition, and vice-chairman of the Board of INAE – Forum Nacio.

He taught at the Pontifical Catholic University of Rio de Janeiro.

== Bibliography ==
- Marcílio Marques Moreira (1 May 1986). The Brazilian quandary. Priority Press Publications. ISBN 978-0-87078-171-1.
- Marcílio Marques Moreira (2000). The international financial system: a new architecture?. IPEA, Diretoria de Estudos Macroeconômicos.

Diplomatic posts
Preceded by Sérgio Corrêa da Costa	Ambassador of Brazil to the United States; 1986–1991	Succeeded by Rubens Ricupero
Political offices
Preceded by Zélia Cardoso de Mello	Minister of Economy, Finance and Planning; 1991–1992	Succeeded by Gustavo Krause
