= Maílson da Nóbrega =

Brazilian economist (born 1942)

Maílson Ferreira da Nóbrega
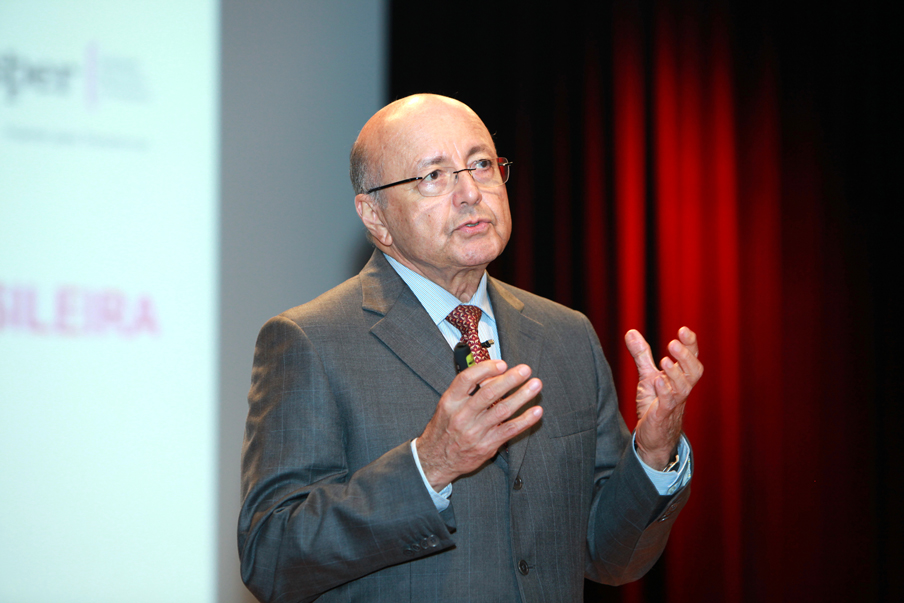

Minister of Finances
- In office January 6, 1988 – March 15, 1990
- President: José Sarney
- Preceded by: Luiz Carlos Bresser-Pereira
- Succeeded by: Zélia Cardoso de Mello

Personal details
- Born: May 14, 1942 (age 84) Cruz do Espírito Santo, Paraíba, Brazil
- Spouse: Rosa Dalcin
- Children: 5
- Education: Centro de Ensino Universitário de Brasília
- Profession: Economist
- Website: Maílson da Nóbrega - Personal page

Maílson Ferreira da Nóbrega (Cruz do Espírito Santo, Paraíba, May 14, 1942) is a Brazilian economist. He was Finance minister in José Sarney's administration during a period of hyperinflation in the late 1980s. He is married and has five children.

== Career ==
Nóbrega was an officer of the Bank of Brazil since 1963; he graduated in economics in 1974 at the "Centro de Ensino Universitário de Brasília" (CEUB). In the late 1970s, he began a career in the Ministry of Finance; after holding several important positions, he was appointed Minister of Finance on January 6, 1988, after the resignation of Luiz Carlos Bresser-Pereira.

=== In the Ministry of Finance ===
Upon taking office, Nóbrega said that he would not neglect inflation control, that there would be no economic package or "heroic measures" and that he would try to renegotiate Brazil's external debt with international creditors on terms as favorable as those obtained by Mexico. However, it quickly became apparent that he would not be able to fulfill any of these promises. On February 2, 1988, the then-Senator Fernando Henrique Cardoso in Congress questioned the resumption of external debt payments since the default of 1987, without a definitive agreement signed with creditors. Finally, on August 23, 1988, Brazil reached an agreement with the IMF, for which it would get an injection of US$1.4 billion; of which it has actually received $477 million.

Nóbrega had said that his economic policy would be "rice and beans", without "miracle cures", only making occasional adjustments to prevent hyperinflation. However, 1987 ended with a cumulative inflation rate of 415.87%, and it reached 1037.53% at the end of 1988. It became clear that once again the Sarney administration would have to resort to a "heterodox economic package." This package, which was named Plano Verão ("Summer Plan"), was implemented on January 15, 1989.

==== Summer Plan ====
The economic package known as "Summer Plan" was the fourth and last of the Sarney administration, and was primarily aimed at controlling rising inflation in an election year. For this purpose, a new currency, the cruzado novo—equivalent to 1,000 old cruzados—was created. There was a 17% devaluation of the national currency against the United States dollar, and prices and wages were frozen. Like its predecessors, the Summer Plan proved to be an almost complete failure. Maílson da Nóbrega said that its goals were not met, but that other measures that should be adopted for the plan to succeed were not approved by the Brazilian Congress. Among these measures were the dismissal of civil servants without stability, the closure of public agencies and an extensive program of privatization. These measures were taken later in the neoliberal governments of Fernando Collor de Mello and Fernando Henrique Cardoso, although they have not proven particularly effective in reducing the public deficit.

Apart from its ineffectualness as a tool to control inflation, it is alleged that the Summer Plan and related "Bresser Plan", 1987, "Collor Plan 1", 1990 and "Collor 2", 1991 caused losses to those with savings accounts, as the inflation adjustment indices were altered. For the Summer Plan, the losses are estimated at 20.37% of revenues in February 1989. However, the National Confederation of Brazilian Financial System challenges the idea that savers were negatively affected, but says that financial institutions did not receive the money not credited to customers' accounts, since the excess liquidity is compulsorily collected by the Central Bank of Brazil. As of 2013, it is expected that the Brazilian Supreme Court (STF) will evaluate the case and establish whether there were losses and who will pay for them.

== Consultancy ==
In 1989, Brazil's hyperinflation reached the historic milestone of 1782.85%. In March 1990, the elected president, Fernando Collor de Mello, took the oath for the new Finance minister, Zélia Cardoso de Mello. Shortly after leaving office, Maílson da Nóbrega moved to São Paulo, where he began almost immediately to work as a financial consultant. With Claudio Adilson Gonçalez—his former subordinate—and Celso Luiz Martone, he formed the "MCM Consultores Associados", to which he belonged until 1995.

In 1997, Nóbrega began structuring the management consulting company "Tendências Consultoria Integrada", along with Nathan Blanche and Gustavo Loyola—a former Central Bank of Brazil governor and former partner of the MCM. Their experience in public finance made "Tendências" (along with MCM) become one of Brazil's main economic consulting services, whose clients include major players of the financial market and financial institutions operating in high-risk speculative investments known informally as "black belt funds". In January 1999, based on reports by "Tendências" and MCM—which had expected a devaluation of the real in February—the "black belts" Marka and FonteCindam went bankrupt, even though they had received a substantial aid package from the Central Bank, chaired by Francisco Lopes.

In what has become one of the biggest financial scandals of Fernando Henrique Cardoso's administration, it was shown that the presence of former financial authorities in a consultancy was no guarantee of profits. However, the Marka/FonteCindam case has not affected the prestige of Nóbrega or of his consultancy. Columnist of the journal "Folha de S. Paulo" since 1998, in 2000 he moved to the "O Estado de S. Paulo", and from 2005 he began to write fortnightly for weekly magazine "Veja". In 2012, while still being a "Tendências" partner and one of the most requested Brazilian panelists—about 90 presentations a year, especially in the analysis of the political and economic situation—Nóbrega was also on the board of directors of seven companies in Brazil and abroad—including Grendene, TIM, Rodobens and Cosan.

== The movie ==
In 2013, the documentary O Brasil Deu Certo. E Agora? ("Brazil has succeeded. What now?") directed by Louise Sottomaior was released. Conceived by Maílson da Nóbrega, the movie deals with the achievement of political and economic stability in Brazil and the challenges facing the country's growth. the documentary featured the testimony of three former presidents of Brazil—Sarney, Collor and FHC—seven former Central Bank presidents and 13 former ministers. The film was not attended by former president Lula da Silva, the current president, Dilma Rousseff, former Finance Minister Antonio Palocci or the incumbent, Guido Mantega. According to Maílson, all were invited but chose not to participate.

== Controversies ==
=== Nóbrega and the "Citizen Kane" ===
In his autobiography, Além do Feijão com Arroz ("Beyond Rice and Beans"), Maílson da Nobrega reports that his appointment as Finance Minister had the approval of the powerful telecommunications tycoon Roberto Marinho (which Nóbrega compares to William Randolph Hearst, or more precisely, to "Citizen Kane"). President Sarney oriented Nóbrega to speak first with "Dr. Roberto" in his office in Brasília. The conversation, which Nóbrega describes as a "confirmation hearing" was held on the afternoon of January 5, 1988. Marinho appears to have been satisfied with what he heard, because at the return to the ministry, about 18 pm (10 minutes after leaving the office of the Rede Globo), Nóbrega was greeted by his secretary, who had heard in the breaking news of the Jornal Nacional that he had been confirmed as Minister of Finance. He then received a call from Sarney, summoning him to the Planalto Palace to assume office.

After the inauguration, Nóbrega and Marinho met for lunch, this time in Rio de Janeiro, at the headquarters of TV Globo. Marinho had confided to Nóbrega that he had indicated two others Ministers of Sarney: Antônio Carlos Magalhães, for Communications and Leonidas Pires, for the Army Ministry. According Nóbrega, "I don't know if it was true or just a demonstration of power."

Although it had begun in a cordial manner, the relationship between Marinho and Nóbrega became tense in the following months. The first problem was the cancellation of a government program to promote exports, in which Roberto Marinho wanted to sell one billion dollars in prefabricated houses. The program was canceled, but the interest of Marinho ended up being published by the "Jornal do Brasil", "O Globo"'s (Marinho's family newspaper) main competitor in Rio de Janeiro. Displeased, Roberto Marinho, pressed President Sarney to make Nóbrega to deny the information. Even after Nóbrega refused to give a formal denial, was said in Jornal Nacional, the main news program of TV Globo, that the information had been denied.

With the escalation of hyperinflation, the pressure against Nóbrega increased. He found himself "fired" by the newspaper "O Globo" on the morning of August 4, 1989 ("Inflation overthrows Maílson", said the headline), and the next day the newspaper declared that the President Sarney would choose a new coordinator for the economy. But nothing of this happened, and Nóbrega remained minister until March 18, 1990, when Zélia Cardoso de Mello assumed the Ministry of Finance. According to the magazine "Veja" in its edition #1091 (August 9, 1989), the action to precipitate the fall of Nóbrega was organized in Brasília by the businessman and lobbyist Jorge Serpa, a Roberto Marinho's proxy. Serpa was the same that in 1988 had tried - unsuccessfully - to mediate the billion dollar agreement in manufactured homes proposed by "Dr. Roberto".

=== Nóbrega vs. ISTOÉ ===
On April 28, 1999, with the scandal Marka/FonteCindam in the spotlight, the news magazine "ISTOÉ" published an editorial, Moralização Já! ("Moralisation Now!"), which criticized the "promiscuous" relationship between the financial market and the public power, evidenced by the fact that monetary authorities went to work as consultants immediately after leaving the government—or vice versa—and Maílson da Nobrega was specifically cited as an example. In consequence, based on the Brazilian press law, Nóbrega filed a lawsuit against ISTOÉ, seeking clarification on the conclusions made in the editorial.

The explanations were printed in edition #1554 of the magazine, dated July 14, 1999. In them, the editor of "ISTOÉ", Domingo Alzugaray clarified that both Maílson da Nobrega and his partner Gustavo Loyola had highlighted the experience in public organs in their own curricula, but there was no suggestion that they had passed inside information to the mentioned banks—so much so that they went bankrupt.

== Published works ==
- — (2000). O Brasil em Transformação (in Portuguese). Infinito. p. 324. ISBN 9788573122893.
- — (2005). O futuro chegou: instituições e desenvolvimento no Brasil (in Portuguese). Globo. p. 399. ISBN 9788525040916.
- —; Z. Sottomaior, Louise (2010). Além do feijão com arroz (in Portuguese). Rio de Janeiro: Civilização Brasileira. p. 602. ISBN 9788520010501.

== See also ==
- Beyond Citizen Kane

Political offices
Preceded by Luiz Carlos Bresser-Pereira	Minister of Finances; 1988–1990	Succeeded by Zélia Cardoso de Mello
