= Vicente Fialho =

Brazilian engineer and politician (1938–2022)

Member of the Chamber of Deputies of Brazil
- In office 1 February 1991 – 1 February 1995

Minister of Mines and Energy
- In office 17 January 1989 – 15 March 1990
- Preceded by: Iris Rezende (acting)
- Succeeded by: Marcus Vinícius Pratini de Moraes

Mayor of Fortaleza
- In office 1 January 1971 – 1 January 1975
- Preceded by: José Walter Cavalcante
- Succeeded by: Evandro Aires de Moura

Mayor of São Luís
- In office 1 January 1969 – 1 January 1971
- Preceded by: Epitácio Cafeteira
- Succeeded by: Roberto Macieira

Personal details
- Born: Vicente Cavalcante Fialho; 27 January 1938; Tauá, Brazil
- Died: 12 July 2022 (aged 84); Fortaleza, Brazil
- Political party: PFL
- Education: Federal University of Ceará; Federal University of Rio de Janeiro
- Occupation: Engineer

Vicente Cavalcante Fialho (27 January 1938 – 12 July 2022) was a Brazilian engineer and politician. A member of the Liberal Front Party, he served as mayor of Fortaleza from 1971 to 1975 and served in the Chamber of Deputies from 1991 to 1995.

He was also appointed to serve as the Minister of Mines and Energy in 1990.

Fialho died of COVID-19 in Fortaleza on 12 July 2022, at the age of 84.
