= Zélia Cardoso de Mello =

Brazilian politician (born 1953)

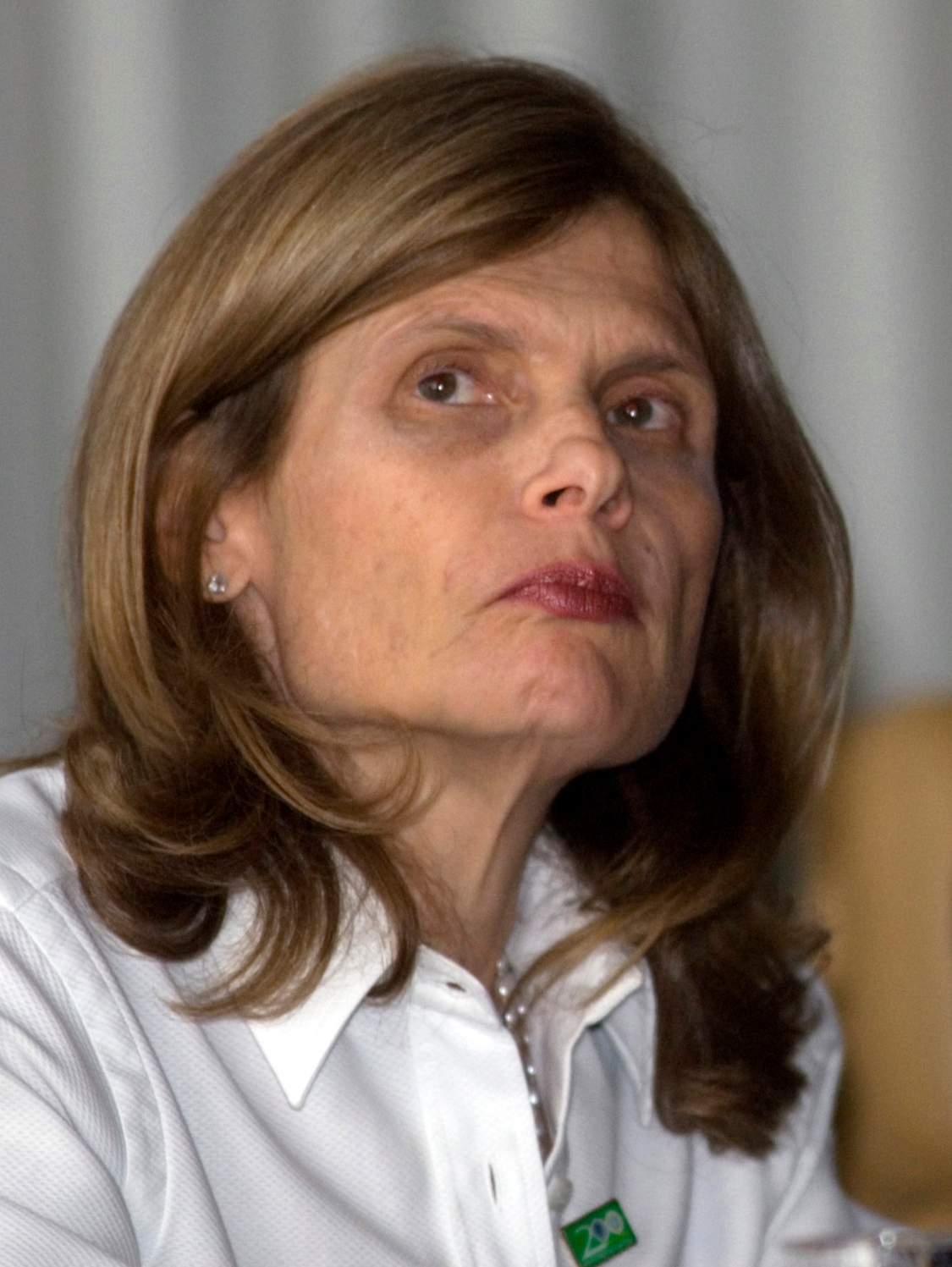

Minister of the Economy, Finances and Planning
- In office March 15, 1990 – May 10, 1991
- President: Fernando Collor de Mello
- Preceded by: Maílson da Nóbrega
- Succeeded by: Marcílio Marques Moreira

Personal details
- Born: Zélia Maria Cardoso de Mello; September 20, 1953 (age 73) São Paulo, Brazil
- Party: PPB (1995–97)
- Spouse: Chico Anysio (m. 1992; div. 1998)
- Education: University of São Paulo (BEc)
- Profession: Economist

Zélia Maria Cardoso de Mello (born September 20, 1953, in São Paulo) served as Brazil's Minister of Economy from 1990 to 1991 under Fernando Collor de Mello. She was later married to Brazilian comedian Chico Anysio, with whom she has two children, Rodrigo and Victoria. The couple divorced in 1998.

Zélia Cardoso de Mello worked in the academic, public and private sectors in Brazil. She graduated from FEA-USP where she also got her PhD degree in economics. She was a professor at the University of São Paulo for almost 20 years.

Her political career began in 1986 when Dilson Funaro, the Minister of Finance of Brazil, invited her to join his Economic Advisory Team as Director of the National Treasure Dept. In 1990 Cardoso de Mello was appointed the National Minister of Economy, Finance and Planning of Brazil under president Fernando Collor de Mello. After significant criticism, she resigned this position in May 1991.

In 1991, she released a biography, "Zelia, A Passion". It became a best-seller, perhaps because, according to a review, "It says little about tax reform and inflation, but a lot about Cardoso's sexual exploits in office."

In 1995 she moved to New York City and became a visiting scholar at the Institute of Latin America and Iberian Studies at Columbia University. Since 1998, Cardoso de Mello has served executive positions at several major financial advisory companies focused on Brazil, including Global Access Investments, Orix and Lily Pond Capital. Her academic career was entirely accomplished in the School of Business and Economics at the University of São Paulo, where she achieved both her college degree and her doctorate, and where served as university professor. She is currently a partner at New York-based Aquila Associates.

== Finance minister ==
As minister, Zélia was responsible for the implementation of the Plano Collor, which combined fiscal and trade liberalization with radical inflation stabilization measures. A monetarist inflation stabilization was coupled with an industrial and foreign trade reform program, the Industrial and Foreign Trade Policy (Portuguese: Política Industrial e de Comércio Exterior), better known as PICE, and a privatization program dubbed the "National Privatization Program" (Portuguese: Programa Nacional de Desestatização), better known as the PND. The PICE was geared towards opening the Brazilian marketing to foreign competition while simultaneously fostering domestic innovation, whereas the PND was the first large-scale privatization program in Brazil, generating nearly US$4 billion for the government and privatizing 18 different state-owned enterprises.

According to Carlos Eduardo Carvalho, from Departamento de Economia da Pontifícia Universidade Católica de São Paulo: "The Collor Plan itself began to be formatted by the president-elects advisors at the end of December 1989, after his victory in the runoff election. The final draft was probably strongly influenced by a document discussed by the advisors of PMDB party candidate Ulysses Guimarães, and later by advisors of PT party candidate Luiz Inácio Lula da Silva, during the period between the general election and the runoff. In spite of the differences in their general economic strategies, these competing candidates failed to develop their own stabilization policies at a time of rapid price increases and risk of hyperinflation during the second half of 1989. The proposal to block liquidity originated in academic debate and was imposed upon the main presidential candidacies."

== Political scandal ==
In 1990, Cardoso de Mello had an affair with the Minister of Justice Bernardo Cabral, which was revealed when the couple danced cheek to cheek to Bésame Mucho during a birthday party held for Zélia. A married father of three, Cabral was forced to resign as a result. At a ceremony few days later, the regimental band of the presidential guard (Os Dragões da Independência), introduced Zélia with "Bésame Mucho" instead of the usual military march. Its musical director, Lt. Geraldo Mendonça da Lima, was subsequently given 3 days' detention for insubordination.

== See also ==
- Plano Collor
- Fernando Collor de Mello

== Notes ==
Political offices
| Preceded by Maílson da Nóbrega | Minister of the Economy, Finances and Planning; 1990–1991 | Succeeded by Marcílio Marques Moreira |
