= Dilson Funaro =

Brazilian businessman and politician

Minister of Finance
- In office August 26, 1985 – April 29, 1987
- President: José Sarney
- Preceded by: Francisco Dornelles
- Succeeded by: Luiz Carlos Bresser-Pereira

CEO of the Brazilian Development Bank
- In office March 16, 1985 – August 27, 1985
- Nominated by: José Sarney
- Preceded by: José Carlos Perdigão Medeiros da Fonseca
- Succeeded by: André Franco Montoro Filho

Personal details
- Born: October 23, 1933 São Paulo, São Paulo, Brazil
- Died: April 12, 1989 (aged 55) São Paulo, São Paulo, Brazil
- Education: Mackenzie Presbyterian University

Dilson Domingos Funaro (October 23, 1933 – April 12, 1989) was a Brazilian businessman and politician, owner of the toy company Indústria de Brinquedos Trol. He was also CEO of the Brazilian Development Bank and later Finance Minister of Brazil during the term of President José Sarney, from August 1985 to April 1987. During his tenure as Finance Minister he was responsible for the creation of a plan for the stabilization of Brazil's monetary policy, the Plano Cruzado. He also was responsible for the unilateral suspension of payments on the Brazilian Republic's external debt to foreign financial institutions, which was implemented on February 20, 1987. With Brazil's financial crisis continuing with seemingly no solution on the horizon, Funaro was asked to resign from his post just a few months later.

== Personal life ==
Funaro was the son of Paschoal Funaro and Helena Kraljevic, and grandson of Domingos Funaro (a native of Catanzaro, Calabria, Italy). Coming from a wealthy family, he studied engineering at Mackenzie Presbyterian University, and while still at a young age joined CIBRAPE, an industrial concern specialized in plastics. Not long after he acquired Monitora and later Trol, a major manufacturer of plastics for industry, domestic use, and toys.

In October 1982, Funaro discovered that he was suffering from lymphatic cancer, and that it was a particularly serious form of the disease. Despite receiving treatment, he suffered a number of relapses that eventually led to his death in 1989.

He was married to and survived by Ana Maria Matarazzo Suplicy (daughter of Paul Cochrane Suplicy and Filomena Matarazzo, and sister of noted politician Eduardo Matarazzo Suplicy), with whom he had six children.

== Plano Cruzado ==
After serving in a number of posts in both industry and government over two-and-a-half decades, Funaro was appointed head of the Brazilian Development Bank in March 1985 at the request of President Sarney. That August, Sarney promoted him to head the Finance Ministry, the first minister that the president personally appointed after inheriting his cabinet from late President-elect Tancredo Neves. Funaro was quickly recognized as the most powerful member of Sarney's government in the first months of his tenure, and used his wide-ranging power to tackle Brazil's explosive monetary inflation problem. These reforms were packaged as the Plano Cruzado, after the new currency that was introduced as the centerpiece of the initiative. It also included a freeze on wages and prices and an end to the system of automatic price increases known as indexing.

When the plan proved unable to stem inflation, Funaro switched tactics and introduced what was dubbed "Plano Cruzado II" which undid many of the previous reforms as well as raised taxes to curb the public demand for goods that had been generated by the revoking of indexing. This turnabout made the minister increasingly unpopular among the common citizens as well as politicians from rival parties, on both the left and right as well. When Funaro became convinced that Brazil's debt to foreign banks was making it impossible to generate economic growth, he convinced the Government to suspend interest payments on $67 billion worth of loans on February 20, 1987. This created panic in the international banking community, especially in the United States, over concerns that Brazil would be able to repay any of its loans.

By April 1987, Funaro's position became untenable and he resigned on the 29th. He was unable to recover politically from this setback before his death just two years later.

Government offices
| Preceded by Francisco Dornelles | Minister of Finance; August 26, 1985 – April 29, 1987 | Succeeded by Luiz Carlos Bresser-Pereira |
