= List of economic crises in Brazil =

The economy of Brazil has been characterized by instability, and exceptionally unstable periods have affected a number of Brazilian states before and after the country's independence in 1822.

== Before independence ==
Crisis	Description	Origin	Government
1745 slave measles epidemic	According to a 1745 "list of slaves who traveled to the county's engenho of Sergipe" in the Jesuit Registry, there were large losses in "all engenhos of Brazil" from an "epidemic brought by the Costa da Mina slave ship, [...] and caused damages, losses and costs" (to the colonial economy).	Internal	André de Melo e Castro
Late 18th-century mining decline	Caused by the depletion of the country's gold and other precious-metal mines, ending the Brazilian Gold Rush. During the colonial period, sugar followed by gold had been at the center of the economy. After the Gold Rush ended, Brazil lacked another substantial commodity to fill the gap left by the precious metals. During the crisis, the population's purchasing power was severely reduced. The crisis ended during the 19th century, when coffee became central to the Brazilian economy.	Internal	Several, including John VI of Portugal and Pedro I of Brazil

== After independence ==
Crisis	Description	Origin	Government
Crisis of Independence	Crisis during the process of Brazil's independence, characterized by a lengthy stagnation in exports, and ending when coffee became the country's main commodity.	Internal	Pedro I
1857 crisis	The crisis was caused by a Commodity price shock. Coffee prices fell during this Panic of 1857 and its sales fell from 2 million to 1.8 million bags the following year.	External	Pedro II
1864 crisis	Unlike the 1857 and the 1875 crisis, this one had an internal cause, which was an excessively recessive monetary policy adopted in the beginning of the decade.	Internal	Pedro II
Paraguayan War	A costly conflict. The war generated financial and economic hardships which lasted the rest of Pedro II's reign and antecipated the fall of the monarchy.	External	Pedro II
1875 crisis	This was a consequence of the Panic of 1873, which affected Brazil two years later. The crisis was marked by a large deficit in Brazil's public finances, and the government removed 20 percent of the country's money supply from circulation. It was revived by a drought in the Northeast Region two years later.	External	Pedro II
Encilhamento	The Encilhamento was a national economic bubble during the late 1880s and early 1890s which burst during the first Brazilian military dictatorship (1889–1894), leading to institutional and financial crises. Two finance ministers (Afonso Celso and Ruy Barbosa) adopted a policy of unrestricted credit for industrial investments backed by the abundant issuance of money. The economic incentives encouraged speculation, increased inflation, and encouraged fraudulent initial public offerings (IPOs) and takeovers.	Internal	Deodoro da Fonseca, Floriano Peixoto
Great Depression	The Great Depression was a severe worldwide economic depression during the 1930s, beginning in the United States. It greatly affected coffee production (Brazil's main export), and Getúlio Vargas' government bought and burned several tons of coffee to stabilize producer prices.	External	Getúlio Vargas
Oil crisis	The 1970s energy crisis occurred when the Western world, particularly the United States, Canada, Western Europe, Australia, and New Zealand, faced substantial petroleum shortages and higher prices. The decade's two worst years were 1973 and 1979, when the Yom Kippur War and the Iranian Revolution triggered interruptions in Mideast oil exports.	External	Emílio Garrastazu Médici, Ernesto Geisel
Latin American debt crisis	Brazil's "lost decade" was generally the 1980s, the final years of the country's military dictatorship and the first years of civilian government. It was a period of economic stagnation, hyperinflation, and crippling foreign debt. During the hyperinflation (which lasted into the 1990s), prices rose daily and consumers spent their paychecks as soon as they received them.	Internal	João Figueiredo, José Sarney, Fernando Collor de Mello, Itamar Franco
Tequila effect	Tequila effect is how the local consequences of the Mexican peso crisis of 1994 became known in Brazil. Brazil's economy had a brief recession, which lasted a few months.	External	Fernando Henrique Cardoso
Samba effect	A sharp depreciation (about one-third of its value) of the newly-adopted Brazilian real in 1999, when the Central Bank of Brazil modified its exchange rates and determination method.	Internal	Fernando Henrique Cardoso
2008 financial crisis	The 2008 financial crisis began in the United States and, although its effects were delayed in Brazil, there was a national economic slowdown.	External	Luiz Inácio Lula da Silva
2014 Brazilian economic crisis	Also known as the "great Brazilian recession", it was marked by two consecutive years of recession and a very slow recovery. The economic crisis led to a political one which, with other factors, culminated in the impeachment of Dilma Rousseff. The fiscal crisis was not an explicit cause of her impeachment.	Internal	Dilma Rousseff, Michel Temer
COVID-19 pandemic	In 2020, as Brazil was still recovering from the 2014 crisis, it was struck by the COVID-19 pandemic. In October 2020, the country's central bank predicted a four-percent drop in GDP.	External	Jair Bolsonaro

== See also ==
- Timeline of Brazilian economic stabilization plans
- Economic history of Brazil
