= Luiz Carlos Bresser-Pereira =

Brazilian economist and social science

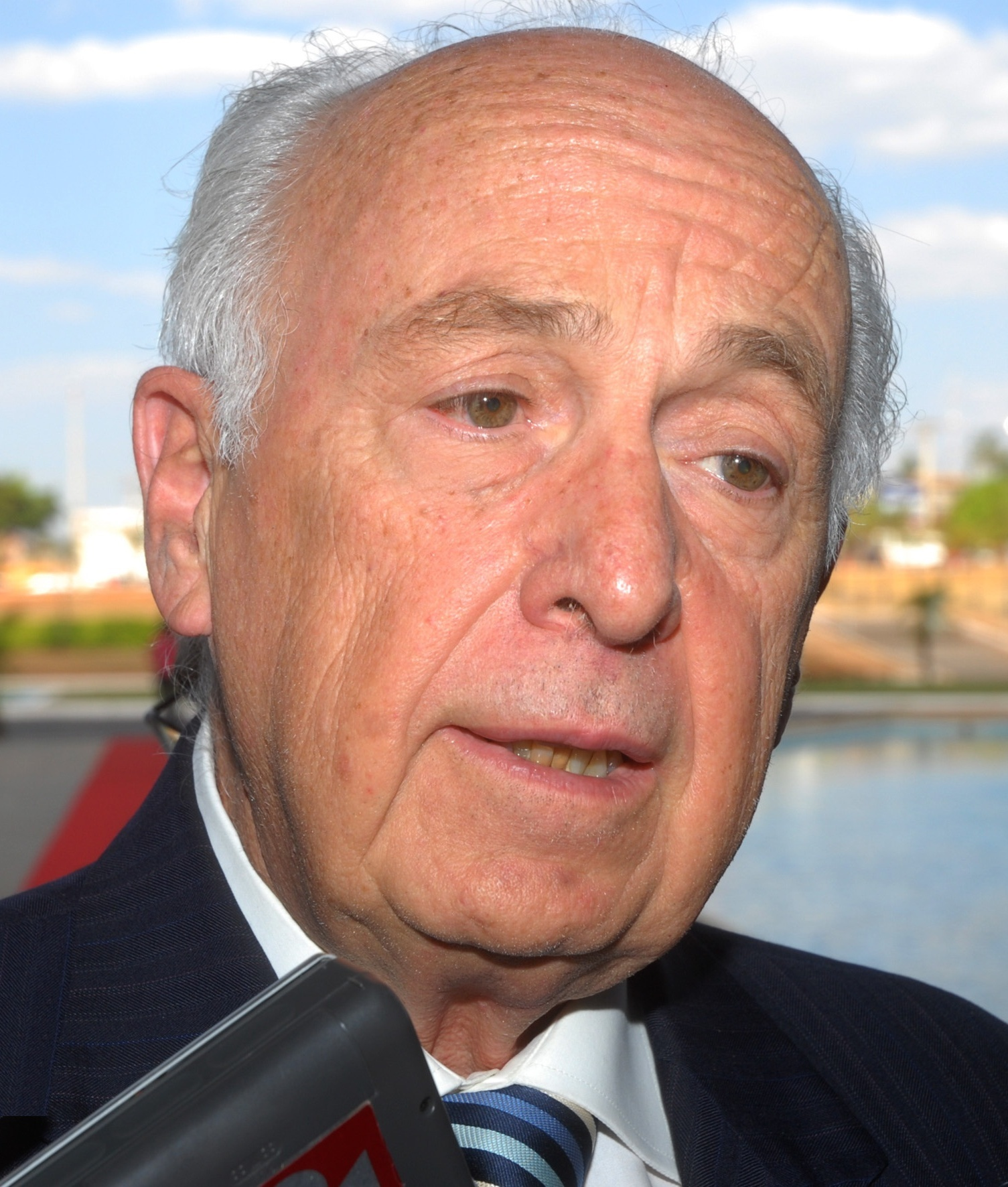
- Luiz Carlos Bresser-Pereira, Juca Pato Award 2015
- Born: 30 June 1934 (age 92); São Paulo, Brazil

Academic background
- Education: University of São Paulo
- Influences: Karl Marx, Max Weber, John Maynard Keynes, John Kenneth Galbraith, Celso Furtado, Nicholas Kaldor, Ignácio Rangel

Academic work
- School or tradition: Development economics, Post-Keynesian macroeconomics
- Institutions: Getulio Vargas Foundation
- Notable ideas: Inertial inflation, new developmentalism, technobureaucracy
- Awards: Emeritus Professor, Getulio Vargas Foundation (2005); Doctor Honoris Causa, University of Buenos Aires (2010); James Street Scholar, Association for Evolutionary Economics (2012)
- Website: http://www.bresserpereira.org.br

Luiz Carlos Bresser-Pereira (born 30 June 1934) is a Brazilian economist and social scientist. He teaches at the Getulio Vargas Foundation in São Paulo, a position he has held since 1959. In 1981, he founded the Brazilian Journal of Political Economy and since then has served as its editor.

Bresser-Pereira served as the Minister of Finance of Brazil in 1987, under the presidency of José Sarney, and helped propose what would eventually become the Brady Plan which solved the country's foreign debt crisis. He also led the Ministry of Federal Administration and Reform of the State (MARE) from 1995 to 1998 and was Minister of Science and Technology in 1999.

His main influences are Marx, Max Weber and Keynes; on the Brazilian economy, Celso Furtado e Ignácio Rangel. As an economist, he aligns with classical developmentalism and is a post-Keynesian. He has never defined himself as a Marxist, but remarks his intellectual admiration for Marx, mainly because he adopts a historico-structural method, the origins of which lie in the dialectical materialist tradition. His main contributions, by the order they were made, have been on Brazilian political economy, Marxian economics, social theory, the theory of inertial inflation, democratic transition and consolidation, managerial reform of the state apparatus theory, the methodological critique of neoclassical economics, and the economics and political economy of new developmentalism.

== Career ==
Luiz Carlos Bresser-Pereira was born in 1934 in São Paulo. He received a bachelor's degree in Law from the University of São Paulo (1957), an MBA from Michigan State University in 1960, and a PhD (1974) and livre-docência in Economics (1984) from the University of São Paulo. He has taught at the Getulio Vargas Foundation since 1962. He was visiting professor at Pantheon-Sorbonne University (1977), at the School for Advanced Studies in the Social Sciences (2003–2010), at the University of São Paulo (1989 and 2002–2003), and at the École d’Hautes Études en Sciences Sociales (2004-2013). He was also visiting fellow at Nuffield College, Oxford University (1999) and St Antony's College, Oxford University (2001).

From 1963 to 1982, while maintaining his academic roles, he was vice-president of Grupo Pão de Açúcar which by 1982 had become the largest retail chain in Brazil. In 1983, when Brazil was beginning to democratize, he entered public office, first as president of the Bank of the State of São Paulo (1983–1984). In 1985 and 1986, he was Chief of Staff of the Governor of São Paulo, André Franco Montoro. In 1987, he became Minister of Finance in the José Sarney administration. After leaving the ministry, he was a founding member of the Brazilian Social Democracy Party (PSDB). Between 1995 and 1998, he was the head of the MARE, and in 1999 Minister of Science, Technology and Innovation, both under the Fernando Henrique Cardoso administration. After 1999 he returned full-time to academia. In 2010 he left the PSDB, arguing that the political party, which was supposed to be social democratic, had turned conservative.

=== Finance Minister (1987) ===
In 1987 he took over the Brazilian Ministry of Finance at a moment of deep crisis that followed the failure of the Cruzado Plan: inflation reached 15% a month, while both firms and Brazil's states went bankrupt. Negotiations with the International Monetary Fund (IMF) and the fiscal adjustments that their proposals would entail were seen by the politicians in power as unacceptable. Nevertheless, Bresser-Pereira prepared a "Macroeconomic Adjustment Plan", which included measures necessary to control inflation. Second, he prepared and adopted what came to be known as the Bresser Plan, which was ultimately not successful. Third, he developed a plan based on the securitization of all highly foreign indebted countries, having as reference the measures New York City had taken to bring its debt under control in the 1970s. This approach was originally rejected by US Treasury Secretary James Baker. Nevertheless 18 months later, given the support of IMF and the commercial banks, it was taken up by Baker's successor, Nicholas F. Brady, and it was the Brady Plan that brought the 1980s' great foreign debt crisis to a close.

=== Minister of Federal Administration and Reform of the State (1995–1998) ===
In 1995, with the election of Fernando Henrique Cardoso to the presidency of Brazil, Bresser-Pereira took charge of the Ministry of Federal Administration and Reform of the State (MARE). (Note: The MARE existed between 1995 and 1998. After that period, its functions were transferred to the Ministry of Planning, Budget, and Management.) He developed a white paper, "Plano Diretor da Reforma do Aparelho do Estado" (English: 'Master Plan for the Reform of the State Apparatus'), which offered a theoretical framework for reforms of the public sector based on managerial principles, distinguishing three sectors – (a) the strategic core of the state, (b) the exclusive activities involving state power, and (c) the non-exclusive activities, mostly universal services, that the state provides – and proposed a different managerial treatment for each sector. He also created the social organizations – non-profit type of organization recognized by the state in each case that was mainly used to run hospitals, museums, research institutes, and in a lesser extent universities. On the other hand, based on the New Public Management (NPM), which was developed a few years before in Britain, Bresser-Pereira defined some new management strategies: management by results, competition for excellence between state organizations, and formal systems of social accountability. The reforms he led in 1998 became an international benchmark of their type. The books and papers that Bresser-Pereira wrote on the subject have become a main element in courses on public administration offered by the school of public administration of the Brazilian universities. Several master's and PhD dissertations have been written on the reform. While at the MARE, Bresser-Pereira was also president of the Latin American Center for the Administration of Development (Portuguese: Centro Latino Americano de Administração para o Desenvolvimento; CLAD) between 1995 and 1997.

=== Minister of Science and Technology (1999) ===
At the Ministry of Science, Technology and Innovation Bresser-Pereira defined the policy of transforming the research funds originated from the recently privatized state-owned enterprises into Sectorial Funds attached to the National Fund for Scientific and Technological Development. In order to achieve better integration between the Ministry and its main agency, the National Council for Scientific and Technological Development (CNPq), he also presided over the agency. Bresser-Pereira unified the academic curriculum vitae (CV) that the Federal Government requires for the evaluation of researchers under the Lattes Platform. (Note: In 1999, when Bresser-Pereira assumed the Ministry of Science and Technology there were three CVs in use: one in CNPq, other in CAPES, and a third in a program financed by the World Bank. He chose the most developed one at that time, CNPq's, changed its name to Lattes, in homage to Cezar Lattes, and obtained the agreement of CAPES. Later on, the research institutions at state level also adopted Lattes as their official academic CV.)

He is a frequent contributor to newspapers, particularly to Folha de S.Paulo, since 1974, and from 2000, also to Valor Econômico.

== Academic career ==
Bresser-Pereira works for Getulio Vargas Foundation since 1959, when he was admitted as instructor; teaches since 1962; In 2005 he was nominated the first Professor Emeritus at the Foundation; he continues to teach at the graduate program. In 1996 at the foundation in São Paulo, he created the first master's program for business administration in Brazil; in 1989, the first master and doctoral program in public administration and government in the Foundation. In 1980 he founded the Centro de Economia Política to publish the Brazilian Journal of Political Economy, a uarterly journal.

=== Research threads ===
The rise of the managerial social class. In the 1970s, Bresser-Pereira published three papers (1972; 1977; 1978) defending the emergence of the managerial or technobureaucratic class, which was rising in the capitalist societies and was dominant in the communist countries.

On the falling tendency of the rate of profit. In 1986, Bresser-Pereira published Lucro, Acumulação and Crise [Profit, Accumulation and Crisis] (Editora Brasiliense, 1986) and “Growth and distribution: a revised classical model" (2018). in which he discussed Marx's falling tendency in the rate of profit. The main innovation was his use of Marx's model to analyse the phases of capitalism.

Mainly in Democracy and Capitalist Revolution (Cambridge University Press, 2011).

On the theory of the public management reform. Mainly in Democracy and Public Management Reform (Oxford: Oxford University Press, 2004). This theory was developed while Bresser-Pereira while he was minister of Public Administration and Reform of the State (see above).

On the methodological critique of neoclassical economics. Bresser-Pereira wrote two papers (“The two methods and the hard core of economics” (2009) and “Historical models and economic syllogisms’ (2018)), in which he criticised neoclassical economics for adopting the hypothetic-deductive method, proper of a methodological science, as the main method to understand a real phenomenon – the economic systems. The outcome was absurdly abstract knowledge that is rather an ideology legitimizing economic liberalism than a school of thought.

New developmentalism. Since 2002, Bresser-Pereira is developing a development macroeconomics – the new-developmental theory, which is based on classical development economics and post-Keynesian economics. The two books summing up its economics are Developmental Macroeconomics (2014), with Nelson Marconi and José Luis Oreiro, and New Developmentalism (2024).; the book in which Bresser-Pereira develops and applies the new developmentalism's political economy is Rise and Fall of Neoliberal Rentier Capitalism (2025).

== Publications ==
=== Selected books ===
- 1984 - Development and Crisis in Brazil. Westview Press. 1984. ISBN 0-86531-559-0.
- 1981 - A Sociedade Estatal e a Tecnoburocracia [State Society and Technobureaucracy] (in Portuguese). Editora Brasiliense. 1981.
- 1986 - Lucro, Acumulação e Crise [Profit, Accumulation and Crisis] (in Portuguese). Editora Brasiliense. 1986. ISBN 8511090339.
- 1987 - The Theory of Inertial Inflation, with Yoshiaki Nakano. Lynne Rienner Publishers. 1987. ISBN 1-55587-007-4.
- 1992 - A Crise do Estado [The Crisis of the State] (1992) São Paulo: Editora Nobel. 1992. ISBN 85-213-0721-7
- 1993 - Economic Reforms in New Democracies, with José María Maravall and Adam Przeworski. Cambridge University Press. 1993. ISBN 1-55587-532-7.
- 2004 - Democracy and Public Management Reform. Oxford University Press. ISBN 0-19-926118-0.
- 2009 - Developing Brazil: Overcoming the Failure of the Washington Consensus. Lynne Rienner Publishers. 2009. ISBN 978-1-58826-624-8.
- 2010 - Globalization and Competition. Cambridge University Press. 2010. ISBN 978-0-521-19635-2.
- 2014 - Developmental Macroeconomics: New Developmentalism as a Growth Strategy, with Nelson Marconi and José Luis Oreiro. London: Routledge, 2014. ISBN 978-0-415-81778-3 (hardback) and ISBN 978-0-203-58350-0 (e-book).
- 2019 - The Political Construction of Brazil: Society, Economy, and State Since Independence. Lynne Rienner Publishers. 2017. ISBN 978-1-62637-307-5.
- 2024 - New Developmentalism: Introducing a new economics and political economy. 2024, Edwar Elgar Publishing. ISBN 978-1-80392-778-7
- 2025 - Rise and Fall of Neoliberal Rentier Capitalism. 2024. Oxford University Press (forthcoming).

=== Selected papers ===
- 1984 - "Accelerating, maintaining, and sanctioning factor of inflation", with Yoshiaki Nakano, Brazilian Journal of Political Economy 4 (1) January 1984: 5-21. 1984
- 1984 - "Six interpretations on the Brazilian social formation". Latin American Perspectives. 11 (1): 35–72. Winter 1984.
- 2002 - “Foreign savings, insufficiency of demand, and low growth” with Paulo Gala, Journal of Post Keynesian Economics, 30 (3): 315-334. 2002.
- 2002 - "Citizenship and res publica: the emergence of republican rights". Citizenship Studies. 6 (2): 145–164. 2002.
- 2002 - “Economic growth with foreign savings?" (2002), com Yoshiaki Nakano. Revista de Economia Política 23 (2), Abril 2003: 3-27 (apenas na versão digital).
- 2009 - "The two methods and the hard core of economics". Journal of Post Keynesian Economics. 31 (3): 493–522. Spring 2009.
- 2010 - "The global financial crisis, neoclassical economics, and the neoliberal years of capitalism". Revue de la Régulation. 7: 1–29. Spring 2010.
- 2010 - From classical developmentalism and Post-Keynesian macroeconomics to new developmentalism”, Brazilian Journal of Political Economy 39(2) April: 187-2010. “Models of developmental state”, CEPAL Review,128, August: 35-47. 2019.
- 2011 - "From the national-bourgeoisie to the dependency interpretation of Latin America". Latin American Perspectives. 178, 38 (3): 40–58. May 2011.
- 2012 - "Democracy and capitalist revolution". Économie Appliquée. 65 (4): 111–139. 2012.
- 2015 - “The access to demand”, Keynesian Brazilian Review 1 (1) 1^{o.} semester: 35-43. 2015.
- 2018 - "Growth and distribution: a revised classical model" (2018). Brazilian Journal of Political Economy 38(1) January 2018: 3-27.
- 2018 - “Historical models and economic syllogisms”, Journal of Economic Methodology, 25: 68-82. 2018.
- 2019 - “An alternative to the middle-income trap”, with Eliane Cristina Araújo and Samuel Costa Peres, Structural Change and Economic Dynamics, 52, March: 294-312. 2019.
- 2019 - “Why did trade liberalization work for East Asia but fail in Latin America?”, Challenge 62 (4): 273-277. 2019.
- 2020 - “Models of the developmental state”, CEPAL Review, 128, August: 35-47. 2019.
- 2020 - “Financialisation, coalition of interests and interest rate in Brazil”, with Luiz Fernando de Paula and Miguel Bruno, Revue de la Régulation, 27: 21-31. Spring 2020.
- 2020 - “New Developmentalism: development macroeconomics for middle-income countries”, Cambridge Journal of Economics, 44: 629–646. 2020.
- 2024 - “A brief history of development theory, with José Luis Oreiro, Brazilian Journal of Political Economy, 44 (1) January: 5-28. 2024.

== Honors and distinctions ==
- 1993 – Jabuti Prize for the book A Crise do Estado (Editora Brasiliense, 1992).
- 1997 – Honorary Knight Commander of The Most Excellent Order of the British Empire
- 2005 – Professor Emeritus, Getulio Vargas Foundation
- 2010 – Doctor Honoris Causae, University of Buenos Aires
- 2012 – James Street Scholar, Association for Evolutionary Economics
- 2015 – Juca Pato Award, as the 2014 intellectual of the year, Brazilian Association of Writers
- 2017 – Title of Emeritus Researcher (Applied Social Sciences), CNPq
