= Brazilian cruzeiro =

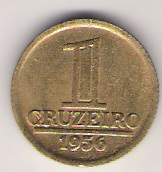
1 Cruzeiro BRZ coin (1942-1967). Minted in 1956.

Brazilian cruzeiro refers to any of four distinct Brazilian currencies:

- Brazilian cruzeiro (1942–1967), worth 1000 Brazilian réis.
- Brazilian cruzeiro (1967–1986), denominated cruzeiro novo between 1967 and 1970 in the transition from the previous standard banknotes to the new banknotes issued by Casa da Moeda do Brasil to avoid confusion between the old and the new currency, worth 1000 old cruzeiros.
- Brazilian cruzeiro (1990–1993), redenomination of cruzado novo stemming from the Plano Collor.
- Brazilian cruzeiro real (1993–1994), currency with a view to facilitating accounting transactions in the transition between the 1990–1993 cruzeiro and real, necessary due to the difficulties of accounting values at the time due to inflation.

== See also ==
- Brazilian cruzado (1986–1989)
- Brazilian cruzado novo (1989–1990)
- O Cruzeiro (Brazilian weekly, 1928–1975)
