= Banknotes of the Brazilian cruzado =

Currency of Brazilians

Brazilian cruzado
cruzado brasileira (Portuguese)
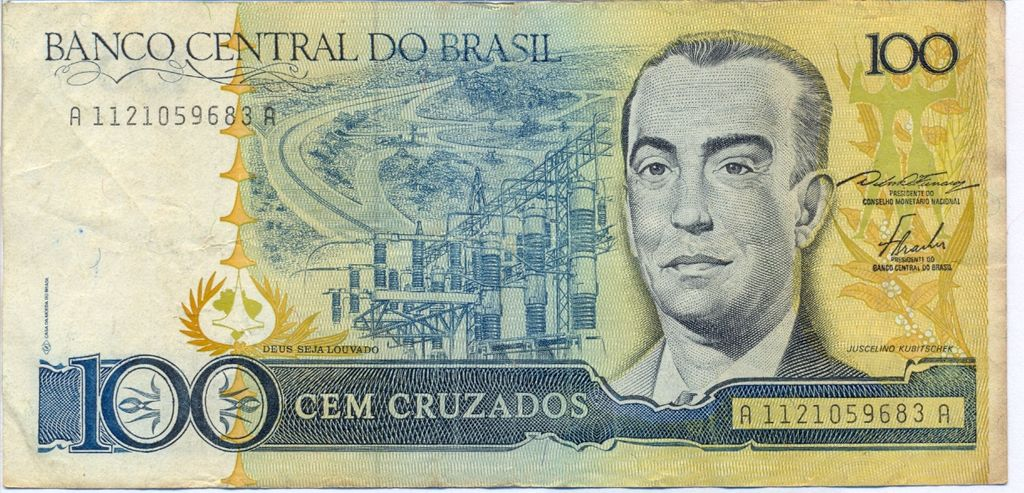
- 100 cruzados banknote

ISO 4217
- Code: BRC

Unit
- Plural: cruzados
- Symbol: Cz$

Denominations
- Banknotes: 10, 50, 100, 500, 1000, 5000, 10 000 Cz$

Demographics
- Date of introduction: 28 February 1986
- Replaced: cruzeiro (second)
- Replaced by: cruzado novo
- User(s): Brazil

Issuance
- Central bank: Central Bank of Brazil
- Website: www.bc.gov.br
- Printer: Casa da Moeda do Brasil
- Website: www.casadamoeda.gov.br

Valuation
- Inflation: 147%(1986); 228%(1987); 629%(1988)
- Source: IMF International Financial Statistics (IFS)
- Value: 1 cruzado at 1000 cruzeiros
- Banknotes dimension 154 x 74 mm

In 1986 because of inflation banknotes of the cruzado were issued by Central Bank of Brazil in denominations of 10, 50, 100, 500, 1000, 5000 and 10 000 cruzados. This bank had the sole authority to issue cruzado notes and Casa da Moeda do Brasil was the sole printer of these banknotes. Cruzado notes on the front/obverse featured prominent people while on the back/reverse depicted buildings and/or activities of those people mentioned before. Between 1989 and 1990 cruzado currency had also been replaced, this time by cruzado novo at a rate of 1 cruzado novo to 1000 cruzados.

== History ==
The name cruzado was inspired by the name of an old Portuguese silver coin, which had value of 400/480 réis and that circulated in the time in which Brazil was still a colony of Portugal.
On 28 February 1986 cruzado currency was created by José Sarney, the 31st president of Brazil, when Dilson Funaro was the minister of Finance, through Cruzado plan as part of a set of economic measures to freeze wages and prices. It was marked by return of centavo as a subdivision of the currency, since it had been abolished in 1984, due to devaluation of the cruzeiro (second).

== Cruzeiro (second) with cruzado overstamp ==
Cruzado replaced cruzeiro (second) at a rate of 1 cruzado to 1000 cruzeiros. From February 28, 1986, until April 21, 1986, the currency in circulation consisted of old cruzeiro banknotes and coins accepted at the rate of 1,000 cruzeiros per cruzado, with banknotes stamped with the value in cruzados only entering into circulation in practice on April 22. First banknotes on 10 000 cruzeiros notes with face of Ruy Barbosa, 50 000 cruzeiros notes with face of Oswaldo Cruz and 100 000 cruzeiros notes with face of Juscelino Kubitschek were reused with only on front/obverse round-shaped overstamps of value 10, 50 and 100 cruzados. All these banknotes were 154 x 74 mm in size and consisted of series year 1986.

Cruzeiro with cruzado overstamp (BRC)
Pick nr	Image	Value	Description	First issue
206		Cz$10	Front 10 000 cruzeiros banknote overstamped with a value of 10 cruzados.	22 April 1986
207		Cz$50	Front 50 000 cruzeiros banknote overstamped with a value of 50 cruzados.	22 April 1986
208		Cz$100	Front 100 000 cruzeiros banknote overstamped with a value of 100 cruzados.	22 April 1986

== Cruzado ==
In October 1986 started the distribution of cruzado banknotes in a new standard. These banknotes had only replaced caption and face value of 10, 50 and 100 cruzados. New 500 cruzados notes with face of Heitor Villa-Lobos were also released in October 1986. New 1000 cruzados banknotes with face of Machado de Assis were issued in 1987. While new 5000 cruzados notes with face of Candido Portinari and new 10 000 cruzados notes with face of Carlos Chagas were released in 1988, and these would become the last banknotes of this monetary standard. Cruzado currency was represented by symbol Cz$ and had code ISO 4217 BRC. All cruzados banknotes were 154 x 74 mm in size and were withdrawn from circulation throughout the 1990.

Cruzado (BRC)
Pick nr	Image	Value	Description	First issue
209		Cz$10	Front; Ruy Barbosa de Oliveira; Diplomat, writer, jurist and politician.	20 October 1986
209		Cz$10	Back; 2nd convention signed at The Hague on 18 October 1907.	20 October 1986
210		Cz$50	Front; Oswaldo Gonçalves Cruz; Physician, pioneer bacteriologist, epidemiologist and public health officer.	20 October 1986
210		Cz$50	Back; Neo-Moorish Palace of Manguinhos in Rio de Janeiro, seat of Oswaldo Cruz Foundation.	20 October 1986
211		Cz$100	Front; Juscelino Kubitschek; 21st president of Brazil, initiator behind building Brasilia.	20 October 1986
211		Cz$100	Back; Buildings of Brasilia, National Congress, "Catetinho" and Alvorado Palace.	20 October 1986
212		Cz$500	Front; Heitor Villa-Lobos; Composer, conductor, cellist, pianist and guitarist.	20 October 1986
212		Cz$500	Back; Heitor Villa-Lobos as a conductor.	20 October 1986
213		Cz$1000	Front; Joaquim Maria Machado de Assis Writer of Brazilian literature.	20 October 1987
213		Cz$1000	Back; View of 1 March street in 1905; Rio de Janeiro.	20 October 1987
214		Cz$5000	Front; Candido Portinari; Neo-realist painter "Tiradentes" in the background.	15 September 1988
214		Cz$5000	Back; Portinari drawing panel "Baianas" in 1953.	15 September 1988
215		Cz$ 10000	Front; Carlos Chagas; Sanitary physicien, bacteriologist.	24 November 1988
215		Cz$ 10000	Back; Chagas at work in laboratory.	24 November 1988

== Cruzado banknote not issued ==
There was a plan of 50 000 cruzados banknote with effigie of Carlos Drummond de Andrade to be released in 1989. However it was not launched due to change of currency for cruzado novo in January 1989.

== Cruzado with cruzado novo overstamp ==
On 15 January 1989 cruzado novo was created by José Sarney 31st president of Brazil, when Naílson da Nóbrega was minister of Finance, through Summer plan (fourth stabilization plan) which was aimed at controlling rising inflation. Inflation went from 228% in year 1987 to 629% in year 1988. Cruzado novo replaced cruzado at a rate of 1 cruzado novo to 1000 cruzados, but was short-lived from 15 January 1989 until 15 March 1990 just 14 months. Banknotes of 1000 cruzados with face of Machado de Assis, 5000 cruzados with face of Candido Portinari and 10 000 cruzados with face of Carlos Chagas were reused with only on front/obverse triangular overstamps of value 1, 5 and 10 cruzados novos. All these banknote were 154 x 74 mm in size and of series year 1989. Cruzado novo was represented by symbol NCz$ and had ISO 4217 BRN.

Cruzado with cruzado novo overstamp (BRN)
Pick nr	Image	Value	Description	First issue
216		NCz$1	Front; 1000 cruzados banknote overstamped with a value of 1 cruzado novo.	16 January 1989
217		NCz$5	Front; 5000 cruzados banknote overstamped with a value of 5 cruzados novos.	16 January 1989
218		NCz$10	Front; 10 000 cruzados banknote overstamped with a value of 10 cruzados novos.	16 January 1989

Preceded by Cruzeiro (second)	Cruzado; 1986-1989	Succeeded by Cruzado novo

== See also ==
- Brazilian cruzado
- Brazilian cruzado novo
- Brazilian cruzeiro
- Hyperinflation in Brazil
- Timeline of Brazilian economic stabilization plans
- Albert Pick
