= Brazilian cruzeiro (1942–1967) =

Brazilian currency from 1942 to 1967

- A 2 cruzeiros banknote from 1958, featuring the bust of Duque de Caxias on the obverse

Units of account
- Base unit: cruzeiro
- Plural: cruzeiros
- Symbol: Cr$ (C$)
- Subunit
- 1/100: centavo
- Plural
- centavo: centavos

Denominations
- Banknotes: Cr$1, Cr$2, Cr$5, Cr$10, Cr$20, Cr$50, Cr$100, Cr$200, Cr$500, Cr$1000, Cr$5000, Cr$10 000
- Coins: 10, 20, 50 centavos, Cr$1, Cr$2, Cr$5, Cr$10, Cr$20, Cr$50

Demographics
- Date of introduction: 1 November 1942
- Replaced: Real (1st iteration)
- Date of withdrawal: 13 February 1967
- Replaced by: Cruzeiro (2nd iteration; BRB)
- User(s): Brazil (Estado Novo, Fourth Brazilian Republic, and Military Rule)

Issuance
- Central bank: Tesouro Nacional (until 1964); Banco Central do Brasil (since 1964)
- Printer: American Bank Note Company; Thomas de la Rue (2nd print); Casa da Moeda do Brasil (3rd print)
- Mint: Casa da Moeda do Brasil
- This infobox shows the latest status before this currency was rendered obsolete.

The (first) cruzeiro (Cr$ or C$) was the official currency of Brazil from 1942 to 1967. It replaced the old real (pl. réis), which had been in use since colonial times, at the rate of Rs 1$000 = Cr$1. It was in turn replaced by the cruzeiro novo, at the rate of Cr$1,000 = NCr$1.

The name cruzeiro was later reused for two other currencies, which were official in 1967–1986 (initially denominated as the cruzeiro novo to avoid confusion between new and old currency) and 1990–1993.

The cruzeiro was divided into 100 centavos, a convention that persisted through all subsequent Brazilian currencies, but in the first cruzeiro, values below Cr$0.10 were never issued because coins of less than Rs 100 had not been issued since 1935 (Note: The Rs 10 coin in particular (equivalent to Cr$0.01) had not circulated since the end of the 19th century).

The original plan, dating from the late 1920s, was to introduce a cruzeiro worth Rs 10$000 (ten mil-réis) and link it to the gold standard. However, due to the crash of 1929, the subsequent Revolution of 1930 and the worldwide abandonment of the gold standard in 1933, the plan was aborted. The redenomination eventually took place in 1942, but with the cruzeiro being worth Rs 1$000 (one mil-réis) and having no link to the gold standard.

== History ==
Since colonial times, the main currency in Brazil had been the real; first the same as the Portuguese currency, and a separate currency after the country's independence in 1822.

On 1 November 1942 the real was replaced by a new currency, the "cruzeiro", officially worth Rs 1$000 (mil réis, pronounced mirréis) — which had long been used informally as the currency unit for most retail trades. The old réis banknotes and coins remained in use for a while. Some were overstamped with the amount in cruzeiros. New cruzeiro banknotes were printed starting in 1943.

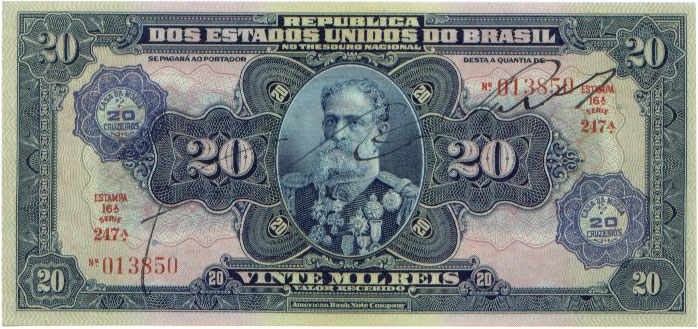
Rs 20$000 banknote overstamped "20 cruzeiros" near the upper left corner.

By 1967 devaluation (inflation) of the cruzeiro had rendered prices unwieldy, so on 13 February 1967 the military government decreed its replacement by a new currency, the cruzeiro novo (NCr$), at a rate of NCr$1 = Cr$1,000.

=== Name ===
The name refers to the constellation of the Southern Cross, known in Brazil as Cruzeiro do Sul, or simply Cruzeiro. Prominently visible in the southern hemisphere, it is a major cultural icon in Brazilian history. It is used in a number of Brazilian states' flags, was part of companies' logotypes (like former Sudameris Bank or flight company Cruzeiro do Sul) and also gave the name of Cruzeiro Esporte Clube, one of the main Brazilian soccer teams.

The name cruzeiro for the Brazilian currency was proposed in 1926, by Brazilian economist Carlos Inglês de Sousa (1882–1948). The first editorial of the Brazilian weekly magazine Cruzeiro apparently refers to this proposal as an alleged inspiration for its name.

=== Symbol ===
The cruzeiro broke with Portuguese and Brazilian traditions for the writing of currency amounts. Instead of using the double-stroke dollar sign (cifrão) as a thousands separator (as was the practice with reais) or as the decimal fraction separator (as Portugal adopted when it switched to the escudo and centavos), the cruzeiro followed its traditional notation for numbers in general, with period (".") and comma (",") used for those two functions, respectively.

The dollar sign was retained, but as part of the new currency symbol "Cr $" (two separate letters and a single-stroke dollar sign, with a space before the latter, to be written before the number, "whatever its amount". However, in subsequent years the two-stroke variant of the sign was often used too, and the space was usually omitted. Also, some typewriters and typefaces provided a typographic ligature "₢" (available in Unicode) to replace the "Cr" (thus producing "₢$").

== Coins ==
Six denominations of coin were introduced in 1942: Cr$0.10, Cr$0.20 and Cr$0.50, and Cr$1, Cr$2 and Cr$5. The centavos were initially struck in cupronickel, switching to aluminium bronze in 1943, whilst the cruzeiros were struck in aluminium bronze from the start. The Cr$5 was not struck after 1943.

First issue of standard circulating coins of the Cruzeiro (1942–1967)
Reverse	Obverse	Value	Diameter	Minting period	Obverse description
		Cr$0.10	17 mm	1942–1947	Portrays Getúlio Vargas
		Cr$0.20	19 mm	1942–1948	Portrays Getúlio Vargas
		Cr$0.50	21 mm	1942–1947	Portrays Getúlio Vargas
		Cr$1	23 mm	1942-1956	Portrays a relief map of Brazil
		Cr$2	25 mm	1942-1956	Portrays a relief map of Brazil
		Cr$5	27 mm	1942–1943	Portrays a relief map of Brazil

Following the end of the Vargas Era, in 1947 and 1948 replacements for the Cr$0.10, Cr$0.20 and Cr$0.50 coins were issued that did not portray Getúlio Vargas on the obverse. The new designs featured busts of proeminent Brazilian people, along with the new president, Dutra.

Second issue of standard circulating coins of the Cruzeiro (1942–1967)
Reverse	Obverse	Value	Diameter	Minting period	Obverse description
		Cr$0.10	17 mm	1947–1955	Portrays José Bonifácio
		Cr$0.20	19 mm	1948–1956	Portrays Ruy Barbosa
		Cr$0.50	21 mm	1948–1956	Portrays Eurico Gaspar Dutra

A few more designs were later introduced in 1956 and 1957, which eventually made aluminium replace aluminium bronze in all the coins. In 1956, aluminum-bronze coins were issued in the amounts of 50 centavos, 1 cruzeiro and 2 cruzeiros, taking advantage of old aluminum-bronze pieces that were used to issue the 10, 20 and 50 centavos coins respectively. In 1957, such values also began to be issued in aluminum. Coins dated up to 1961 would be minted in such denominations.

Third issue of standard circulating coins of the Cruzeiro (1942–1967)
Reverse	Obverse	Value	Diameter	Minting period	Obverse description
		Cr$0.50	17 mm	1956	Portrays the coat of arms of Brazil
		Cr$1	19 mm	1956	Portrays the coat of arms of Brazil
		Cr$2	21 mm	1956	Portrays the coat of arms of Brazil
		Cr$0.10	17 mm	1956–1961	Portrays the coat of arms of Brazil
		Cr$0.20	19 mm	1956–1961	Portrays the coat of arms of Brazil
		Cr$0.50	21 mm	1957–1961	Portrays the coat of arms of Brazil
		Cr$1	23 mm	1957–1961	Portrays the coat of arms of Brazil
		Cr$2	25 mm	1957–1961	Portrays the coat of arms of Brazil

In 1964, Law 4511 established the end of the cent and the issuance of coins of Cr$1, Cr$2, Cr$5, Cr$10, Cr$20, Cr$50, Cr$100, Cr$200 and Cr$500, with only coins in the denomination of Cr$10, Cr$20 and Cr$50 came to be launched in 1965.

Such coins lost their value in February 1968, a year after the introduction of the cruzeiro novo, having a shorter survival in circulation than the banknotes of equivalent value, not being directly replaced by the equivalent coins of the cruzeiro novo.

Fourth issue of standard circulating coins of the Cruzeiro (1942–1967)
Reverse	Obverse	Value	Diameter	Minting period	Obverse description
		Cr$10	23 mm	1965	Portrays a relief map of Brazil
		Cr$20	25 mm	1965	Portrays a relief map of Brazil
		Cr$50	17 mm	1965	Portrays the effigy of the Republic

== Banknotes ==
The first banknotes were overprints on earlier mil réis notes, with denominations of Cr$5, Cr$10, Cr$20, Cr$50, Cr$100, Cr$200 and Cr$500. Regular issues of cruzeiro banknotes began in 1943 with the addition of Cr$1,000 notes. Cr$1 and Cr$2 notes were introduced in 1944 and ceased production after 1958.

With the exception of the Cr$ 1 banknote, produced only by American Bank Note Company, the other banknotes of this standard were issued under a second stamp by Thomas de la Rue, bear the mention "2ª estampa" with variations in the color of the obverse of the banknote, with the Cr$ 5 banknotes issued until 1965 and the others (with the exception of the rare Cr$ 200 banknote of the second stamp) issued until the entry into circulation of the cruzeiro novo.

The first banknotes of the standard were autographed, a custom that continued until the early 1950s, when signatures began to appear on microseals. The "Nota do Índio" and banknotes issued up to the end of the 1950s bear the words "No Tesouro Nacional se pagará ao portador a quantia de" with the value in full followed by the term "Valor recebido" at the end. Banknotes issued in 1960s by the American Bank Note Company and Thomas de la Rue in amounts from Cr$5 to Cr$5,000 appear only with the terms "República dos Estados Unidos do Brasil", "Tesouro Nacional" and "Valor Legal" having the other aforementioned sayings suppressed.

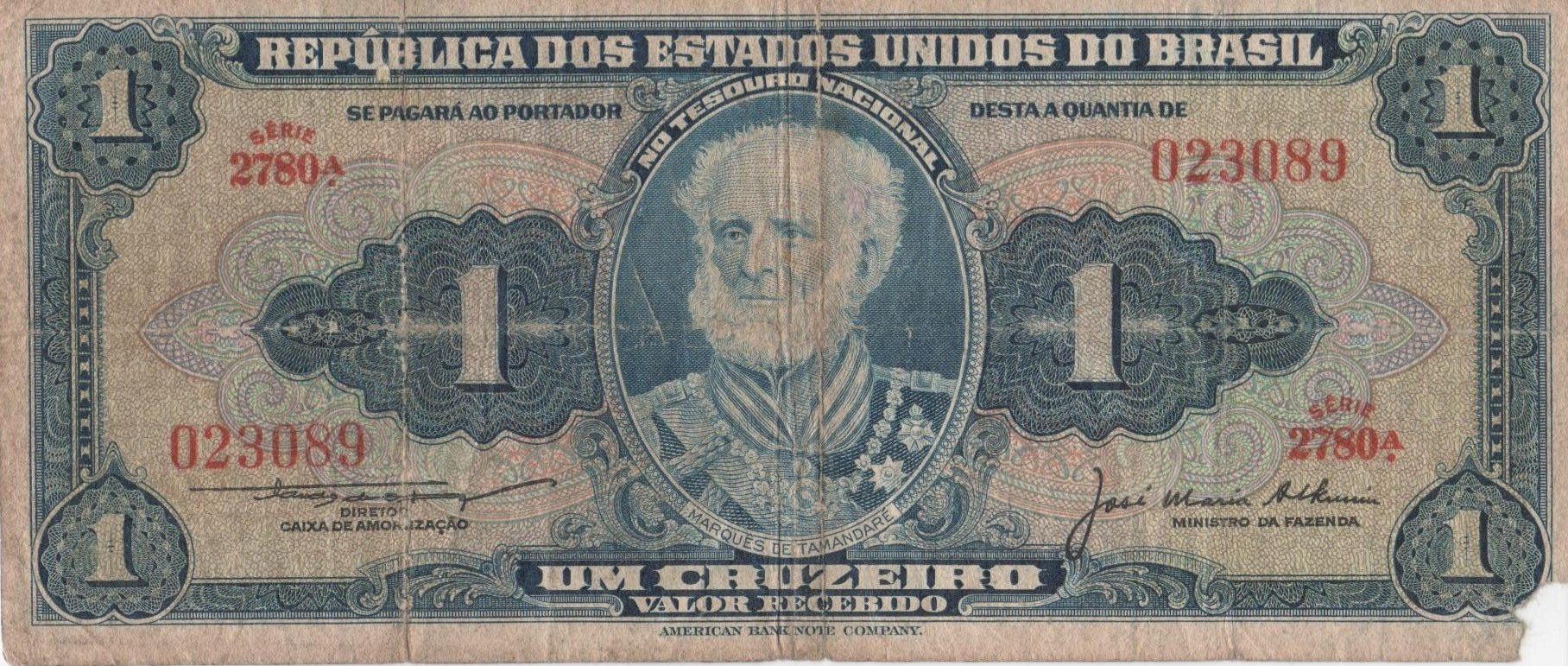
Cr$1 note, featuring the Marquis of Tamandaré

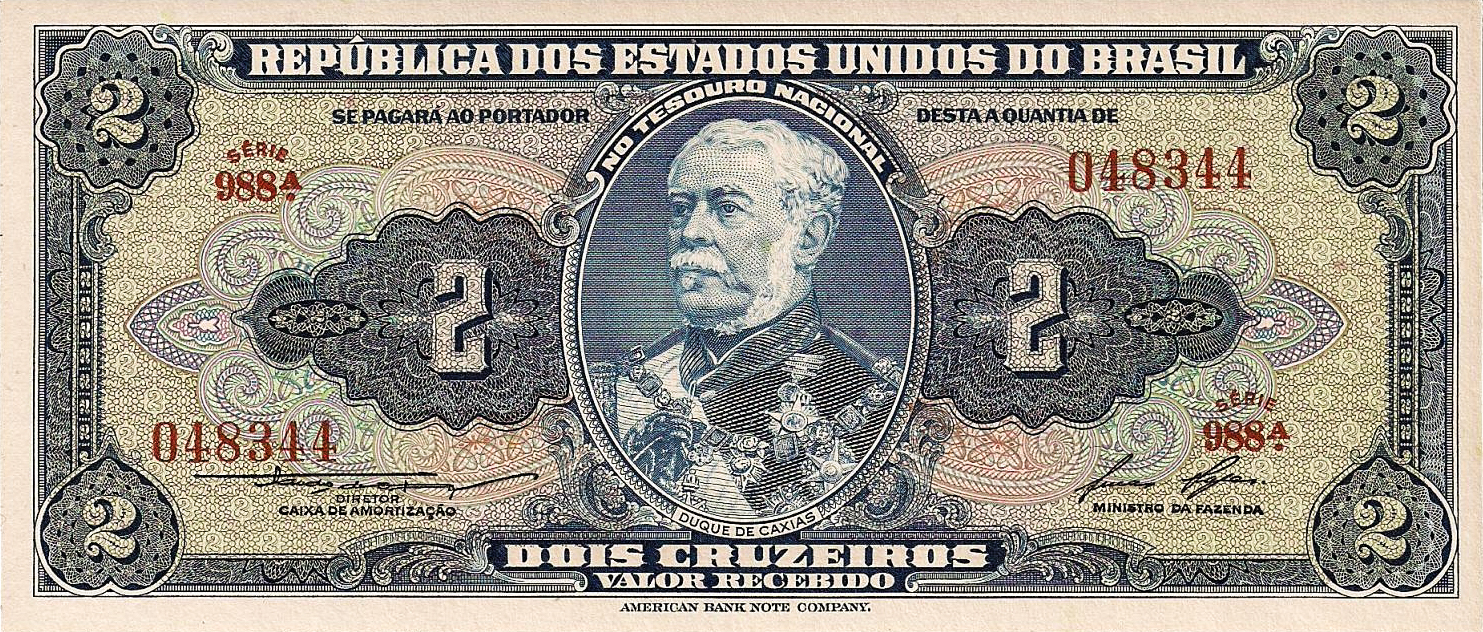
Cr$2 note, portraying the Duke of Caxias.

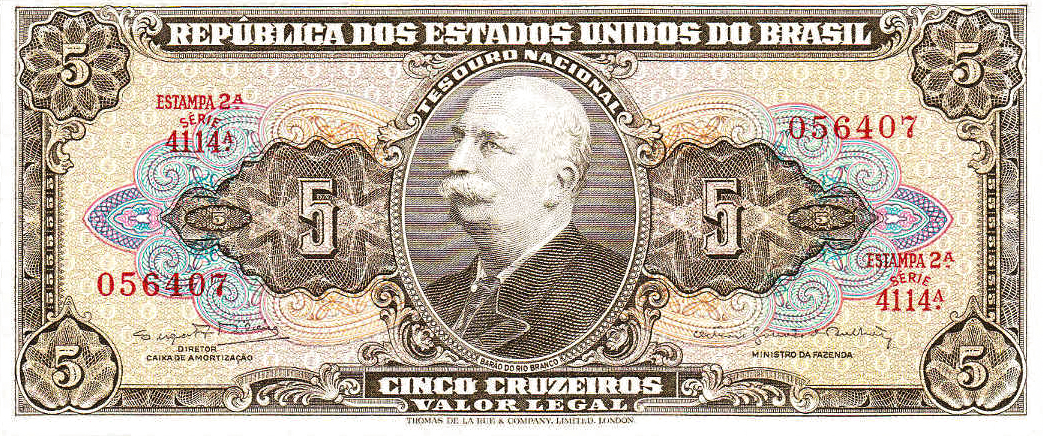
Cr$5 note, portraying the Baron of Rio Branco

In 1961, the third stamp of the Cr$5 banknote, called "Nota do Índio", would be released experimentally by the Casa da Moeda do Brasil. The very limited print run of this banknote issued in the years 1961 and 1962, as well as its low intrinsic value, made this banknote a true souvenir quite collected by numismatists.

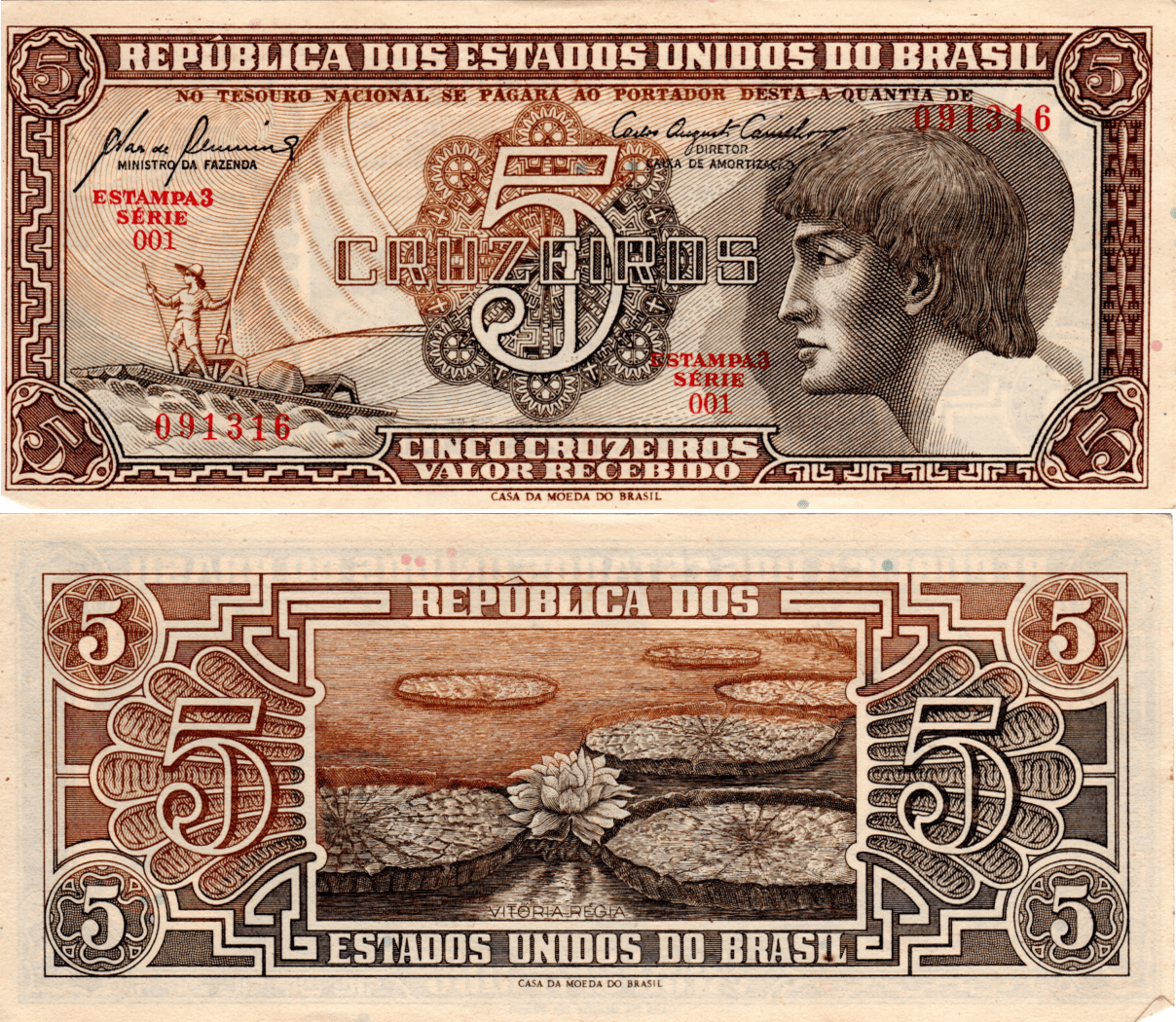
Cr$5 banknote issued in 1961 portraying indigenous people, a jangada and a vitória régia

In 1962, Law 4190 established that Cruzeiro banknotes would have the words "República dos Estados Unidos do Brasil", "Tesouro Nacional" and "Valor Legal" on the obverse of the banknotes and established the issuing of the Cr$5,000 banknote, which was put into circulation in 1963. In December 1964, law 4511 established the end of the centavos, the creation of Cr$1, Cr$2, Cr$5, Cr$10, Cr$20, Cr$50, Cr$100, Cr$200 and Cr$500 coins, as well as the issuing of the Cr$10,000 note, which would become the only banknote of the standard to be issued by the Central Bank of Brazil having the title "Banco Central" instead of the title "Tesouro Nacional" present in the other banknotes issued in this monetary standard.

The last banknotes of this standard had an equivalence stamp affixed from 1967 onwards with the corresponding value of the banknote in Cruzeiros Novos, being used provisionally in the transition between the banknotes produced abroad to new centavo coins that began to be minted from 1967 and the banknotes that would be produced mainly by Casa da Moeda do Brasil from 1970.

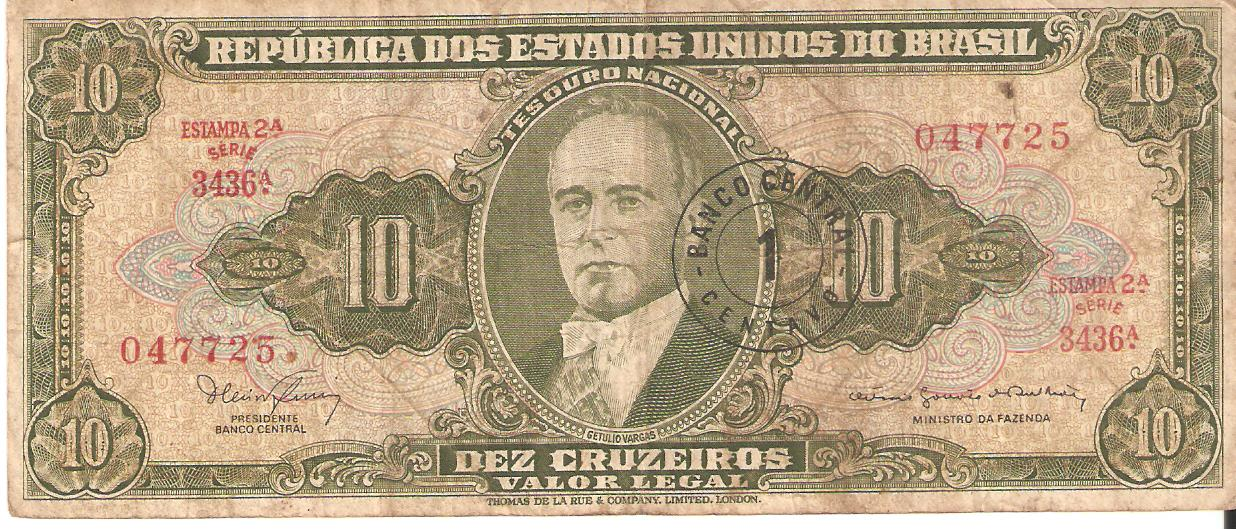
Cr$10 note, featuring Getúlio Vargas, with overstamp "1 centavo" or NCr$0.01 applied after 1967.

== See also ==
- Peso
- Dollar
- Portuguese escudo

== Notes ==
Brazilian cruzeiro (1st iteration)
Preceded by: Real (1st iteration); Reason: inflation Ratio: Rs 1$000 = Cr$1	Currency of Brazil; 1 November 1942 – 12 February 1967	Succeeded by: Cruzeiro (BRB); Reason: inflation Ratio: Cr$1,000 = NCr$1
