= O salário está baixo =

1986 article by Jair Bolsonaro in Veja

Image of the article

"O salário está baixo" (lit. 'The pay is low') is an article written by the then Brazilian Army Captain Jair Bolsonaro in 1986, published in the magazine Veja, where he criticized the low salaries of military personnel. The article caused a stir and made Bolsonaro a public figure, subsequently leading to his arrest for 15 days.

== Context ==
Jair Messias Bolsonaro joined the Army during the Brazilian military dictatorship, having graduated from the Military Academy of Agulhas Negras (AMAN) in 1977. He was part of the parachute team, having completed over 500 jumps and being in line for promotion to the rank of major. Documents produced by the Brazilian Army in the 1980s show that Bolsonaro's superiors assessed him as having an "excessive ambition to achieve financial and economic success."

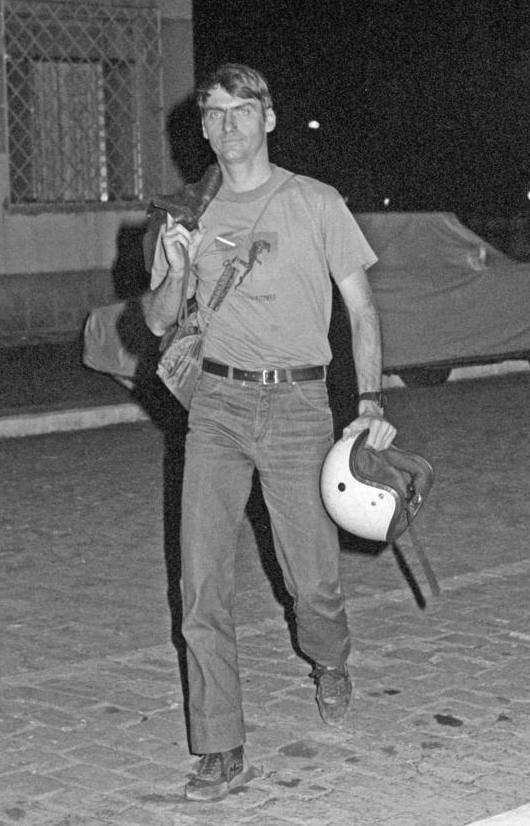
Jair Bolsonaro in 1986

In issue 939 of Veja, from the week of September 3, 1986, the article O salário está baixo was published in the Ponto de Vista section. In it, Bolsonaro, serving as a captain in the 8th Field Artillery Group, complained about a "critical situation" for military personnel regarding their salaries, which, according to him, were outdated due to inflation and a lack of adjustments. He noted that "a captain with eight to nine years in the rank earns [...] exactly 10,433 cruzados per month." He argued that this was the cause "for the departure, so far, of more than eighty cadets from AMAN. They requested to be discharged. They were not expelled, as the news suggests." Furthermore, he claimed that, with the exception of military personnel serving in Brasília—who had access to Army-owned houses with low rates—other military members suffered from high rents, as well as problems with their children's schools and other obligations. He ended the article by saying: "I am a Brazilian citizen who fulfills my duties, a patriot, and possessor of an excellent service record. Despite this, I cannot dream of the minimum necessities that a person of my cultural and social level could aspire to [...] Brazil above everything."

== Reactions ==
=== Military ===
The Army Minister, Leônidas Pires Gonçalves, initially declared that he considered the publication of O salário está baixo an "unacceptable act of indiscipline." He held meetings to discuss Bolsonaro's arrest, which was then carried out; Bolsonaro was imprisoned for 15 days for having allegedly committed a "serious transgression," accused of "having violated ethics, generating a climate of unrest within the military organization" and also "for having been indiscreet in addressing matters of an official nature." However, the attitude of his superiors also provoked a reaction from active and reserve officers. Bolsonaro received about 150 telegrams of solidarity, in addition to support from officers at the Instituto Militar de Engenharia (IME) and from officers' wives, who held a demonstration in front of the Praia Vermelha military complex in Rio de Janeiro. Colonel Bazarov was arrested for ten days for supporting a letter from his wife sent to a newspaper in Rio Grande do Sul applauding Bolsonaro's article, and was imprisoned for another eight days after reaffirming that military salaries were low. In 1988, he was acquitted by the Superior Military Court (STM).

=== External ===
With O salário está baixo, Bolsonaro made the debate about military salaries public, and gained national prominence. Until then, he had only been mentioned in a few news stories in the early 1970s, concerning his entry into the cadet school in the interior of São Paulo. Retrospectively, therefore, Migalhas assessed that the article marked the political birth of Bolsonaro.

The article had a significant impact in the magazine and in newspapers across Brazil, which reported on the turmoil caused by the article within the Army command. João Alberto Ferreira wrote an article for Jornal do Brasil criticizing O salário está baixo, noting: "Much lower than the salaries of the military are those of their civilian counterparts." Leonardo Mota Neto wrote to Correio Braziliense that the article "well expresses the courage with which the young Army officers face the salary issue and, by extension, the country's social drama." In another article for the same newspaper, Josemar Dantas wrote that O salário está baixo, "although resulting from an individual decision, in fact reflects the widespread discontent among military personnel with the drastic loss of their salaries' purchasing power."

== Bibliography ==
- Albuquerque, Afonso de (2020). "The Two Sources of the Illiberal Turn in Brazil". Brown Journal of World Affairs. 27 (2): 127-145.
- Nocera, Laura Alessandra (2019). "The Bolsonaro Presidency between Populist Electoral Propaganda and Authoritarian Degeneration". Poliarchie/Polyarchies. 2 (1): 282-304. doi:10.13137/2611-2914/29586.
- Silva, Daniel N. (2020). "A pragmática do caos: analisando a linguagem antidemocrática de Bolsonaro". Trabalhos em Linguística Aplicada. 59 (1): 507–537. doi:10.1590/01031813685291420200409. ISSN 2175-764X.
