= Brazilian cruzeiro (1990–1993) =

Brazilian currency from 1990 to 1993

- A 500,000 cruzeiros banknote from 1993, featuring Mário de Andrade on the obverse

ISO 4217
- Code: BRE

Units of account
- Base unit: cruzeiro
- Plural: cruzeiros
- Symbol: Cr$
- Subunit
- 1/100: centavo
- Plural
- centavo: centavos

Denominations
- Banknotes: Cr$50, Cr$100, Cr$200, Cr$500, Cr$1000, Cr$5000, Cr$10 000, Cr$50 000, Cr$100 000, Cr$500 000
- Coins: Cr$1, Cr$5, Cr$10, Cr$50, Cr$100, Cr$500, Cr$1000, Cr$5000

Demographics
- Date of introduction: 16 March 1990
- Replaced: Cruzado novo (BRN)
- Date of withdrawal: 1 August 1993
- Replaced by: Cruzeiro real (BRR)
- User(s): Brazil

Issuance
- Central bank: Central Bank of Brazil
- Website: www.bc.gov.br
- Printer: Casa da Moeda do Brasil
- Website: www.casadamoeda.com.br
- Mint: Casa da Moeda do Brasil
- Website: www.casadamoeda.com.br
- This infobox shows the latest status before this currency was rendered obsolete.

The cruzeiro was the currency of Brazil between 1990 and 1993. It was the third iteration of a Brazilian currency named "cruzeiro", and replaced the cruzado novo at par. It was used until 1993, when it was replaced by the cruzeiro real at a rate of 1 cruzeiro real = 1000 cruzeiros.

== History ==
In late 1989 and early 1990, inflation reached increasingly rampant levels, with monetary deterioration throwing most of the available resources into financial speculation. In an attempt to reduce this, President-elect Fernando Collor contacted President José Sarney, then at the end of his term and by mutual agreement, a bank holiday was announced from March 12 to 15. When President Collor took office, 80% of the amount deposited in the accounts, except for accounts that had a maximum value of 50,000 cruzados novos, had their value confiscated and frozen in the accounts for a period of 18 months, except in exceptional cases. The currency in circulation was renamed to cruzeiro and due to the economic shock, the economy went into recession at the time. At the time, the old cruzeiro banknotes (up to 10 centavos of cruzado novo) were withdrawn and cruzado banknotes still in circulation began to be withdrawn, and this process continued until the end of 1990. Despite the fact that inflation had reduced in relation to the levels it had in the early 1990s, the Collor Plan was not successful in reducing inflation to reasonable levels, and despite the shocks of the Plano Collor I in 1990 and the subsequent Plano Collor II in 1991, inflation remained high, and political instability made economic stabilization difficult, which was only possible with the advent of the Plano Real in 1994.

== Coins ==
The 1, 5, 10 and 50 centavo coins issued in 1989 for use with the previous currency continued in use after the introduction of the cruzeiro. In 1990, stainless-steel 1, 5, 10 and 50 cruzeiro coins were introduced, completing the coin family started in 1989. With the exception of the value of 1 cruzeiro, issued only in 1990, the other coins of this family were issued until 1992.

Standard circulating coins of the Cruzeiro (first family)
Reverse	Obverse	Value	Minting period	Obverse description
		Cr$1	1990	Portrays a section of the rhombus from the flag of Brazil
		Cr$5	1990–1992	Portrays a salt evaporation pond worker
		Cr$10	1990–1992	Portrays a rubber tapper and a factory plant
		Cr$50	1990–1992	Portrays a woman selling goods in a street market

In 1992, on the occasion of the Eco 92 in Rio de Janeiro, a new family of coins began to be issued. The coins of 100 and 500 cruzeiros coins were the first to be released, which would be accompanied by the 1000 cruzeiros coin, launched at the end of the same year. These coins were issued until 1993, when the cruzeiro real was launched.

Standard circulating coins of the Cruzeiro (second family)
Reverse	Obverse	Value	Minting period	Obverse description
		Cr$100	1992–1993	Portrays a manatee, and its Portuguese name in the lettering "Peixe-boi"
		Cr$500	1992–1993	Portrays a sea turtle, and its Portuguese name in the lettering "Tartaruga Marinha"
		Cr$1000	1992–1993	Portrays angelfish, and their Portuguese name in the lettering "Acará"

The cruzeiro only had one circulating commemorative coin, celebrating the 200th anniversary of Tiradentes's death (1792–1992).

Circulating commemorative coins of the Cruzeiro (1990–1993)
Reverse	Obverse	Value	Minting period	Description
		Cr$5000	1992	Portrays the bust of Tiradentes, and the lettering "Liberdade" (Liberty), "Cidadania" (Citizenship) and "Tiradentes"

Additionally, the cruzeiro also had two distinct non-circulating silver commemorative coins.

Non-circulating commemorative coins of the Cruzeiro (1990–1993)
Reverse	Obverse	Value	Minting period	Description
		Cr$500	1991	Commemorates the 500th anniversary (1492–1992) of the discovery of the Americas by the Europeans
(missing photo)	(missing photo)	Cr$2000	1992	Commemorates the UN Conference on Environment and Development, held in Rio de Janeiro in 1992

== Banknotes ==
The first banknotes were overprints on cruzado novo notes, in denominations of 50, 100, 200 and 500 cruzeiros and emergency banknote of 5000 cruzeiros.

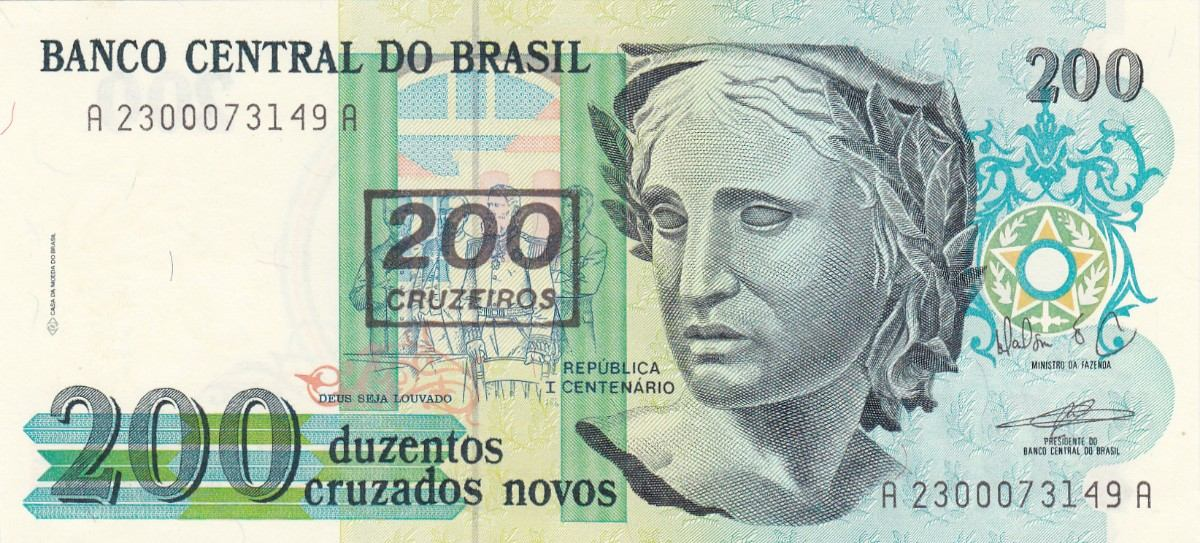
A NCz$200 note overstamped as Cr$200

In 1990, regular notes in values of 100, 200, 500, 1000 and 5000 cruzeiros were introduced, followed by 10,000 and 50,000 cruzeiros in 1991, 100,000 cruzeiros in 1992 and 500,000 cruzeiros in 1993. In 1992, the 50 and 100 cruzeiro banknotes were withdrawn and the higher denominations were withdrawn in 1994, although banknotes of up to 1000 cruzeiros have been seen very rarely since late 1993.

== Bibliography ==
- "O que foi o Plano Collor" [What the Collor Plan was]. Folha de S.Paulo (in Brazilian Portuguese). São Paulo. 16 March 2005.

Brazilian cruzeiro (BRE)
Preceded by: Cruzado novo (BRN); Reason: currency renaming Ratio: NCz$1 = Cr$1	Currency of Brazil; 16 March 1990 – 1 August 1993	Succeeded by: Cruzeiro real (BRR); Reason: inflation Ratio: Cr$1,000 = CR$1
