= Brazilian cruzeiro (1967–1986) =

Brazilian currency from 1967 to 1986

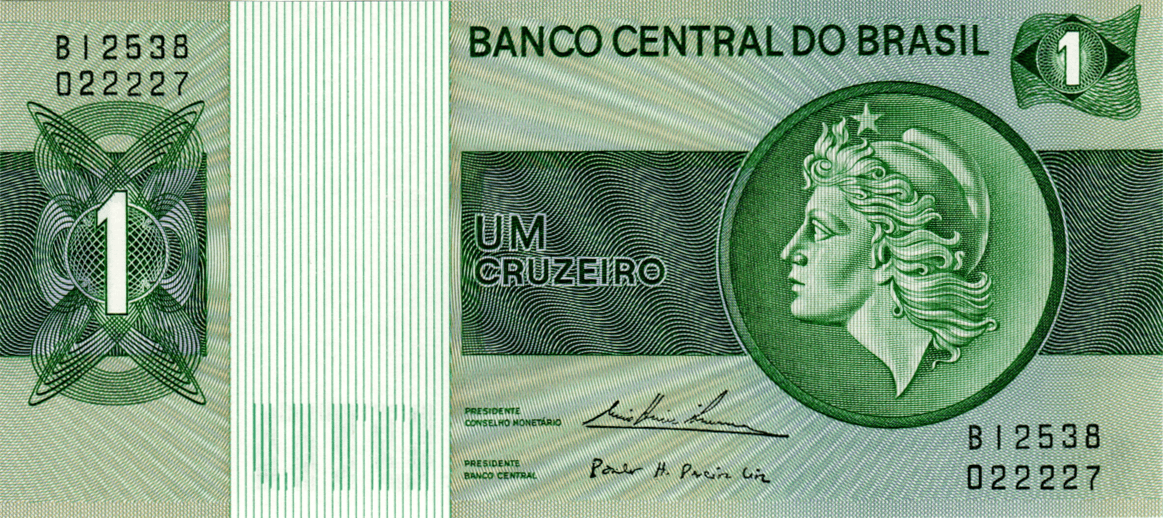
- A 1 cruzeiro banknote from 1975, featuring the effigy of the Republic on the obverse

ISO 4217
- Code: BRB

Units of account
- Base unit: cruzeiro novo (1967–1970) cruzeiro (1970–1986)
- Plural: cruzeiros novos (1967–1970) cruzeiros (1970–1986)
- Symbol: NCr$ (1967–1970); Cr$ (1970–1986)
- Subunit
- 1/100: centavo
- Plural
- centavo: centavos

Denominations
- Banknotes: 1, 5, 10, 50 centavos, Cr$1, Cr$5, Cr$10 (overstamped old cruzeiro notes); Cr$1, Cr$5, Cr$10, Cr$50, Cr$100, Cr$ 200, Cr$500, Cr$1000, Cr$5000, Cr$10 000, Cr$50 000, Cr$100 000 (regular cruzeiro "novo" notes)
- Coins: 1, 2, 5, 10, 20, 50 centavos, Cr$1, Cr$5, Cr$10, Cr$20, Cr$50, Cr$100, Cr$200, Cr$500

Demographics
- Date of introduction: 13 February 1967
- Replaced: Cruzeiro (1st iteration)
- Date of withdrawal: 28 February 1986
- Replaced by: Cruzado (BRC)
- User(s): Brazil (Military Rule, Sixth Republic)

Issuance
- Central bank: Banco Central do Brasil
- Printer: Casa da Moeda do Brasil (except for the provisional banknotes and supplementary issue of 50 million 100 cruzeiros banknotes in 1970 from series A00001 to A00500)
- Mint: Casa da Moeda do Brasil
- This infobox shows the latest status before this currency was rendered obsolete.

The cruzeiro, initially denominated cruzeiro novo (lit. 'new cruzeiro'), was the currency of Brazil between 1967 and 1986. It is the second of the 3 historical Brazilian currencies called "cruzeiro".

It was introduced as cruzeiro novo, with symbol NCr$, and remained with that denomination between 1967 and 1970 in the transition from the previous standard banknotes issued by American Bank Note Company and Thomas de la Rue to the new banknotes and coins issued mainly by Casa da Moeda do Brasil. It was introduced due to inflation and financial instability in the country, and had a conversion rate of 1 cruzeiro novo = 1000 "old" cruzeiros.

After the transition period for the Casa da Moeda do Brasil to be able to manufacture the new banknotes, the currency was renamed simply cruzeiro, with symbol Cr$.

The cruzeiro remained as the official currency until 1986, when it was replaced by the cruzado, at a rate of 1 cruzado = 1000 cruzeiros.

== History ==
=== Context ===
Until the 1960s, banknotes put into circulation in Brazil were, for the most part, made to order abroad, and eventual issues by the Casa da Moeda do Brasil were punctual, the main experiences being the issuance of banknotes in values between 1 mil-réis and 1 conto de réis for National Treasury banknotes in the early 1920s and later, 5 cruzeiros note issued in 1961, called the Indian note (nota do índio in Portuguese), which, due to its relative scarcity and very low face value, was treated as a souvenir.

Due to inflation, which accelerated in the 1950s and reached close to 100% a year in the mid-1960s, 1 and 2 cruzeiros banknotes were no longer issued in the late 1950s and coins in such amounts ceased to be issued in 1961, from then on, only banknotes were issued with values starting at 5 cruzeiros.

The centavo-coins in the early 1960s were in practice worthless and were demonetized by law in 1964. In the same law, there was a proposal that if there was the issue of coins to replace the then existing banknotes up to the value of 500 cruzeiros and the issue banknotes only in denominations of 1000, 5000 and 10000 cruzeiros. The first coins, launched by the Central Bank of Brazil in 1965 with values of 10, 20 and 50 cruzeiros were not very well accepted by the population.

Considering the currency redenominations by France and Chile in 1960, which would later launch the new franc and the escudo equivalent to 100 old francs and 1000 pesos respectively, there were a series of proposals for the redenomination of the currency, trying to avoid having the same problem with the cruzeiro that had occurred with the previous currency with its mil-réis (1000x) multiplier. Such proposals initially came from members of parliament and no consensus was reached.

=== Cruzeiro novo ===
With a bad reception to 10, 20 and 50 cruzeiros coins and due to the low value of the then-current Cruzeiro, the issuance of coins equivalent to values below 10 cruzeiros becomes excessively costly, on 13 November 1965, the "cruzeiro novo" was created as a transitional currency to replace the devalued "old" cruzeiro. It was set to be used until the Conselho Monetário Nacional (lit. 'National Monetary Council') decided the national currency could once again be called "cruzeiro".

The new currency would have parity with the "old" cruzeiro at a rate of 1000 cruzeiros = 1 cruzeiro novo. Banknotes in the values of 10, 50, 100, 500, 1000, 5000 and 10000 old cruzeiros received stamps with the values of 1, 5, 10, 50 Centavos, 1, 5 and 10 Cruzeiros Novos respectively. The 20 and 200 old Cruzeiro banknotes were not issued in the transition to the Cruzeiro Novo, but equivalent coins were issued to replace such banknotes.

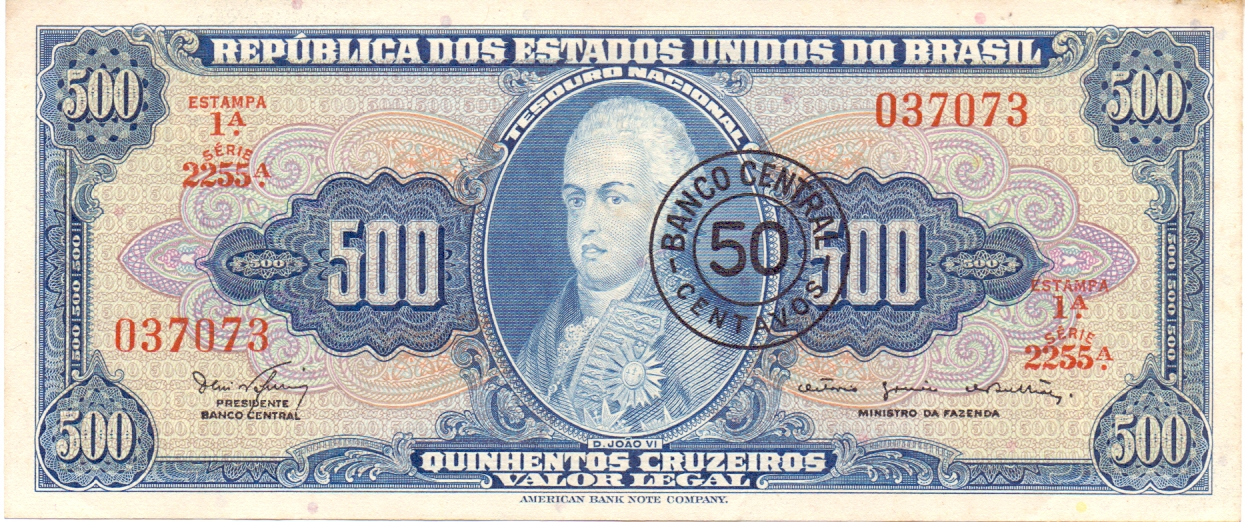
A 500 cruzeiro banknote, overstamped as a 0,50 (50 cents) cruzeiro novo note

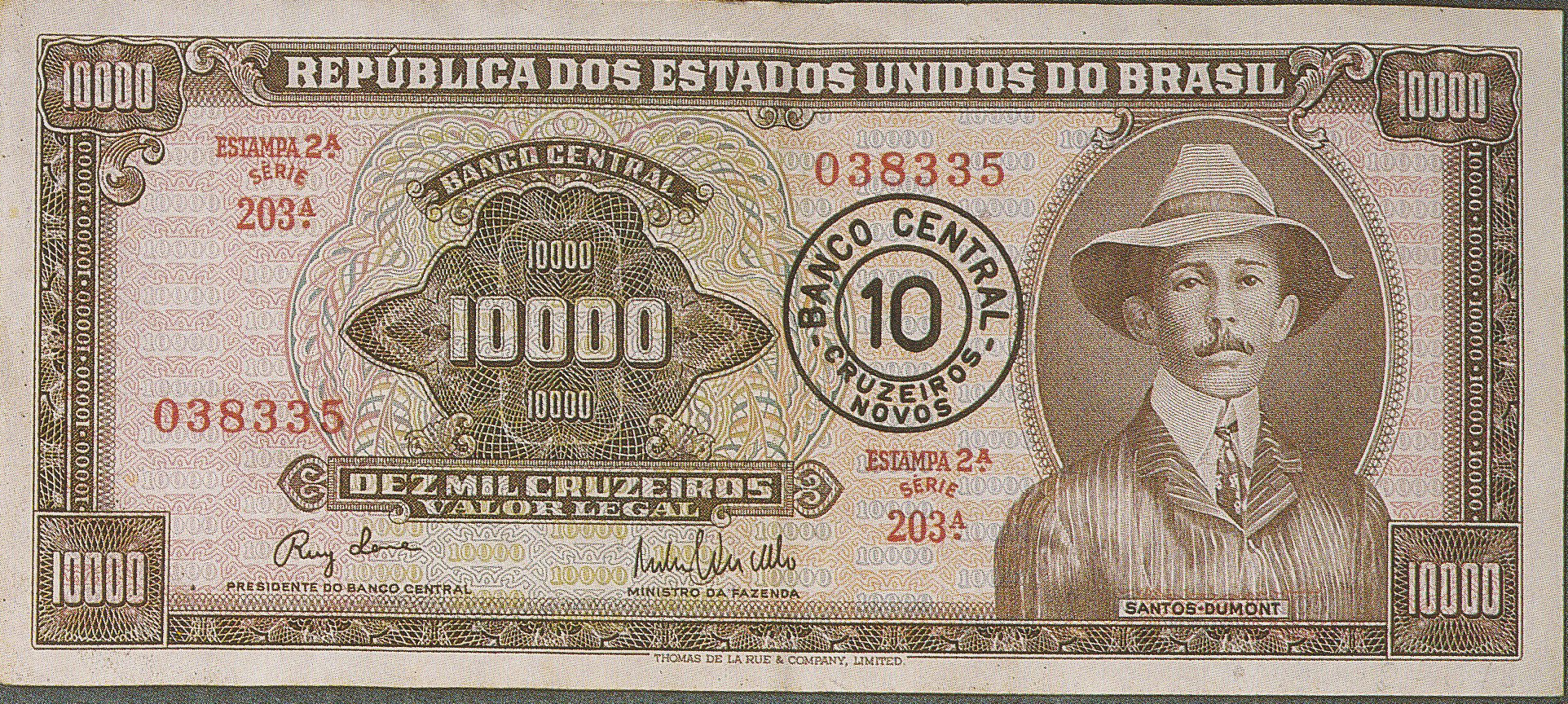
A 10,000 cruzeiro banknote, overstamped as a 10 cruzeiro novo note

=== Cruzeiro ===
On 31 March 1970, the Central Bank of Brazil announced new banknote designs, and published a resolution determining the national currency would once again be called "cruzeiro" – dropping the word "nôvo" – starting from 15 May 1970. On that date also began the withdrawal of cruzeiro novo banknotes, which could be exchanged for the updated notes and coins of the cruzeiro being implemented. New banknotes ones would be issued at pre-established values of 1, 5, 10, 50 and 100 cruzeiros.

The transition from the cruzeiro novo to the cruzeiro was set to end on 1 October 1970, when the "cruzeiro novo" name would officially become obsolete, and cruzeiro novo on checks and office documents.

The provisional bills then in circulation for the Cruzeiro Novo, as well as those still in circulation for the old Cruzeiro, ceased to have legal tender on 30 June 1972, when with a value equal to or less than 10 centavos, on 30 June 1973, when with a value between 20 centavos and 1 Cruzeiro, 30 June 1974, when worth 5 Cruzeiros and 30 June 1975, when worth 10 Cruzeiros.

In 1972, the 500 Cruzeiro banknote and a modified version of the 1 Cruzeiro banknote were launched. In 1973, a modified version of the 5 Cruzeiros banknote, rarely issued until then, would be released.

In 1978, the 1000 Cruzeiro banknote was launched, with a completely different model from the notes issued until then, and in 1979 modified versions of the 10 and 500 Cruzeiro notes were launched.

In 1981, a family of banknotes based on the model of the 1000 cruzeiros note of 1978 was launched, with banknotes worth 100, 200, 500, 1000 and 5000 cruzeiros being issued.

There would be no new changes in the currency until 1984, when banknotes of up to 50 cruzeiros lost their legal tender and banknotes of 10,000 and 50,000 cruzeiros were launched.

In 1985, the 100,000 Cruzeiro banknote was launched and the project for the 500,000 Cruzeiro note, scheduled to be launched in 1986, would not be launched due to the Cruzado Plan.

=== Withdrawal ===
In 1986, the country switched to the cruzado, at a rate of 1 cruzado = 1000 cruzeiros.

The 100, 200 and 500 Cruzeiro banknotes were withdrawn on 30 June 1987. The 1000 and 5000 Cruzeiro banknotes were withdrawn during Plano Verão in 1989.

Finally, banknotes of 10,000, 50,000 and 100,000 Cruzeiros (then 1, 5 and 10 centavos of the Cruzado Novo) were declared worthless during the Collor Plan.

== Coins ==
=== History ===
Six denominations of coins were issued from 1967 and some continued to be issued after the redenomination of the cruzeiro novo back to cruzeiro in 1970. Such denominations were 1, 2, 5, 10, 20 and 50 centavos. Although there was a project to launch the 1 cruzeiro coin together with the coins with values in centavos, in 1967 only proof coins were issued in such value, and the 1 cruzeiro coin would be launched together with the new banknotes in 1970.

The 1, 2 and 5 centavo coins would be issued until 1975 without changes except for the thickness of the coin, which is wider in the issue dated 1967 than in the other issues.

The 10, 20 and 50 centavo coins would undergo changes in the metal used and in details that would tend to have their design simplified over time, being issued until 1979.

The 1 cruzeiro coin of the first family, launched along with the banknotes of the new standard in 1970 would be issued until 1978, with reduced coinage in 1977 and 1978 due to the high cost of the metal.

In 1972, coins commemorating the 150th anniversary of Brazil's independence were issued in the values of 1, 20 and 300 cruzeiros in nickel, silver and gold respectively.

In 1975, a coin was launched to commemorate the 10th anniversary of the Central Bank of Brazil in silver worth 10 cruzeiros. In addition, in the same year, a new series of lighter 1, 2 and 5-cent coins was launched for the FAO campaign with sugar cane, soybean and a zebu ox illustrated on such coins, which came to be issued until 1978.

In 1979, the coins of the second cruzeiro family began to be released, with a very simplified design compared to the coins released between 1967 and 1970, with the 1 centavo coin with soybeans and the 1 cruzeiro coin with sugar cane. There was a project of coins with the values of 10 and 50 centavos in the second family, with the theme of aquatic fauna and cattle respectively, but these coins were never released, with rare proof units due to their low intrinsic value. All coins of 1, 2 and 5 centavos of the first family were withdrawn on 31 December 1980.

In 1980, 5 and 10 cruzeiros coins were released with illustrations of coffee plants and the 1964 Brazilian road plan respectively. In 1981, the last two coins of this family were released, with values of 20 and 50 cruzeiros illustration of the Church of São Francisco de Assis in São João del Rei and the master plan of Brasília respectively.

The 1 centavo coins of the second family were issued until 1983 and all centavo coins were withdrawn on 15 August 1984. The 1 and 5 cruzeiros coins were issued until 1984 without alteration and in a special FAO edition in 1985 and withdrawn with Plano Cruzado.

The others continued to be issued until 1986, when the Brazilian cruzado was launched, being launched at the end of 1985 coins of 100, 200 and 500 cruzeiros that would come to anticipate the model of the cruzado coins that would come to circulate from 1986.

All cruzeiro coins except the commemorative non-circulation coin of 300 cruzeiros (whose metallic and numismatic value of the coin was much higher than its face value) were withdrawn on 30 June 1987. This coin were declared worthless on 15 January 1989.

=== Cruzeiro novo and first cruzeiro series ===
Minting of the cruzeiro novo coins started in 1967, and they were put into circulation from 1968. Most of the first series of the cruzeiro were very similar in design, portraying the effigy of the Republic on the obverse, except commemorative 1 cruzeiro coin, issued in commemoration of the 150th anniversary of Brazil's independence in 1972.

All coins of this family began to be issued in 1967, except for the 1 Cruzeiro coin, which was only issued in proof versions with no monetary value dated 1967, and valid coins of such standard with such value only started to be issued from 1970 onwards.

First series of standard circulating coins of the Cruzeiro (1967–1986)
| Reverse | Obverse | Value | Minting period | Obverse description | Withdrawn |
|---|---|---|---|---|---|
| | | NCr$0.01; Cr$0.01 | 1967, 1969; 1975 | Portrays the effigy of the Republic | 31 December 1980 |
| | | NCr$0.02; Cr$0.02 | 1967, 1969; 1975 | Portrays the effigy of the Republic | 31 December 1980 |
| | | NCr$0.05; Cr$0.05 | 1967, 1969; 1975 | Portrays the effigy of the Republic | 31 December 1980 |
| | | NCr$0.10; Cr$0.10 | 1967; 1970, 1974–1979 | Portrays the effigy of the Republic | 15 August 1984 |
| | | NCr$0.20; Cr$0.20 | 1967; 1970, 1975–1979 | Portrays the effigy of the Republic | 15 August 1984 |
| | | NCr$0.50; Cr$0.50 | 1967; 1970, 1975–1979 | Portrays the effigy of the Republic | 15 August 1984 |
| | | N/A; Cr$1.00 | N/A; 1970, 1974–1978 | Portrays the effigy of the Republic | 28 February 1986 |

The series also had a few circulating commemorative coins.

First series of circulating commemorative coins of the Cruzeiro (1967–1986)
| Reverse | Obverse | Value | Minting period | Description | Withdrawn |
|---|---|---|---|---|---|
| | | Cr$0.01 | 1975–1978 | Celebrates the Food and Agriculture Organization | 31 December 1980 |
| | | Cr$0.02 | 1975–1978 | Celebrates the Food and Agriculture Organization | 31 December 1980 |
| | | Cr$0.05 | 1975–1978 | Celebrates the Food and Agriculture Organization | 31 December 1980 |
| | | Cr$1.00 | 1972 | Commemorates the 150th Anniversary of the Independence of Brazil (1822–1972) | 28 February 1986 |

Non-circulating commemorative coins were also minted.

First series of non-circulating commemorative coins of the Cruzeiro (1967–1986)
| Reverse | Obverse | Value | Minting period | Description |
|---|---|---|---|---|
| (missing photo) | (missing photo) | Cr$10.00 | 1975 | Commemorates the 10th anniversary of the Central Bank of Brazil (1964–1974) |
| (missing photo) | (missing photo) | Cr$20.00 | 1972 | Commemorates the 150th anniversary of the Independence of Brazil (1822–1972) |
| | | Cr$300.00 | 1972 | Commemorates the 150th anniversary of the Independence of Brazil (1822–1972) |

=== Second series ===
Due to inflation and currency devaluation, the cruzeiro gradually shifted towards higher and integer denominations. The second series reflected this, with common circulation coins of Cr$20 and Cr$50. Curiously, a Cr$0.01 (1 centavo) coin continued to be produced until 1983, even though it had little to no value at the time. In contrast, the 10 and 50 centavos coins had proof mintings, but were never released to the public; the second lowest denomination was the Cr$1 coin.

Second series of standard circulating coins of the Cruzeiro (1967–1986)
| Reverse | Obverse | Value | Minting period | Obverse description | Withdrawn |
|---|---|---|---|---|---|
| | | Cr$0.01 | 1979–1983 | Portrays soybeans | 15 August 1984 |
| Unreleased | Unreleased | Cr$0.10 | —N/a | Portrays a pair of fish | —N/a |
| Unreleased | Unreleased | Cr$0.50 | —N/a | Portrays an ox | —N/a |
| | | Cr$1.00 | 1979–1984 | Portrays sugarcanes | 28 February 1986 |
| | | Cr$5.00 | 1980–1984 | Portrays a coffee plant | 28 February 1986 |
| | | Cr$10.00 | 1980–1986 | Portrays a map of Brazil's main roads | 30 June 1987 |
| | | Cr$20.00 | 1981–1986 | Portrays the Church of São Francisco de Assis in Ouro Preto | 30 June 1987 |
| | | Cr$50.00 | 1981–1986 | Portrays the Plano Piloto, a map of Brasília | 30 June 1987 |

The second series also featured commemorative coins celebrating the Food and Agriculture Organization.

Second series of circulating commemorative coins of the Cruzeiro (1967–1986)
| Reverse | Obverse | Value | Minting period | Description | Withdrawn |
|---|---|---|---|---|---|
| | | Cr$1.00 | 1985 | Celebrates the Food and Agriculture Organization | 28 February 1986 |
| | | Cr$5.00 | 1985 | Celebrates the Food and Agriculture Organization | 28 February 1986 |

=== Third series ===
Similarly to the increase in value from each coin of the first series to the second series, the third series featured very high denominations of the cruzeiro.

Third series of standard circulating coins of the Cruzeiro (1967–1986)
| Reverse | Obverse | Value | Minting period | Obverse description | Withdrawn |
|---|---|---|---|---|---|
| | | Cr$100.00 | 1985–1986 | Portrays the coat of arms of Brazil | 30 June 1987 |
| | | Cr$200.00 | 1985–1986 | Portrays the coat of arms of Brazil | 30 June 1987 |
| | | Cr$500.00 | 1985–1986 | Portrays the coat of arms of Brazil | 30 June 1987 |

== Banknotes ==
Provisional banknotes with denominations of 10, 50 and 100 cruzeiros issued by Thomas de la Rue and denominations of 500, 1000 and 5000 cruzeiros issued by the American Bank Note Company were overstamped with the equivalent value in cruzeiros novos and remained legal tender after being officially overstamped by Central Bank of Brazil with their value in new currency, 1/1000 of their face value until its replacement.

In addition, banknotes of 10,000 cruzeiros, made to order abroad and which were released into circulation in 1966, were issued in most cases with the aforementioned equivalence stamp, with only a few series issued by the American Bank Note Company not being overstamped with value of 10 cruzeiros novos.

Such banknotes, together with those issued in the previous standard, were replaced by coins in the values of 1, 2, 5, 10, 20 and 50 centavos that began to be issued in 1967, as well a new coin of 1 cruzeiro and new banknotes that came to be issued mainly by Casa da Moeda do Brasil in amounts of 1, 5, 10, 50 and 100 cruzeiros from 1970 to 1980. At the time the word "novo" was absent from the coins and banknotes launched, as already anticipated in Resolution 47, which would establish the new currency.

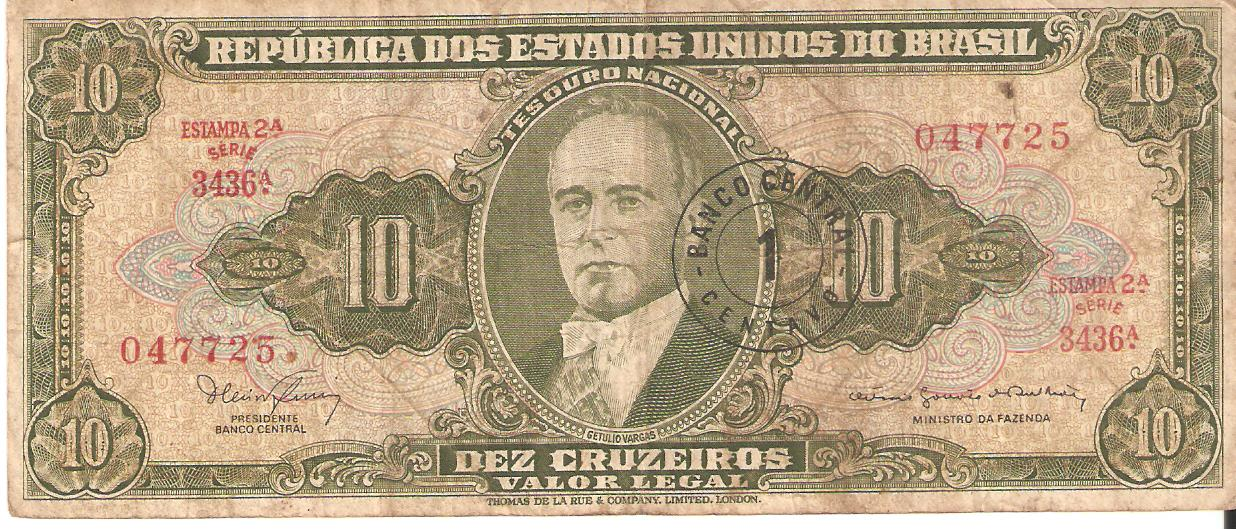
A Cr$10 note overstamped with the text "1 centavo", indicating it was now worth NCr$0.01

To define the new graphic design of the new Cruzeiro banknotes to be issued by the Casa da Moeda do Brasil, a contest was held to choose the graphic design for the new banknotes, with the participation of several Brazilian designers, such as Alexandre Wollner, Waldir Gramado, Benedito de Araujo Ribeiro, Petrarca Amenta, Zélio Bruno da Trindade, Gustavo Goebel Wayne Rodrigues and Ludivico Martino. The contest was won by Aloísio Magalhães, whose work presented constitutes a renewal and a substantial change in the banknotes, which would be issued in the country.

Aloísio would be responsible for the graphic design of the banknotes of the first family of the "new" Cruzeiro, which would be issued from 1970 to 1980, with the original values of 1, 5, 10, 50 and 100 cruzeiros, with the addition of the 500 cruzeiros in 1972 with motivation related to the ethnic formation of the Brazilian people, as well as the second family of banknotes, whose cornerstone was the 1000 cruzeiros note from 1978, which would be released in 1981 with values of 100, 200, 500 and 5000 cruzeiros, in addition to a redesign of the 1000 cruzeiros banknote, with banknotes of 100, 200 and 500 cruzeiros being issued until 1984 and banknotes of 1000 and 5000 cruzeiros were issued until 1985, exceeding their lifetime of the designer, who died in 1982.

In 1984, the first banknotes without the Aloísio Magalhães project would be released, which would be the 10,000 and 50,000 cruzeiros banknotes and which, together with the 100,000 cruzeiros banknote issued in 1985, form the third family of definitive cruzeiro banknotes, that would anticipate the features of the cruzado banknotes, which would be released in 1986. The last banknotes of that family received the equivalence stamp in Cruzados while new banknotes similar to the same ones with the value in Cruzados were not issued.

The banknotes of the first family of cruzeiro vary in size between the banknotes, the smallest of the banknotes being the 1-cruzeiro banknote with 147 mm in length and 66 mm in width. The others (5, 10, 50, 100 and 500 cruzeiros) present an increment of 5 mm in length and 3 mm in width in relation to the banknote with a value immediately below. The second family and third family banknotes of cruzeiro have a standardized size of 154 x 74 mm.

The definitive banknotes of this monetary standard would be issued mainly by the Casa da Moeda do Brasil, at the time being issued abroad only a supplementary order of 50 million banknotes by Thomas de la Rue in the amount of 100 cruzeiros of the new standard in 1970, and there would be no new issuance of banknotes abroad until 1994, when the Real was launched as the Brazilian currency.

Provisional banknotes and old cruzeiro notes up to 10 centavos were withdrawn on 30 June 1972 (after two adjournments, the first deadline being 1 October 1970 and the second deadline being 30 June 1971), followed by withdrawal of provisional banknotes and old cruzeiro banknotes up to 1 cruzeiro "novo" on 30 June 1973, withdrawal of provisional and old cruzeiro banknotes of 5 and 10 cruzeiros "novos" on 30 June 1974 and 30 June 1975 respectively.

Banknotes up to 50 cruzeiros were withdrawn on 29 June 1984 and banknotes up to 500 cruzeiros were withdrawn on 30 June 1987. Banknotes of 1,000 and 5,000 cruzeiros were withdrawn on 15 January 1989 and other denominations were withdrawn with Plano Collor.

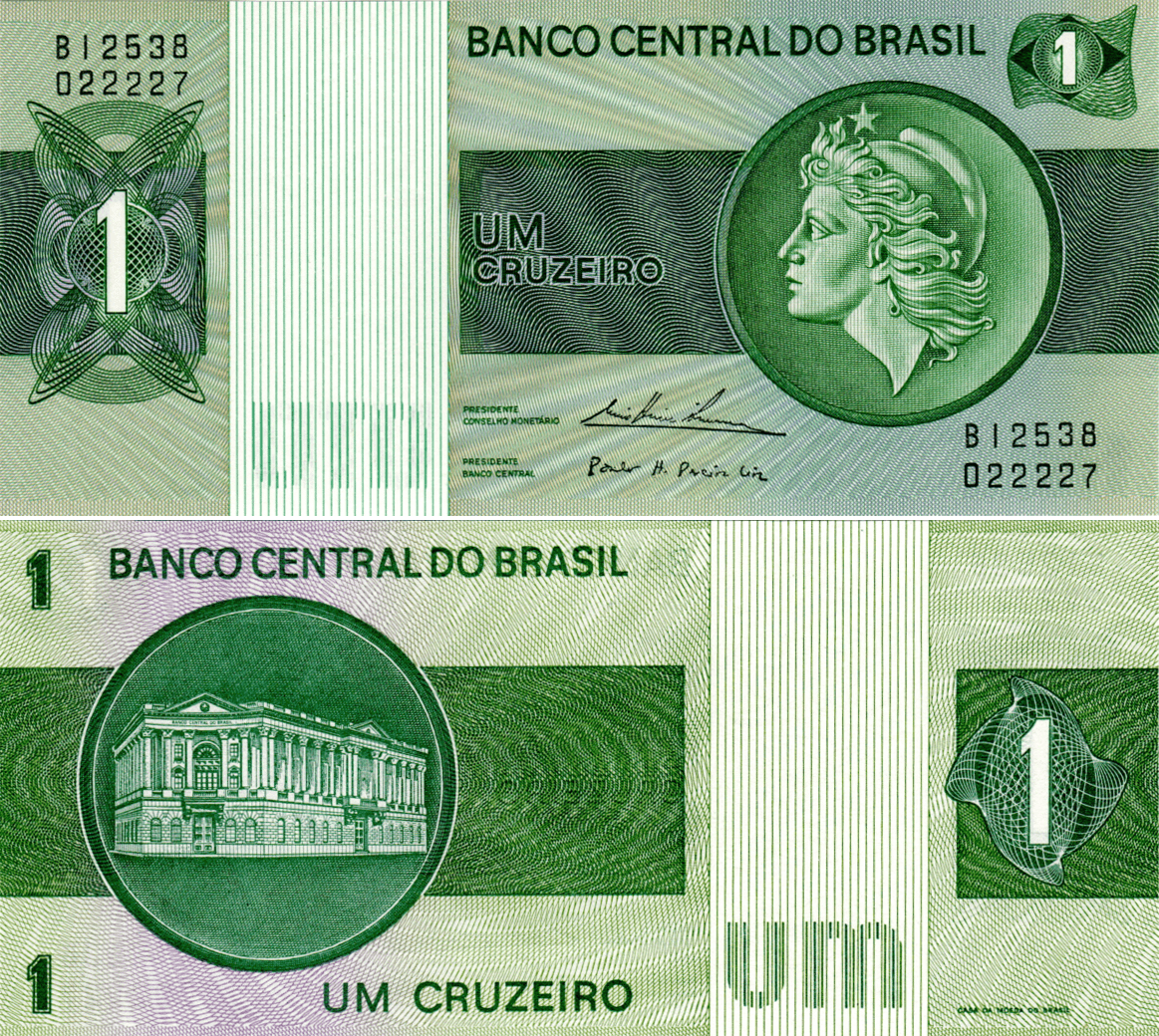
A Cr$1 banknote, from 1970

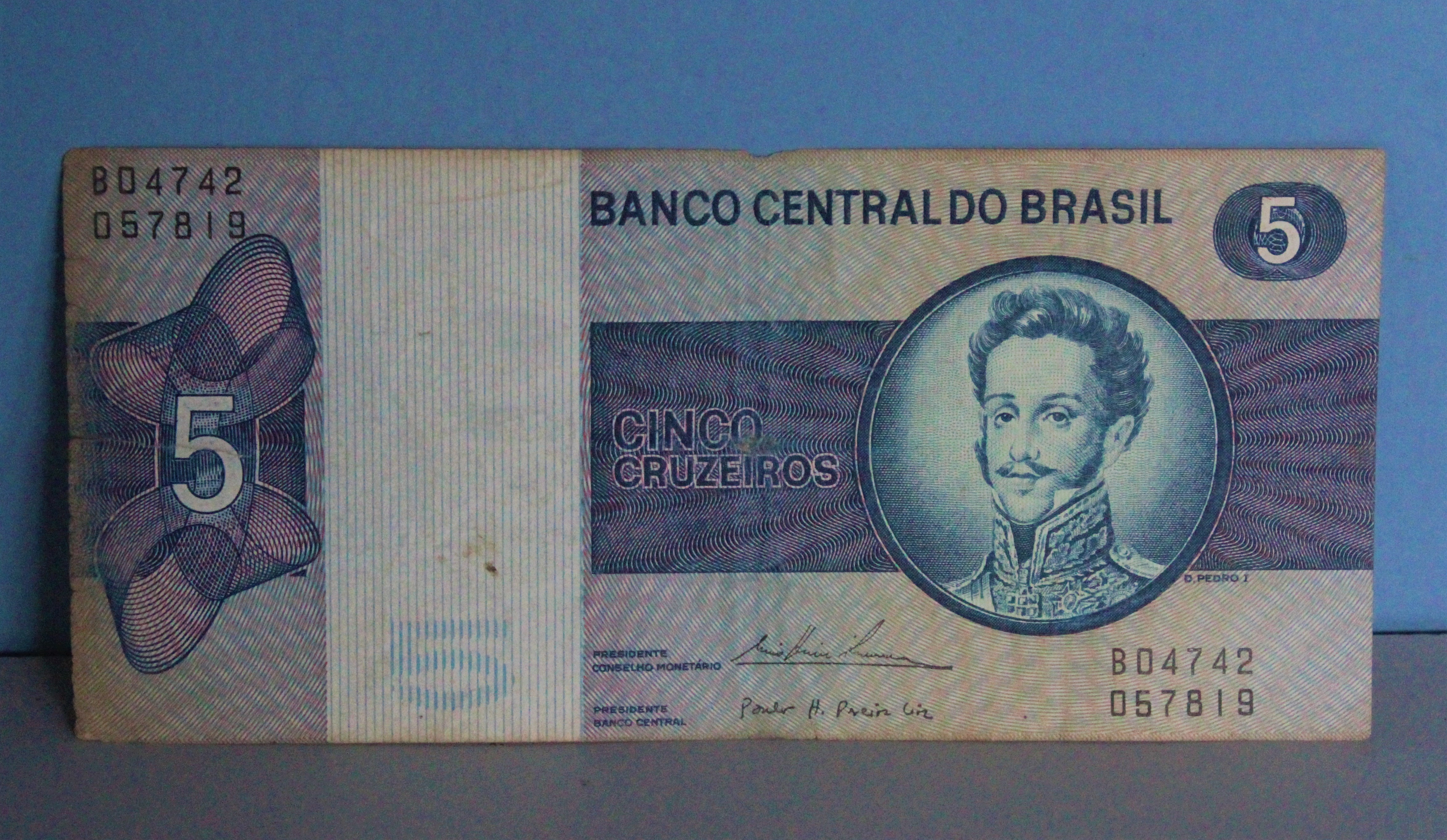
Obverse of a Cr$5 note, from 1970, featuring Dom Pedro I

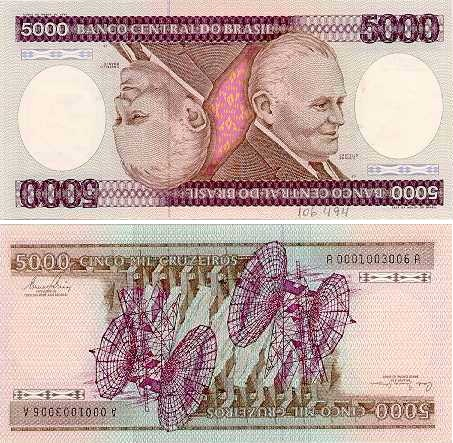
A 1981 Cr$5,000 note portraying Castelo Branco

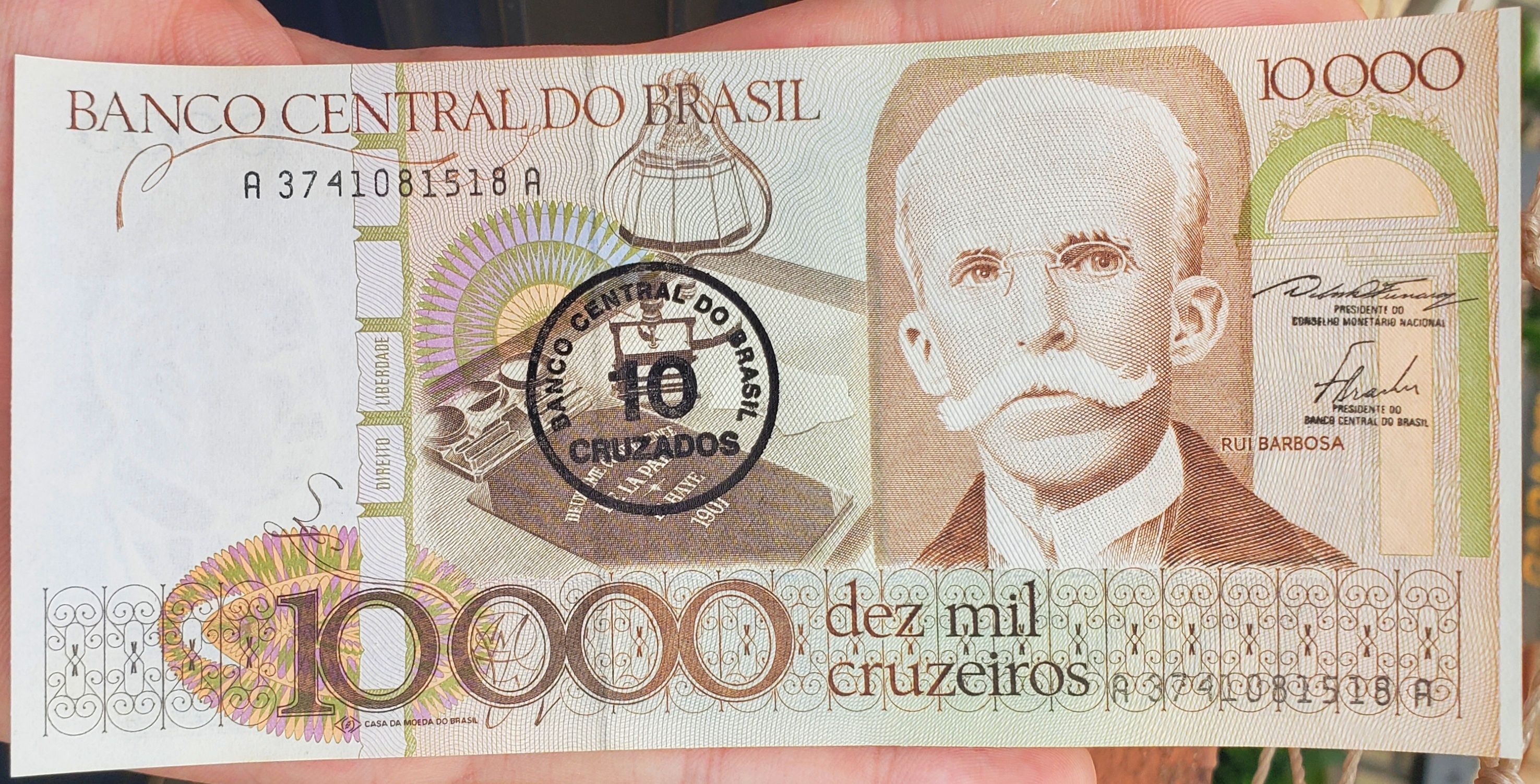
Obverse of the Cr$10,000 note featuring Ruy Barbosa, overstamped as Cz$10

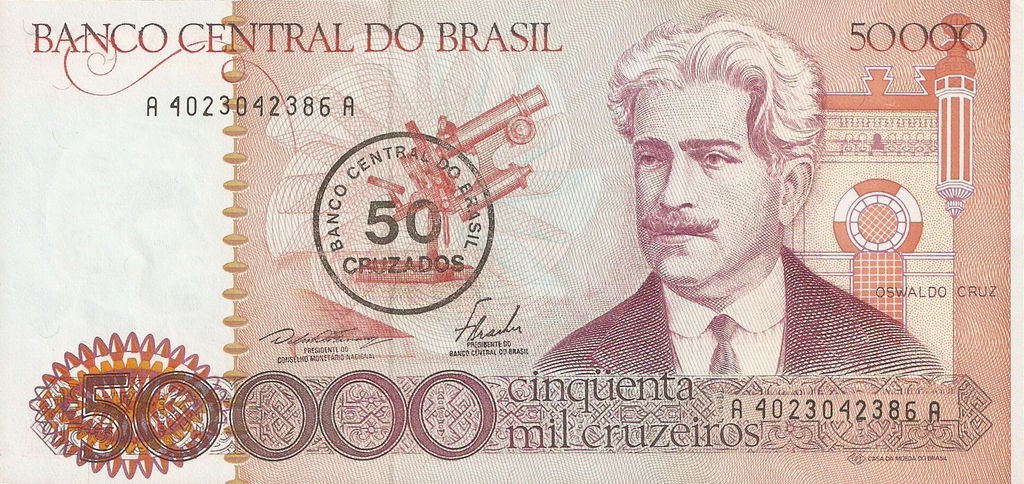
Obverse of the Cr$50,000 note featuring Oswaldo Cruz, overstamped as Cz$50

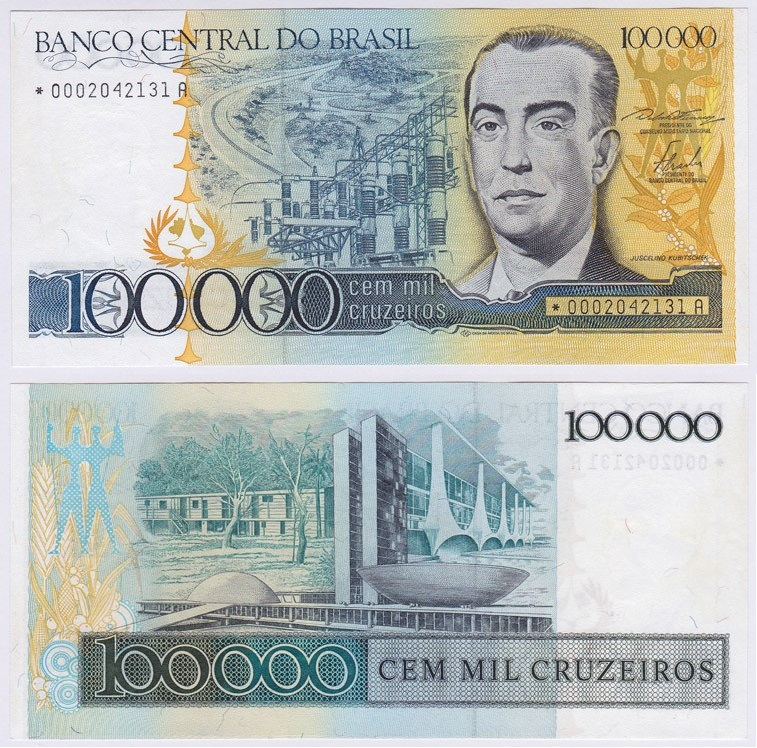
Highest denomination cruzeiro note, a Cr$100,000 note from 1985, portraying Juscelino Kubitschek

== Bibliography ==
- Rodrigues, Natália. "Cruzeiro Novo – História do Brasil" [Cruzeiro Novo – History of Brazil]. InfoEscola (in Brazilian Portuguese).

Brazilian cruzeiro (BRB)
| Preceded by: Cruzeiro (1st iteration); Reason: inflation Ratio: Cr$1,000 = NCr$1 | Currency of Brazil; 13 February 1967 – 28 February 1986 | Succeeded by: Cruzado (BRC); Reason: inflation Ratio: Cr$1,000 = Cz$1 |
