= Brazilian cruzado novo =

Brazilian currency from 1989 to 1990

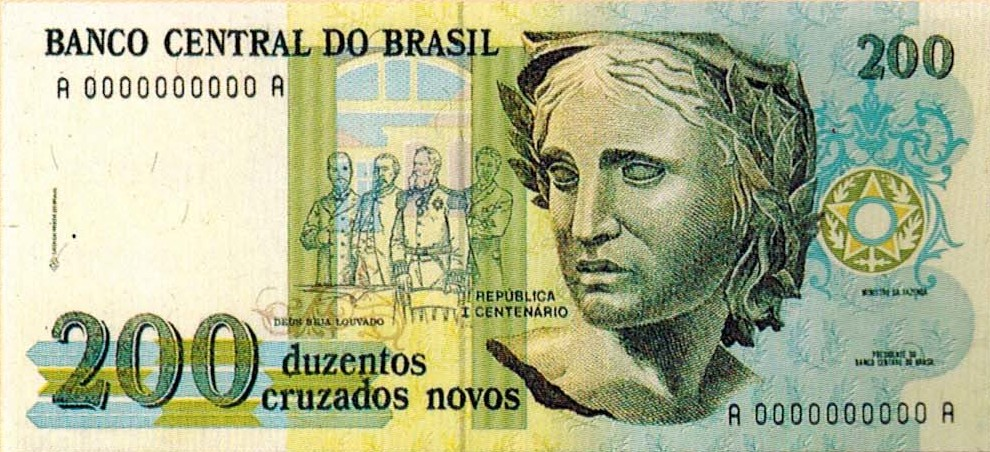
- A 200 cruzados novos banknote from 1989, commemorating the 100th anniversary of the Proclamation of the Republic on the obverse

ISO 4217
- Code: BRN

Units of account
- Base unit: cruzado novo
- Plural: cruzados novos
- Symbol: NCz$
- Subunit
- 1/100: centavo
- Plural
- centavo: centavos

Denominations
- Banknotes: NCz$1, NCz$5, NCz$10 (overstamped old cruzado notes); NCz$50, NCz$100, NCz$200, NCz$500 (regular cruzado novo notes)
- Coins: 1, 5, 10, 20, 50 centavos, NCz$1

Demographics
- Date of introduction: 15 January 1989
- Replaced: Cruzado (BRC)
- Date of withdrawal: 15 March 1990
- Replaced by: Cruzeiro (BRE)
- User(s): Brazil

Issuance
- Central bank: Central Bank of Brazil
- Website: www.bc.gov.br
- Printer: Casa da Moeda do Brasil
- Website: www.casadamoeda.com.br
- Mint: Casa da Moeda do Brasil
- Website: www.casadamoeda.com.br
- This infobox shows the latest status before this currency was rendered obsolete.

The cruzado novo was the short-lived currency of Brazil between 15 January 1989 and 15 March 1990. It replaced the cruzado in the rate of 1000 cruzados = 1 cruzado novo. It had the symbol $\mathrm{NCzS}\!\!\!\Vert$ and the ISO 4217 code BRN. In 1990, the cruzado novo was renamed the (third) cruzeiro. This currency was subdivided in 100 centavos.

The redenomination was the result of Plano Verão, which would become one of several heterodox plans in an attempt to stabilize the currency, and the path of redenomination was used to try to circumvent possible legal challenges due to rights established in the currency at that time, as happened in the Bresser Plan.

The method of monetary redenomination would be used again in 1990, when Fernando Collor de Mello assumed the presidency, and this redenomination to cruzeiro was on par with this currency then in circulation, despite the even darker effects of such an economic plan.

Unlike the cruzeiro novo denomination of the late 1960s, it was not a transitional pattern between two currency denominations of the same name. Banknotes and coins with that denomination were released in 1989 and 1990.

== Coins ==
=== Standard ===
Standard circulating stainless-steel coins were issued in denominations of 1, 5, 10 and 50 centavos.

A design for a standard circulation NCz$1 coin was planned for 1990, nicknamed the "Christ's Cross" (Portuguese: Cruz de Cristo) design. However, in March 1990, before the coin was released to the public, the country's currency changed to the Cruzeiro (3rd iteration), so that design never circulated. There are 41 specimens in the Central Bank of Brazil's internal storage, of which there are forty 1990 issues, and a single 1989 issue, the only known specimen of that year. Additionally, there are 15 known samples with collectors, bringing the total to 56 known issues of the coin.

Coins of the Cruzado Novo
Reverse	Obverse	Value	Details
		NCz$0.01	The "Boiadeiro" design, portrays a cowboy or cattle herder.
		NCz$0.05	The "Pescador" design, portrays a fisherman.
		NCz$0.10	The "Garimpeiro" design, portrays an artisanal miner.
		NCz$0.50	The "Rendeira" design, portrays a lacemaker or weaver.
Unreleased	Unreleased	NCz$1	The "Cruz de Cristo" design, portrays a cross inside a map of Brazil.

=== Commemorative ===
To celebrate the 100th anniversary of the Republic in Brazil (1889–1989), two Cruzado Novo coins were minted: a NCz$1 circulating coin, and a NCz$200 non-circulating silver coin.

Commemorative coins of the Cruzado Novo
Reverse	Obverse	Value	Details
		NCz$1	Circulating stainless steel commemorative coin
		NCz$200	Non-circulating silver commemorative coin

== Banknotes ==
The first banknotes were overprints on cruzado notes, in denominations of 1, 5 and 10 cruzados novos. Regular notes followed the same year in denominations of 50, 100 and 200 cruzados novos, with the 500 cruzado novo note following in 1990. These banknotes were overprinted with the new name of the currency in 1990. In 1992, the 50 and 100 cruzado novo banknotes were withdrawn. The higher denominations were withdrawn in 1994.

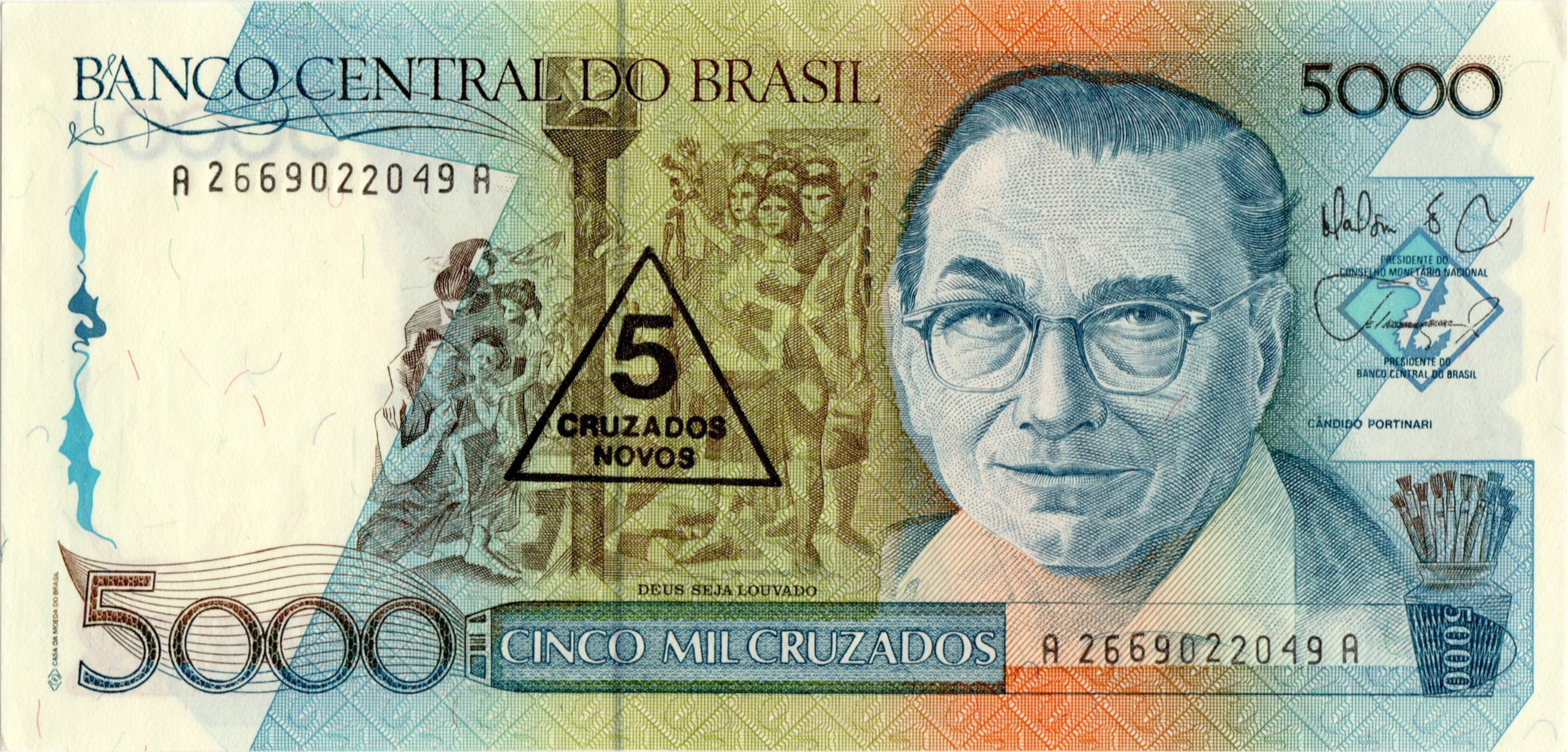
A Cz$5,000 banknote overstamped as NCz$5, portraying Candido Portinari

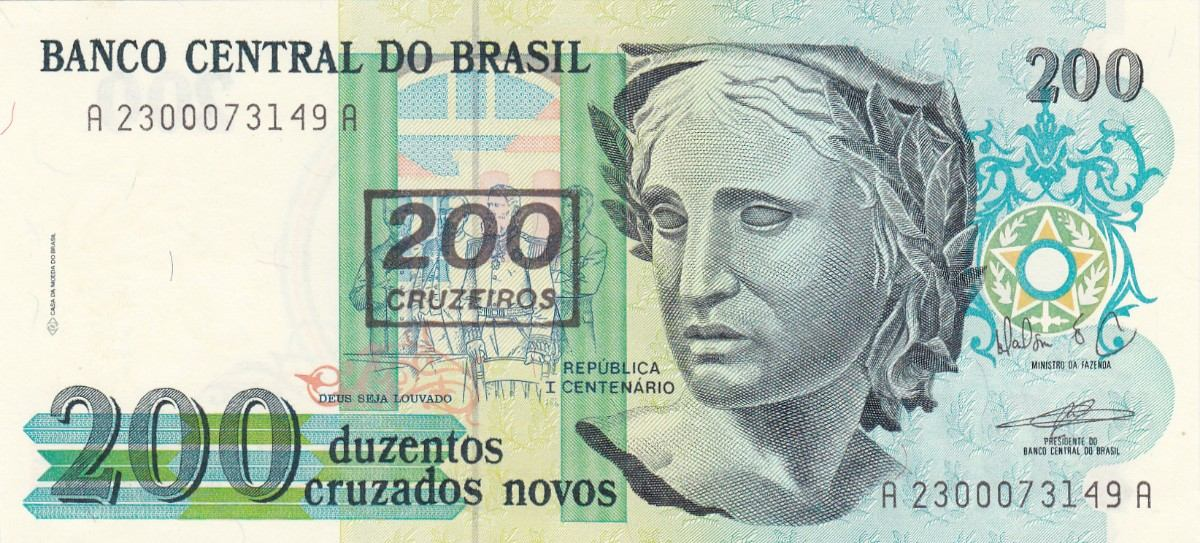
A NCz$200 banknote overstamped as Cr$200, commemorating the 100th anniversary of the Proclamation of the Republic

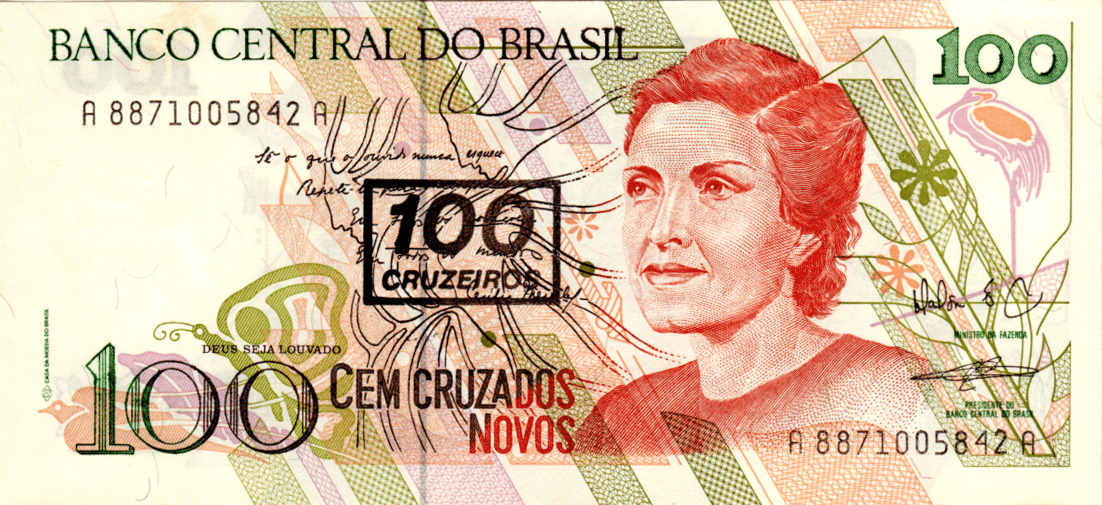
A NCz$100 banknote overstamped as Cr$100, portraying Cecília Meireles

Brazilian cruzado novo (BRN)
Preceded by: Cruzado (BRC); Reason: inflation Ratio: Cz$1,000 = NCz$1	Currency of Brazil; 15 January 1989 – 15 March 1990	Succeeded by: Cruzeiro (BRE); Reason: currency renaming Ratio: NCz$1 = Cr$1
