= Coins of the Chilean peso =

The Chilean peso (Spanish: peso chileno) currently has 6 denominations of coins, which are 1, 5, 10, 50, 100, and 500 pesos. Its subdivision is the centavo (Spanish: centavo chileno), but centavo coins were only minted until 1979. The coins were first minted in 1975. The peso and centavo replaced the Chilean escudo and centesimo respectively. The latter currency was Chile's national currency from 1960 to 1975.

The centavo had an equivalent value to the American Penny, but due to rampant inflation in the late 1970s, which reached as high as 211% in 1976, the centavo became obsolete, alongside the lower denominations of the Chilean peso. Minting of centavo coins stopped in 1979, and the subdivision ceased being legal tender in 1983.

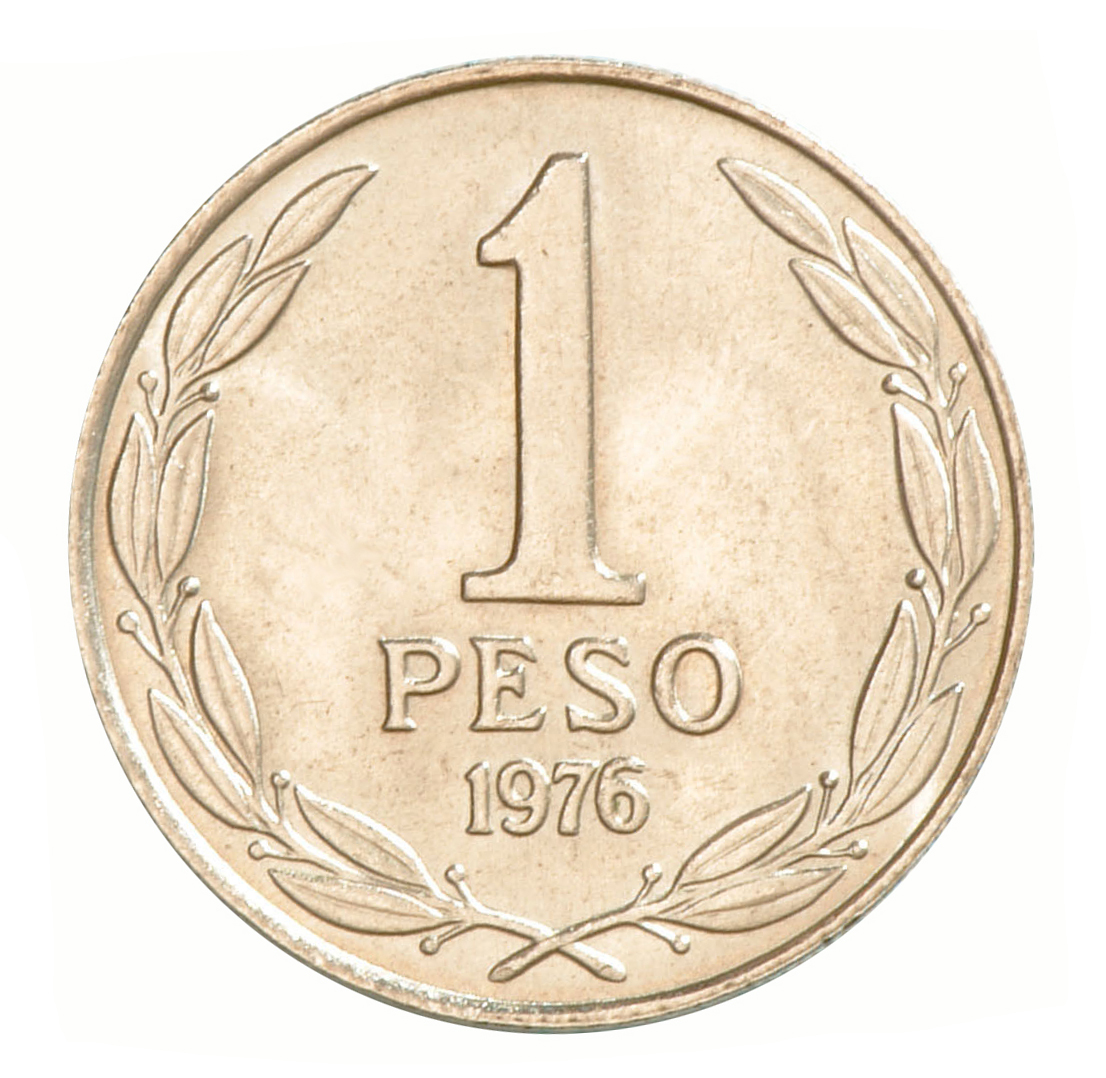
Obverse of a 1976 1 peso

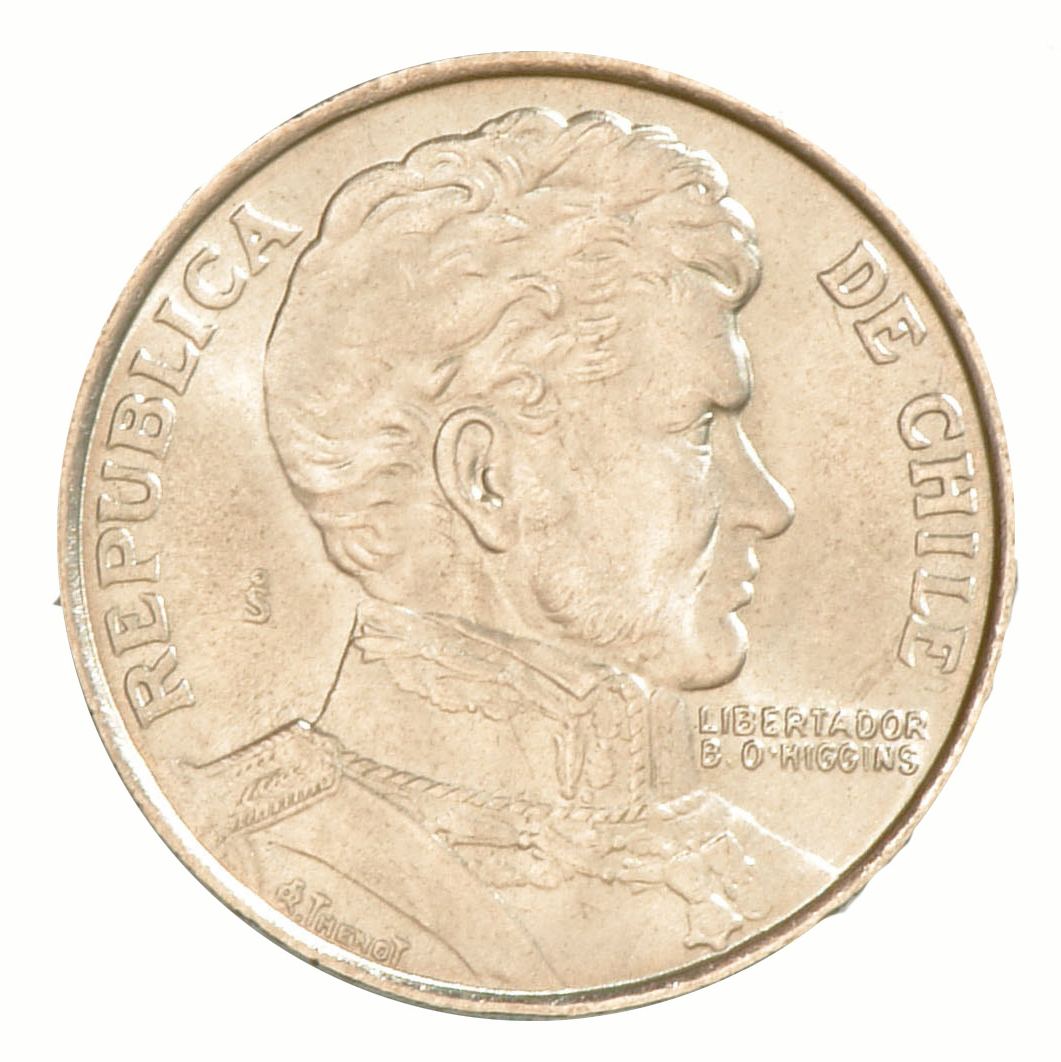
Reverse of a 1976 1 peso

== Design ==
The design on the obverse of all the coins look very similar to the modern coin in circulation, with the denomination in big numbers, and the name of the currency under the denomination, together with the year it was minted being under the name of the currency. The reverse of centavo coins depicts a condor, the national bird of Chile, standing on top of a rock with its wings semi-open as if it were warming its body up. The image of the condor used in the reverse is the same as the design of the reverse of the coins of the first peso. Coins worth 1-50 pesos feature the portrait of Bernardo O'Higgins on the reverse, while 5 and 10 pesos minted from 1976 to 1990 feature a woman representing freedom.

The 1 and 50 centavo, 1, 10, 100 and 500 peso and the older 5 peso coins are shaped like a circle while the 5 and 10 centavo and 5 and 50 peso coins are in the shape of a dodecagon.

In 1975, 1 centavos were made of aluminium, the 5 and 10 of aluminium bronze, but these two were changed to aluminium the next year. The 50 centavo was made from the same material as the 5 and 10 peso coins, aluminium bronze, which looks like gold. The 1 centavo was discontinued in its first year, 1975, with the 5 centavo following it the next year. 10 and 50 centavos were discontinued in 1979. 5 and 10 peso coins were first minted in 1976, the 50 and 100 in 1981, and the 500 peso coin in 2000.

=== 50 Chilean Pesos Coin ===
The 50 Chilean Pesos coin features a portrait of Bernardo O'Higgins, a notable figure in Chile's fight for independence from Spanish colonial rule. O'Higgins is honored as a national hero due to his leadership and efforts during the Chilean War of Independence. His image on the coin commemorates his significant contributions to Chile's history.

== History ==
After the escudo was replaced by the second peso in 1975, the centavo was introduced alongside it. It had, at the start of 1975, an equivalent value to the American Penny. The centavo was worth 1/100 of a peso, therefore it was reliant on the value of the peso to maintain any sort of use as currency.

After the peso and centavo were introduced, their value fell by 300% in the first two years of circulation, as money had to be printed for it to enter general circulation, and the peso wasn’t at the time pegged to the dollar but a free-floating currency, its value fell. The loss of value was exacerbated by the Chilean Crisis of 1982, during the years of the crisis (1982-1985), the peso lost 164.78% of its value compared to the dollar.

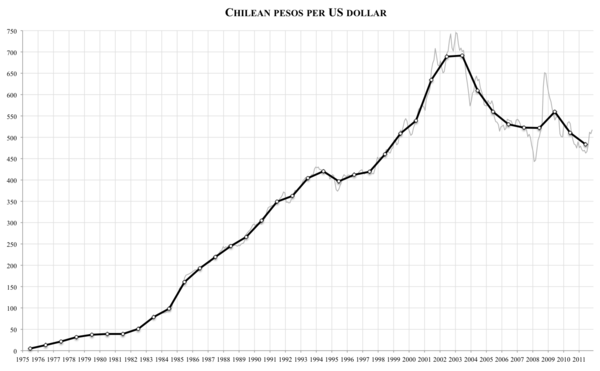
Worth of a US dollar in pesos

From 1975 to 1983 (the period of time in which the centavo was in circulation), the peso lost 884.1% of its value, meaning that while a centavo in 1975 had a value of one penny, in 1983 that same centavo would have had the value of 0.001 (1/1000) of a penny.
