= Brazilian cruzado =

Brazilian currency from 1986 to 1989

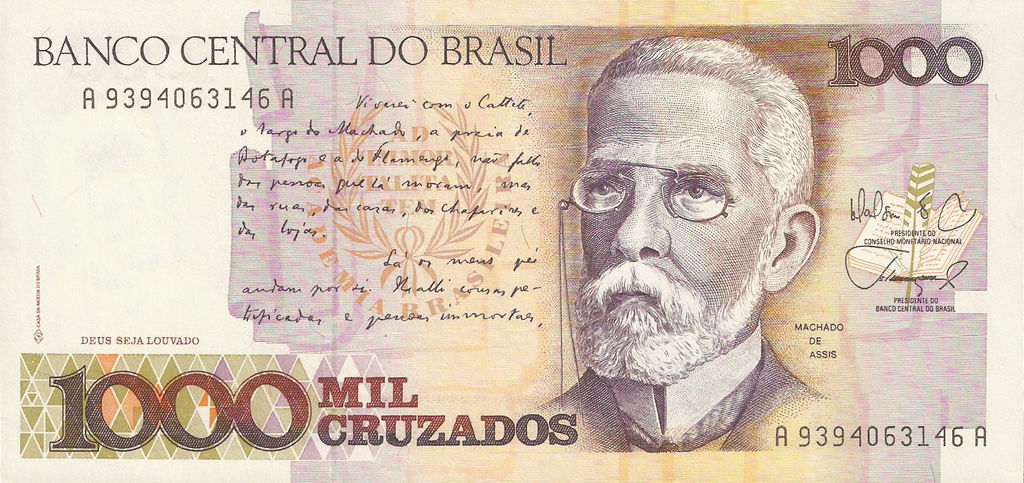
- A 1000 cruzados banknote from 1987, featuring Machado de Assis on the obverse

ISO 4217
- Code: BRC

Units of account
- Base unit: cruzado
- Plural: cruzados
- Symbol: Cz$
- Subunit
- 1/100: centavo
- Plural
- centavo: centavos

Denominations
- Banknotes: Cz$10, Cz$50, Cz$100, Cz$500, Cz$1000, Cz$5000, Cz$10 000
- Coins: 1, 5, 10, 20, 50 centavos, Cz$1, Cz$5, Cz$10

Demographics
- Date of introduction: 28 February 1986
- Replaced: Cruzeiro (2nd iteration; BRB)
- Date of withdrawal: 15 January 1989
- Replaced by: Cruzado novo (BRN)
- User(s): Brazil

Issuance
- Central bank: Central Bank of Brazil
- Website: www.bcb.gov.br
- Printer: Casa da Moeda do Brasil
- Website: www.casadamoeda.gov.br
- Mint: Casa da Moeda do Brasil
- Website: www.casadamoeda.gov.br

Valuation
- Inflation: 3.8%
- This infobox shows the latest status before this currency was rendered obsolete.

The cruzado was the currency of Brazil from 1986 to 1989. It replaced the second cruzeiro (at first called the "cruzeiro novo") in 1986, at a rate of 1 cruzado = 1000 cruzeiros (novos) and was replaced in 1989 by the cruzado novo at a rate of 1000 cruzados = 1 cruzado novo.

This currency was subdivided in 100 centavos and it had the symbol $\mathrm{CzS}\!\!\!\Vert$ and the ISO 4217 code BRC.

== Coins ==
=== Standard ===
Stainless-steel coins were introduced in 1986 in denominations of 1, 5, 10, 20 and 50 centavos, and 1 and 5 cruzados, with 10 cruzados following in 1987. Coin production ceased in 1988.

Coins of the Cruzado
Reverse	Obverse	Value
		Cz$0.01
		Cz$0.05
		Cz$0.10
		Cz$0.20
		Cz$0.50
		Cz$1
		Cz$5
		Cz$10

=== Commemorative ===
Three designs of commemorative 100 cruzado coins, celebrating the 100th anniversary of the abolition of slavery in the country (the Lei Áurea), were produced in 1988. Although very rare in circulation, the numbers' design was carried over into both Cruzado Novo and the third Cruzeiro.

Commemorative coins of the Cruzado
Reverse	Obverse	Value	Details
		Cz$100	Design portraying either a child, a man, or a woman, with the word "Axé" and the words "Centenário da Abolição" ("100th anniversary of the abolition"). The years 1888 and 1988 are also inscribed.

== Banknotes ==
The first banknotes were overprints on cruzeiro notes, in denominations of 10, 50 and 100 cruzados. Regular notes followed in denominations of 10, 50, 100 and 500 cruzados, followed by 1000 cruzados in 1987, 5000 and 10,000 cruzados in 1988.

Banknotes of the cruzado
Denomination	Obverse	Reverse
Cz$10		
Cz$50		
Cz$100		
Cz$500		
Cz$1000		
Cz$5000		
Cz$10000		

Brazilian cruzado (BRC)
Preceded by: Cruzeiro (BRB); Reason: inflation Ratio: Cr$1,000 = Cz$1	Currency of Brazil; 28 February 1986 – 15 January 1989	Succeeded by: Cruzado novo (BRN); Reason: inflation Ratio: Cz$1,000 = NCz$1
