= Centavo =

Fractional monetary unit, 1/100

The centavo (Spanish and Portuguese 'one hundredth') is a fractional monetary unit that represents one hundredth of a basic monetary unit in many countries around the world. The term comes from Latin centum (lit. 'one hundred'), with the added suffix -avo ('portion').

Coins of various denominations of centavos have been made from copper, stainless steel, aluminum-bronze, and silver.

== Circulating ==
Places that currently use the centavo include:

- Argentine peso
- Bolivian boliviano
- Brazilian real
- Cape Verdean escudo
- Colombian peso
- Cuban peso
- Dominican peso
- East Timorese centavo coins
- Ecuadorian centavo coins
- Guatemalan quetzal
- Honduran lempira
- Macanese avos
- Mexican peso
- Mozambican metical
- Nicaraguan córdoba
- Philippine peso (In English usage; sentimo or céntimo is used in Tagalog and Spanish respectively.)
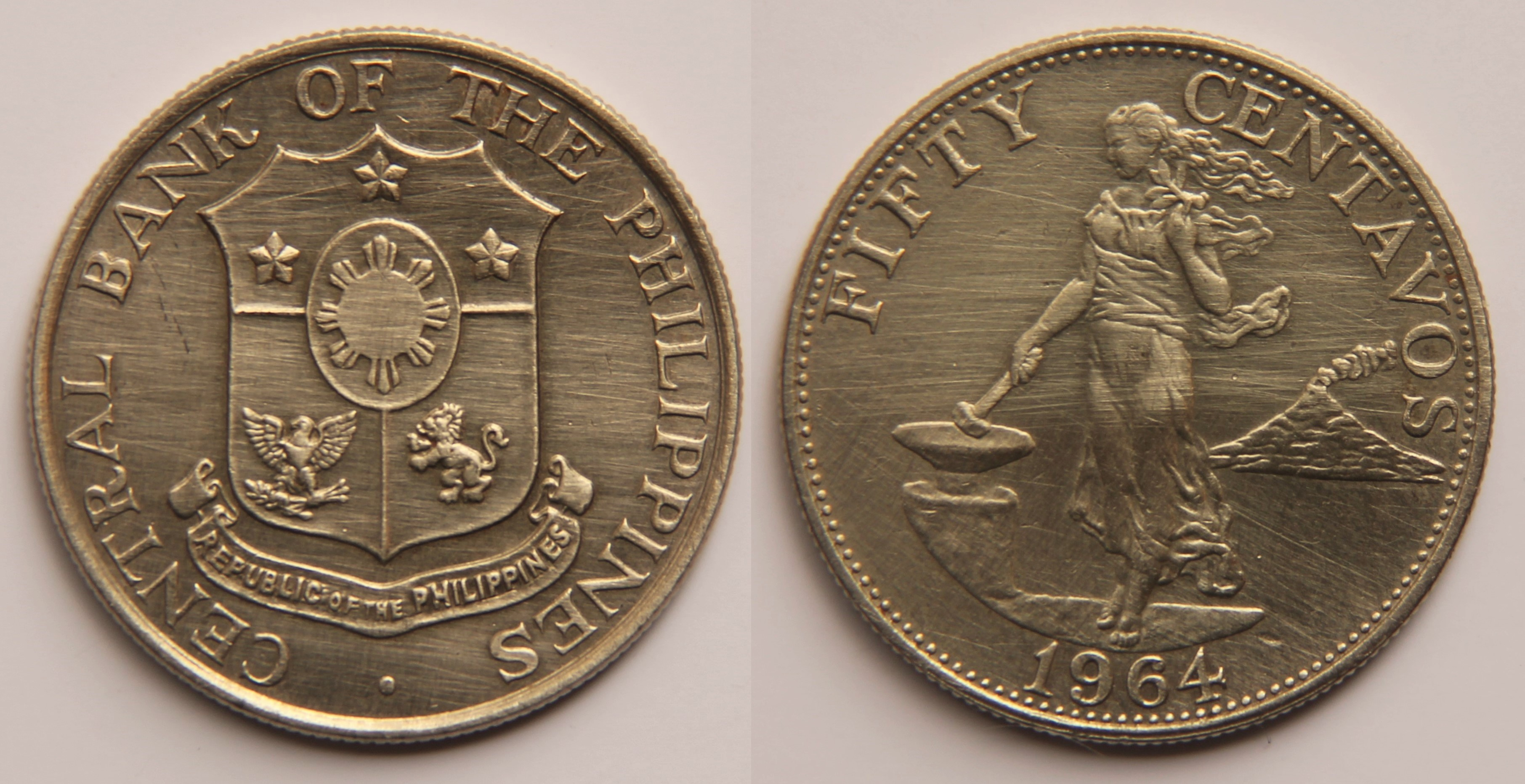
50 Philippine centavos (1964) of the English series.

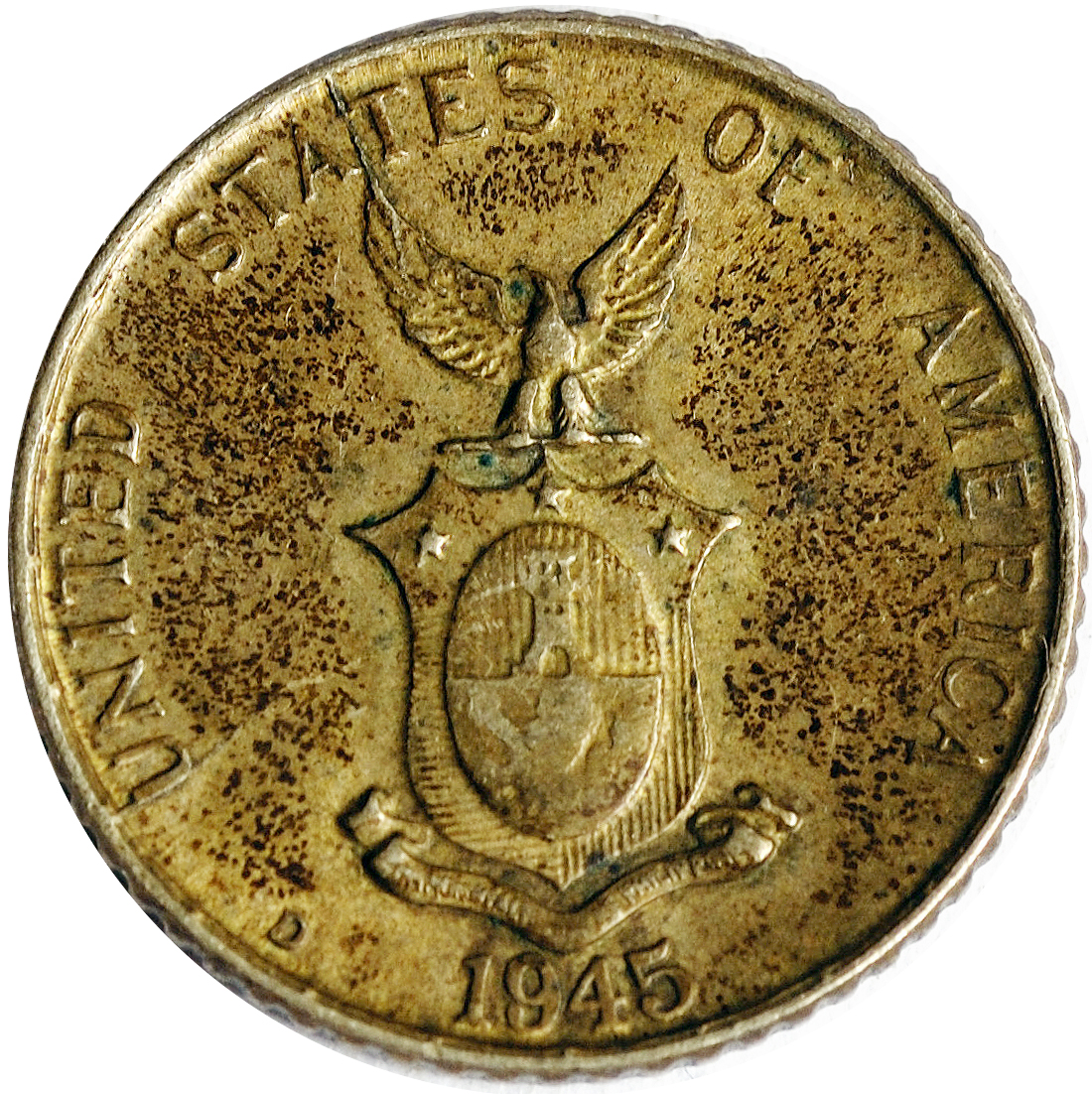
10 Philippine centavos (1945), from the Commonwealth period.

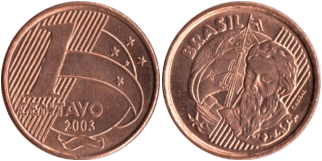
1 Brazilian centavo (2003), no longer produced.

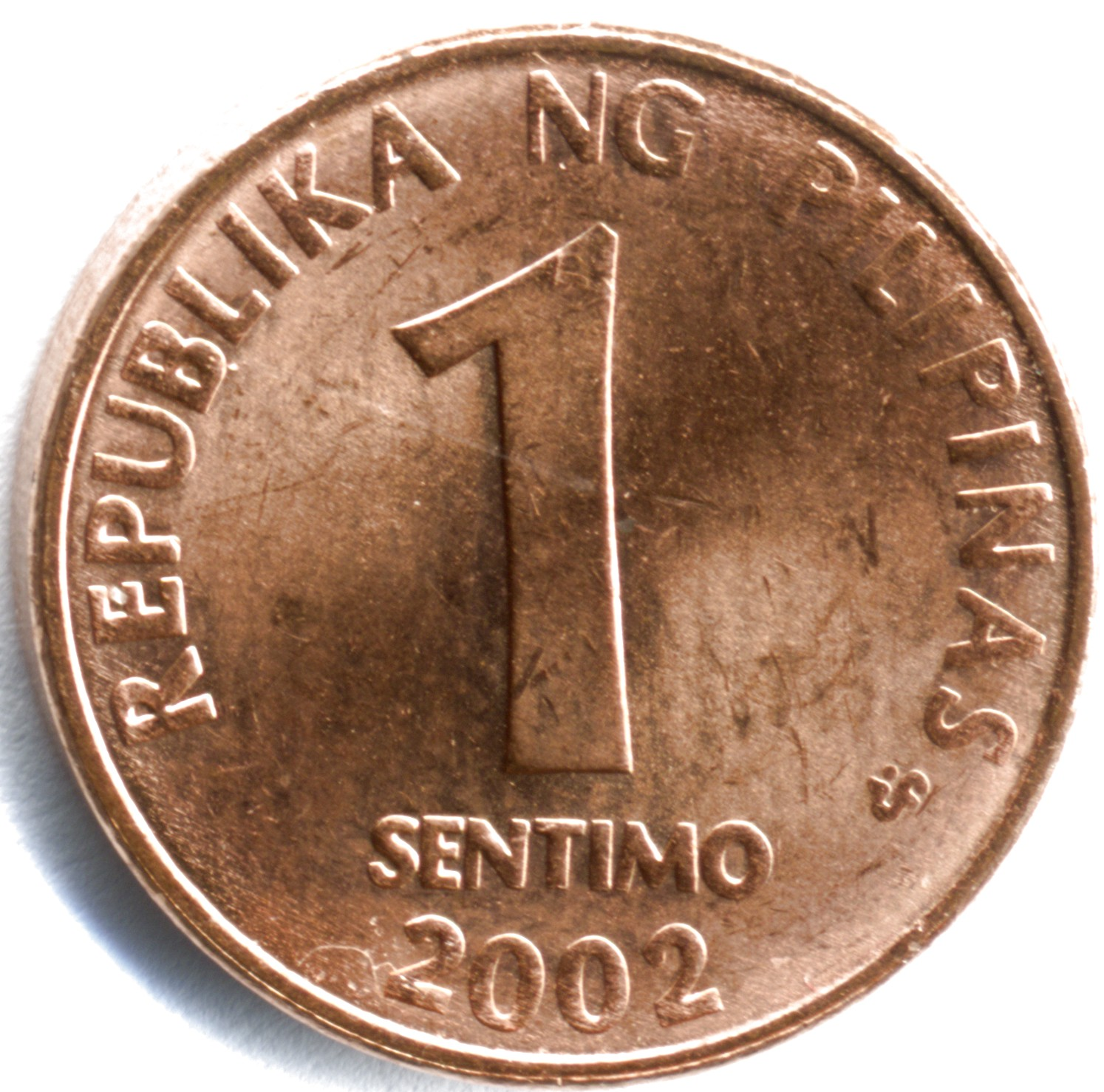
1 sentimo coin (2002), from the BSP series

== Obsolete ==
Former forms of the centavo that are no longer in use include:

- Brazilian cruzeiro (from 1942 to 1986 and from 1990 to 1993)
- Brazilian cruzado (from 1986 to 1989)
- Brazilian cruzado novo (from 1989 to 1990)
- Costa Rican colón (Between 1917 and 1920 only. As céntimo for other periods.)
- Ecuadorian sucre (New centavo coins continued to circulate after the sucre was replaced by U.S. dollar in 2000.)
- Salvadoran colón
- Guinea Bissau peso
- Mozambican escudo
- Portuguese escudo (before the euro was introduced)
- Portuguese Guinean escudo
- Portuguese Indian escudo
- Puerto Rican peso
- São Tomé and Príncipe escudo
- Venezuelan venezolano
- Venezuelan peso
- Chilean Cent (from 1975 to 1983, as a subdivision of the Chilean peso; out of circulation due to inflation)

== See also ==
- Cent (currency)
- Coin
- Céntimo
