= Thomas de la Rue =

British printer 1793 – 1866

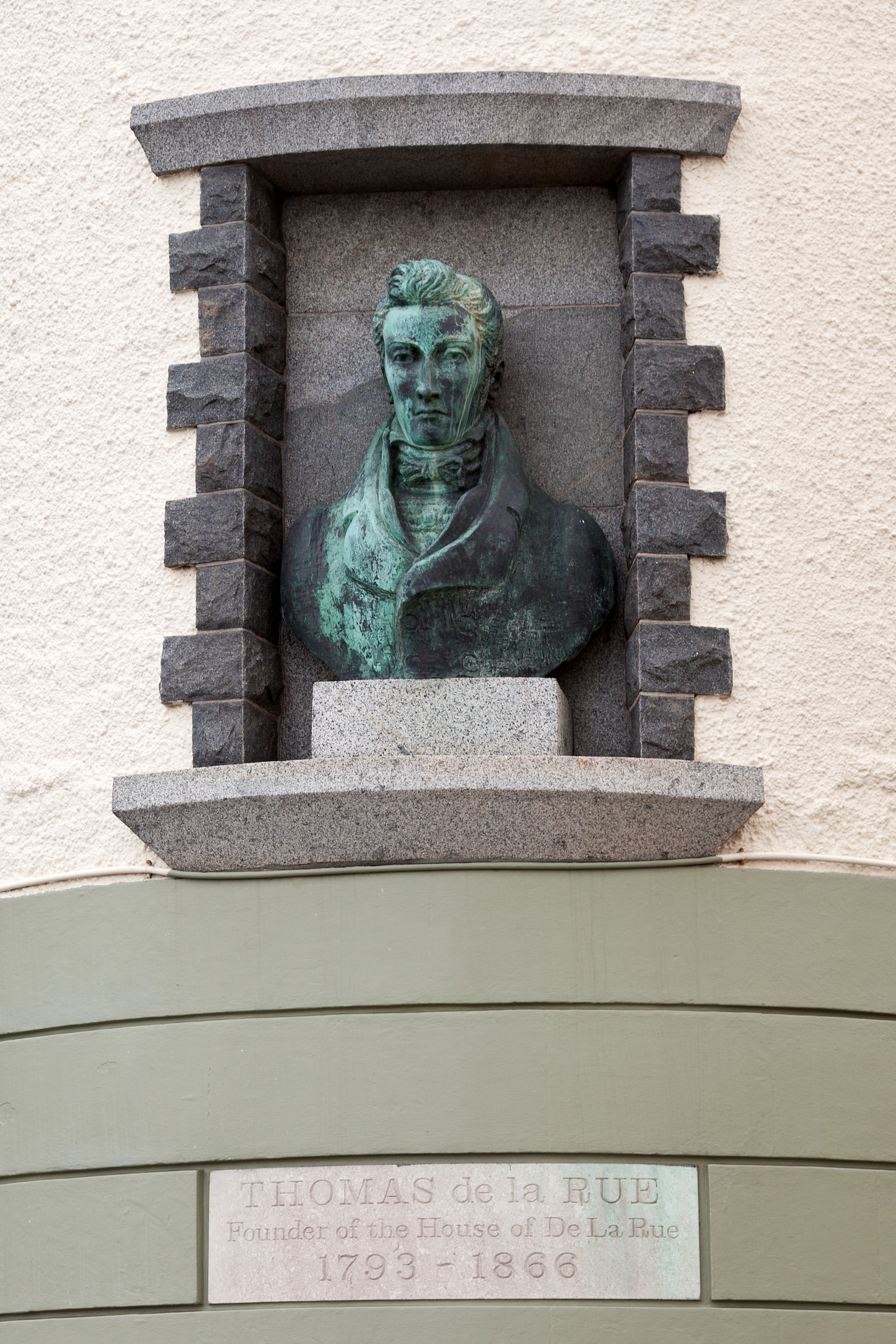
- Born: 24 March 1793; Le Bourg, Forest, Guernsey
- Died: 7 June 1866 (aged 73); Kensington, Middlesex, England, United Kingdom
- Occupation: Printer
- Spouse: Jane Warren (m. 1816; died 1858)
- Children: 8 including Warren

Thomas de la Rue (24 March 1793 – 7 June 1866) was a printer from Guernsey who founded De La Rue plc, a printing company which is now the world's largest commercial security printer and papermaker.

== Biography ==
Born on Le Bourg, Forest, Guernsey to Rachel Allez and Eleazar de la Rue. Thomas was the seventh of their nine children. Thomas de la Rue was apprenticed to a master-printer, Joseph Antoine Chevalier in Saint Peter Port in 1803.

He went into business with Tom Greenslade and together they launched the newspaper Le Publiciste. Having fallen out with Greenslade, Thomas de la Rue launched his own publication, Le Miroir politique, first published on 6 February 1813.

In 1816 he left Guernsey, for London, where he initially established a business making straw hats. Then in 1830 together with Samuel Cornish and William Rock he founded a business of "cardmakers, hot pressers and enamellers". in 1831, de la Rue was granted the right to print playing cards, making it the first company to do so; it printed its first pack the following year. Soon afterwards, Thomas hired Owen Jones, a well-known designer and architect. By 1837 his wife, his two sons William Frederick and Warren De la Rue and his eldest daughter were involved in the business. In 1855 Thomas was made a Chevalier (Knight) of the Legion of Honour. In 1858, he retired from De La Rue, handing over the management of the business to his sons.

Thomas de la Rue died in Kensington in 1866.

== Family ==
He married Jane Warren (17 June 1789 – 22 September 1858) on 21 March 1816. He had six daughters and two sons: Mary, Elizabeth, Georgiana, Louisa, Jane, Warren and William.

== Memorials ==
The Guernsey Post Office has issued two sets of postage stamps commemorating his life and achievements, in 1971 and 1993.

There is a pub on The Pollet, Saint Peter Port, Guernsey, named after him.

In 1991 the States of Guernsey issued a £5 banknote with Thomas De La Rue on the reverse. A commemorative one-pound note was issued in July 2013, to mark 200 years since the first commercial venture of Thomas De La Rue. The note is in circulation alongside the standard one-pound note.
