= Casa da Moeda do Brasil =

Mint of Brazil

Coordinates: 22°53′21″S 43°44′44″W

National Mint of Brazil
- Casa da Moeda do Brasil

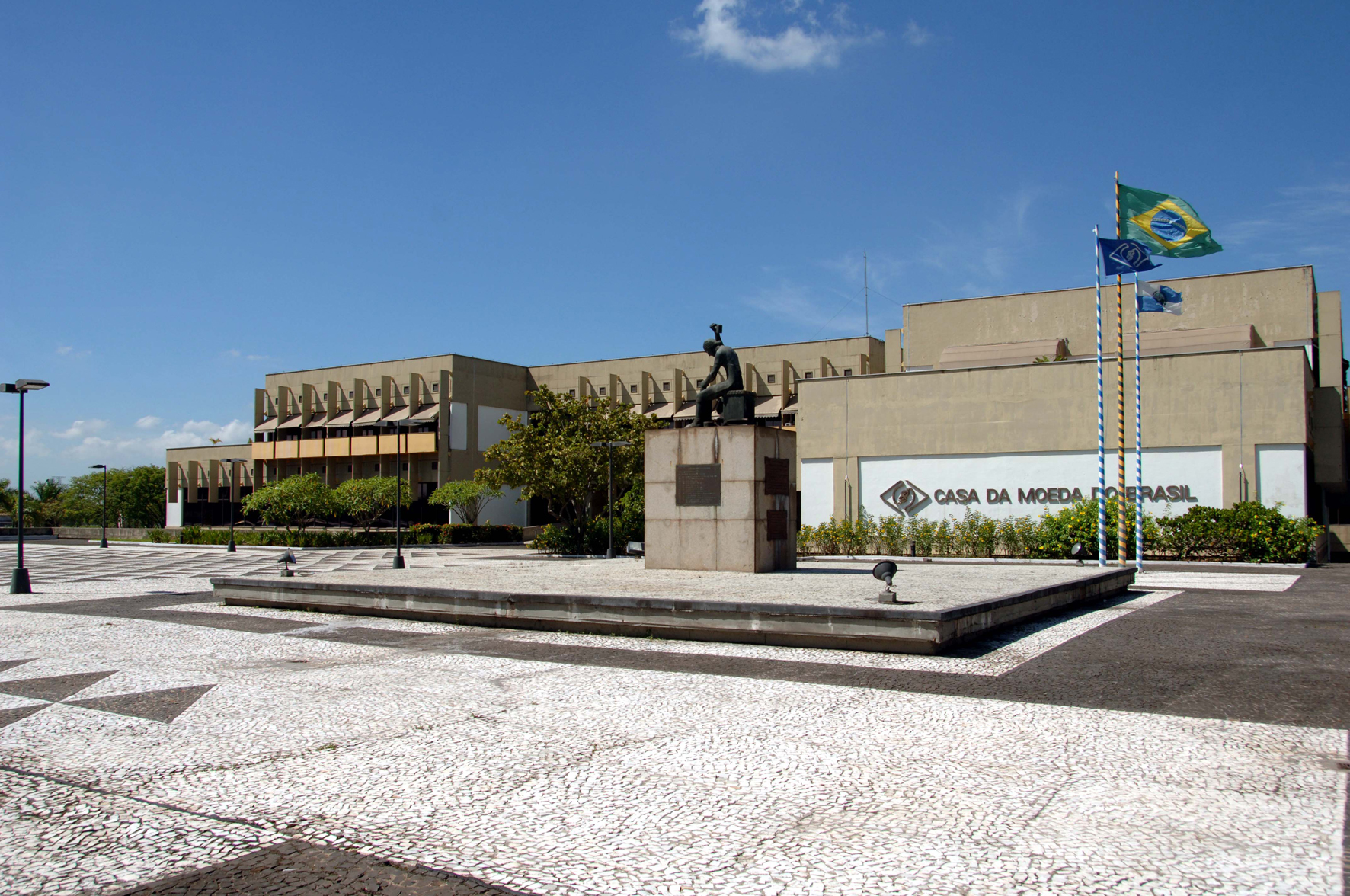

Agency overview
- Formed: 8 March 1694; 332 years ago by D. Pedro II of Portugal
- Headquarters: Rua René Bittencourt, 371, Rio de Janeiro, Brazil
- Agency executive: Alexandre Borges Cabral, President
- Website: www.casadamoeda.gov.br

The Casa da Moeda do Brasil is the Brazilian mint, owned by the Brazilian government and administratively subordinated to the Ministry of Finances. It was established in 1694. Its current headquarters and industrial facilities occupy a modern plant with 110,000 square metres (1.2 million square feet) in Rio de Janeiro's western suburb of Santa Cruz.

It produces legal tender coins and banknotes. It also produces medals and security prints (i.e., passports, subway tokens, postage stamps) that are used and issued by government-run service providers. Having the highest technology and production capacity in South America, until the 1980s it also produced coins, banknotes and passports for several South American and African countries that lacked a similar facility. It is now aiming to return to the foreign market.

== See also ==
- Brazilian passport
- Brazilian real
