= Avram (given name) =

Masculine given name

Avram is a male given name. It is the Hebrew form of the name Abram, which means exalted father. Its origin ties back to Abraham, the founding patriarch of the Israelites, Ishmaelites, Midianites, and Edomite peoples.

The following people share this name:

- Avram Alpert, American academic
- Avram Barokas (1926–2003), Turkish basketball player
- Avram Branković (1799–1831), Serbian-Hungarian translator
- Avram Bunaciu (1909–1983), Romanian communist politician
- Avram Cemović (1864–1914), Serbian commander
- Avram Noam Chomsky (born 1928), American linguist and political activist
- Avram Davidson (1923–1993), American writer
- Avram Fefer, American jazz Musician
- Avram Finkelstein, American artist
- Avram C. Freedberg (born 1947), American producer
- Avram Glazer (born 1960), American businessperson
- Avram Goldstein (1919–2012), American pharmacologist who helped discover endorphins
- Avram Grant (born 1955), Israeli association football manager
- Avram Hershko (born 1937), Israeli Nobel laureate biochemist
- Avram Iancu (1824–1872), Romanian lawyer
- Avram Imbroane (1880–1938), Romanian politician, businessman, and priest
- Avram Miletić (1755–after 1826), Serbian composer
- Avram Miller (born 1945), American businessman
- Avram Mlotek (born 1987), American social activist and organizer
- Avram Mrazović (1756–1826), Serbian writer
- Avram Patt, Vermont politician
- Avram Petronijević (1791–1852), Serbian politician
- Avram Ratkov (1773–1829), Russian general
- Avram Razgon (1920–1989), Russian historian and professor
- Avram Steuerman-Rodion (1872–1918), Romanian writer
- Avram Zeleznikow (1924–2013), Holocaust survivor
