= Avramović =

Avramović (Serbian: Аврамовић) is a Serbian surname derived from a masculine given name Avram, and may refer to:

- Aleksa Avramović, (born 1994), Serbian basketball player
- Aleksandra Avramović (born 1982), Serbian volleyball player
- Dimitrije Avramović (1815–1855), Serbian painter
- Dragoljub Avramović (born 1979), Serbian basketball coach
- Dragoslav Avramović (1919–2001), Serbian economist
- Ivica Avramović (born 1976), Serbian footballer
- Marko Avramović (born 1986), Serbian water polo player
- Marko Avramović (born 1987), Serbian footballer
- Miguel Avramovic (born 1981), Argentine rugby union footballer
- Radojko Avramović (born 1949), football coach
- Saša Avramović (born 1993), Serbian basketball player
- Sima Avramović (born 1950), Serbian legal academic
- Miloš Avramović (born 1993), Serbian accordion artist
- Aleksandar Avramović (born 1961), Serbian architect
- Mina Avramović (born 1990), Serbian architect

As a patronym: Avramovich is a patronym for the Hebrew name Avram.
