= Freedom Tower Silver Dollar =

Privately minted commemorative coin

- Value: No official value (Face value 1.00) USD
- Mass: 26.68 g (0.858 troy oz) (0.94 oz)
- Diameter: 39 mm (1.54 in)
- Thickness: 2.8 mm (0.11 in)
- Edge: reeded
- Composition: Bronze base (reported), 0.0001 in (2.5 μm) silver clad

Obverse
- Design: Freedom Tower with the New York City skyline
- Designer: Daniel Carr ("DC" inscription)
- Design date: 2004

Reverse
- Design: Twin Towers of the World Trade Center with the New York City skyline
- Designer: Daniel Carr ("DC" inscription)
- Design date: 2004

The Freedom Tower Silver Dollar is a "one dollar" coin minted under license of the Commonwealth of the Northern Mariana Islands (CNMI) in 2004, although the CNMI does not have legal authority to issue or authorize currency. Despite vague statements in advertisements, it is not issued by the United States Mint and is not considered legal tender, nor is it considered non-circulating legal tender. The CNMI receives royalty fees from proceeds of the sale of the coin. The coin itself was actually minted by SoftSky, a Wyoming commemorative coin maker.

== Description ==
The obverse of the coin features a rendered image of the original design proposal for the Freedom Tower by Daniel Libeskind that was to be built on the former site of the World Trade Center in New York City. Also on the obverse are the United States national motto "In God We Trust" and the words "Freedom Tower, July 4, 2004." The reverse features an image of the former World Trade Center and the words "We Will Never Forget", along with a small symbol of a star on a stone pillar within a circle. This latter unidentified icon is in fact the coat of arms of the Northern Mariana Islands.

== Legality ==
The distributor of the coin, National Collector's Mint, advertises the item as "legally authorized government issue" and marks the coin with the valuation of "One Dollar". This is seen as being a deliberate attempt to mislead American consumers into believing it is a legal tender coin produced by the United States Mint and is worth one U.S. dollar. In reaction to advertising for this product, the U.S. Mint, as well as the attorneys general of various U.S. states, released a statement that the coin is not U.S. government issue. Furthermore, since the Northern Mariana Islands is a United States Commonwealth, it cannot mint its own legal tender currency (it uses regular American money).

The distributors also purport that the coins have been struck using silver recovered from a vault in the rubble of the World Trade Center. The validity of this claim has not been confirmed. Distributors warn that the minting of the coin will cease once the quantity of recovered silver has been exhausted, and have therefore placed a limit on the number of coins that can be ordered per person. The coins are not solid silver, but are silver clad (0.0001 inch (2.5 micrometre) layer). Actual silver content is 45 mg, or 0.00145 troy oz.

The territorial government of the CNMI has made money from commissioning commemorative, non-tender coins through SoftSky and National Collector's Mint in the past, but does not claim the right to commission legal tender coinage. Some past coins issued by SoftSky, such as the 1933 Gold Double Eagle coin, have also incurred marketing controversy.

In October 2004 the attorney general of New York, Eliot Spitzer, obtained a court order against National Collectors Mint (a Port Chester, New York company) to halt sales of the "Freedom Tower Silver Dollar" coin, citing it as fraudulently advertised. Spitzer also alleged that the company's sales contacts had asserted that the coin is legal tender. On October 13, 2004, Spitzer obtained a temporary order halting the company from advertising or selling the coin. On November 9, State Supreme Court Justice Joseph R. Cannizzaro ruled that the company had engaged in deceptive and fraudulent marketing practices, and ordered the company to terminate its misleading advertising of the coin.

An investigation as to the silver content and the origin of the silver in the coins was started. The attorney general's office easily determined that the coin was only silver clad, but as of 2005 the veracity of the claim that this silver came from a World Trade Center bank vault had not been determined.

As a result of the controversy and legal action over the Freedom Tower coin, CNMI governor Juan N. Babauta suspended the SoftSky contract on November 13, 2004. On December 2, Babauta ended the contract. Before this course of events, the CNMI government made about $160,000 off the deal.

Other groups have also released silver Freedom Tower coins, but not with a denominational value or advertised as government issue.

The CNMI coin was named "Stupid Investment of the Week" by CBS MarketWatch on September 24, 2004.

== 2005 Freedom Tower Dollar ==
In 2005, a similar coin to the CNMI Freedom Tower coin was sold, with similar design and the same claim of being made from silver "reclaimed" from the World Trade Center, but bearing the name of the Cook Islands instead of the CNMI. The Cook Islands are a self-governing democracy, and do mint their own currency (at par with the New Zealand dollar), though this coin is sold as a "non-circulating legal tender" coin. As of February 19, 2014 this Company still has a catalog selling "World Trade Center 'Recovery Silver' Silver Eagle Dollars" for $99.00 with a claim that all silver has been independently verified as authentic from Ground Zero by a former Asst. Director of the FBI.

== 2001–2006 World Trade Center Gold and Silver Clad Commemorative ==
As of 2006, the National Collectors Mint was offering what is variously described as 2001–2006 World Trade Center Gold and Silver Clad Commemorative, 2001–2006 World Trade Center Commemorative, and 5th Anniversary World Trade Center Commemorative. It is advertised as a "non-monetary issue" that "will never be released for circulation."

This coin is a two-piece set of a gold coin with a detachable silver inset of the World Trade Center complex and claims to contain "15 mg. of 24 KT gold and 15 mg. of .999 Pure silver clad," and also continued to claim that the silver was found in a bank vault buried under the rubble of Ground Zero. For comparison, a U.S. dollar coin is 8.1 g and a dime is 2.268 g, meaning that the precious metal content of the commemorative coin is likely between 0.4% and 1.3% of the total mass.

It was discovered that the silver analyzed was, indeed, not silver, and was only worth about 32 cents.

The company claims that "$5 of every 2001–2006 World Trade Center Commemorative order is donated to official 9/11 family charities and memorials." This claim has not been verified.
