= National Collector's Mint =

Private mint

National Collector's Mint, Inc.
- Type: Private Company
- Industry: Collectibles coins, tokens, commemoratives
- Founded: 1991
- Headquarters: Westchester County, New York
- Key people: Avram C. Freedberg (Founder; Chairman); Barry Goldwater Jr. (Director; Spokesperson); Angela Marie Buchanan (Co-Director)
- Products: Non-circulating legal tender coins, tokens, replicas, commemorative, collectibles
- Number of employees: 24
- Website: www.nationalcollectorsmint.com

National Collector's Mint, Inc. is a Westchester County, New York based company that sells privately produced coins, tokens, commemoratives, and collectibles. The company does not produce coins that are legal tender in the United States and they are not affiliated, endorsed, or licensed by the U.S. government or the United States Mint. However, the company does also act as a retailer, reselling government proof coins and other legal tender. The mint also creates non-currency coins for large corporations.

== 9/11 coinage incident ==
The company's repeated attempts to profit from the 9/11 attacks led Senator Charles Schumer to refer to the company as a "despicable scam." The company was penalized for fraud in 2004, when State Supreme Court Justice Thomas J. McNamara fined the National Collector's Mint for engaging in false advertising and deceptive business practices when issuing their Freedom Tower Silver Dollar coins.

Sales of the Freedom Tower Silver Dollar coins were halted by a court order in October 2004 at the request of then New York Attorney General Eliot Spitzer. The company received approval from the officials of the Commonwealth of the Northern Mariana Islands to produce legal tender coinage on their behalf, but Spitzer noted the Commonwealth is not authorized to issue its own currency. It was also indicated that the exact amount of silver contained in the commemorative was not clear to customers. A judge ruled in 2004 the company was guilty of fraud, false advertising and deceptive business. Subsequent ads for the new Freedom Tower coins indicated the actual silver weight (45 mg, or 0.00145 troy oz.) rather than the thickness of silver in mils used.

Senator Charles Schumer and Representative Jerrold Nadler said the claim the silver was recovered from the vaults beneath the World Trade Center ruins cannot be substantiated and called on the Federal Trade Commission to stop National Collector's Mint from selling the Sept. 11 coins, which are seen as taking sales away from an official Sept. 11 medal that benefits the National September 11 Memorial & Museum being built at the World Trade Center site.

In contrast to the NCM's unsubstantiated claims, a sizeable number of coins that can be traced back to the WTC vaults exist; unlike the NCM's offerings, these coins were certified and graded by PCGS, and profits from their sales were donated to recovery funds.

In 2013, the company settled out of court and agreed to pay a $750,000 fine to the FTC for misrepresenting the authenticity of their 9/11 products.

== See also ==
- Danbury Mint
- Franklin Mint
- Littleton Coin Company
