= Avram Branković =

Hungarian-Serbian translator

Avram Branković or Abraham Brankovits (Serbian Cyrillic: Аврам Бранковић; 1799 – July 1831) was a Hungarian official in Buda of Serbian descent. He is best remembered as an excellent translator from German to Serbian.

== His life ==
Born in Vranjevo-Novi Bečej, he was the son of Antonije Branković. He studied law in Karlovica and Szeged and received his degree in Jurisprudence from the Grande école in Pest, then he went on to perfect his Hungarian in Kežmarok and German in Vienna. In 1830 he went to the Serbia and sought employment as a district clerk at the newly-established printing press where he met many literary figures, including Vuk Karadžić, Marija Milutinovic Punktatorka, Julijana Radivojevic, Georgije Magarašević and others.

Avram Branković is best known for one of the oldest books that deals with the problems of ethnologic characteristics in Serbia -- "Characteristic or nation description" -- which was published in 1827 in Buda, only two years after Noveise zemleopisanie by Joakim Vujić was also published in Buda.

He died in Brusnica.

== His works ==
- Charakteristik aller Nationen or "Characteristics or nation description", Buda, 1827
- Pregled i lětočisleno označenie u carstvu istorie svemirne: od početka sveta do danas, Buda, 1828
- Boj kod Novarina, Buda, 1829 (The Battle of Navarre, translated from German:Die Schlacht von Navarin)
- Novi zabavni kalendar, Buda, 1830 (New Serbian entertainment calendar.

== Sources ==
- József Szinnyei: The Life and Works of Hungarian Writers I. (Aachs – Bzenszki). Budapest: Hornyánszky. 1891. (Abraham Biankovič)
- József Szinnyei: The Life and Works of Hungarian Writers I. (Aachs – Bzenszki). Budapest: Hornyánszky. 1891 (Abraham Brankovits)
- This is the case in Novi Bečej i Novobečejce

== Additional notes ==
- Pál Gulyás: The Life and Works of Hungarian Writers. Bp., Association of Hungarian Librarians and Archivists, 1939-2002. From volume 7 to press order. János Viczián.
- Das geistige Ungarn, Biographisches Lexikon. Hrsg. Oscar von Krücken, Imre Parlagi. Wien-Leipzig, W. Braumüller, 1918.
- Pallas the great lexicon, an encyclopedia of all knowledge. 1-16 k. (17-18 deputies. Edited by József Bokor). Bp., Pallas-Révai, 1893-1904.
