= Brazilian real =

Currency of Brazil

Real brasileiro (Portuguese)
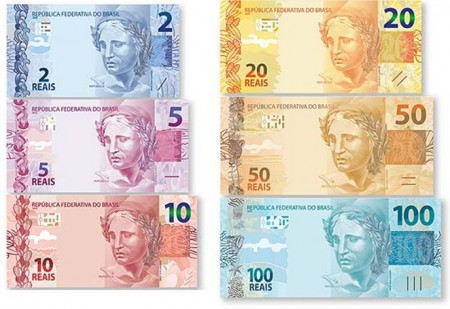
Banknotes of reais (from 2 reais to 100 reais)
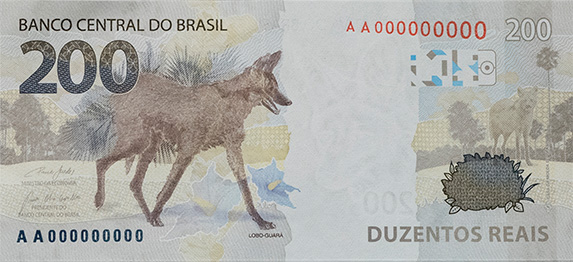
200 reais banknote

ISO 4217
- Code: BRL (numeric: 986)
- Subunit: 0.01

Units of account
- Base unit: real
- Plural: reais
- Symbol: R$
- Nickname: pila, prata, mango, pau, conto
- Subunit
- 1/100: centavo
- Plural
- centavo: centavos

Denominations
- Banknotes: R$2, R$5, R$10, R$20, R$50, R$100, R$200
- Coins: 5, 10, 25, 50 centavos, R$1

Demographics
- Date of introduction: 1 July 1994
- Replaced: Cruzeiro real (BRR)
- User(s): Brazil

Issuance
- Central bank: Central Bank of Brazil
- Website: www.bcb.gov.br
- Printer: Casa da Moeda do Brasil
- Website: www.casadamoeda.gov.br
- Mint: Casa da Moeda do Brasil
- Website: www.casadamoeda.gov.br

Valuation
- Inflation: 4.26% (27 December 2025)
- Source: Instituto Brasileiro de Geografia e Estatística (IBGE)
- Method: Consumer price index (CPI)

The real (Note: Brazilian Portuguese pronunciation: [ʁeˈaw], plural: reais) (sign: R$; code: BRL) is the official currency of Brazil. It is subdivided into 100 centavos. The Central Bank of Brazil is the central bank and the issuing authority. The real replaced the cruzeiro real in 1994.

As of April 2019, the real was the twentieth most traded currency.

== History ==
Currencies in use before the current real include:

- The Portuguese real from the 16th to 18th centuries, with 1,000 réis called the milréis.
- The old Brazilian real from 1747 to 1942, with 1,000 réis also called the milréis.
- The first cruzeiro from 1942 to 1967, at 1 cruzeiro = 1 milréis or 1,000 réis.
- The cruzeiro novo from 1967 to 1970, at 1 cruzeiro novo = 1,000 first cruzeiros. From 1970 it was simply called the (second) cruzeiro and was used until 1986.
- The cruzado from 1986 to 1989, at 1 cruzado = 1,000 second cruzeiros.
- The cruzado novo from 1989 to 1990, at 1 cruzado novo = 1,000 cruzados. From 1990, because of the Plano Collor it was renamed the (third) cruzeiro and was used until 1993.
- The cruzeiro real (CR$) from 1993 to 1994, at 1 cruzeiro real = 1,000 third cruzeiros.

The current real was introduced in 1994 at 1 real = 2,750 cruzeiros reais.

The modern real (Portuguese plural reais or English plural reals) was introduced on 1 July 1994, during the presidency of Itamar Franco, when Rubens Ricupero was the Minister of Finance as part of a broader plan to stabilize the Brazilian economy, known as the Plano Real. The new currency replaced the short-lived cruzeiro real (CR$). The reform included the demonetisation of the cruzeiro real and required a massive banknote replacement.

At its introduction, the real was defined to be equal to 1 unidade real de valor (URV, "real value unit") a non-circulating currency unit. At the same time, the URV was defined to be worth 2,750 cruzeiros reais, which was the average exchange rate of the U.S. dollar to the cruzeiro real on that day. As a consequence, the real was worth exactly one U.S. dollar when it was introduced; as of June 2024, that was equivalent to R$8.08 corrected for inflation. Combined with all previous currency changes in the country's history, this reform made the new real equal to 2.75×10^{18} (2.75 quintillion) of Brazil's original réis.

Soon after its introduction, the real unexpectedly gained value against the U.S. dollar, due to large capital inflows in late 1994 and 1995. During that period it attained its maximum dollar value ever, about US$1.20 = R$1. Between 1996 and 1998 the exchange rate was tightly controlled by the Central Bank of Brazil, so that the real depreciated slowly and smoothly to the dollar, dropping from near US$1 = R$1 to about US$1 = R$1.20 by the end of 1998. In January 1999 the deterioration of the international markets, disrupted by the Russian default, forced the Central Bank, under its new president Arminio Fraga, to float the exchange rate. This decision produced a major devaluation, to a rate of almost US$1 = R$2.

In the following years, the currency's value against the dollar followed an erratic but mostly downward path from 1999 until late 2002, when the prospect of the election of leftist candidate Luiz Inácio Lula da Silva, considered a radical populist by sectors of the financial markets, prompted another currency crisis and a spike in inflation. Many Brazilians feared another default on government debts or a resumption of heterodox economic policies and rushed to exchange their reais into tangible assets or foreign currencies.

The crisis subsided once Lula took office, after he, his finance minister Antonio Palocci, and Arminio Fraga reaffirmed their intention to continue the orthodox macroeconomic policies of his predecessor (including inflation-targeting, primary fiscal surplus and floating exchange rate, as well as continued payments of the public debt). The value of the real in dollars continued to fluctuate but generally upwards, so that by 2005 the exchange was a little over US$1 = R$2. In May 2007, for the first time since 2001 (six years), the real became worth more than US$0.50 — even though the Central Bank, concerned about its effect on the Brazilian economy, had tried to keep it below that symbolic threshold. Lula started his government on 1 January 2003 with an exchange rate of US$1=R$3.52 and finished it on 31 December 2010 with an exchange rate of US$1 = R$1.66.

The exchange rate as of September 2015 was US$1 = R$4.05. After a period of gradual recovery, it reached US$1 = R$3 by February 2017.

Jair Bolsonaro's tenure, initially welcomed with enthusiasm by the financial markets, started with US$1 = R$3.86. Fueled by meager results of the economy, quick disenchantment followed, resulting in a lack of foreign investments and a real's strong depreciation. On 13 May 2020, during the COVID-19 pandemic, which deeply affected Brazil, the real reached a historical low against the US dollar, being negotiated at US$1 = R$5.90.

Following Lula's reelection in the 2022 general elections, the market, which was expected to have reacted poorly, turned out favorable in the first week. The US dollar exchange hit its lowest point since 29 August 2022, dropping from roughly US$1 = R$5.30 immediately before the second round of the election, to about US$1 = R$5.05 a week after Lula's win. However, two years into Lula's government, at 26 December 2024, the US dollar exchange hit its highest point in history of US$1 = R$6.74.

== Coins ==
=== First series (1994–1997) ===
Along with the first series of currency, coins were introduced in denominations of 1, 5, 10, and 50 centavos and 1 real on June 30, 1994. The 25 centavos piece was soon introduced on September 30, 1994 due to the constant lack of change in intermediate values in the centavos range, which caused the validity of the old cruzeiro and cruzeiro real banknotes to be extended for two months beyond what was initially intended for the exchange of banknotes and coins until then in circulation for the new ones that began to circulate in the second half of 1994. All were struck in stainless steel.

The coins issued in 1994 are identical in size and weight to the older cruzeiro real coins, save for the 1-centavo piece which corresponded to the even older 1000-cruzeiro coin, as no CR$1 coin was made. This influenced the replacement of this family with a newer one in 1998.

The original 1-real coins, produced only in 1994, were demonetized on 23 December 2003, due to frequent counterfeiting. All other coins remain legal tender.

First series
Image	Value	Design	Emission start date	Withdrawn
	1 centavo	Obverse: Large denomination flanked by linear patterns. Reverse: Head of Republic.	1 July 1994	Current
	5 centavos	Obverse: Large denomination flanked by linear patterns. Reverse: Head of Republic.	1 July 1994	Current
	10 centavos	Obverse: Large denomination flanked by linear patterns. Reverse: Head of Republic.	1 July 1994	Current
	50 centavos	Obverse: Large denomination flanked by linear patterns. Reverse: Head of Republic.	1 July 1994	Current
	1 real	Obverse: Large denomination flanked by linear patterns. Reverse: Head of Republic.	1 July 1994	23 December 2003
	25 centavos	Obverse: Large denomination intersected by wavy lines. Reverse: Head of Republic.	30 September 1994	Current

==== Commemorative coins ====
In 1995, to commemorate the 50th anniversary of the Food and Agriculture Organization, the Central Bank of Brazil released two commemorative variants of the 10 and 25 centavos coins.

Circulating commemorative coins of the Brazilian real's first series
Image	Value	Details
	10 centavos	Release date: 31 May 1995; Occasion: The 50th anniversary of the Food and Agriculture Organization (FAO); Units produced: 1 million for each design Reverse: The 10 centavos coin depicts hands offering a plant shoot with folious ramifications, and the 25 centavos coin depicts crop cultivation. Both coins contain the inscriptions "FAO—1945/1995" and "alimentos para todos" (food for all).
	25 centavos	Release date: 31 May 1995; Occasion: The 50th anniversary of the Food and Agriculture Organization (FAO); Units produced: 1 million for each design Reverse: The 10 centavos coin depicts hands offering a plant shoot with folious ramifications, and the 25 centavos coin depicts crop cultivation. Both coins contain the inscriptions "FAO—1945/1995" and "alimentos para todos" (food for all).

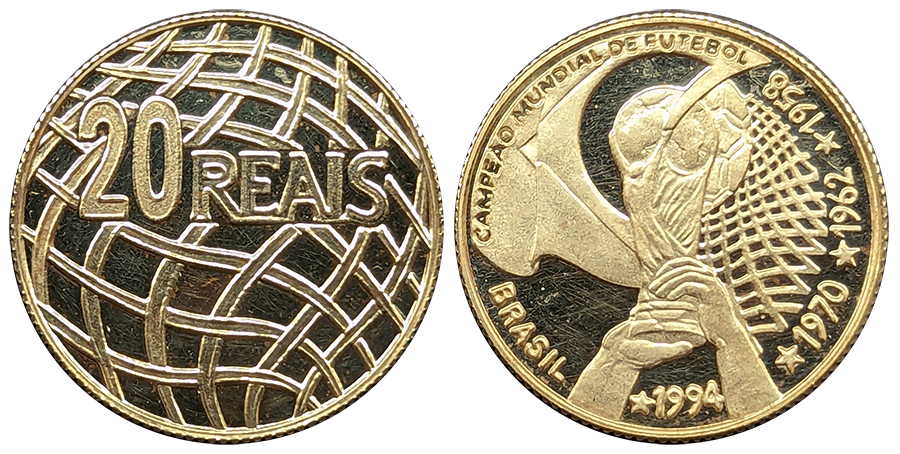
The 1995 R$20 non-circulating commemorative coin celebrating Brazil's 4th FIFA World Cup win the year prior.

Additionally, non-circulating commemorative coins have also been minted, with non-standard face values – namely R$2, R$3, R$4 and R$20 coins. Although worth more than their face value to collectors, they are nevertheless legal tender.

Non-circulating commemorative coins of the Brazilian real's first series
Value	Details
2 reais	Release date: 4 October 1994; Occasion: 300th anniversary of the Brazilian mint (1694–1994); Units produced: 7 thousand
4 reais	Release date: 23 December 1994; Occasion: Commemorating Brazil's 4th FIFA World Cup win Units produced: 9 thousand
20 reais	Release date: 10 February 1995; Occasion: Commemorating Brazil's 4th FIFA World Cup win Units produced: 2 thousand
3 reais	Release date: 31 March 1995; Occasion: 30th anniversary of the Central Bank of Brazil (1965–1995); Units produced: 5 thousand
2 reais	Release date: 4 December 1995; Occasion: Tribute to Formula One racing driver Ayrton Senna (1960–1994); Units produced: 10 thousand
20 reais	Release date: 4 December 1995; Occasion: Tribute to Formula One racing driver Ayrton Senna (1960–1994); Units produced: 5 thousand
3 reais	Release date: 24 October 1997; Occasion: 100th anniversary of the city of Belo Horizonte, capital of the state of Minas Gerais; Units produced: 20 thousand

=== Second series (1998–present) ===
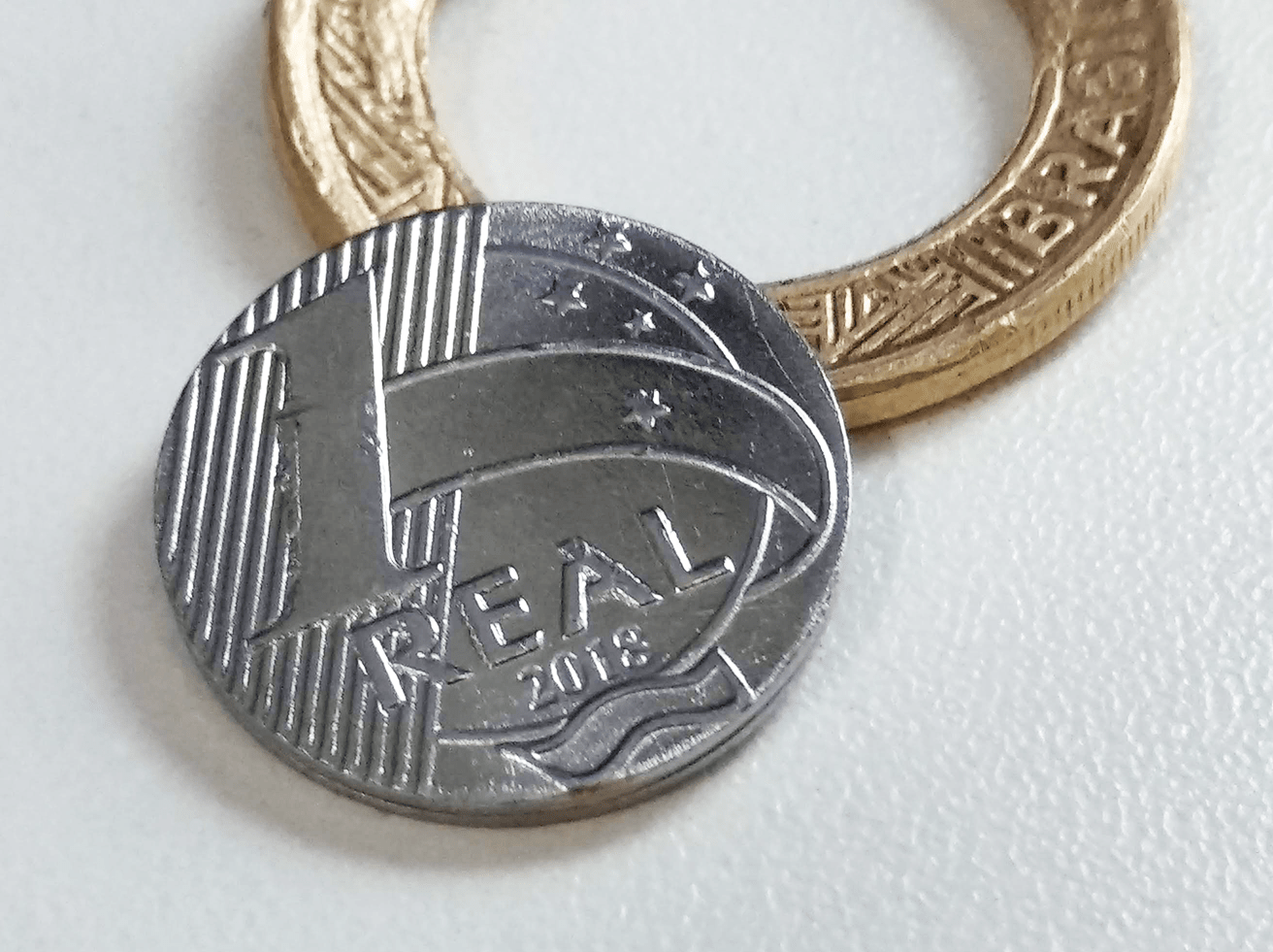
Separated parts of the second series, post-2002 R$1 coin

In 1998, a second series of coins was introduced. It featured copper-plated steel coins of 1 and 5 centavos, bronze-plated steel 10 and 25 centavos, cupronickel 50 centavos coin, and a bimetallic nickel-brass and cupronickel coin of 1 real. In 2002 cupronickel was replaced with stainless steel for the 50-centavo coin and the central part of the 1-real coin, and the nickel-brass ring was changed to a bronze-plated steel one.

In November 2005, the Central Bank discontinued the production of the 1 centavo coins, but the existing ones continue to be legal tender.

Second series
Image	Value	Design
	1 centavo (no longer produced)	Obverse: The Southern Cross in right upper side. Reverse: Depicts Pedro Álvares Cabral, Portuguese sea captain and Brazil's colonizer, with a 16th-century Portuguese ship in the background.
	5 centavos	Obverse: The Southern Cross in right upper side. Reverse: Depicts Joaquim José da Silva Xavier (also known as Tiradentes), martyr of an early independence movement known as the Minas Conspiracy. In the background, a triangle, symbol of the movement, and a dove, symbol of peace and freedom.
	10 centavos	Obverse: The Southern Cross in right upper side. Reverse: Depicts Emperor Pedro I, Brazil's first monarch. In the background, the Emperor on a horse: a scene alluding to the proclamation of independence.
	25 centavos	Obverse: The Southern Cross in right upper side. Reverse: Depicts Field Marshal Deodoro da Fonseca, Brazil's first Republican president. The Republic's coat of arms is in the background.
	50 centavos	Obverse: The Southern Cross in right upper side. Reverse: Depicts José Paranhos, Jr., the Baron of Rio Branco, the country's most distinguished Minister of Foreign Affairs. In the background, image of the country with ripples expanding outwards, representing the development of Brazil's foreign policy and the expansion and demarcation of the national borders.
	1 real	Obverse: The Southern Cross in right upper side. Reverse: Outer ring depicts a sample of the marajoara art pattern. In the inner ring, the Efígie da República, symbol of the Republic.

In November 2019, the Central Bank had the Royal Dutch Mint produce 5 centavos and 50 centavos coins, which have a distinctive letter "A" to indicate they weren't minted by Casa da Moeda.

Coins minted by the Royal Dutch Mint

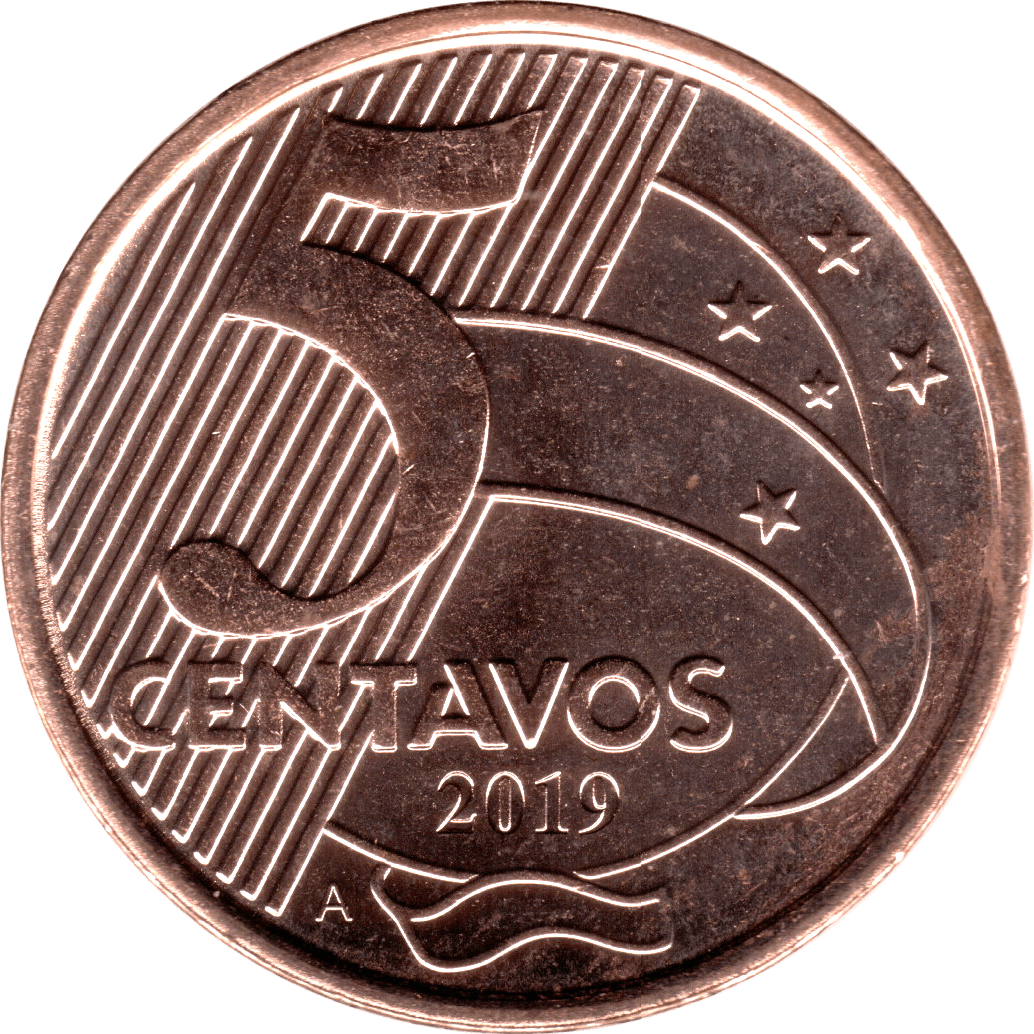
5 centavos coin with mint mark

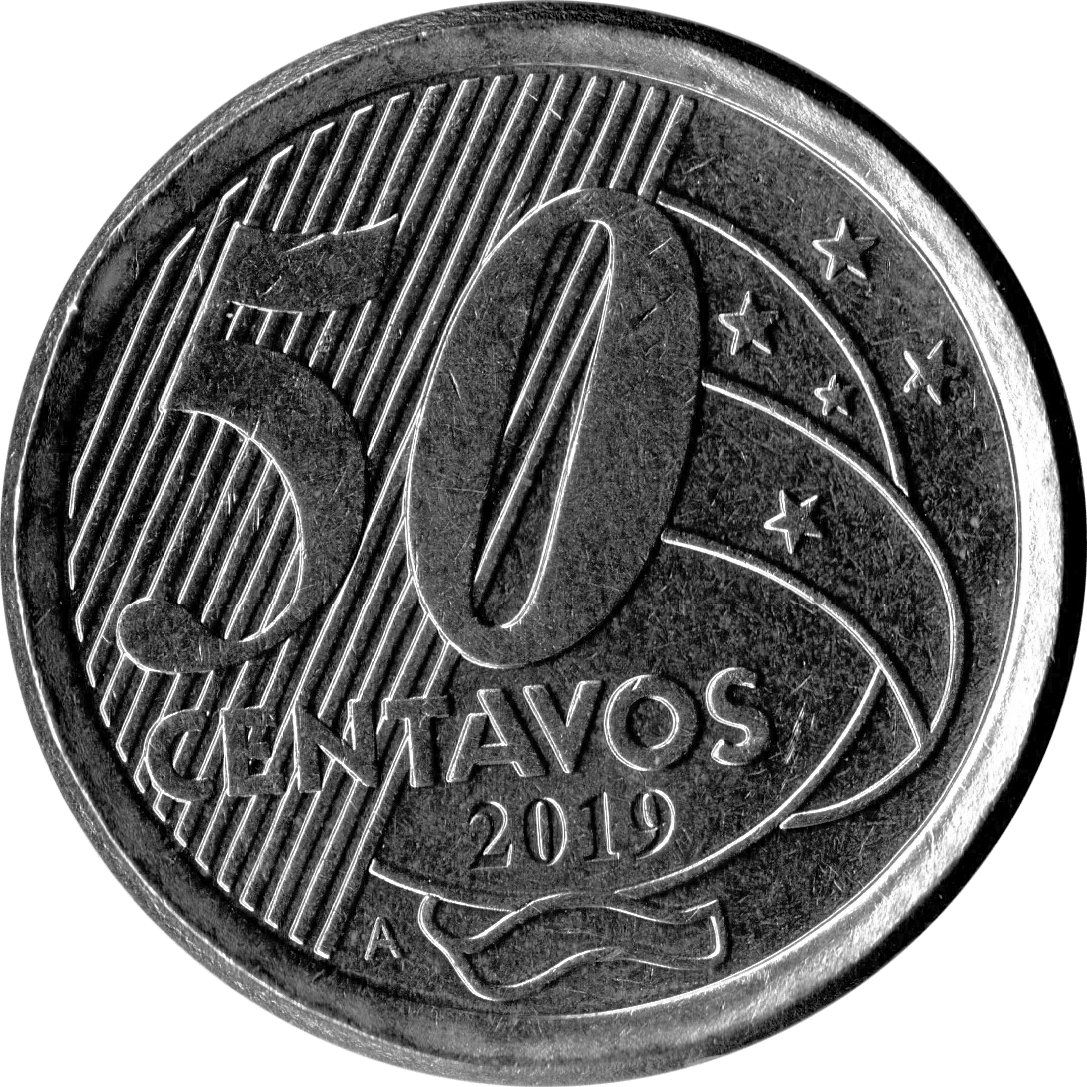
50 centavos coin with mint mark

==== Commemorative coins ====
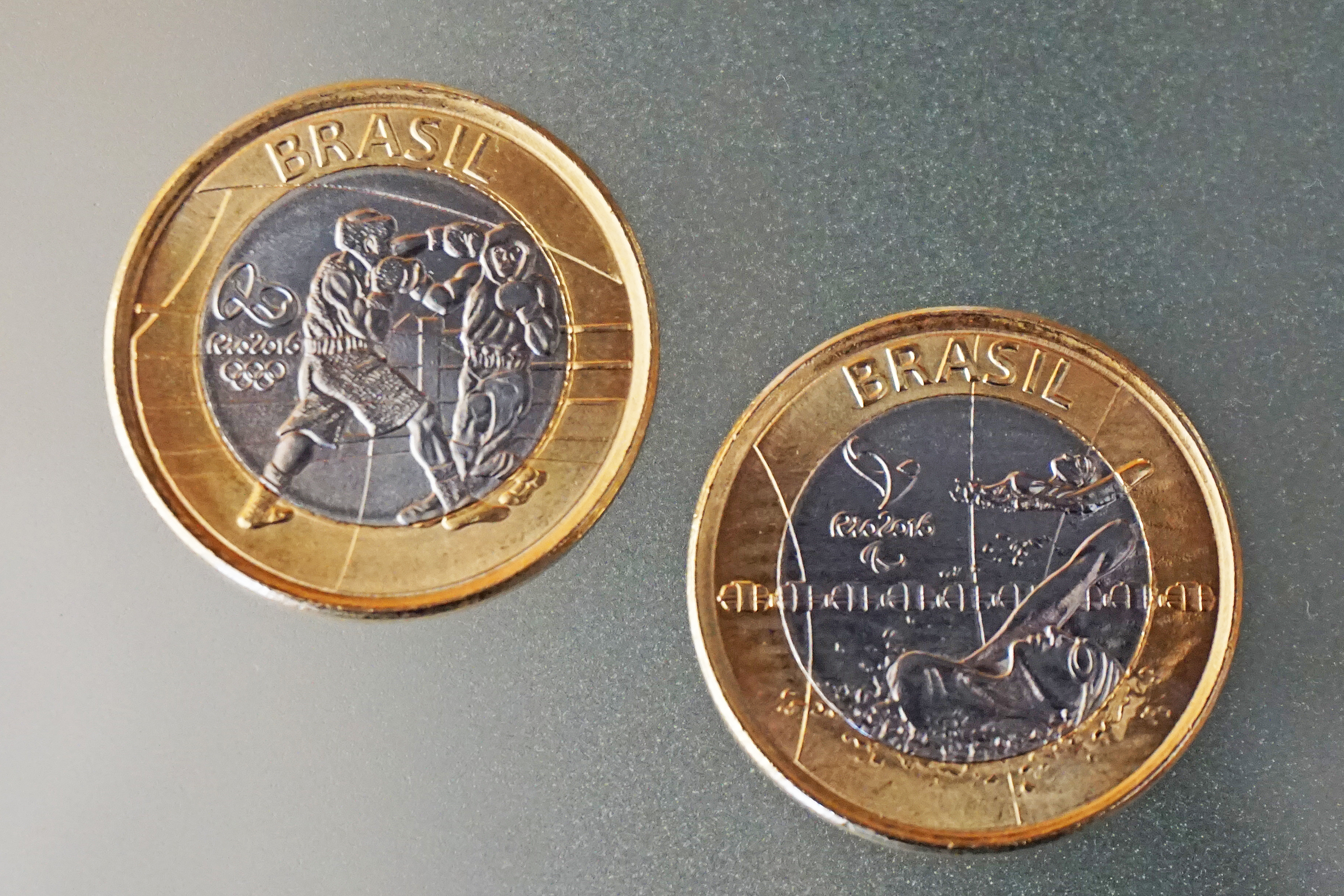
Commemorative 1 real coins for the 2016 Summer Olympics and Paralympics Games in Rio de Janeiro. Left, allegory to Olympic boxing, right, allegory to Paralympic swimming.

On occasion, the Central Bank of Brazil has issued special commemorative versions of some of the standard coins. These commemorative coins are legal tender, and usually differ from the standard design only on their reverse side.

Until 2009, there were three circulating commemorative coin designs, from 1998, 2002 and 2005:

Circulating commemorative coins of the Brazilian real's second series (1998–2009)
Image	Value	Details
	1 real	Release date: 10 December 1998; Occasion: The 50th anniversary of the Universal Declaration of Human Rights; Units produced: 600 thousand Reverse: The official logo of the commemorations; in bas-relief, a human figure. On the outer ring, the inscriptions "Declaração Universal dos Direitos Humanos" (Universal Declaration of Human Rights) and "Cinqüentenário" (50th anniversary).
	1 real	Release date: 12 September 2002; Occasion: The 100th birth anniversary of Brazilian former president Juscelino Kubitschek; Units produced: 50 million Reverse: A face portrait of Kubitschek. Vertically, the inscription "Centenário Juscelino Kubitschek" (Juscelino Kubitschek's centenary). On the outer ring, images alluding to the columns of the Alvorada Palace, the presidential residence in Brasília, the city that he decided would be built.
	1 real	Release date: 23 September 2005; Occasion: The 40th anniversary of the foundation of the Central Bank of Brazil; Units produced: 40 million Reverse: Image of the trademark Central Bank building, inspired in the official logo developed for the commemorations. On the outer ring, the inscriptions "Banco Central do Brasil" (Central Bank of Brazil) and "1965 40 anos 2005" (1965 40 years 2005).

Between 2010 and 2019, many circulating commemorative coins were issued, celebrating the Rio 2016 Summer Olympics. The 50th anniversary of the Central Bank and the 25th anniversary of the Real were also commemorated:

Circulating commemorative coins of the Brazilian real's second series (2010–2019)
Image	Value	Details
	1 real	Release date: 13 August 2012; Occasion: The Olympic Flag Handover for the Rio 2016 Summer Olympics; Units produced: 2 million Reverse: The Olympic Flag in a pole above the official logo of the Games of the XXXI Olympiad. In the outer ring, the inscriptions "Entrega da Bandeira Olímpica" (Olympic Flag Handover) and "Londres 2012—Rio 2016" (London 2012—Rio 2016)
	1 real	Release dates: 28 November 2014, 17 April 2015, 7 August 2015, 19 February 2016 (four sets of four designs); Occasion: 2016 Summer Olympics; Units produced: 20 million for each design Reverse: Sixteen coin designs, representing athletics (triple jump), swimming, paralympic triathlon, golf, basketball, sailing, paralympic canoeing, rugby, football, volleyball, paralympic athletics (running), judo, boxing, paralympic swimming, and each mascot of the 2016 Summer Olympics and Paralympics.
	1 real	Release date: 30 March 2015; Occasion: The 50th anniversary of the foundation of the Central Bank of Brazil; Units produced: 50 million Reverse: The Central Bank building, its logo, and the inscription "50 anos" (50 years).
	1 real	Release date: 28 August 2019; Occasion: The 25th anniversary of the creation of the Plano Real (1994–2019); Units produced: 25 million Reverse: A hummingbird feeding its chicks, the same illustration previously used on the 1 real banknote.

There were no circulating commemorative coins for the 200th anniversary of the Independence of Brazil, in 2022. Instead, the first circulating commemorative coin after the COVID-19 pandemic in Brazil was released in 2024, for the 30th anniversary of the Real:

Circulating commemorative coins of the Brazilian real's second series (2020–2029)
Image	Value	Details
	1 real	Release date: 24 September 2024; Occasion: The 30th anniversary of the creation of the Plano Real (1994–2024); Units produced: 45 million Reverse: On the outer ring, the texts "30 years of the Real" and "1994 · 2024". On the inner disc, the Efígie da República, symbol of the Republic, alongside the symbol "R$".
	1 real	Release date: 25 July 2025; Occasion: The 60th anniversary of the foundation of the Central Bank of Brazil; Units produced: 23,168,000; Reverse: On the outer ring, the texts "Banco Central do Brasil" and "1965-2025". On the inner disc, the logo of the Central Bank, 6 slanted stripes and the text "60 anos" (60 years).

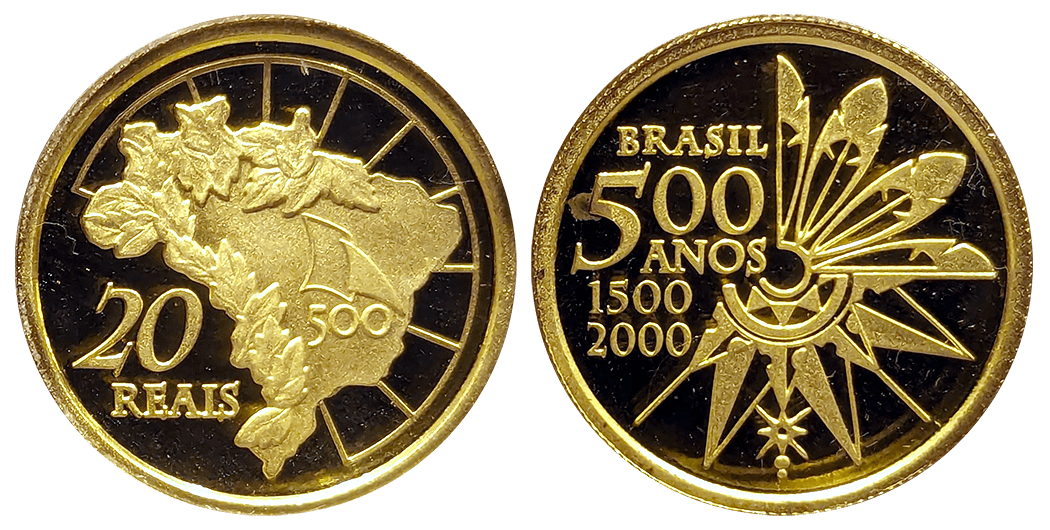
The 2000 R$20 non-circulating commemorative coin celebrating the 500th anniversary of Brazil's discovery by the Portuguese (1500–2000)

Similarly to the first series, non-circulating commemorative coins have also been minted, with the following non-standard face values: R$2, R$5, R$10 and R$20 coins. Likewise, even if they are worth more than their face value to collectors, they are nevertheless legal tender.

There were 18 types of non-circulating commemorative coins released from 2000 through 2009:

Non-circulating commemorative coins of the Brazilian real's second series (2000–2009)
Value	Details
5 reais	Release date: 27 October 2000; Occasion: 500th anniversary of Brazil's discovery by the Portuguese (1500–2000); Units produced: 15.286
20 reais	Release date: 27 October 2000; Occasion: 500th anniversary of Brazil's discovery by the Portuguese (1500–2000); Units produced: 6.558
2 reais	Release date: 12 September 2002; Occasion: 100th anniversary of the birth of Juscelino Kubitschek (1902–2002); Units produced: 11.414
20 reais	Release date: 12 September 2002; Occasion: 100th anniversary of the birth of Juscelino Kubitschek (1902–2002); Units produced: 2.499
2 reais	Release date: 12 December 2002; Occasion: 100th anniversary of the birth of Carlos Drummond de Andrade (1902–2002); Units produced: 6.959
20 reais	Release date: 12 December 2002; Occasion: 100th anniversary of the birth of Carlos Drummond de Andrade (1902–2002); Units produced: 2.499
5 reais	Release date: 20 December 2002; Occasion: Commemorating Brazil's 5th FIFA World Cup win Units produced: 9.999
20 reais	Release date: 20 December 2002; Occasion: Commemorating Brazil's 5th FIFA World Cup win Units produced: 2.499
2 reais	Release date: 2 August 2003; Occasion: 100th anniversary of the birth of Ary Barroso (1903–2003); Units produced: 4.958
20 reais	Release date: 2 August 2003; Occasion: 100th anniversary of the birth of Ary Barroso (1903–2003); Units produced: 2.481
2 reais	Release date: 18 December 2003; Occasion: 100th anniversary of the birth of Candido Portinari (1903–2003); Units produced: 2 thousand
2 reais	Release date: 30 January 2004; Occasion: 100th anniversary of FIFA (1904–2004); Units produced: 12.166
20 reais	Release date: 30 January 2004; Occasion: 100th anniversary of FIFA (1904–2004); Units produced: 4.060
2 reais	Release date: 23 October 2006; Occasion: 100th anniversary of the Santos-Dumont 14-bis' famous flight (1906–2006); Units produced: 4 thousand
2 reais	Release date: 4 April 2007; Occasion: Commemorating the 2007 Pan American Games, which took place in Rio de Janeiro; Units produced: 10 thousand
5 reais	Release date: 4 April 2007; Occasion: Commemorating the 2007 Pan American Games, which took place in Rio de Janeiro; Units produced: 4 thousand
5 reais	Release date: 4 April 2007; Occasion: 200th anniversary of the arrival of the Portuguese royal family (1808–2008); Units produced: 2 thousand
2 reais	Release date: 18 June 2008; Occasion: 100th anniversary of the first Japanese immigration to Brazil (via the Kasato Maru ship) (1908–2008); Units produced: 10 thousand

From 2010 through 2019, 15 types of non-circulating commemorative coins were released:

Non-circulating commemorative coins of the Brazilian real's second series (2010–2019)
Value	Details
5 reais	Release date: 21 April 2010; Occasion: 50th anniversary of the foundation of Brasília, capital of Brazil (1960–2010); Units produced: 6 thousand
5 reais	Release date: 21 May 2010; Occasion: Commemorating the 2010 FIFA World Cup; Units produced: 9 thousand
5 reais	Release date: 1 July 2011; Occasion: 100th anniversary of Ouro Preto, former capital of Minas Gerais (1711–2011); Units produced: 2 thousand
5 reais	Release date: 13 August 2012; Occasion: The Olympic Flag Handover for the Rio 2016 Summer Olympics; Units produced: 14.127
5 reais	Release date: 29 October 2012; Occasion: Commemorating the United Nations's International Year of Cooperatives (2012); Units produced: 5 thousand
5 reais	Release date: 15 November 2012; Occasion: Commemorating the city of Goiás, former capital of the state of Goiás; Units produced: 3 thousand
5 reais	Release date: 6 December 2013; Occasion: Commemorating the city of Diamantina, Minas Gerais; Units produced: 3 thousand
10 reais	Release date: 29 January 2014; Occasion: Commemorating the 2014 FIFA World Cup, which took place in Brazil; Units produced: 5 thousand
5 reais	Release date: 29 January 2014; Occasion: Commemorating the 2014 FIFA World Cup, which took place in Brazil; Units produced (2 versions): 17.819 (mascot); 19.038 (globe)
2 reais	Release date: 29 January 2014; Occasion: Commemorating the 2014 FIFA World Cup, which took place in Brazil; Units produced (6 versions): 19.959 (goalkeeper); 19.929 (chest); 19.723 (heading); 19.802 (pass); 19.952 (dribble); 19.993 (goal)
10 reais	Release date: 28 November 2014 (100 metres); 17 April 2015 (pole vault); 7 August 2015 (freestyle wrestling); 19 February 2016 (Olympic torch); Occasion: Commemorating the 2016 Summer Olympics, which took place in Rio de Janeiro; Units produced: 5 thousand (each)
5 reais	Release date: 28 November 2014; 17 April 2015; 7 August 2015; 19 February 2016; Occasion: Commemorating the 2016 Summer Olympics, which took place in Rio de Janeiro; Units produced (4 versions): 18.700 + 17.500 + 18 thousand + 13.850 (rowing); 18.700 + 17.500 + 17 thousand + 13.900 (cycling); 18.700 + 17.500 + 17 thousand + 13.300 (athletics); 18.700 + 17.500 + 17.759 + 13.750 (beach volleyball)
5 reais	Release date: 5 December 2014; Occasion: Commemorating the city of São Luís, capital of Maranhão; Units produced: 3 thousand
5 reais	Release date: 3 December 2015; Occasion: Commemorating the city of Salvador, capital of Bahia; Units produced: 3 thousand
5 reais	Release date: 25 November 2016; Occasion: Commemorating the city of Olinda, a city in Pernambuco; Units produced: 3 thousand

Since 2020, 3 types of non-circulating commemorative coins were released:

Non-circulating commemorative coins of the Brazilian real's second series (2020–2029)
Value	Details
2 reais	Release date: 26 July 2022; Occasion: 200th anniversary of the Independence of Brazil (1822–2022); Units produced: 40.000 (as of 10 June 2024; 40.000 authorized)
5 reais	Release date: 26 July 2022; Occasion: 200th anniversary of the Independence of Brazil (1822–2022); Units produced: 15.013 (as of 10 June 2024; 20.000 authorized)
5 reais	Release date: 11 April 2024; Occasion: 200th anniversary of the first Constitution of Brazil and the creation of the Brazilian legislative body (1824–2024); Units produced: 5.614 (as of 10 June 2024; 10.000 authorized)

==== Trial strike controversy ====
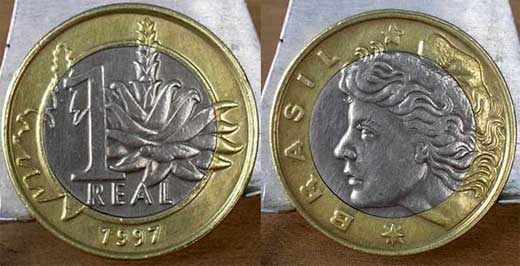
Balsemão's trial strike, nicknamed the "Real Bromélia" or "Real Balsemão"

In 2011, a collector named Pedro Pinto Balsemão claimed to have found a trial strike of the R$1, with a never before seen design, completely different from circulating 1 real coins. Despite the initial skepticism, it was later supposedly confirmed via freedom of information requests and interviews that Casa da Moeda do Brasil had minted trial strikes of the R$1 coin prior to the currency design change in 1998, with custom designs that were different from the final product in order to avoid leaks.

In May 2021, however, Bentes Group published an explanation as to why the "Real Bromélia" was not included in their Brazilian coins catalog. They claim to have done extensive research into the piece, and to have concluded that it is not a trial strike or test coin, but instead a sort of vending machine token with no numismatic value.

== Banknotes ==
=== First series (1994–2010) ===
In 1994, banknotes print "A" were issued by Casa da Moeda do Brasil in denominations of 1, 5, 10, 50 and 100 reais, in addition to supplementary issues of banknotes ordered abroad in the values of 5, 10 and 50 reais of the print "B" produced abroad by the companies Giesecke+Devrient, Thomas de la Rue and François-Charles Oberthur Fiduciaire respectively. In 1997, modified banknotes of 1 real (print "B"), 5 and 10 reais (print "C") were launched, bearing the national flag as a watermark instead of the effigy of the republic in order to reduce the risk of such banknotes being used for counterfeiting banknotes at higher denominations. In 2000, the 10 reais commemorative banknote (print "D") was launched, and this banknote was the first polymer banknote to be issued in the country. In 2001 and 2002, the 2 and 20 reais banknotes were launched, respectively, using the sea turtle and the golden lion tamarin in the watermark and theme, and the 20 reais banknote was the first to make use of holographic elements on the Brazilian banknotes. In 2003, the print "C" of the 1 real banknote was put into circulation, which would have the name "República Federativa do Brasil" at the top in the place where the name "Banco Central do Brasil" was customarily placed, which was placed on the under the obverse of the bill, next to the word real. Such banknote ceased to be issued in 2005.

First series
Image		Value	Dimensions	Description	
Obverse	Reverse	Value	Dimensions	Obverse	Reverse
		1 real	140 mm × 65 mm	The Republic's Effigy, portrayed as a bust	Sapphire-spangled emerald hummingbird (Amazilia lactea)
		2 reais	140 mm × 65 mm	The Republic's Effigy, portrayed as a bust	Hawksbill turtle (Eretmochelys imbricata)
		5 reais	140 mm × 65 mm	The Republic's Effigy, portrayed as a bust	Great egret (Casmerodius albus)
		10 reais	140 mm × 65 mm	The Republic's Effigy, portrayed as a bust	Green-winged macaw (Ara chlorepterus)
		20 reais	140 mm × 65 mm	The Republic's Effigy, portrayed as a bust	Golden lion tamarin (Leontopithecus rosalia)
		50 reais	140 mm × 65 mm	The Republic's Effigy, portrayed as a bust	Jaguar (Onça pintada, Panthera onca)
		100 reais	140 mm × 65 mm	The Republic's Effigy, portrayed as a bust	Dusky Grouper (Epinephelus marginatus)

==== Commemorative banknotes ====
In April 2000, in commemoration of the 500th anniversary of the Portuguese arrival on Brazilian shores, the Brazilian Central Bank released a polymer 10 real banknote that circulated along with the other banknotes above. The Brazilian Mint printed 250 million of these notes, which at the time accounted for about half of the 10 real banknotes in circulation.

Obverse	Reverse	Value	Year	Material	Description
		10 reais	2000	Polymer	Obverse: Image of Pedro Álvares Cabral, the colonizer of Brazil. Reverse: Stylized version of the map of Brazil, with pictures highlighting the ethnic and cultural plurality of the country.

=== Second series (2010–present) ===
On 3 February 2010, the Central Bank of Brazil announced the new series of the real banknotes which would begin to be released in April 2010. The new design added security enhancements in an attempt to reduce counterfeiting. The notes have different sizes according to their values to help vision-impaired people. The changes were made reflecting the growth of the Brazilian economy and the need for a stronger and safer currency. The new banknotes began to enter circulation in December 2010, coexisting with the older ones. On 29 July 2020, the Central Bank of Brazil announced the release of the 200 reais banknote. It was released into circulation on 2 September 2020.

Second series
Image		Value	Dimensions	Main color	Description		Date of first issue	Watermark
Obverse	Reverse	Value	Dimensions	Main color	Obverse	Reverse	Date of first issue	Watermark
		2 reais	121 mm × 65 mm	Blue	Wave pattern; head of Republic	Hawksbill turtle (Eretmochelys imbricata)	29 July 2013	Hawksbill turtle and electrotype 2
		5 reais	128 mm x 65 mm	Purple	Plants; head of Republic	Great egret (Casmerodius albus)	29 July 2013	Great egret and electrotype 5
		10 reais	135 mm × 65 mm	Red	Plants; head of Republic	Green-winged macaw (Ara chlorepterus)	23 July 2012	Green-winged macaw and electrotype 10
		20 reais	142 mm × 65 mm	Yellow	Plants; head of Republic	Golden lion tamarin (Leontopithecus rosalia)	23 July 2012	Golden lion tamarin and electrotype 20
		50 reais	149 mm × 70 mm	Brown	Jungle plants; head of Republic	Jaguar (Panthera onca)	13 December 2010	Jaguar and electrotype 50
		100 reais	156 mm × 70 mm	Cyan	Underwater plants and starfish; head of Republic; coral	Dusky Grouper (Epinephelus marginatus); coral	13 December 2010	Dusky Grouper and electrotype 100
		200 reais	142 mm × 65 mm	Grey	Savanna plants; head of Republic	Maned wolf (Chrysocyon brachyurus)	2 September 2020	Maned wolf and electrotype 200

Among the security features of the second series is ultraviolet printing in the design, referred to as "fluorescent elements". These appear and glow under ultraviolet light.

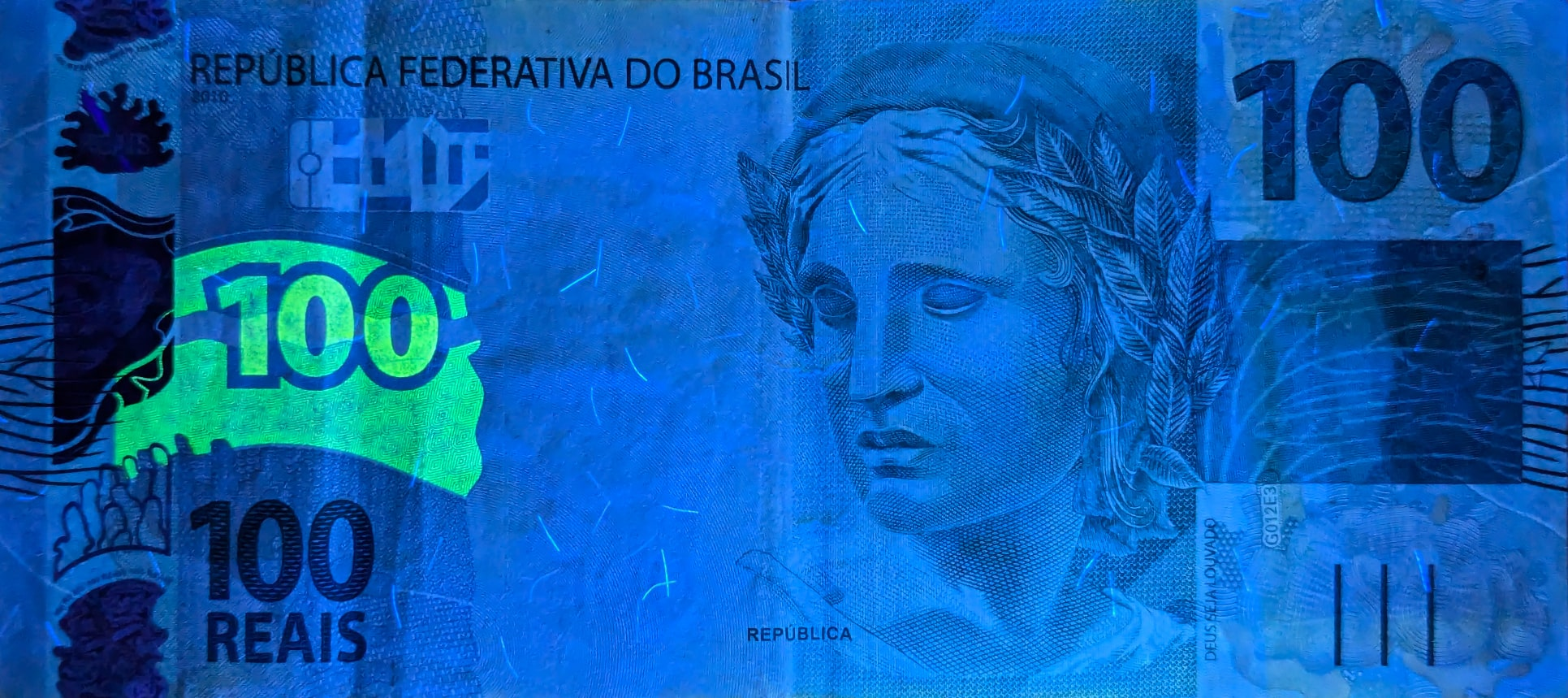

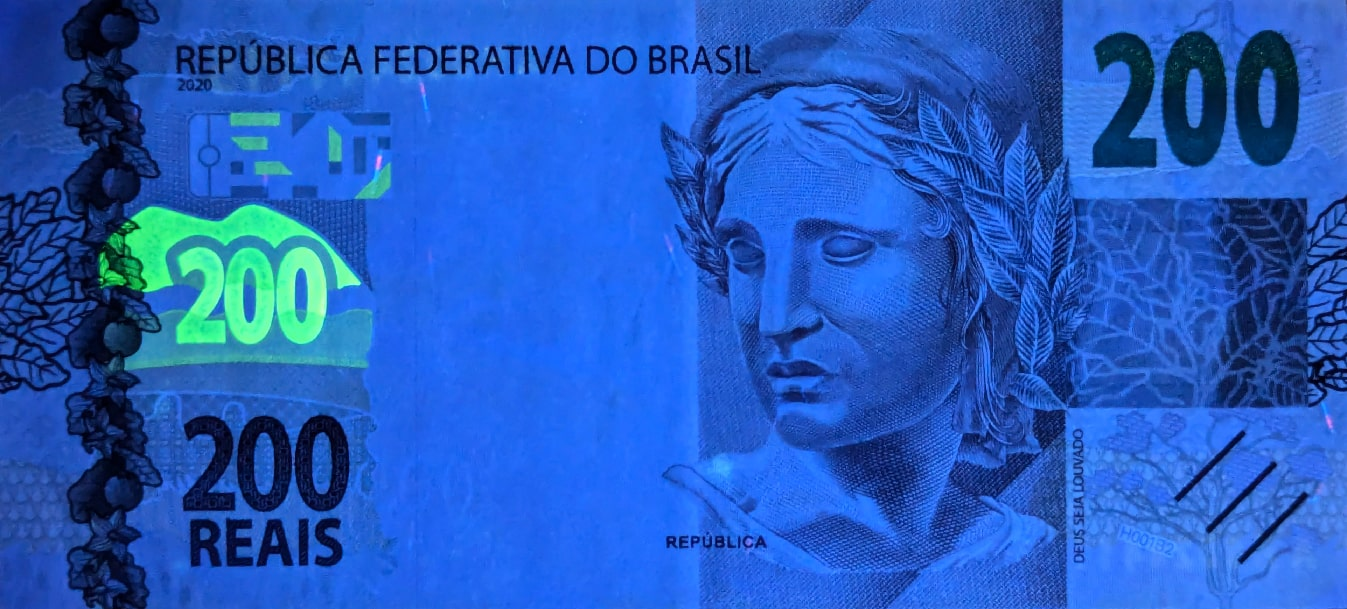

== Exchange rates ==
=== Current exchange rates ===
Current BRL exchange rates
From Google Finance:	AUD CAD CHF CNY EUR GBP HKD JPY USD ARS
From Yahoo! Finance:	AUD CAD CHF CNY EUR GBP HKD JPY USD ARS
From XE.com:	AUD CAD CHF CNY EUR GBP HKD JPY USD ARS
From OANDA:	AUD CAD CHF CNY EUR GBP HKD JPY USD ARS

=== Historical exchange rate ===
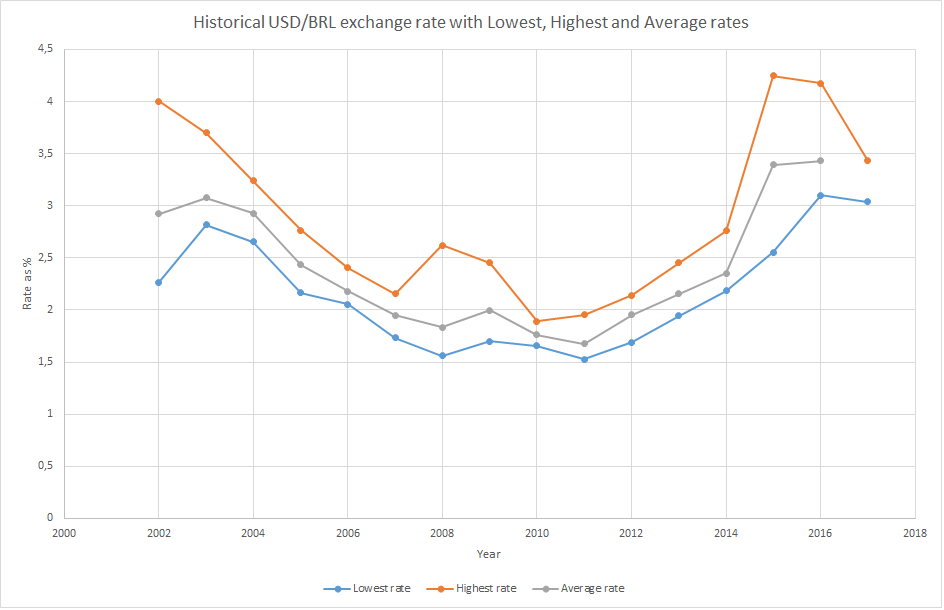
Historical US$/BRL exchange rate with Lowest, Highest and Average rates

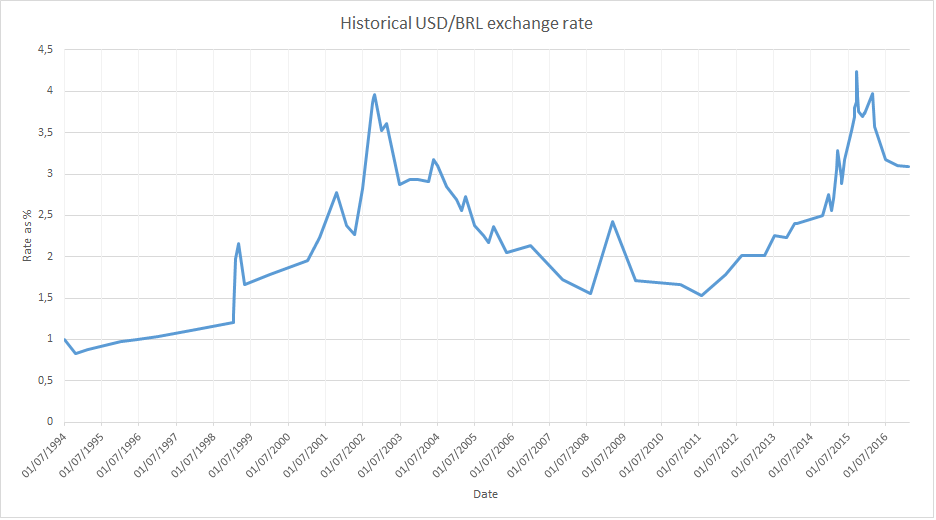
Historical US$/BRL exchange rate

The cost of one Euro in Brazilian real.

Brazilian Reais per US dollar 2002–2021
Year	Lowest ↓		Highest ↑		Average
Year	Date	Rate	Date	Rate	Rate
2002	11 April	2.2640	10 October	4.0050	2.9221
2003	2 July	2.818	14 February	3.7000	3.0780
2004	30 December	2.6540	22 May	3.2420	2.9260
2005	11 November	2.1630	15 March	2.7660	2.4349
2006	5 May	2.0560	24 May	2.4050	2.1782
2007	14 November	1.732	5 January	2.153	1.948
2008	31 July	1.5620	5 December	2.6210	1.8349
2009	15 October	1.698	2 March	2.4510	1.9974
2010	13 October	1.6550	5 February	1.8910	1.7603
2011	26 July	1.5284	22 September	1.9520	1.6750
2012	29 February	1.6920	3 December	2.1395	1.9546
2013	11 March	1.9430	21 August	2.4523	2.1576
2014	10 April	2.1825	16 December	2.7614	2.3531
2015	22 January	2.5554	23 September	4.2491	3.3910
2016	25 October	3.1023	22 January	4.1737	3.4300
2017	16 February	3.0390	19 May	3.3703	3.1855
2018	25 January	3.1463	14 September	4.2066	3.6644
2019	1 February	3.6447	28 November	4.2640	3.9437
2020	2 January	4.0195	14 May	5.8887	5.2420
2021	25 June	4.9142	14 September	5.8757	5.3975

Date	Rate
1994-07-01	1.00
1994-10-14	0.83
1995-02-15	0.88
1995-12-29	0.97
1996-06-11	1.00
1996-12-31	1.04
1997-12-31	1.12
1998-12-31	1.20
1999-01-12	1.21
1999-01-13	1.31
1999-01-29	1.98
1999-03-03	2.16
1999-04-30	1.66
1999-12-31	1.78
2000-12-31	1.96
2001-05-02	2.23
2001-10-15	2.78
2002-01-25	2.38
2002-04-12	2.27
2002-06-27	2.83
2002-09-30	3.87
2002-10-12	3.93
2002-10-22	3.96
2002-12-27	3.53
2003-02-18	3.61
2003-06-28	2.87
2003-09-30	2.93
2003-12-28	2.93
2004-03-31	2.91
2004-05-23	3.18
2004-06-28	3.10
2004-09-30	2.85
2004-12-28	2.69
2005-02-19	2.56
2005-03-26	2.73
2005-06-28	2.38
2005-09-25	2.26
2005-11-11	2.17
2005-12-28	2.36
2006-03-27	2.15
2006-05-07	2.05
2006-12-29	2.13
2007-11-07	1.73
2008-08-01	1.56
2009-03-03	2.42
2009-10-14	1.71
2010-12-30	1.66
2011-07-23	1.53
2012-03-18	1.79
2012-08-19	2.01
2013-03-31	2.01
2013-07-13	2.26
2013-11-01	2.23
2014-01-23	2.40
2014-02-06	2.40
2014-10-23	2.50
2014-12-16	2.75
2015-01-22	2.56
2015-02-02	2.71
2015-03-06	3.05
2015-03-19	3.29
2015-04-24	2.95
2015-04-28	2.88
2015-05-08	2.97
2015-05-29	3.18
2015-08-06	3.53
2015-09-01	3.69
2015-09-04	3.80
2015-09-17	3.88
2015-09-22	4.05
2015-09-24	4.24
2015-09-25	3.97
2015-10-02	3.94
2015-10-09	3.75
2015-11-20	3.69
2015-12-03	3.74
2015-12-09	3.73
2016-02-23	3.97
2016-03-13	3.58
2016-06-30	3.18
2016-10-25	3.10
2017-02-14	3.09
2017-05-30	3.26
2017-07-28	3.17
2017-10-30	3.25
2017-12-29	3.30
2018-04-30	3.48
2018-08-30	4.18
2018-12-28	3.87
2019-04-30	3.97
2019-08-30	4.13
2019-12-30	4.03
2020-02-28	4.49
2020-04-30	5.42
2020-05-13	5.90
2020-08-28	5.46
2020-12-30	5.19
2021-03-30	5.76
2021-08-30	5.19
2021-12-30	5.58
2022-04-29	4.91
2022-08-28	5.06
2022-12-30	5.21
2023-04-28	5.00
2023-08-30	4.86
2023-12-29	4.84
2024-03-28	4.99
2024-05-29	5.19
2024-06-28	5.55
2024-08-30	5.65
2024-10-30	5.78
2024-12-27	6.19

Most traded currencies by value Currency distribution of global foreign exchange market turnover
Currency	ISO 4217 code	Proportion of daily volume		Change (2022–2025)
Currency	ISO 4217 code	April 2022	April 2025	Change (2022–2025)
United States dollar	USD	88.4%	89.2%	▲0.8pp
Euro	EUR	30.6%	28.9%	▼1.7pp
Japanese yen	JPY	16.7%	16.8%	▲0.1pp
Pound sterling	GBP	12.9%	10.2%	▼2.7pp
Renminbi	CNY	7.0%	8.5%	▲1.5pp
Swiss franc	CHF	5.2%	6.4%	▲1.2pp
Australian dollar	AUD	6.4%	6.1%	▼0.3pp
Canadian dollar	CAD	6.2%	5.8%	▼0.4pp
Hong Kong dollar	HKD	2.6%	3.8%	▲1.2pp
Singapore dollar	SGD	2.4%	2.4%	Steady
Indian rupee	INR	1.6%	1.9%	▲0.3pp
South Korean won	KRW	1.8%	1.8%	Steady
Swedish krona	SEK	2.2%	1.6%	▼0.6pp
Mexican peso	MXN	1.5%	1.6%	▲0.1pp
New Zealand dollar	NZD	1.7%	1.5%	▼0.2pp
Norwegian krone	NOK	1.7%	1.3%	▼0.4pp
New Taiwan dollar	TWD	1.1%	1.2%	▲0.1pp
Brazilian real	BRL	0.9%	0.9%	Steady
South African rand	ZAR	1.0%	0.8%	▼0.2pp
Polish złoty	PLN	0.7%	0.8%	▲0.1pp
Danish krone	DKK	0.7%	0.7%	Steady
Indonesian rupiah	IDR	0.4%	0.7%	▲0.3pp
Turkish lira	TRY	0.4%	0.5%	▲0.1pp
Thai baht	THB	0.4%	0.5%	▲0.1pp
Israeli new shekel	ILS	0.4%	0.4%	Steady
Hungarian forint	HUF	0.3%	0.4%	▲0.1pp
Czech koruna	CZK	0.4%	0.4%	Steady
Chilean peso	CLP	0.3%	0.3%	Steady
Philippine peso	PHP	0.2%	0.2%	Steady
Colombian peso	COP	0.2%	0.2%	Steady
Malaysian ringgit	MYR	0.2%	0.2%	Steady
UAE dirham	AED	0.4%	0.1%	▼0.3pp
Saudi riyal	SAR	0.2%	0.1%	▼0.1pp
Romanian leu	RON	0.1%	0.1%	Steady
Peruvian sol	PEN	0.1%	0.1%	Steady
Other currencies		2.6%	3.4%	▲0.8pp
Total (Note: The total sum is 200% because each currency trade is counted twice: once for the currency being bought and once for the currency being sold. The percentages above represent the proportion of all trades involving a given currency, regardless of which side of the transaction it is on.)		200.0%	200.0%	

== See also ==
- Casa da Moeda do Brasil
- Central Bank of Brazil
- Economy of Brazil
- Plano Real
- Portuguese real

== Notes ==
Brazilian real (BRL)
Preceded by: Cruzeiro real (BRR); Reason: inflation Ratio: CR$2,750 = R$1	Currency of Brazil; 1 July 1994 –	Succeeded by: Current
