= Barry Goldwater Jr. =

American politician (born 1938)

- Goldwater in 2012

Member of the U.S. House of Representatives from California
- In office April 29, 1969 – January 3, 1983
- Preceded by: Edwin Reinecke
- Succeeded by: Bobbi Fiedler (redistricted)
- Constituency: 27th district (1969–1975); 20th district (1975–1983)

Personal details
- Born: Barry Morris Goldwater Jr. July 15, 1938 (age 88) Los Angeles, California, U.S.
- Party: Republican
- Spouse: Susan Lee Gherman (m. 1972; div. 1979)
- Children: 1
- Relatives: Barry Goldwater (father)
- Education: University of Colorado, Boulder; Arizona State University, Tempe (BS)

Barry Morris Goldwater Jr. (born July 15, 1938) is an American politician. He is a former Republican member of the United States House of Representatives from California, serving from 1969 to 1983. He is the son of U.S. Senator and 1964 Republican presidential nominee Barry Goldwater. Both served together father and son in the U.S. Congress through 1969-1983.

== Early life and education ==
Goldwater was born in Los Angeles, California, on July 15, 1938, the son of Barry Goldwater and his wife, the former Margaret Johnson. He graduated from Staunton Military Academy in Staunton, Virginia, in 1957. Goldwater attended the University of Colorado, and graduated from Arizona State University in 1962. He then worked as a stockbroker in Los Angeles, California and public relations executive, and in an import-export business, before being elected to Congress.

In 1972, he married Susan Lee Gherman, daughter of Dr. E. Mortimer and Irene Gherman of Newport Beach, California. They had a son, Barry M. Goldwater III. The couple divorced in May 1979.

== Political career ==
=== In office ===
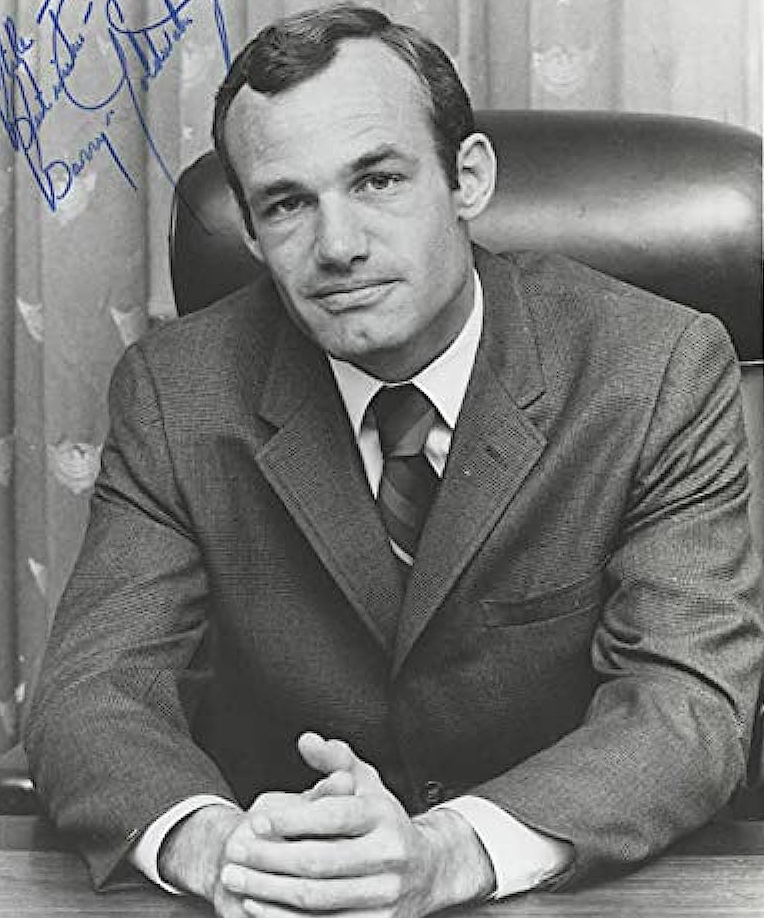
Goldwater during his tenure in Congress

California's 27th congressional district opened up in January 1969 when Edwin Reinecke resigned to accept an appointment as lieutenant governor of California. The district at the time covered eastern Kern County and parts of northern Los Angeles County. In primaries for the following special election, Goldwater was nominated by the Republicans and John Van de Kamp was nominated by the Democrats. Goldwater won the special general 57%-43%, serving for the remainder of the 91st Congress, and was re-elected twice. He then was redistricted to the 20th congressional district ahead of the 1974 election, and was elected to another four terms in that district.

During his time in Washington, Goldwater served on the Committee on Public Works and Transportation, the Joint Committee on Energy, and the Committee on Science and Technology. He drafted a number of bills while serving in the House, most notably the Privacy Act of 1974, which prevents the distribution of private information from government and businesses.

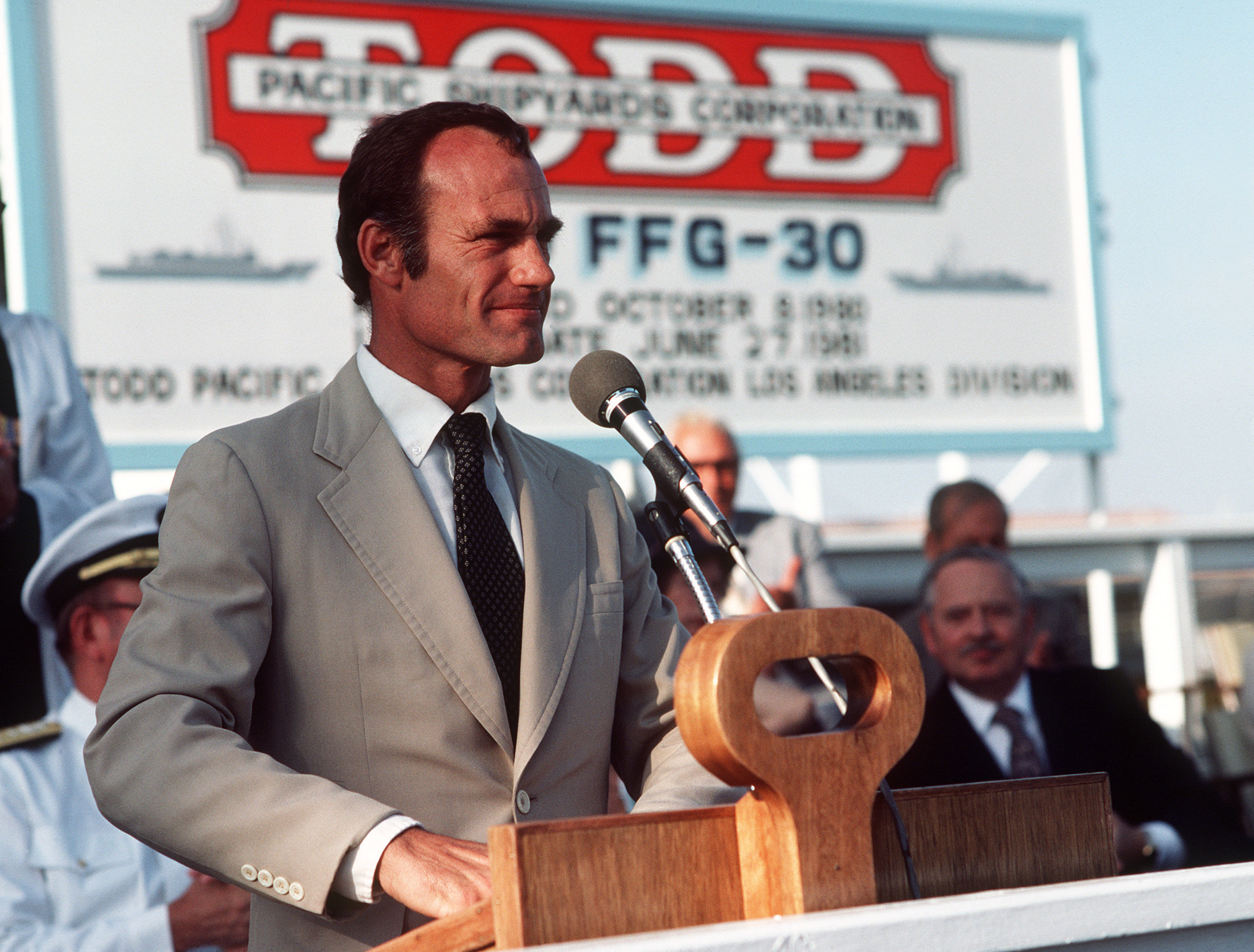
Goldwater speaking during the launch of USS Reid (FFG-30) in 1981

With his district merged with that of Bobbi Fiedler due to redistricting after the 1980 census, Goldwater retired from the House to run for the Republican U.S. Senate nomination in 1982. He lost the primary to San Diego Mayor Pete Wilson, who would go on to win the general election and who eventually became governor. Goldwater attributed his loss to a poorly ran campaign.

=== Advocacy ===
In the 1980 presidential election, Goldwater campaigned for Ronald Reagan, a family friend, who won the election against Jimmy Carter. Ahead of the 2003 recall election to replace Gray Davis as Governor of California, Goldwater supported Arnold Schwarzenegger, and had a public debate with President Reagan's son Ron Reagan.

On November 16, 2007, Goldwater endorsed Republican presidential candidate Ron Paul of Texas for the GOP nomination in 2008. On January 5, 2008, Goldwater announced he would go to New Hampshire to campaign for Paul, after the latter's 10% showing in the Iowa caucuses two days earlier. Paul would garner 8% of the vote in New Hampshire. Goldwater also spoke in support of Paul at the Kansas GOP caucus.

On September 4, 2008, a list of electors in Louisiana using the label "Louisiana Taxpayers Party" paid $500 and filed papers with the Secretary of State's office to get on the ballot. They were pledged to Paul for president and to Goldwater for vice president. The ticket received 9,368 votes in Louisiana, finishing third in the popular vote.

In 2015, Goldwater was chairman of TUSK – Tell Utilities Solar won't be Killed – "that aims at pushing solar from a different perspective: a Republican one". The group favored net metering. In the same policy area, the Goldwater Institute, a non-profit political think tank which studies and publishes findings on public policies that align with the conservative values promoted by Goldwater's father, "sued to have [Arizona]'s renewable energy standards and tariffs throw[n] out in a move that would have slowed solar development to a crawl". The effort failed, The Arizona Corporation Committee with Barry's urging found a compromise from all interest parties.

== Business career ==
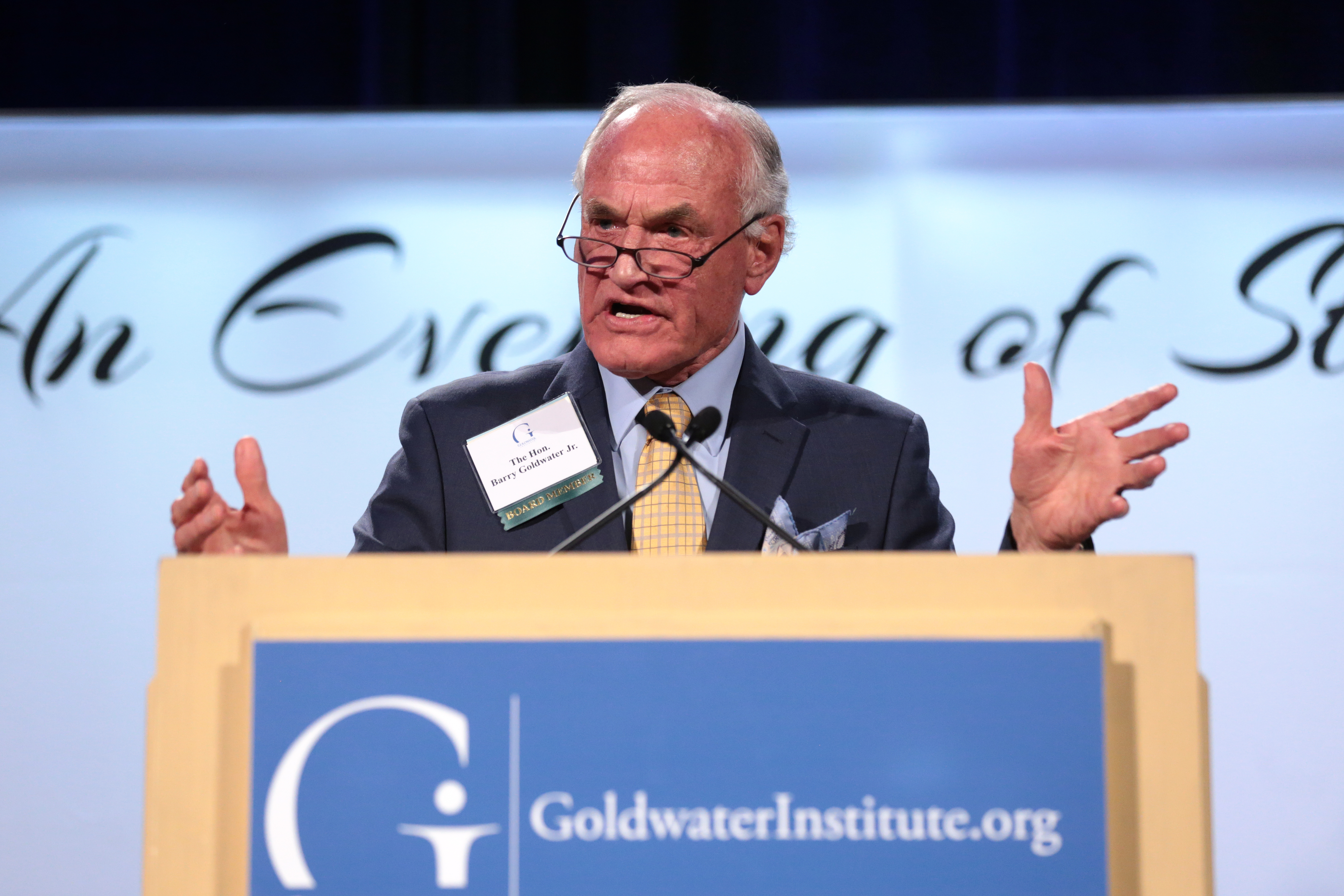
Goldwater in 2017

After retiring from politics, Goldwater returned to Los Angeles and pursued a career in the financial sector, specializing in security law and underwriting. His clients were major U.S. banks and insurance companies. Goldwater became a member of the New York Stock Exchange, and a partner in what is now Wedbush Securities (formerly Noble Cook, Inc.).

Goldwater lives in Phoenix, Arizona, near his son Barry M. Goldwater III. He has served on the board of the Barry M. Goldwater Scholarship and Excellence in Education Program. As of October 2018, he serves on the board of directors of the Goldwater Institute. Goldwater generally supports legislation and policies that embrace economic independence, individual rights, limited government and personal responsibility.

He maintains contact with Republican and Democratic leaders, as well as celebrity activists, and is still active in the conservative political movement. He is a member of the American Numismatic Association, and is currently on the board of the National Collector's Mint.

== Awards and honors ==
Goldwater has won several awards, including the Achievement Award from the National Academy of Television Arts & Sciences, an award from the President's Commission on Employment of the Handicapped, the Distinguished Service Award of the A.C.A., and the Conscience of the Congress Award of the American Conservative Union.

== Electoral history ==
1969 California's 27th congressional district special election
Party	Candidate	Votes	%
Republican	Barry Goldwater Jr.	64,734	56.9
Democratic	John K. Van de Kamp	48,983	43.1
Total votes		113,717	100.0
Republican hold			

1970 United States House of Representatives elections in California
Party	Candidate	Votes	%
Republican	Barry Goldwater Jr. (Incumbent)	139,326	66.6
Democratic	N. "Toni" Kimmel	63,652	30.5
Peace and Freedom	Edward Richer	3,306	1.6
American Independent	John H. Hind	2,642	1.3
Total votes		208,926	100.0
Republican hold			

1972 United States House of Representatives elections in California
Party	Candidate	Votes	%
Republican	Barry Goldwater Jr. (Incumbent)	117,622	57.4
Democratic	Mark S. Novak	87,295	42.6
Total votes		204,917	100.0
Republican hold			

1974 United States House of Representatives elections in California, 20th district
Party	Candidate	Votes	%
Republican	Barry Goldwater Jr.	96,324	61.2
Democratic	Arline M. Mathews	61,119	38.8
Total votes		157,443	100.0
Republican hold			

1976 United States House of Representatives elections in California, 20th district
Party	Candidate	Votes	%
Republican	Barry Goldwater Jr. (Incumbent)	146,158	67.2
Democratic	Patty Lear Corman	71,193	32.8
Total votes		217,351	100.0
Republican hold			

1978 United States House of Representatives elections in California, 20th district
Party	Candidate	Votes	%
Republican	Barry Goldwater Jr. (Incumbent)	129,714	66.4
Democratic	Pat Lear	65,695	33.6
Total votes		195,409	100.0
Republican hold			

1980 United States House of Representatives elections in California, 20th district
Party	Candidate	Votes	%
Republican	Barry Goldwater Jr. (Incumbent)	199,674	78.8
Democratic	Matt Miller	43,024	17.0
Libertarian	Christopher R. Darwin	10,605	4.2
Total votes		253,303	100.0
Republican hold			

1982 Republican U.S. Senate primary in California
Party	Candidate	Votes	%
Republican	Pete Wilson	851,292	37.54%
Republican	Pete McCloskey	577,267	25.46%
Republican	Barry Goldwater Jr.	408,308	18.01%
Republican	Bob Dornan	181,970	8.03%
Republican	Maureen Reagan	118,326	5.22%
Republican	John G. Schmitz	48,267	2.13%
Republican	Ted Bruinsma	37,762	1.67%
Republican	William Shockley	8,308	0.37%
Republican	Rafael D. Cortes	8,064	0.36%
Republican	John Hickey	7,737	0.34%
Republican	Robert K. Booher	7,546	0.33%
Republican	Edison McDaniels	6,945	0.31%
Republican	William H. Pemberton	5,760	0.25%
Democratic	May Chote (write-in)	15	0.00%
Total votes		2,267,577	100.00%

U.S. House of Representatives
Preceded by Edwin Reinecke	Member of the U.S. House of Representatives from California's 27th congressional district 1969–1975	Succeeded by Alphonzo E. Bell Jr.
Preceded by Carlos Moorhead	Member of the U.S. House of Representatives from California's 20th congressional district 1975–1983	Succeeded by Bill Thomas
U.S. order of precedence (ceremonial)
Preceded by Dave Loebsack as Former U.S. Representative	Order of precedence of the United States as Former U.S. Representative	Succeeded by Gary Condit as Former U.S. Representative
