= Julijana Radivojević =

Serbian writer

Julijana Radivojević née Vijatović (Serbian Cyrillic: Јулијана Радивојевић; January 6, 1798 – 1837) is considered the first Serbian woman journalist. She also wrote poetry.

== Biography ==
Julijana Vijatović was born in 1798, (Note: According to Wurzbach's biographical lexicon, the year of Julijana's birth is February 2, 1794 or 1799.) in Vršac, then part of Habsburg monarchy, where her father was a Serbian officer of the Imperial Austrian Army serving in the Military Frontier, the buffer between the Austrian Empire and the Ottoman Empire. After her parents died, Radivojević went to live with her uncle Aleksandar Nako (her mother's brother) in Vienna where she graduated from college. During the eight years in Vienna, she "almost forgot her mother's tongue", she wrote. In 1821, she moved to Pest and there she met and married Maks Radivojević, a tailor, and became acquainted with Serbian literature and national history.

== Career ==
Radivojević is best known for editing the small almanac Talia, published in Pest in 1829. She was the first woman to work on a literary almanac in the Serbian language. She also published the article "Good advice for Serbian daughters", based on Ebersberg's work "Friendly council for more mature female youth". There are also some manuscripts left with her poems; 14 sheets of paper. In 1832, Radivojević met the Czech writer Jan Kolar, who recorded her biographical data.

The Radivojevićs appeared in Pest in 1828 as subscribers to Avram Brankovic's book on the cosmos. In the list of renumbered Serbian books in 1829, it can be seen that she ordered them in Pančevo, as Mrs. "Julia Radivojević, a Serbian writer". As a buyer of Serbian books, Branković met that "Serbian writer" in 1840 in Pest.

Very little is known about her life and works of literature. According to Milorad Pavić, she died after 1837.

== Monographs ==
- Cveta ili dobarь sovѣt serbskimь ktьrma 1300–2000
- Talia za godinu 1829 od Iuliane Radivoevičь rožd. Viatovičь u Pešti. Vъ Budimѣ pis. kr. vseuč. (1829), 16°, 58 str. 1829
