= Efígie da República =

National personification of Brazil and Portugal

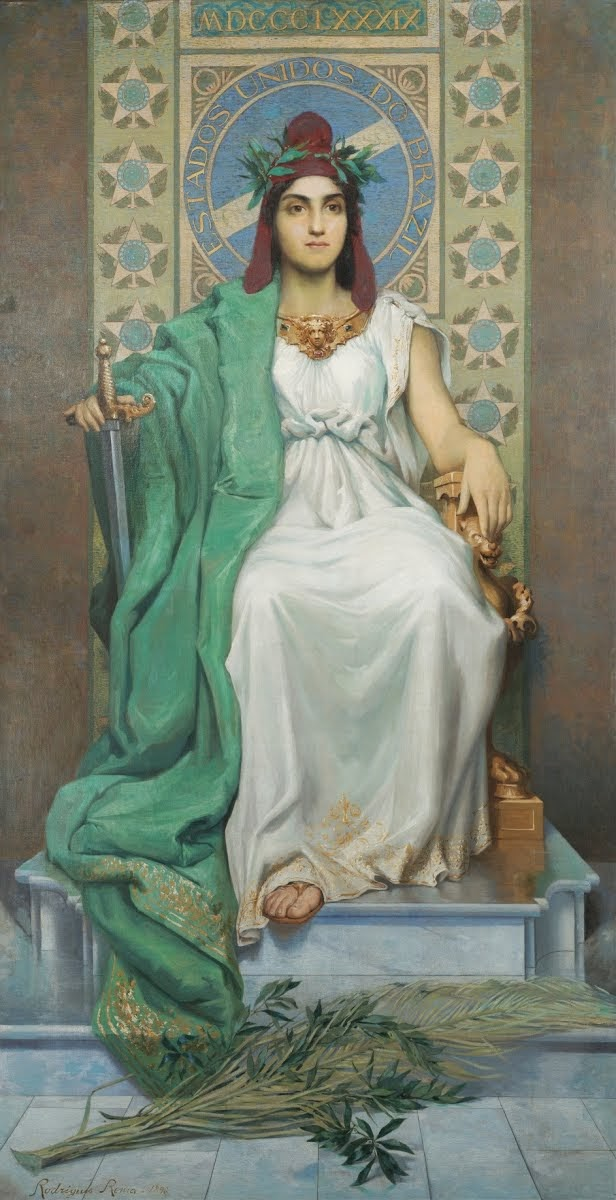
A República, allegoric painting of the Brazilian republic by Manoel Lopes Rodrigues, 1896.

The Efígie da República (Portuguese for Effigy of the Republic) is used as a national personification, both in Brazil and in Portugal, symbolizing the Republic.

== Brazil ==
The effigy is a representation of a young woman wearing a crown of bay leaves in Roman style and a phrygian cap. It is present in allegoric paintings and sculptures displayed in government buildings throughout Brazil, and engraved on Brazilian real coins and banknotes. It was first used as a pro-Republican icon in the 19th century, inspired by France's Marianne. After the proclamation of the Republic in 1889, it became an important symbol of the newly formed Republic.

== Portugal ==
The Portuguese Efígie da República is represented as a young woman wearing the phrygian cap, probably modeled after Marianne, the French personification of Liberty, familiar from Eugène Delacroix' Liberty Leading the People (1830). As a national distinction, the Portuguese Republic is represented wearing green and red clothes.

The Efígie da República was adopted as a Portuguese State official symbol after the 5 October 1910 revolution, when the Republic substituted the Monarchy in Portugal. Before that, it was used as a political symbol by the Portuguese republicans. Later, the sculpture of Simões de Almeida, representing the Busto da República (Bust of the Republic), became the standard for official use. A reproduction of the Bust of the Republic had to be present, in prominence, in all public buildings and was also present, as an effigy, in the escudo coins. It was considered by the new republican regime as a national symbol of Portugal, like the national coat of arms or the national flag.

Although the original intention was for the Efígie da República to become considered as the personification of the own Portuguese Nation, it never gained popularity in that role. Usually it remains seen only as the personification of the republican regimen, and not as a national symbol. While frequently used in the first half of the 20th century, its use today is rare.

== Gallery ==
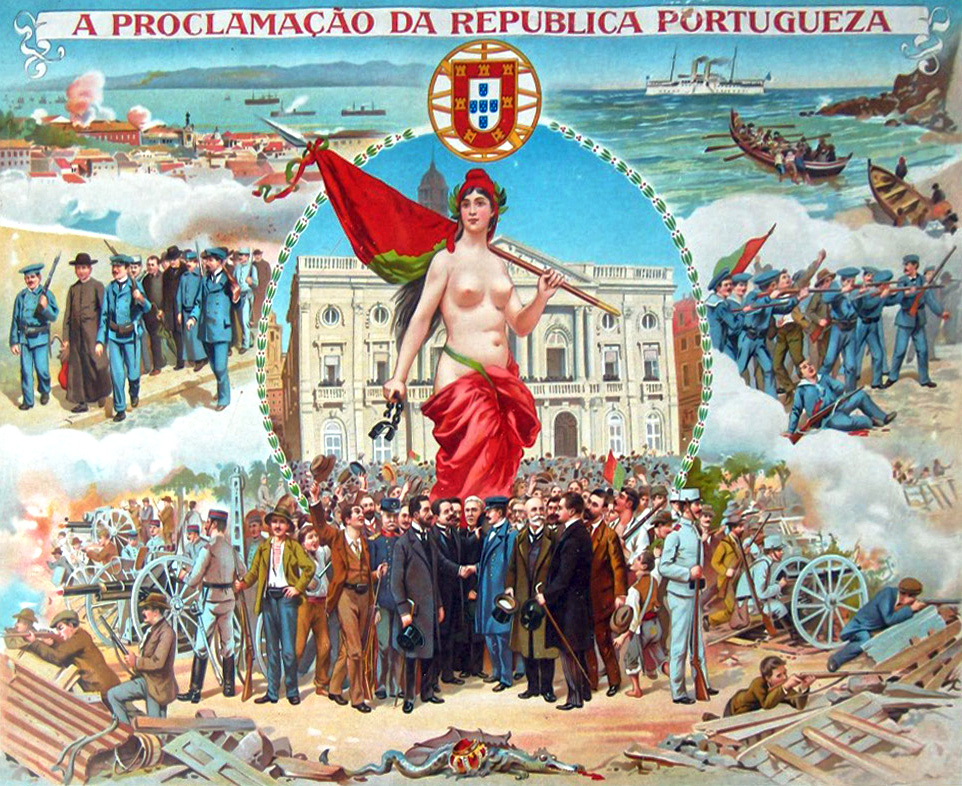
Effigy of the Portuguese Republic, 1910

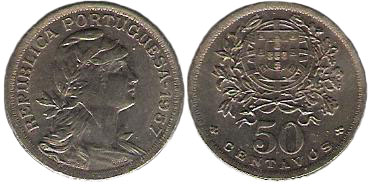
Effigy of the Portuguese Republic on a 50 centavos coin (1912-1968).

The main figures of the Republican faction of the 5 October 1910 revolution.

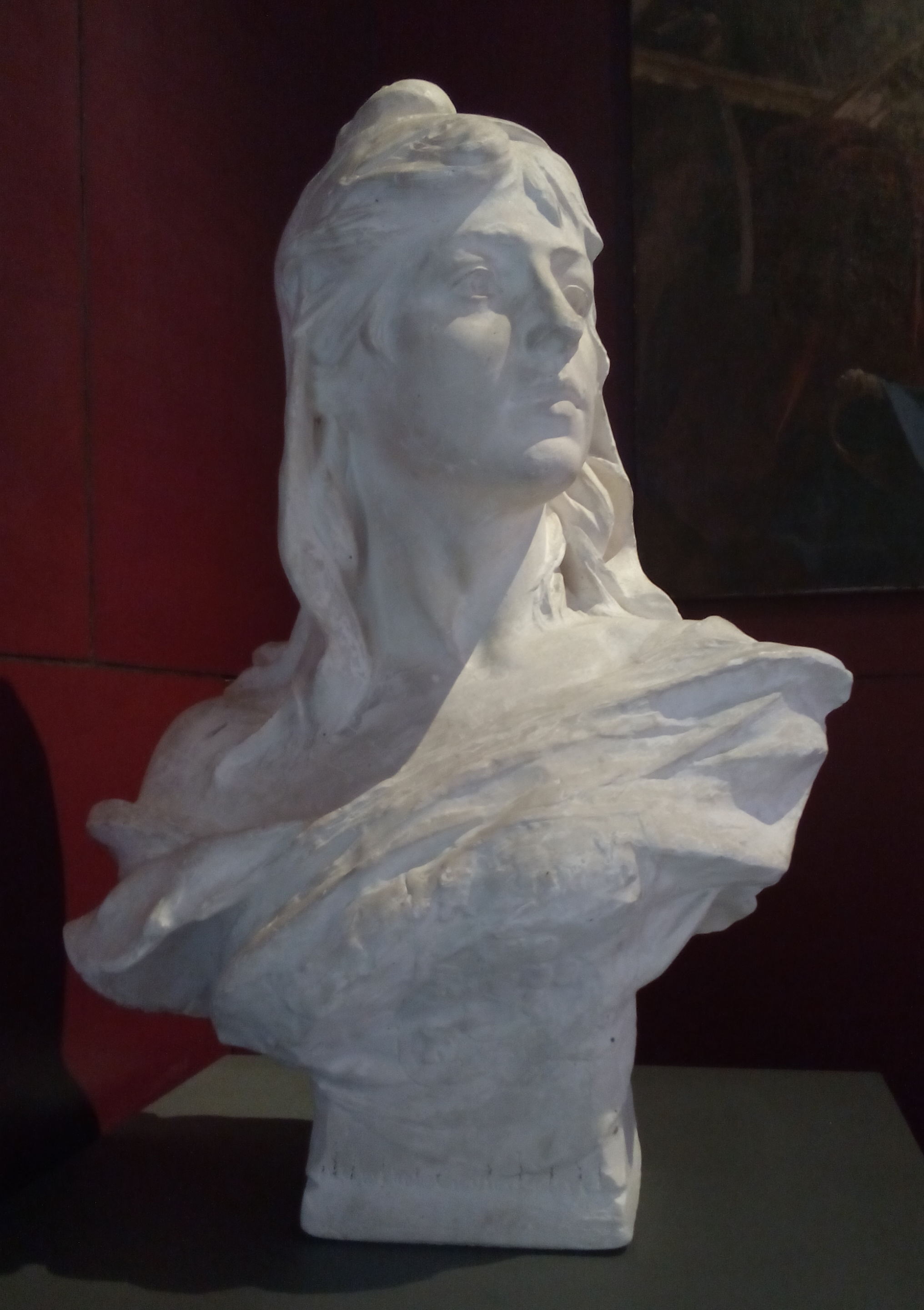
Official Bust of the Portuguese Republic, by José Simões de Almeida, 1908

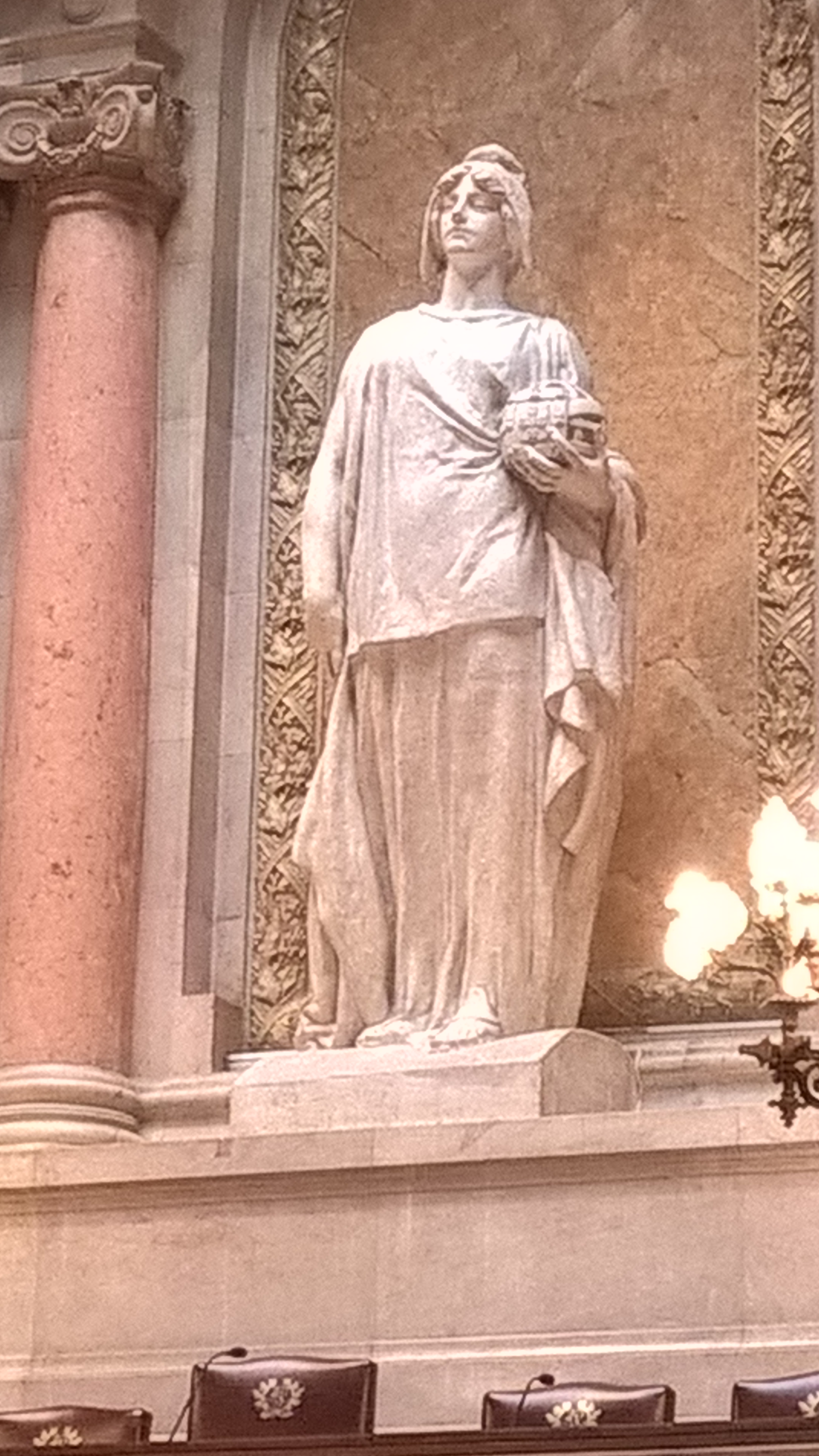
Effigy of the Portuguese Republic in the São Bento Palace, by Anjos Teixiera, 1916

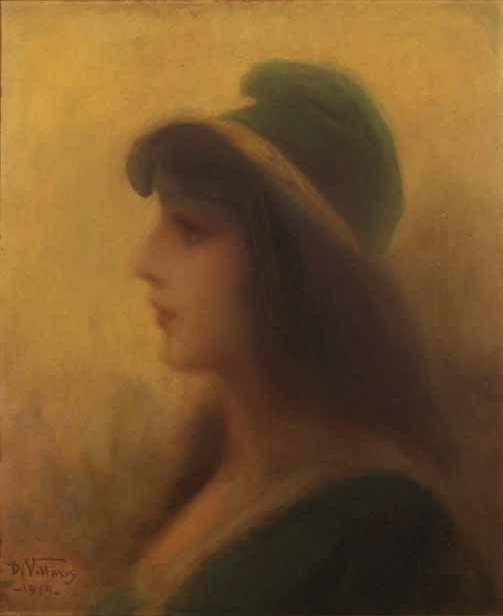
Profile view of the Brazilian republic. Oil on canvas painting by Décio Villares, 1919.

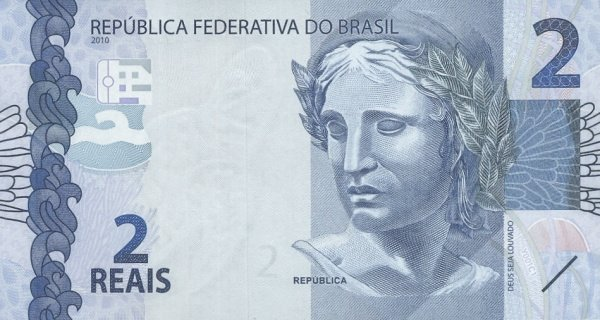
Effigy of the Federative Republic of Brazil on a 2 Reais banknote.

== See also ==
- National personification, a global list of such personifications
- Marianne, a similar representation, for France
