= Avram Alpert =

American academic

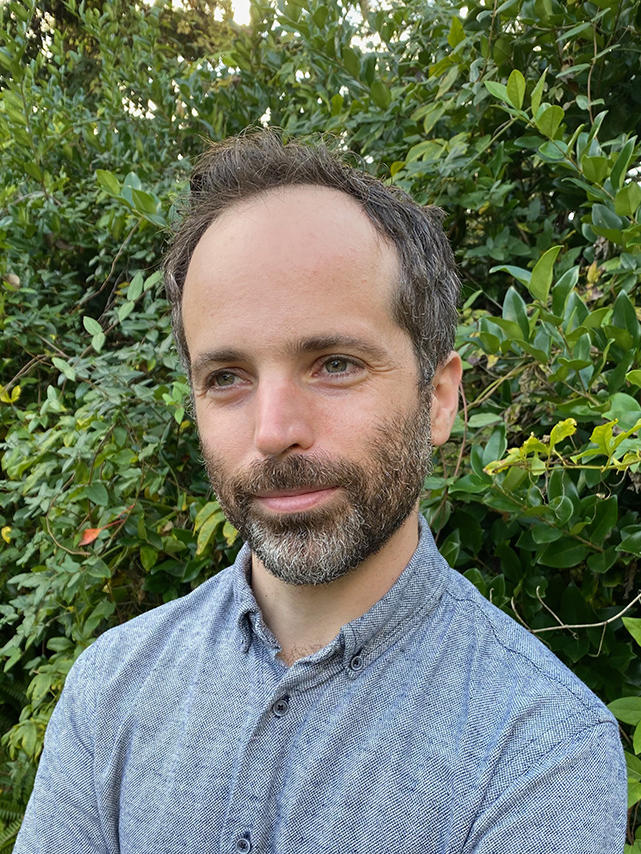

Avram Alpert is an academic and writer who teaches writing and comparative literature at Princeton University and co-directs the Interdisciplinary Art and Theory Program with Meleko Mokgosi and Anthea Behm. He has written three books: Global Origins of the Modern Self, from Montaigne to Suzuki (SUNY Press 2019), A Partial Enlightenment: What Modern Literature and Buddhism Can Teach Us About Living Well without Perfection (Columbia University Press 2021), and The Good-Enough Life (Princeton University Press 2022). Princeton University Press will also publish his fourth book, While We're Here: On Belonging in This World in March 2027. He also writes for newspapers including The New York Times, The Washington Post, and The Guardian, and journals such as Aeon and Dissent.

Alpert received his PhD in Comparative Literature and Literary Theory from the University of Pennsylvania. He has been the recipient of fellowships from the Fulbright Commission, The New Institute, and the Mellon Foundation. He is a fellow of the New York Institute for the Humanities.

== Writings ==
Alpert has written about issues in postcolonial theory, Buddhist modernism, equality, and how to live a good life. His first book, Global Origins of the Modern Self, "argues that modern conceptions of the self are deeply rooted in the responses of a wide range of thinkers to global encounters, especially those between Europeans and the people they colonized.". Alpert writes about European philosophers including Montaigne, Rousseau, Kant, and Hegel, as well as anti colonial writers Frantz Fanon and Leopold Senghor, and the Buddhist writer D.T. Suzuki. Arguing that they all responded equally to the condition of global modernity, he writes that these latter "are not outsiders to the Western tradition clamoring to make their voices heard, but rather part of a single, shared, wildly uneven, and violent history of global self-making." The book received two positive reviews, with one calling it "an original and masterful synthesis of diverse sources and intellectual traditions" and another says it is an "erudite and engaged book" that "shows how fruitful the history of the self from a global perspective can be.". In a symposium about the book hosted by Rutgers University, Senegalese philosopher Souleymane Bachir Diagne said Global Origins was "a great book in its radical approach...totally uprooting a traditional conception in Western philosophy...about what it means to be a self." In so doing, the book "shows what it means to decolonize philosophy" by demonstrating that you can't start with a "deglobalized" Europe and then watch it expand, as philosophers of the self like Charles Taylor do, but must first understand European philosophy as itself produced by global encounters.

His second book, A Partial Enlightenment, is about how novelists incorporated modern Buddhism into their writing. Authors discussed include Rudyard Kipling, Joseph Conrad, Yukio Mishima, Bessie Head, and Jamyang Norbu. The book also incorporates anecdotes about Alpert's own experience with Buddhist philosophy and practice. He explains that he, like many, first thought that modern Buddhism was a perfect system of philosophy and meditation that could lead to an anxiety free existence. But as he learned more about Buddhist life by visiting Tibetans in exile in India and read more in Buddhist studies, he found that this modern vision was largely an invention. Nevertheless, over time, he came to appreciate that modern Buddhism was a powerful way of viewing the world not in spite but because of this--that it taught us something about living in an imperfect world and how to live our lives in light of such imperfection. Ultimately, the book "argues that, in spite of critiques of modernized Buddhism as an Orientalist appropriation, Buddhist-themed world literature can help us to understand what is uniquely valuable about modern Buddhism." It also received two positive reviews, including one in Publishers Weekly. An academic reviewer, Kyle Garton-Gundling, was generally positive, noting the book's "methodological openness of interweaving personal and scholarly reflection is worthy of imitation. He continued "its commitment to opening up the life-nourishing potential of literature is a salutary testament to what draws us to read it in the first place." Nevertheless, he suggested the book had "unresolved tensions" in how it approached the relationship of Buddhism and literature.

The Good-Enough Life was more widely written about and generally widely-praised. In the book, Alpert builds on the work of D.W. Winnicott and his idea of the "good-enough mother" or parent to develop a more general theory about individuals, relationships, politics, and ecology. Winnicott's insight, according to Alpert, is that striving for greatness is bad for both the child and the parent. For the parent, because it is too great a burden, and for the child, because it takes away their ability to creatively adapt to difficulty. Alpert suggests that in general striving to greatness has damaging effects on our psyches as we overburden ourselves and on our societies and we engage in vicious competition with each other. Instead of aiming for greatness, he suggests we should aim, like Winnicott, to be "good enough," meaning being decent, caring, and meaning-driven, while ensuring sufficient resources for all, and while appreciating that nothing will be perfect. Rana Foroohar, writing in the Financial Times, chose it as the best book of 2022. She wrote: "We live in a world in which many people think perfection is both possible, and desirable. Princeton lecturer Avram Alpert argues quite persuasively that it’s just the opposite. Our effort to maximise everything — from work to love to child rearing to health — is making us anxious, narcissistic and horrible to ourselves and others. It’s also making it harder to tackle the world’s biggest problems, from climate change to inequality. A good read to reflect on during the holiday season." The book was also chosen as a Choice Outstanding Academic Title. The reviewer, Randolph Cornelius of Vassar College, called it "an amazing and deeply inspiring book," adding: "There is scarcely a page from which this reader does not wish to quote and share Alpert’s wisdom with others." The New Yorker's Joshua Rothman also wrote a review of the book in which he affirmed Alpert's analysis of the problem with "greatness thinking" while also pointing out why achieving a good-enough life remains difficult. Overall, he commented that the book "contains all sorts of ideas about how we might dislodge greatness from our minds, our relationships, and civilization at large." And in a generally positive review in The Atlantic, staff writer Lily Meyer commented: "His arguments for holding ourselves not to the monolithic standard of greatness but to the seemingly looser metrics of goodness and enoughness are, paradoxical though this may seem, guides toward a more determined way of inhabiting the world." In spite of such praise, Rachel Lu raised doubts about the efficacy and likelihood of Alpert's vision in a negative review in the journal Law & Liberty. Alpert has also spoken at length about the book on CBC (Canada), ABC (Australia), NPR, and as part of a documentary on Arte TV, Germany.
