= Avram C. Freedberg =

American producer (born 1947)

- Born: Avram Chaim Freedberg; June 25, 1947 (age 79); Brooklyn, New York, U.S.
- Spouse: Rhoda Freedberg
- Children: Jonathan Freedberg; Arielle Freedberg

Avram Chaim Freedberg (born June 25, 1947) is a Broadway theatre producer, a direct marketer, and founder of National Collector's Mint. He founded Maximum Entertainment Productions LLC and has produced and invested in a number of Broadway shows. He is also a thoroughbred racehorse owner.

== Broadway ==
Freedberg's Broadway credits include Dr. Seuss’ How the Grinch Stole Christmas, The Addams Family and Carrie Fisher’s Wishful Drinking. One of his off-Broadway shows, Los Big Names, earned Outer Critic's Circle and Drama Desk nominations.

In 2006 and 2007 Freedberg's company Maximum Entertainment was the producer for Dr. Seuss' How the Grinch Stole Christmas! during the Christmas season. The 2007 production was halted for seven days during the 2007 Broadway stagehand strike and managed to get back into performance by getting a special dispensation.

== Obscenity charges ==
In 1988 he operated Consumer Marketing Group in Stamford, Connecticut, and Dirty Dick's Dynamite Discount Den as a distributor of pornographic materials. After being tried for obscenity charges, Freedberg accepted a plea bargain to pay $600,000 and promise to never deal in sexually explicit materials again. A United States District Judge ruled that he could not be prosecuted in two states simultaneously on obscenity charges.

=== National Collectors Mint ===
In 1991 he founded the National Collectors Mint in Port Chester, New York. The company, through its online catalog and television advertisements, markets collectible and commemorative coins. In 2004, it began selling coins commemorating the September 11 attacks with silver purported to have been recovered from the World Trade Center. The coins, which it allegedly purported to be legal tender, are said to have been issued by the United States territory Commonwealth of the Northern Mariana Islands which cannot issue legal tender. After the company paid a $750,000 settlement to the FTC for repeatedly and fraudulently marketing the coins, senator Chuck Schumer stated, "This settlement will assure consumers that we, as a nation, will not tolerate such a despicable scam."
