= Karlovica =

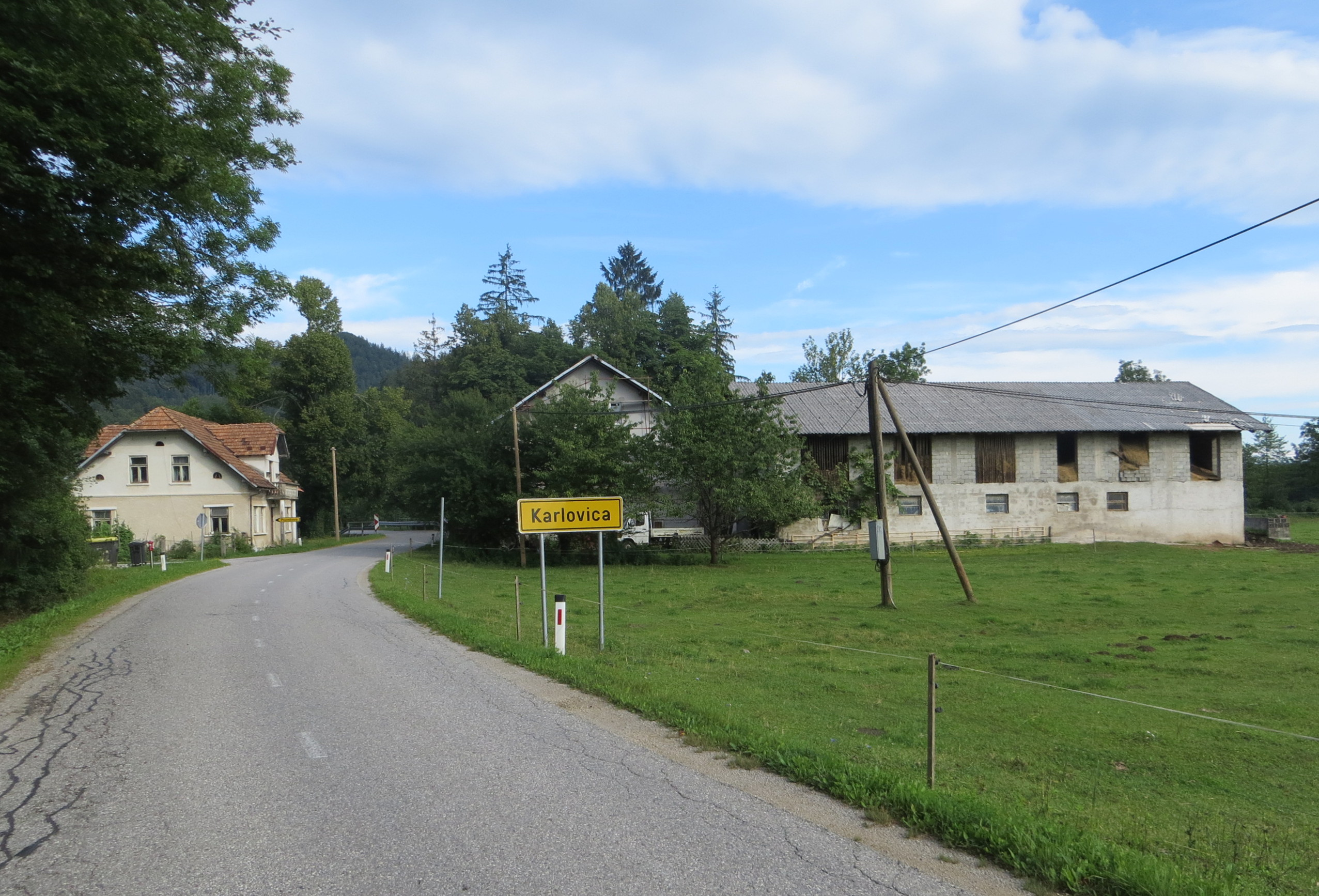

- Location in Slovenia
- Coordinates: 45°48′25.64″N 14°36′14.29″E
- Country: Slovenia
- Traditional region: Lower Carniola
- Statistical region: Central Slovenia
- Municipality: Velike Lašče

Area
  - Total: 0.46 km^{2} (0.18 sq mi)
- Elevation: 539.2 m (1,769 ft)

Population (2002)
  - Total: 48
- Postal code: 1315

Karlovica (pronounced [ˈkaːɾlɔʋitsa]; German: Karlowitz) is a settlement southwest of Velike Lašče in central Slovenia. The Velike Lašče area is part of the traditional region of Lower Carniola and is included in the Central Slovenia Statistical Region.
