= Ivica Avramović =

Serbian footballer

Personal information
- Full name: Ivica Avramović
- Date of birth: 30 August 1976 (age 50)
- Place of birth: Belgrade, SFR Yugoslavia
- Height: 1.82 m (6 ft 0 in)
- Position: Midfielder

Youth career
- –1995: Partizan

Senior career*
Years	Team	Apps	(Gls)
1995–2000	Hamburger SV II	18	(1)
1997–1998	→ Železnik (loan)	3	(0)
2000–2001	Las Palmas	0	(0)
2001–2002	Sutjeska Nikšić	7	(0)
2002–2003	Mladenovac	18	(10)
2003–2004	Borac Čačak	14	(0)
2005–2008	Mladenovac	89	(21)
Total		149	(32)
- * Club domestic league appearances and goals

Ivica Avramović (Serbian Cyrillic: Ивица Аврамовић; born 30 August 1976) is a Serbian former footballer who played as a midfielder.
