= Brusnica, Slovakia =

Brusnica
- Municipality
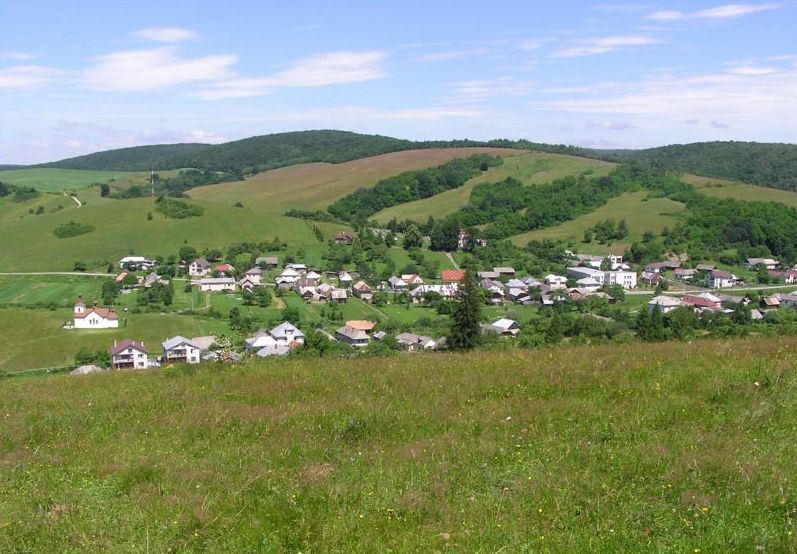

- Flag

- Location of Brusnica in the Prešov Region Location of Brusnica in Slovakia
- Coordinates: 49.15°N 21.70°E
- Country: Slovakia
- Region: Prešov Region
- District: Stropkov District
- First mentioned: 1408

Area
  - Total: 14.28 km^{2} (5.51 sq mi)
- Elevation: 191 m (627 ft)

Population (2025)
  - Total: 292
- Time zone: UTC+1 (CET)
  - Summer (DST): UTC+2 (CEST)
- Postal code: 903 1
- Area code: +421 54
- Vehicle registration plate (until 2022): SP
- Website: brusnica.sk

Brusnica (Rusyn: Брусніця; Hungarian: Borosnya) is a village and municipality in Stropkov District in the Prešov Region of north-eastern Slovakia.

== History ==
In historical records the village was first mentioned in 1408.

== Geography ==
The municipality lies at an altitude of 191 metres (627 ft) and covers an area of 14.28 km^{2} (5.51 sq mi) (2025). The village has a significant Rusyn minority (32%) and smaller Romani minority (2%), along with the majority of Slovaks (65%).

== Population ==
Population statistic (10 years)
Year	1995	2005	2015	2025
Count	317	431	410	292
Difference		+35.96%	−4.87%	−28.78%

Population statistic
Year	2024	2025
Count	293	292
Difference		−0.34%

It has a population of 292 people (31 December 2025).

=== Ethnicity ===
Census 2021 (1+ %)
Ethnicity	Number	Fraction
Slovak	235	76.29%
Rusyn	121	39.28%
Not found out	17	5.51%
Romani	14	4.54%
Total	308	

In year 2021 was 308 people by ethnicity 235 as Slovak, 121 as Rusyn, 17 as Not found out, 14 as Romani, 3 as Ukrainian and 1 as Czech.

Note on population: The difference values of population numbers in the table "Population statistic" and in the sections "Ethnicity" & "Religion" is caused by the use of various statistical methods.

=== Religion ===
Census 2021 (1+ %)
Religion	Number	Fraction
Greek Catholic Church	130	42.21%
Eastern Orthodox Church	120	38.96%
Roman Catholic Church	26	8.44%
None	19	6.17%
Not found out	12	3.9%
Total	308	

In year 2021 was 308 people by religion 130 from Greek Catholic Church, 120 from Eastern Orthodox Church, 26 from Roman Catholic Church, 19 from None, 12 from Not found out and 1 from Buddhism.

== Genealogical resources ==
The records for genealogical research are available at the state archive "Statny Archiv in Presov, Slovakia"

- Roman Catholic church records (births/marriages/deaths): 1700-1897 (parish B)
- Greek Catholic church records (births/marriages/deaths): 1831-1946 (parish A)

== See also ==
- List of municipalities and towns in Slovakia
