= Avram Moiseevich Razgon =

Russian historian and professor (1920–1989)

Avram Moiseevich Razgon (Russian: Аврам Моисе́евич Разго́н́; 6 January 1920, Yartsevo – 3 February 1989, Moscow) was a Russian historian and a prominent Soviet theoretician of museology. He received a Doctor of Sciences in 1974, and became a university professor in 1989.

== Career ==
Razgon graduated from Lomonosov University in 1948. He was a student and later an associate of N. Rubinstein, a renowned Soviet historian and specialist in the historiography of Russian history.

He worked as a Senior scientific officer (1952–1962) and later as the deputy director for Science (1962–1972) in the Research Institute for Museum Studies in Moscow.

Razgon was the head of the Museum Studies sector at the Museum of Revolution from 1972 to 1974. He headed the Department of cartography of the State Historical Museum, Moscow, from 1974 to 1988. In 1984, he founded the Department of Museum Studies at the All-Union Institute of improvement of professional skills of workers of art and culture, and was the head of the department until 1989. He was also lecturing on Museology in the Faculty of History at Lomonosov University and in the Department of Museum Studies of the Moscow State Historico-Archival Institute. In the USSR, he was the first academic to attain the rank of Professor in the Department of Museum Studies (1986).

Razgon was one of the founders of ICOM’s International Committee for museology (ICOFOM) and from 1977 to 1983 was ICOFOM’s Vice President. He participated in the creation of the international Glossary of museum terms Dictionarium museologicum published in 1983 and 1986.

Together with museologists from the GDR, Razgon led an international project to write the book “Museum Studies: Historical museums” which was published in 1988 and which was, for many years, the main textbook on museology. In the last decades of his life, Razgon put a lot of energy into the development of the theoretical and methodological foundations of the education of professional museologists.

The State Historical Museum and other heritage institutions have organized a number of conferences to commemorate his work and ideas for the purpose of the further development of museum theory and practice.

== Research interests ==
Razgon authored over 100 scientific papers on economic history and museology. His research was based on both printed and archival sources as well as on objects from museum collections, and his writings were devoted to the history of historical, archaeological, military and local lore museums and to the protection of monuments of history and culture in the context of the history of society and development of scientific knowledge. Summarizing these observations, his doctoral dissertation "Historical museums in Russia in 1861-1917" (1973) became an important work in the historiography of Russian museology. He directed the preparation of collective writings on the history of museum work entitled: “Essays on the History of museums in Russia and the USSR” (1960–1971) and were among those Razgon published about the state of historical museums and monuments from the 18th century to the year 1917.

Since the mid1970s, Razgon's scientific interests lay mainly in the field of history and the theory of museum work. Razgon considered that museology was showing “features of an independent scientific branch” that was studying the processes of the preservation of social information, a knowledge of the world and the transfer of knowledge and emotion through museum objects. Razgon was promoting the idea of “museum sources studies”, i.e. museum objects analyzed as a source of information. He was also interested in determining the place of museology in relation to other sciences and fields of knowledge and in the improvement of museological terminology.

Razgon's idea of “museum sources studies” as a separate area of knowledge was later developed in the writings of Nina P. Finyagina (1930–2000) and Natalia G. Samarina (1958–2011). From their point of view, the main difference between the “museum sources studies” and “historical source studies” lay in the emphasis on semantic information that a museum object carries.

== Works ==
- Finjagina N. P., Razgon A.M. Izučenie i naučnoe opisanie pamjatnikov material’noj kul’tury. Moskva : Sovetskaja Rossija, 1972, 271 p.
- Razgon A.M. Research work in museums: its possibilities and limits, in Possibilities and Limits in Scientific Research Typical for the Museums. (Les possibilités et les limites du travail et de la recherche scientifiques dans les muses, in Possibilités et limites de la recherche scientifique typiques pour les musées). Brno, Musée morave, 1978, p. 20–45, 99–127.
- Razgon A.M. Contemporary museology and the problem, in Sociological and Ecological Aspects in Modern Museum Activities in the Light of Cooperation With Other Related Institutions. (La muséologie contemporaine et le problème de la place des musées dans le système des institutions sociales, in Aspects sociologiques et écologiques dans l’activité des musées modernes en coopération avec les autres organisations sœurs). Brno, Moravian Museum, 1979, p. 29–37.
- Razgon A.M. Museological provocations 1979, in Museology – Science or just practical museum work? MuWoP 1, 1980, p. 11–12.
- Razgon A.M. Multidisciplinary research in museology. MuWoP 2, 1981, p. 51–53.

== Works about Razgon ==
- Slovo o soratnike i druge. Moskva : Gosudarstvennyj Istoričeskij Muzej, 1999, 152 p.
