= Non-circulating legal tender =

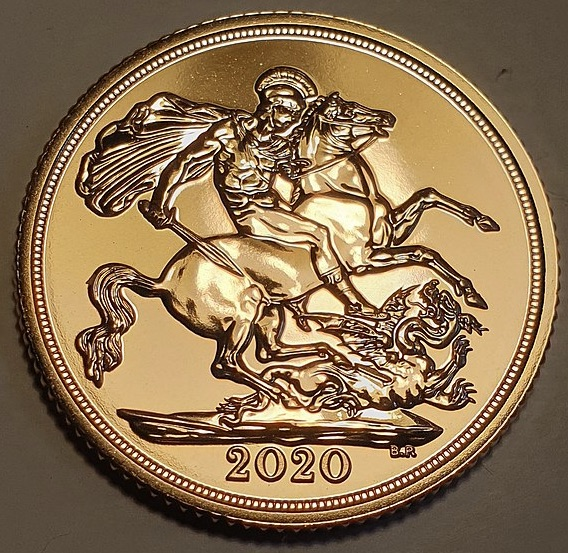
A gold British sovereign minted in 2020. While the sovereign has a face value of 1 pound sterling, its worth in metal and numismatic value is substantially higher, making its use as legal tender highly inadvisable.

Non-circulating legal tender (NCLT) refers to coins that are theoretically legal tender and could circulate but do not because their issue price, and/or their melt value at the time of issue is significantly above the arbitrary legal tender value placed thereon. They are sold to collectors and investors with no intention that they be used as money. Notable examples would include commemoratives, proofs, bullion coins, presentation sets, patterns and the like.

Some coins intended as NCLT have historically circulated, such as the 1893 World's Columbian Exposition half dollar, which was a commemorative, and the 1856 Flying Eagle cent, which was a pattern.

Private issues are not NCLT because they are not legal tender and are properly viewed as medals.
