= Brazilian real (old) =

Former currency of Brazil

Brazilian real (1747–1942)
- A 2 mil réis banknote from 1923, featuring the bust of Prudente de Morais on the obverse

Units of account
- Base unit: real
- Plural: réis
- Symbol: Rs$
- Superunit
- 1,000,000: conto de réis
- 1,000: mil réis

Denominations
- Banknotes
- Freq. used: Rs 500, Rs 1$000, Rs 2$000, Rs 5$000, Rs 10$000, Rs 20$000, Rs 30$000, Rs 50$000, Rs 100$000, Rs 200$000, Rs 500$000
- Rarely used: Rs 1:000$000 (conto de réis)
- Coins
- Freq. used: Rs 20, Rs 50, Rs 100, Rs 200, Rs 400, Rs 1$000, Rs 2$000
- Rarely used: Rs 40, Rs 80, Rs 300, Rs 320, Rs 960

Demographics
- Replaced: Portuguese real
- Date of withdrawal: 1 November 1942
- Replaced by: Cruzeiro (1st iteration)
- User(s): Kingdom of Brazil; Empire of Brazil; Brazil (First Brazilian Republic, Second Republic, and Estado Novo)

Issuance
- Central bank: Tesouro Nacional
- Printer: American Bank Note Company
- Mint: Casa da Moeda do Brasil

Valuation
- Inflation: 1.5% (1880); 41% (1890); 13% (1900); 6% (1930)
- Source: Consumer price index
- This infobox shows the latest status before this currency was rendered obsolete.

The first official currency of Brazil was the real (pronounced [ʁeˈaw]; pl. réis), with the symbol Rs$. As the currency of the Portuguese empire, it was in use in Brazil from the earliest days of the colonial period, and remained in use until 1942, when it was replaced by the cruzeiro.

The name "real" was resurrected in 1994 for the new currency unit (but with the new plural form "reais"). This currency is still in use. One modern real is equivalent to 2.75 × 10^{18} (2.75 quintillion) of the old réis.

The name comes from the Portuguese word real (in the sense of "royal" or "regal") and was borrowed from a Portuguese currency previously used in Brazil.

The dollar-like sign in the currency's symbol (and in the symbols of all other Brazilian currencies), called cifrão in Portuguese, was always written with two vertical strokes rather than one.

== History ==
The Portuguese real was the currency used by the first Portuguese settlers to arrive in the Americas, but the first official money to circulate bearing the name real was actually printed in 1645 by the Dutch, during their occupation of part of the Brazilian Northeast (1624-1654).

Until 1747 the Brazilian real was the same as the Portuguese real, with the gold peça of 13.145 g fine gold worth 6,400 réis or 6400. After that date, however, the Brazilian real started to become a separate currency unit when the value of the peça was raised by 10% in Brazil (but not in Portugal) to 7,040 réis. The values of both units diverged further in the 19th century, with the peça becoming 8,000 Portuguese réis in 1837 versus 16,000 Brazilian réis in 1846.

The real was retained when Brazil became independent in 1822. It was not sub-divided in smaller units, and was affected by significant inflation during its long lifespan. The practical currency unit shifted from the real to the mil réis ('one thousand réis') and then to the conto de réis (one million réis, literally 'one count of réis') in the final years of the First Brazilian Republic.

Amounts under 1,000 réis were typically written prefixed by "Rs", as in "Rs 350". In amounts of 1,000 réis and over, the "Rs" remained as the prefix, but the cifrão,, a doubly stroked dollar sign, was inserted just after the thousands digit — as in "Rs 1712" for 1,712 réis. For amounts of one million reais and over, a colon ":" was also inserted just after the millions digit, as in "Rs 1:020800" for 1,020,800 réis.

In the 18th century and early 19th centuries, the gold currency was based on the 22 karat gold peça which weighed 1/2 ounce (14.34 grams). The standard for the silver currency varied during this period, with the 640 real coin fixed at 5/8 onça (17.92 grams) of .917 silver in 1806. In 1834, the peça was revalued at 10000 réis and the silver 1200 real coin was set at 415 grains (26.89 grams) of .917 silver. In 1846, a gold standard was established with the mil réis set at 822.076 mg gold, a 37.5% debasement from the previous standard.

After the establishment of the Republic in 1889, the value of the currency fell, with a peg of 180 mg of gold for the one thousand réis set in 1926. This was abandoned in 1933 when the mil réis was pegged to the U.S. dollar at a rate of 12500 réis = 1 dollar. A further devaluation occurred in 1939, when it was pegged to the U.S. dollar at a rate of 22500 réis = US$1. In 1942, the real was replaced by the cruzeiro, at a rate of 1000 réis = 1 cruzeiro.

== Coins ==
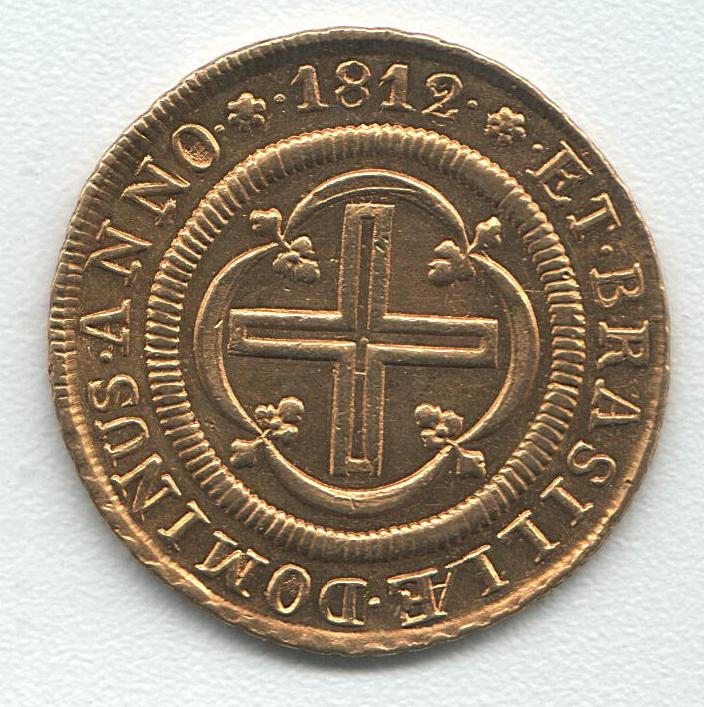
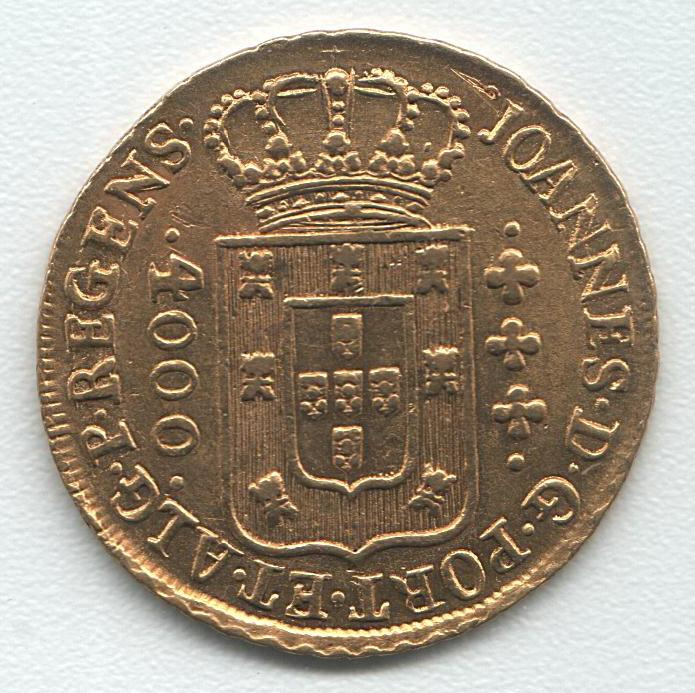
4,000 réis coin from 1812
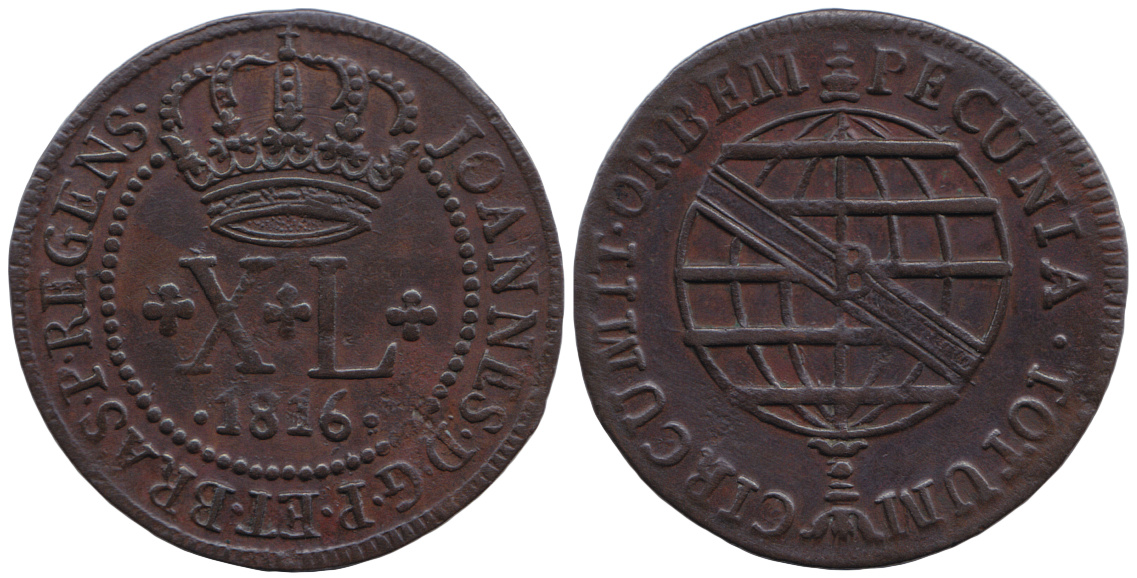
40 (XL) réis coin from 1816. Copper.
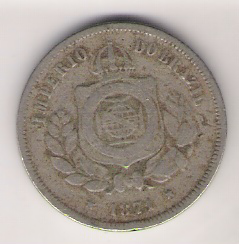
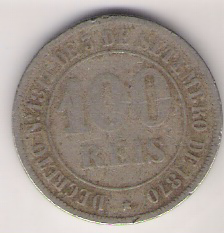
100 réis coin from 1871

In the 1750s, copper coins were in circulation in denominations of 5, 10, 20 and 40 réis, silver coins for 75, 150, 300 and 600 réis, and gold coins for 1,000, 2,000, 4,000 and 6,400 réis. The silver coinage was reformed in 1778, with the introduction of 80, 160, 320 and 640 real coins. Between 1780 and 1782, gold 800, 1,600 and 3,200 réis were added. In 1809, older copper and silver coins were counterstamped with the Portuguese arms, doubling the value of 5, 10, 20 and 40 real pieces and increasing the value of 75, 150, 300 and 600 real coins to 80, 160, 320 and 640 réis. From 1810, Spanish 8 real coins ("Spanish dollars") were overstruck to produce 960 real coins. Copper 80 réis were introduced in 1811.

Between 1823 and 1833, the copper coinage of Brazil varied across the country, with denominations of 10, 20, 37 1/2, 40, 75 and 80 réis being produced. Silver coins continued in denominations of 80, 160, 320, 640 and 960 réis, along with gold 4,000 and 6,400 réis.

Between 1833 and 1835, the coinage was reformed. The copper coinage was standardized across the country, with the introduction of countermarked coins for 10, 20 and 40 réis. Silver coins were introduced in denominations of 100, 200, 400, 800 and 1,200 réis, along with gold 10,000 réis.

A further reform between 1848 and 1854 reduced the silver and gold content of the coinage, with new silver coins for 200, 500, 1,000 and 2,000 réis, and gold 5,000, 10,000 and 20,000 réis. Bronze 10 and 20 réis were introduced in 1868, followed by cupro-nickel 100 and 200 réis in 1871, bronze 40 réis in 1873 and cupro-nickel 50 réis in 1886. The 10 réis was discontinued in 1870.

In 1901, cupro-nickel 400 réis were introduced, followed by cupro-nickel 20 réis in 1918. Aluminium-bronze 500 and 1000 réis were introduced in 1922, followed by cupro-nickel 200 réis, aluminium-bronze 2,000 réis and silver 5,000 réis in 1936.

== Banknotes ==
The earliest Brazilian paper money was issued between 1770 and 1793 by the Administração Geral dos Diamantes (General Diamond Administration) to pay diamond prospectors. Various denominations were issued with the value written on at the time of issue. They circulated at face value and were convertible into coins. Notes were issued by various provinces between 1808 and 1857, in denominations of 37 1/2, 75, 150, 300, 450, 500, 600, 10,000, 25,000, 50,000 and 100,000 réis.

The first Banco do Brazil was founded in 1808 and began issuing notes in 1810, in denominations of 30, 40, 50, 60, 70, 80, 90, 100, 200, 300 and 400 mil réis, with 4, 6, 8, 10, 12 and 20 mil réis added in 1813 and 1 and 2 mil réis in 1828. This bank closed in 1829.

In 1833, the government issued copper exchange notes in denominations of 1, 2, 5, 10, 20, 50 and 100 mil réis. These were followed, in 1835, by Treasury notes in denominations of 1, 2, 5, 10, 20, 50, 100, 200 and 500 mil réis. 500 mil réis notes were added in 1874, with 1,000 mil réis introduced in 1921. Treasury notes continued to be produced throughout the remaining period the real circulated and the final issues were overstamped to produce the first cruzeiro notes.

Between 1850 and 1893, a number of private banks issued paper money in denominations between 10 and 500 mil réis. They included a later Banco do Brazil (1853–1890), the Banco do Maranhão (1857–1885) and the Banco da República dos Estados Unidos do Brasil (1890–1892).

Regional governments issued paper money between 1892 and 1897. Denominations included 100, 200 and 500 réis and 1, 2, 5, 10, 50, 100, 200 and 500 mil réis, with issues from Alagoas, Amazonas, Maranhão, Pernambuco, Rio Grande do Norte and Sergipe.

Between 1906 and 1910, the Caixa de Conversão issued notes in denominations of 10, 20, 50, 100, 200, 500 and 1,000 mil réis (1 conto de réis). In 1905, another Banco do Brazil was founded, which issued paper money between 1923 and 1942 in denominations of 1, 2, 5, 10, 20, 50, 100, 200, 500 and 1,000 mil réis. From 1923, the name of the bank was altered to Banco do Brasil. In 1926, the Caixa de Estabilização issued gold notes in denominations of 10, 20, 50, 100, 200, 500 and 1,000 mil réis.

Regional governments again issued paper money between 1924 and 1942. Denominations included 2, 5, 10, 20, 50, 100, 200 and 500 mil réis, with issues from Minas Gerais, Rio Grande do Sul and São Paulo. The last "réis" banknotes were replaced by cruzeiro banknotes and withdrawn in 1955.

Selection of Réis banknotes

10 mil réis (10$000) banknote from 1833.

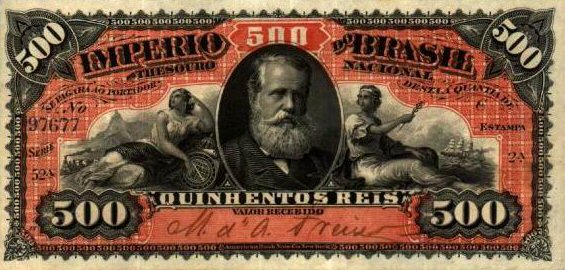
500 réis banknote from 1880, during the imperial period, with Emperor Pedro II's effigy.

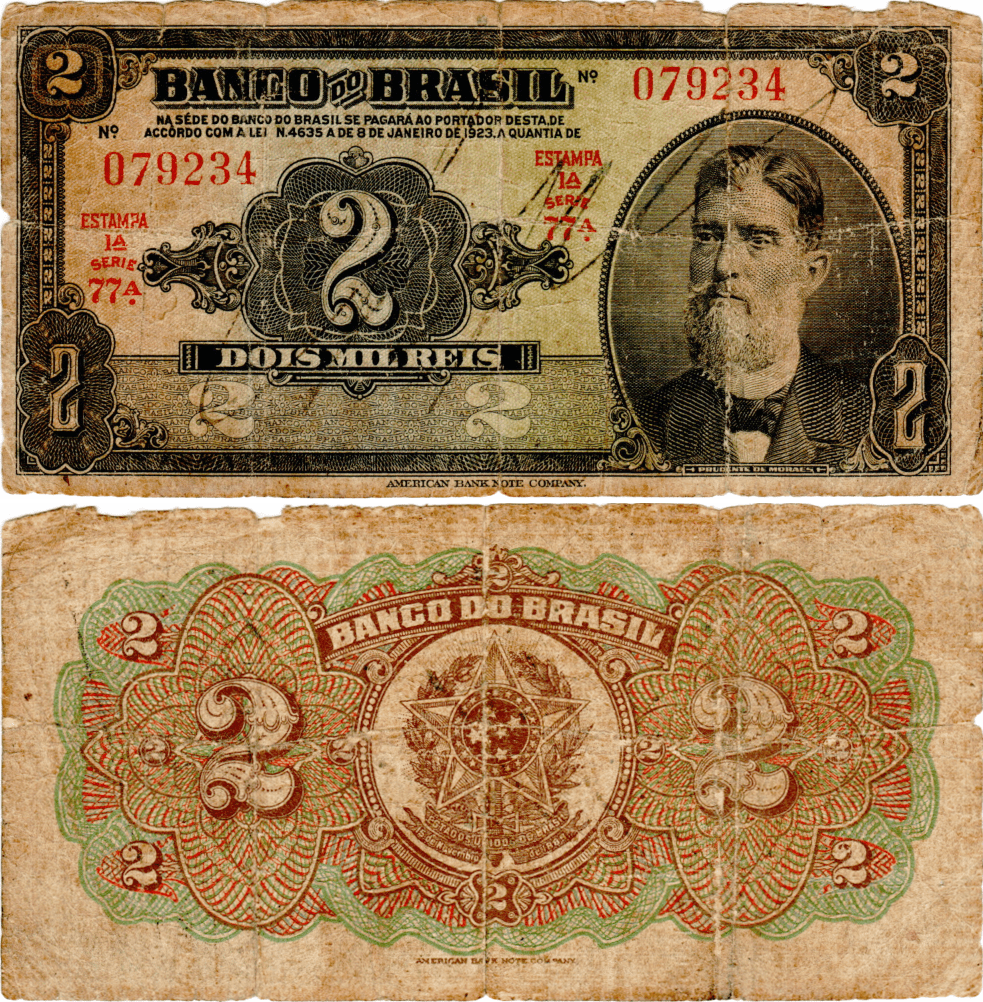
2 mil réis banknote (2$000) from 1923 featuring Prudente de Morais's effigy

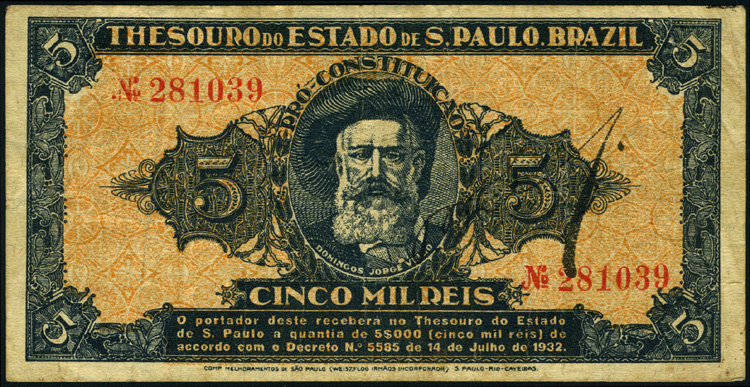
5 mil réis (5$000) banknote issued by the Treasury of the State of São Paulo due to monetary shortage during the 1932 Constitutionalist Revolution.

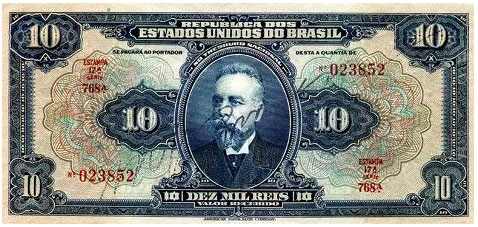
10 mil réis banknote (10$000) from 1925 with President Campos Sales's effigy.

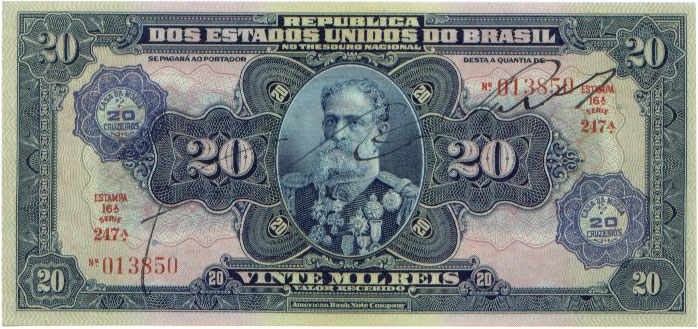
20 mil réis banknote (20$000) from 1925 with Marshal Deodoro da Fonseca's effigy.

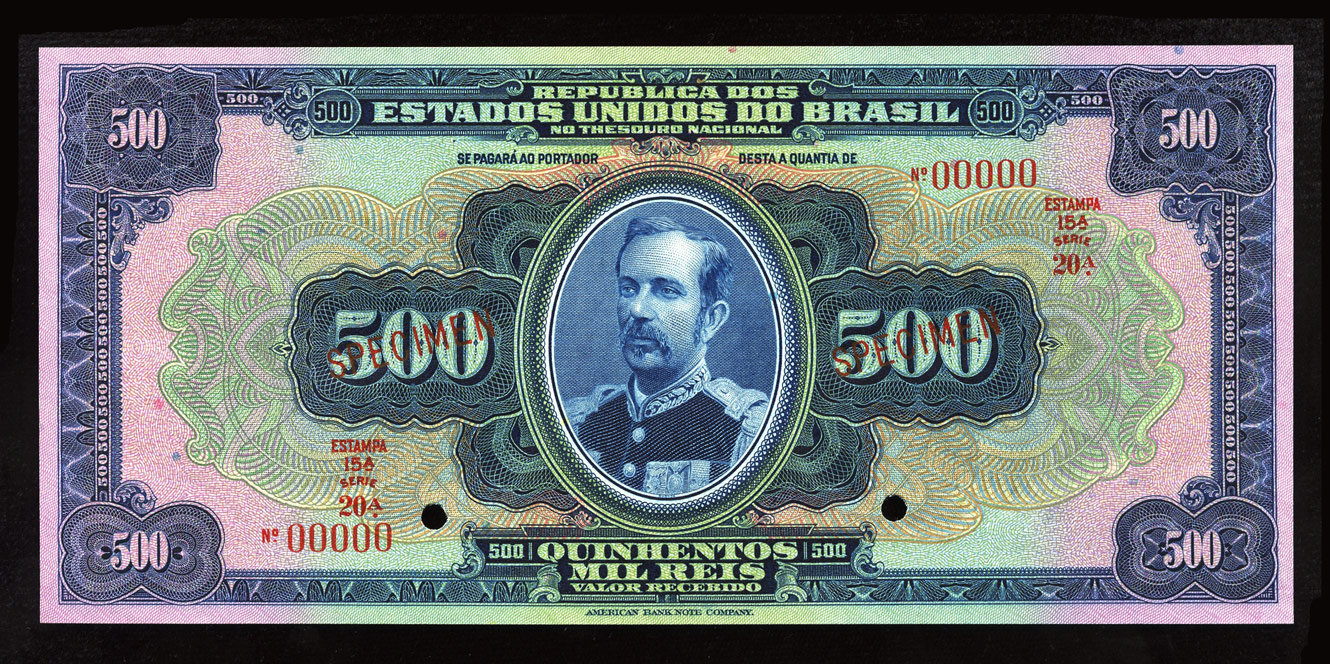
500 mil réis banknote (500$000) from 1931 with Marshal Floriano Peixoto's effigy.

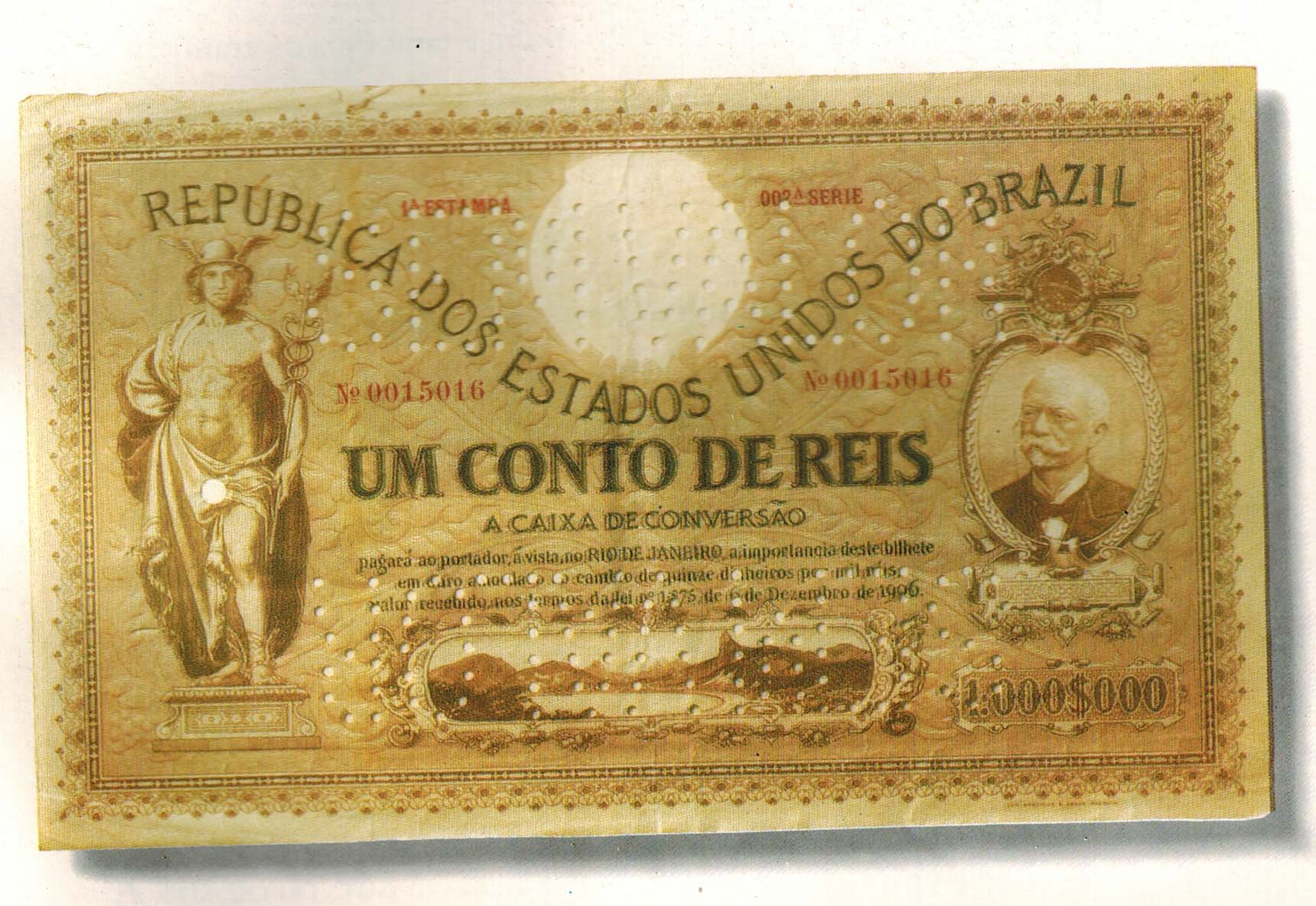
1 million réis – or 1 conto de réis – banknote (1:000$000) from 1907 issued by the Caixa de Conversão.

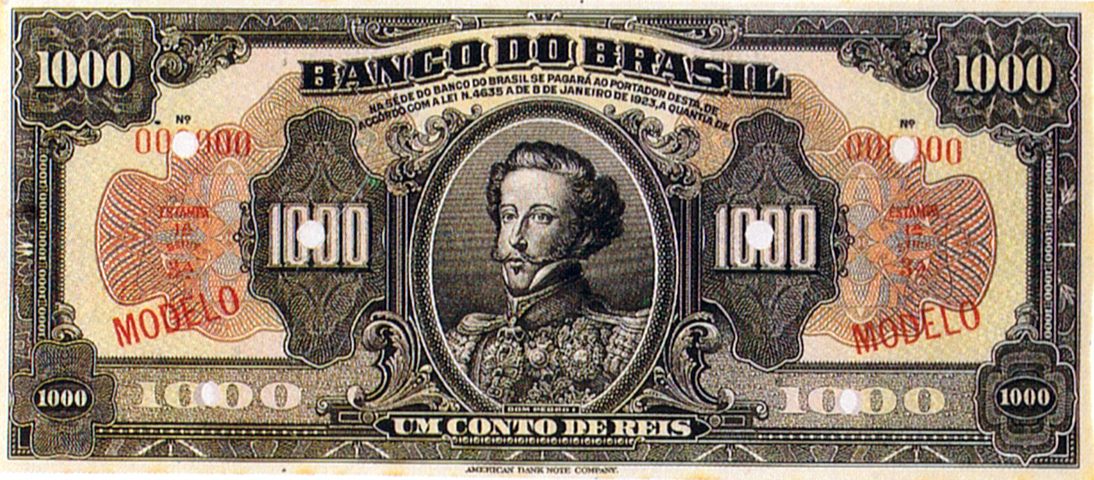
1 million réis banknote from 1923 with Emperor Pedro I's effigy.

== See also ==
- Economy of the Empire of Brazil
- Brazilian currency

Brazilian real (1st iteration)
Preceded by: Portuguese real	Currency of Brazil; 1747 – 1 November 1942	Succeeded by: Cruzeiro (1st iteration); Reason: inflation Ratio: Rs 1$000 = Cr$1
