= Economy of the Empire of Brazil =

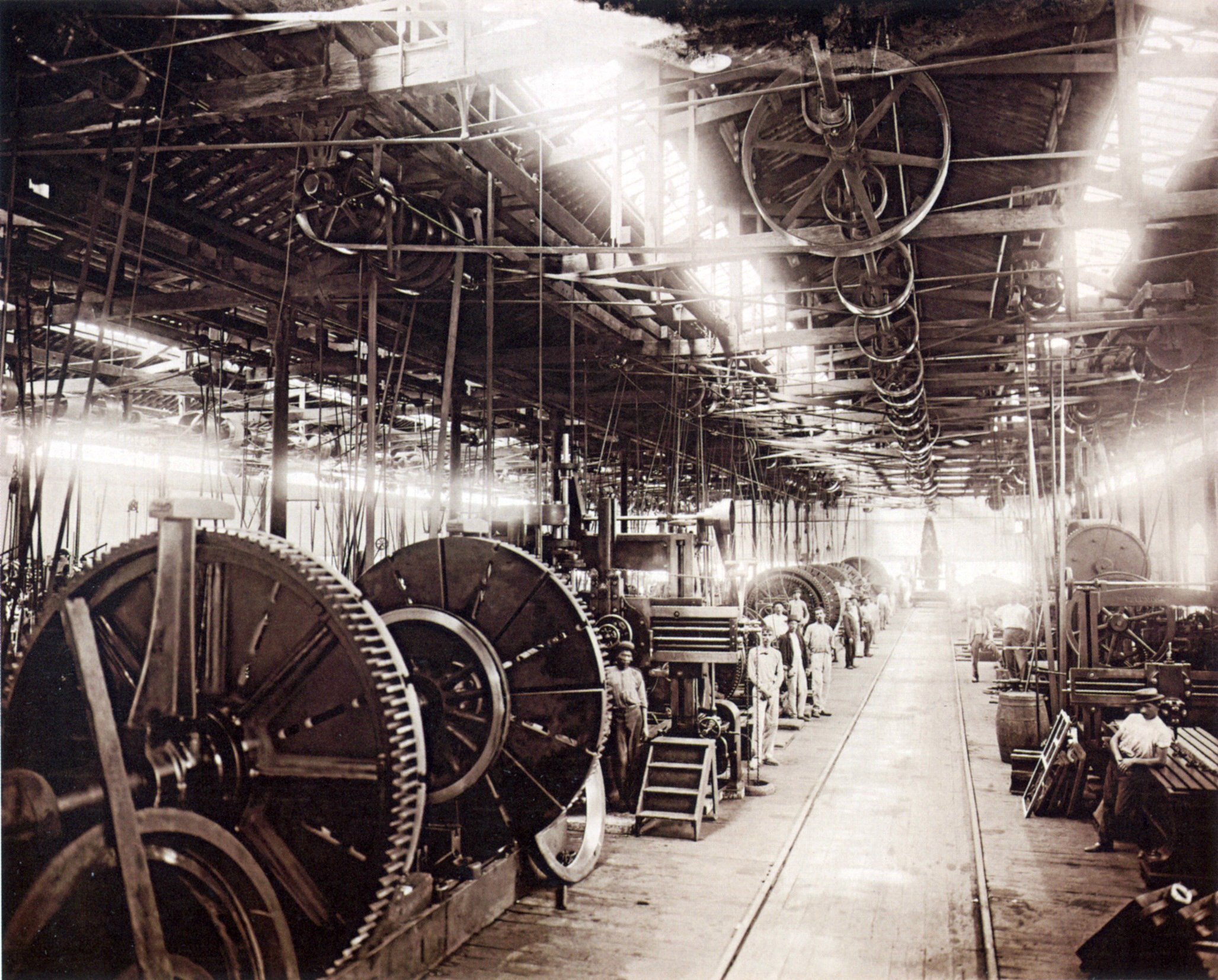
- A factory in Brazil, 1880
- Currency: Real (Rs)

Statistics
- GDP: Rs 500.000:000$000 (PPP; 1889)
- GDP rank: 15th (PPP, 1880 estimates)
- GDP growth: 4,81%
- GDP per capita: Rs 34$882 (1889)
- GDP by sector: Agriculture (80%) service (13%) industry (7%)
- Labour force by occupation: farming, forestry, and fishing (80%), manufacturing, mining, transportation, and crafts (7%) and services (13%)
- Main industries: steel; chemicals; culture; food processing; consumer goods; lumber; mining; defense

External
- Exports: Rs 212.592:000$000 (1888)
- Export goods: coffee 61.5%, sugar 9.9%, rubber 8.0%, leather and skins 3.2%, cotton 4.2%, others 13.2% (1881–1890)
- Main export partners: United Kingdom; Argentina; Kingdom of Portugal; Uruguay
- Imports: Rs 260.099:000$000 (1888)
- Import goods: coal, machinery, cement, iron, iron goods, iron tools, woven goods, wines, soaps, comestibles, perfumes (c. 1850)
- Main import partners: United Kingdom 28% France; Kingdom of Portugal; Argentina
- Gross external debt: £ 30,282,299 (1889)

Public finances
- Revenues: Rs 11.795:000$000 (1831); Rs 16.310:000$000 (1840); Rs 32.696:000$000 (1850); Rs 50.051:000$000 (1860); Rs 95.885:000$000 (1870); Rs 128.364:000$000 (1880); Rs 160.840:000$000 (1889)
- All values, unless otherwise stated, are in US dollars.

The economy of the Empire of Brazil (1822–1889) was centered on the export of raw materials when the country became independent in 1822. The domestic market was small, due to lack of credit and the almost complete self-sustainability of the cities, villages and farms that dedicated themselves to food production and cattle herding. During the first half of the 19th century, the Imperial Government invested heavily in the improvement of roads while retaining an excellent system of ports. The former facilitated better commercial exchange and communication between the country's distant regions; the latter did the same for foreign trade.

The Brazilian economy was extremely diversified in the post-Independence period, but a great effort was required of the monarchical government to carry through the change from a purely colonial economic system based on slavery in Brazil to a modern capitalist system. Until its end, the monarchy continued the notable economic growth that began with the arrival of Prince Regent John of Braganza in 1808. This was caused, in part, by the liberalism adopted by successive Government cabinets up to 1889 that favored the private initiative.

== Currency ==
The unit of currency under the Empire (and until 1942) was the real ("royal"), plural réis, a name derived from the Portuguese real. It was usually called milréis (English: thousand royals), being written as 1$000. "A thousand milréis (1:000$000) was known as conto de réis." One conto de réis was represented by the symbol Rs written before the value and by a dollar sign separating the units group (lower than 1,000 réis). Thus, 350 réis was written as "Rs 350"; 1,712 réis as "Rs 1$712"; and 1,020,800 réis was written as "Rs 1:020$800". This means that the colon functioned as the millions comma and the $ sign as the thousands comma; the colon is the actual group separator, and the $ sign is used only for separating the smaller group of units.

== Overview ==
For a country devoid of capital, economic improvement would require as much investment as possible in production for export. However, such a course was complicated by the almost complete lack of Brazilian manufactured products. This lack resulted in a considerable increase in importation, creating a continuous deficit. Most prominent among the imports were woven goods, wines, soaps, comestibles, and perfumes, amongst others. Until the 1850s, such items as coal, machinery, cement, iron, iron goods and iron tools represented 11% of the Brazilian imports from Great Britain. But the process of constant industrialization of Brazil would increase this percentage to 28% in 1889.

As the decades passed, new technologies appeared, and with the increase of the internal productivity, exports increased considerably, making it possible to reach the desired equilibrium in the balance of trade. During the 1820s, sugar constituted about 30% of total exports, while cotton constituted 21%, coffee 18% and leather and skins 14%. Twenty years later, coffee would reach 42%, sugar 27%, leather and skins 9%, and cotton 8% of the total exports. However, this did not mean a reduction in the production of these any of these items—in fact, the opposite occurred—but "it reflected a difference in the relative growth of these sectors". In this period of only twenty years, according to the historian Boris Fausto, "Brazilian exports had doubled in volume and had tripled in nominal value", while its value in pounds sterling increased by over 40%.

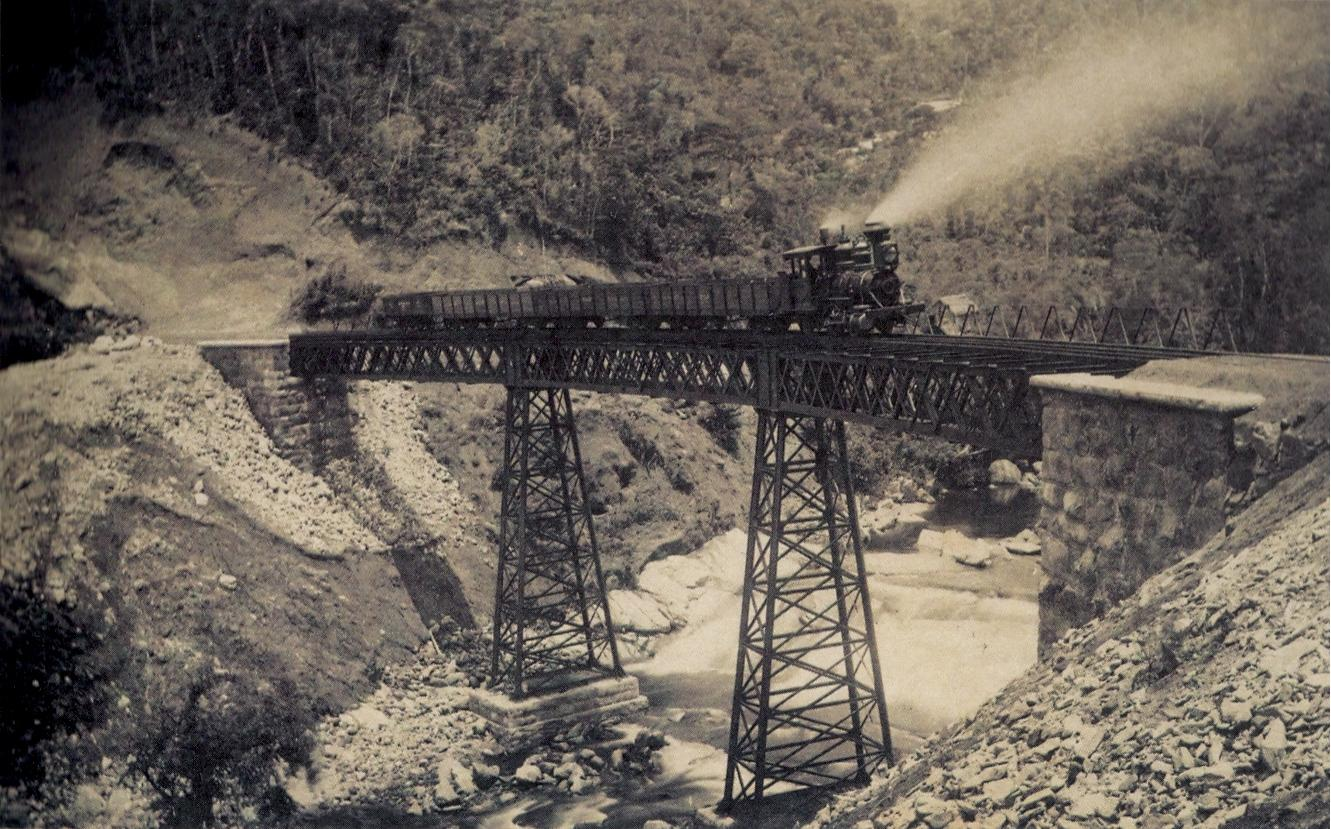
Railroad in Petrópolis, 1885. The advent of the trains allowed cargo transportation to become less onerous and much faster, considerably diminishing production costs

In the 1820s, Brazil exported 11,000 tons of cacao, while in 1880 this had increased to 73,500 tons. Between 1821 and 1825, it exported 41,174 tons of sugar and then it reached the level of 238,074 tons between 1881 and 1885. Up to 1850, rubber production was insignificant, but between 1881 and 1890, it reached the third place among Brazilian exports. It was about 81 tons between 1827 and 1830, and reached 1,632 tons in 1852. By 1900 the country had exported 24,301,452 tons of rubber. Brazil also exported around 3,377,000 tons of coffee between 1821 and 1860, while between 1861 and 1889 this reached 6,804,000 tons. Technological innovation also contributed to the growth of exports. The main reason for this was the adoption of steam navigation and railroads, which allowed transportation of cargoes to become much less onerous and much faster. The first railroad line in the country, with only 15 kilometers, was opened on 30 April 1854 when many European countries did not have one. In 1868 there were 718 kilometers of railroads lines. By the end of the Empire in 1889 it grew to 9,200 kilometers while another 9,000 kilometers were under construction.

The absolute value of the exports of the Empire in 1850 was the highest in Latin America (triple that of Argentina, which was in fourth place); Brazil would keep this position in this respect and in general economic terms until the end of the monarchy. Brazil's international trade, that is, the sum of both its imports and exports, amounted to a total value of Rs 79.000:000$000 between 1834 and 1839 and increased every year until it reached Rs 472.000:000$000 in 1886 (an annual growth of 3.88% since 1839). In 1859 the balance of payments between imports and exports reached equilibrium; exports gradually increased relative to imports, and the Empire's balance of trade became consistently positive from 1865 on. After 1874, the balance of payments became clearly favorable. Most Brazilian exports were agricultural goods. For comparison, between 1850 and 1900 agricultural goods constituted between 73% and 83% of the United States' total exports. Economic growth was perceived in the Brazilian Gross Domestic Product (GDP), which from circa 50.000:000$000 in 1840, reached a figure of 500.000:000$000 in 1889 (an annual growth rate of 4.81% since 1840). Brazilian economic growth, especially after 1850, compared "very well" with that of the United States and European countries, according to the historian Boris Fausto. In the last year of the monarchy, Brazil was a "prosperous and [internationally] respected" country, according to historian Oliveira Lima. Historian Heitor Lyra wrote that:

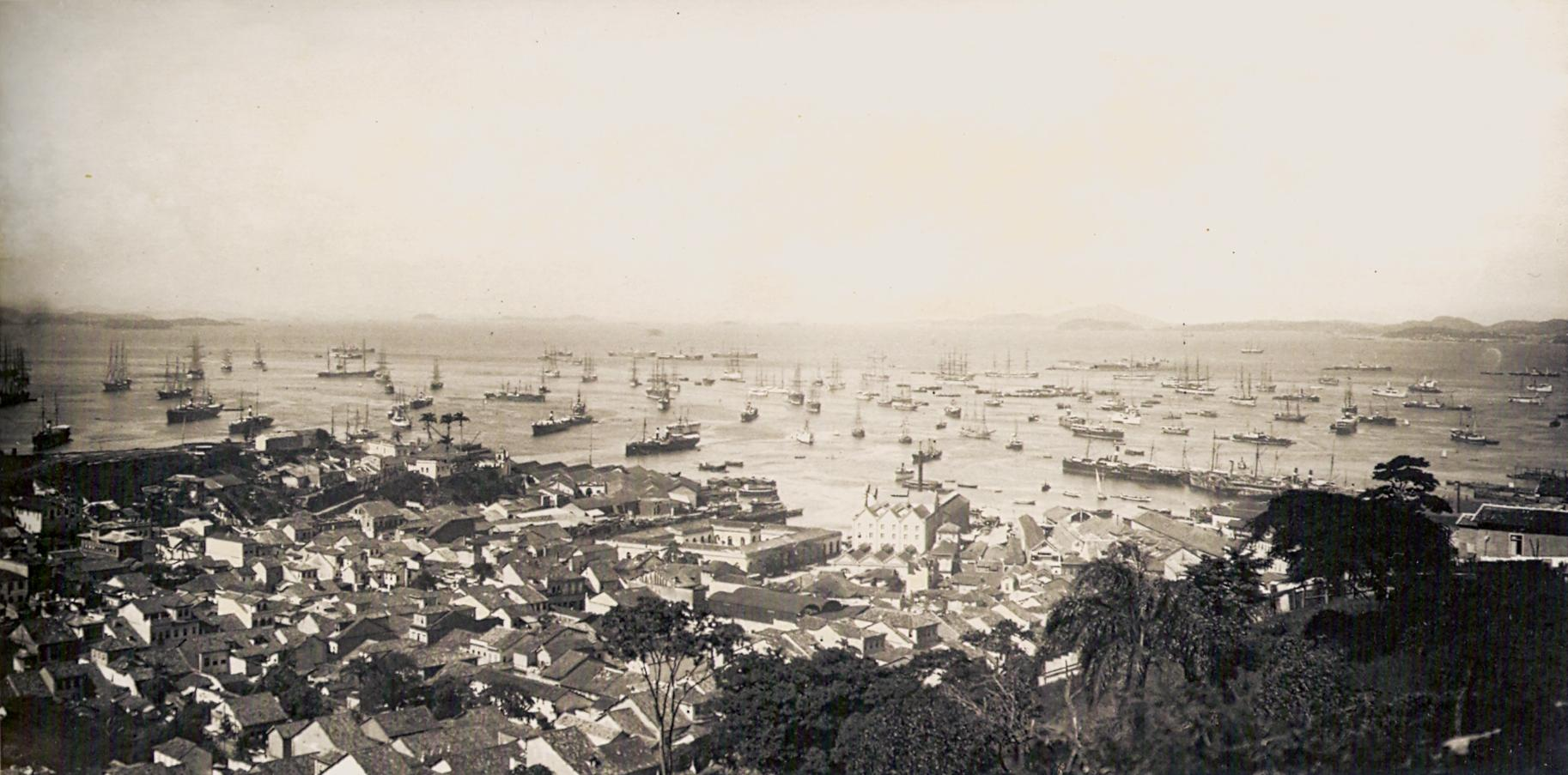
View from downtown of the city of Rio de Janeiro, 1889. International trade grew 3.88% annually over the course of 47 years

The Empire, from the point of view of progress and material development of the country, was not a period of the backwardness and stagnation with which it is still today charged by many who do not want to work to better learn and know about this period of our History. And the truth is that Brazil was, in fact, and righteously, in this and other aspects, the first Nation of Latin America. This hegemony it would keep until the last day of the Monarchy.

The Brazilian per capita income in 1890 was of $770 (in 1990 US dollars). To give an idea of the economic potential of the country during the Empire, if "it had been able to keep the level of productivity achieved in 1870 and managed to increase exports at a pace equal to the one verified in the second half of 19th century, its per capita income in 1950 would be comparable to the average per capita income the Western European countries, and the country would not have fallen so much behind the others". That is, at the beginning of the second half of the 20th century, the country would not only be richer, and the Brazilian people would have had a far higher standard of living than actually prevailed at that time. According to João de Scantimburgo, what "hindered the political, social and economical progress of Brazil was the First Republic [that began at the end of 1889], and its consequences stretched to the future".

The Empire of Brazil had a GDP almost 40% higher than the one of Argentina in 1890 ($11 billion compared to $7 billion in 1990 US dollars). By 1913, Argentina had the fourth greatest economy in the world, a GDP per capita equal to Germany and the Netherlands and higher than Spain, Italy, Sweden and Switzerland. Its GDP was 31% higher than Brazil's ($29 billion compared to $20 billion). The Brazilian economy would reach the Argentine economy only in the 1940s, more than 50 years after the end of the monarchy.

Export goods and percentage share by decade
Years	Coffee	Sugar	Cotton	Rubber	Leather and skins	Others	Total
1821–1830	18,4%	30,1%	20,6%	0,1%	13,6%	17,2%	100%
1831–1840	43,8%	24,1%	10,8%	0,3%	7,9%	13,2%	100%
1841–1850	41,4%	26,7%	7,5%	0,4%	8,5%	15,5%	100%
1851–1860	48,8%	21,2%	6,2%	2,3%	7,2%	6,0%	100%
1861–1870	45,5%	12,3%	18,3%	3,1%	6,0%	14,8%	100%
1871–1880	56,6%	11,8%	9,5%	5,5%	5,6%	11,0%	100%
1881–1889	61,5%	9,9%	4,2%	8,0%	3,2%	13,2%	100%

== Agriculture ==
Agriculture held an extremely important role in Brazil under the Empire: 80% of the labor force was dedicated to the primary sector, 13% to tertiary sector and 7% to the secondary sector. In the rural area of the country, agriculture was done by the producers themselves (that is, without the use of slaves), supplying the local market. In the north and northeast regions cotton was cultivated, and small-to-medium-sized farms produced food for subsistence and for local markets. The great distances raised the cost of the transport, coupled with the taxes for interprovincial transit of goods, considerably restricted the capacity of distribution by the producers of the sectors related to the domestic market.

Year	Cacao (tons exported)
1820s	11,000 tons
1880	73,500 tons
Year	Rubber (tons exported)
1827	81 tons
1852	1,632 tons
1900	24,301,452 tons
Year	Coffee (tons exported)
1821–60	3,377,000 tons
1861–89	6,804,000 tons
Year	Sugar (tons exported)
1821–25	41,174 tons
1881–85	238,074 tons

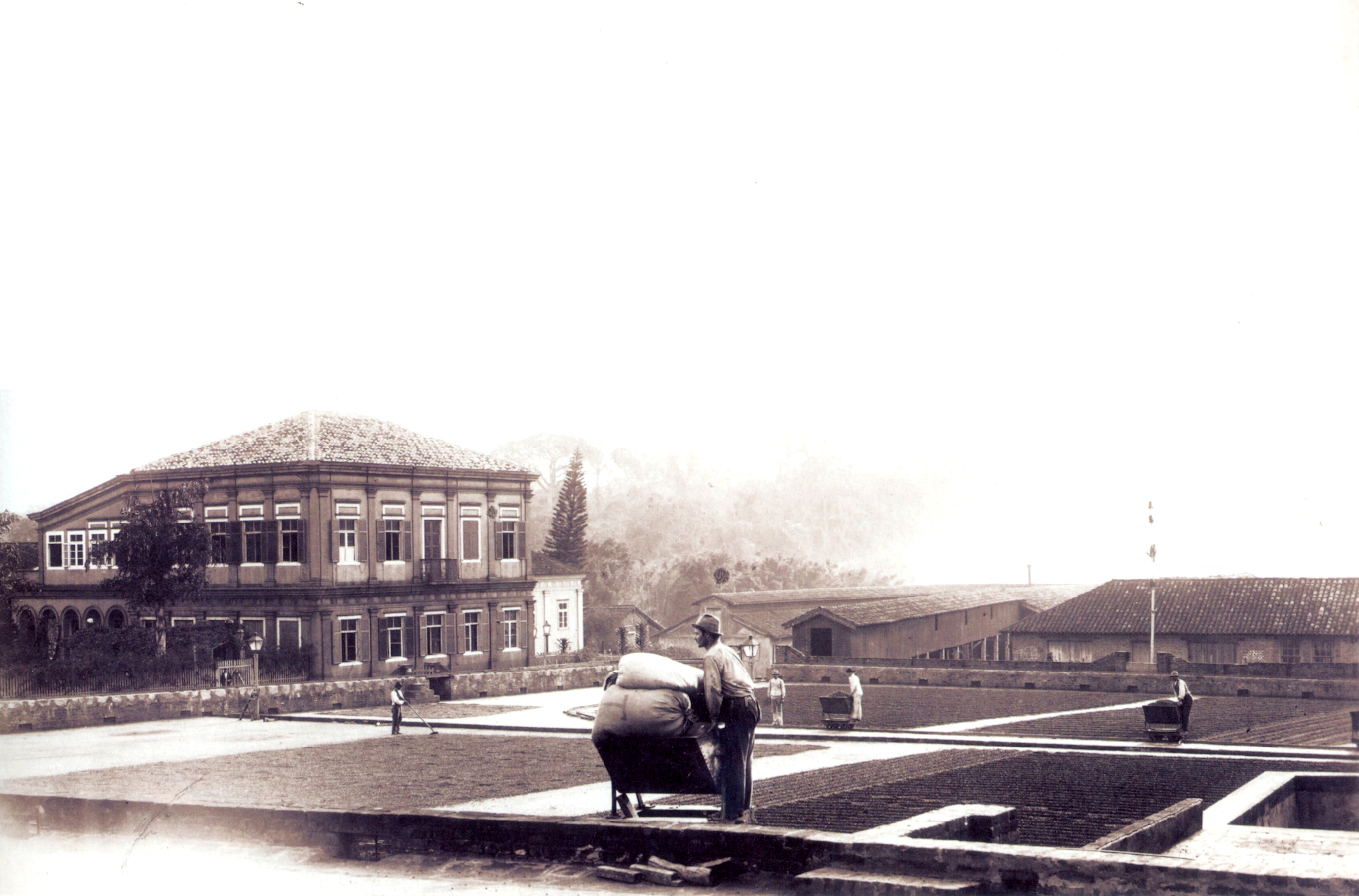
Farm in the province of São Paulo, 1880. Agricultural producers sought to modernize their enterprises to keep competitive in the international market

In the southeastern region the coffee production that at the beginning of independent Brazil amounted to only 3% of exports started to become more important for the Brazilian economy with each decade that passed, mainly because of extraordinary increase of consumers in the international market. The coffee farms were practically self-sustaining: they did not produce only coffee, but also food and clothes for the slaves, preventing the emergence of economic sectors to serve those markets. However, the suppression of the importation of slaves in 1850 (and the consequent rise in the price of slaves) compelled the producers to focus in the maintenance of manpower, to the detriment of self-sustainability. They sought means to limit the rising costs of production.

To remain competitive in the international market, agricultural producers modernized the production with governmental aid, adopting technical and technological innovations. In the north and northeast of the country, great centers called engenhos centrais ("central engines") were established for the processing of sugar cane, which revolutionized the traditional economy. These plants came to occupy the place of the old sugar cane mills that dated from the colonial period, effectively industrializing the sector.

At the coffee plantation regions the producers made the transition from the enslaved man power to the paid one, with the absorption of foreign immigrants who arrived at the thousands each year and of former slaves. The benefits were many, but the main one was the reduction of the production cost, as the sustenance of slaves revealed that were more onerous than the payment of wages of free workers. The province of São Paulo was the one that better reached success as it went from the old slavery economic system to the modern capitalist economic system. The province of Rio de Janeiro, however, revealed itself incapable of assimilating the new trends of the market, as it preferred to keep the use of enslaved man power until the end, which would eventually cause its economic collapse at the end of the Empire.

The imperial government was not limited to facilitate the credit for the purchase of modern equipment or the arrival of immigrants, but also diminished taxes to collaborate with the effort of modernization of the country's agricultural production. One of these measures occurred in 1874 when the Rio Branco cabinet fixed at 40% the custom house tax for all the imported goods (which would come to stimulate the national industry) at the same time as it created taxes for related importations of plants, seeds, roots, bulbs and mechanical devices with the intention of developing the agriculture.

== Industry ==
=== Origins ===
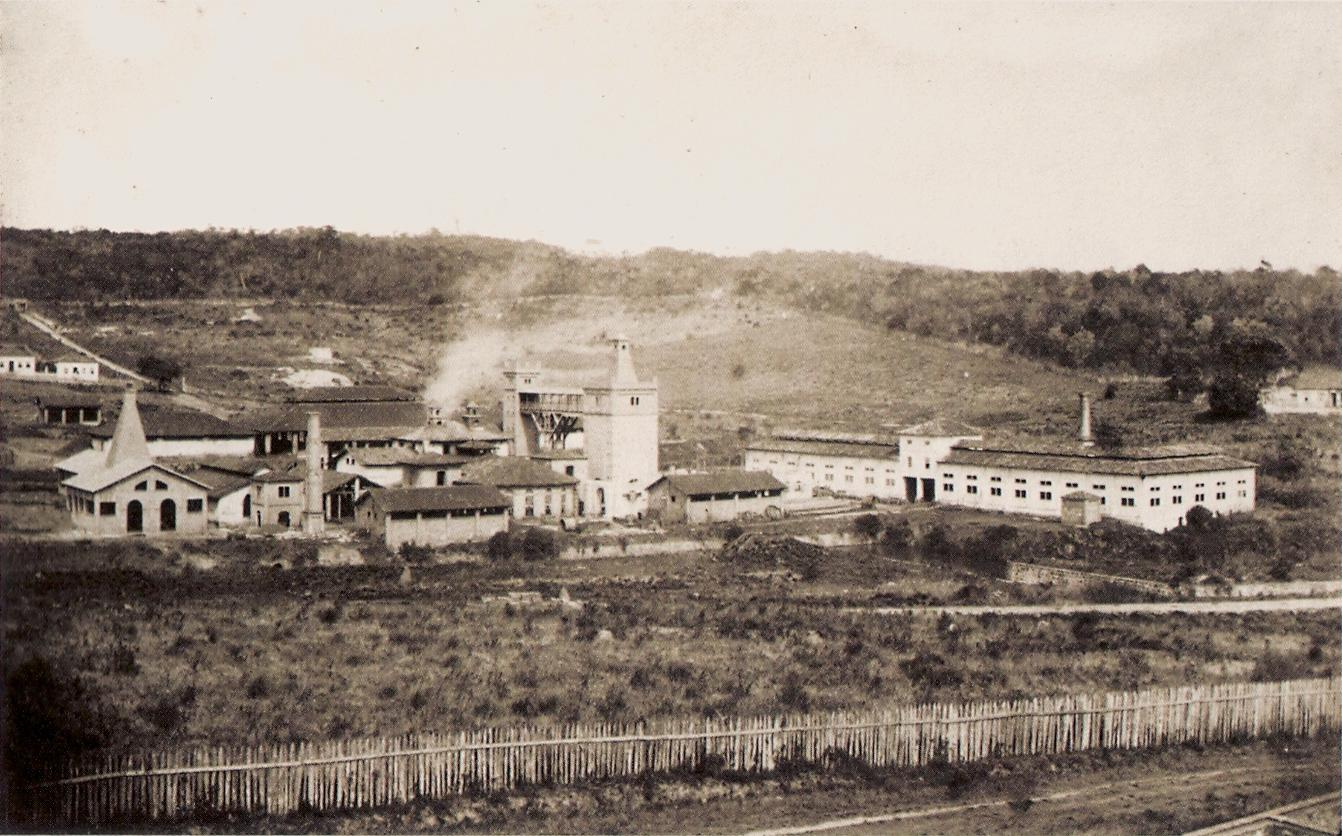
Iron factory in Sorocaba, province of São Paulo, 1884

Brazilian industry has its earliest origin in workshops dating from the beginning of the 19th century. Most of the country's industrial establishments appeared in the Brazilian southeast (mainly in the provinces of Rio de Janeiro, Minas Gerais and, later, São Paulo), and, according to the Commerce, Agriculture, Factories and Navigation Joint, 77 establishments registered between 1808 and 1840 were classified as “factories” or “manufacturers”. However, most, about 56 establishments, would be considered workshops by today's standards, directed toward the production of soap and candles of tallow, snuff tobacco, spinning and weaving, foods, melting of iron and metals, wool and silk, amongst others. They used both slaves and free laborers.

There were twenty establishments that could be considered in fact manufacturers, and of this total, thirteen were created between the years 1831 and 1840. All were, however, of small size and more resembled large workshops than proper factories. Still, the manufactured goods were quite diverse: hats, combs, farriery and sawmills, spinning and weaving, soap and candles, glasses, carpets, oil, etc. Probably because of the instability of the regency period, only nine of these establishments were still functioning in 1841, but these nine were of great size and could be considered to “presage a new era for manufactures”. The advent of real manufacturing before the 1840s was extremely limited, due to the self-sufficiency of the regions of the country (mainly farms producing coffee and sugar cane, which produced their own food, clothes, equipment, etc.), the lack of capital, and high costs of production that made it impossible for national manufactures to compete with foreign products. Costs were high because most of the raw materials were imported, even though some of the plants already used machines.

=== Growth ===
The promulgation of the Alves Branco Tariff would modify this picture. This tariff succeeded in increasing State revenues and stimulating growth of national industry. The sudden proliferation of capital was directed to investments in the areas of urban services, transports, commerce, banks, industries, etc. Most of the capital invested in industries was directed toward textiles. With unprecedented industrial growth, multiple manufacturing establishments appeared, dedicated to such diverse products as melting of iron and metal, machinery, soap and candles, glasses, beer, vinegar, gallons of gold and silver, shoes, hats and cotton fabric.

One of the main establishments created at this period was the metallurgical factory Ponta da Areia (In English: Sand Tip), in the city of Niterói, that also constructed steamships. It is likely that the textile industry benefited most by the virtue of being the oldest in the country. It first appeared in 1826, in the city of Recife, capital of the province of Pernambuco. The textile sector was quite dynamic in the monarchic period and received large investments until 1890, when it entered into decline. Various modernizations occurred, principally between 1840 and 1860, when factories with a high level of technological capability were created, able to compete with other major international centers. Other improvements came with the establishment of factories and forges geared for the production of equipment and pieces for textile manufacture. Moreover, Ready-made clothing is a major commodity group in the Brazilian exports of textile and garment industry its share is $742 million, or 35% of the total volume of exported manufactured goods. The concentration of industry that emerged in the province of Bahia considerably expanded its economic scope, reaching the south of Ceará, Piauí and even Minas Gerais.

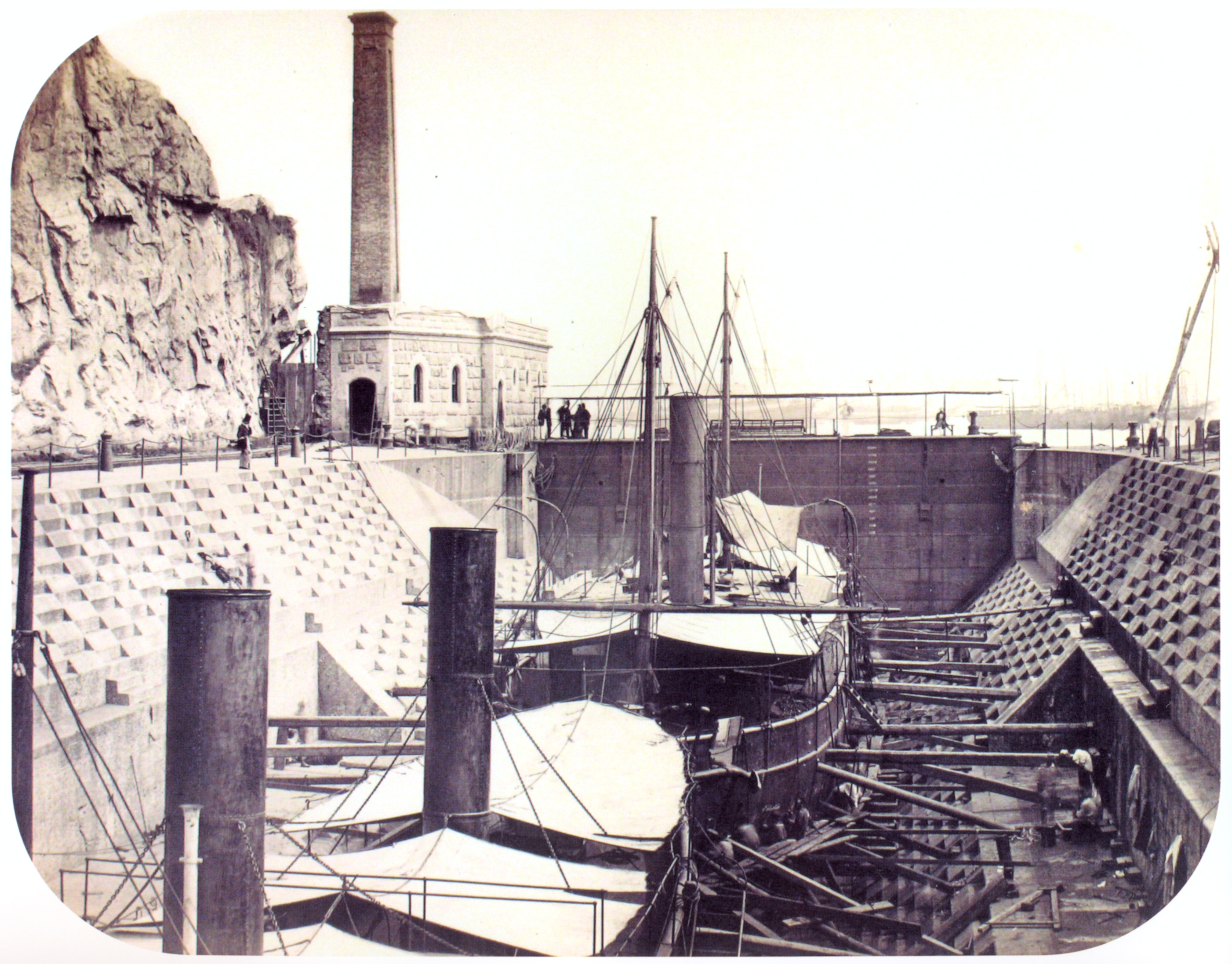
Shipyard in the city of Rio de Janeiro, c.1862

The extinction of the traffic in African slaves in 1850, contrary to what many authors allege, did not "liberate" credit for industrial development. That claim has no documentary basis whatever. On the contrary, capital employed in the trade had already been directed to sectors such as enterprises of urban services, transport, banking and trade. But it is possible that there was an indirect contribution to the growth of the industrial sector through banking loans. In 1850, there were 50 factories with a capital of at least Rs 7.000:000$000.

The imperial government created several incentives for the industrialization of the country. The earliest of these date from the reign of Dom Pedro I, through awards of government grants. The first establishment to receive such a grant was the Fábrica das Chitas (In English: Chitas Factory), devoted to paper and printing, by a decree of 26 June 1826. The practice was resumed in the 1840s, when new industrial establishments received subsidies. in 1857, seven factories benefited from this practice of incentives, among them, the Ponta da Areia mentioned above and that was owned by Irineu Evangelista de Sousa (later Viscount of Mauá). One of the criteria for the granting of these subsidies was the exclusive employment of free workers.

The goal, then, was not only the transition from the old colonial economic system to that of the modern capitalist, but also from slave labor to free. Other incentives arose, such as the decree of 8 August 1846 that exempted manufactured products from certain transport taxes (internally as well as externally), shielded from military recruitment a determinate number of employees of industrial establishments and eliminated tariffs on parts and machinery imported for textile factories. The following year in June, a new decree stated that all industrial establishments on national soil would be free of taxes on imported raw materials. Thus, production costs of domestic industry dropped considerably, allowing it to compete with foreign products. The Alves Branco tariff underwent modification in 1857, reducing to 15% the tax on imported products. Later, under the Rio Branco cabinet at the beginning of the 1870s, the tariff on foreign products was newly raised to 40%, and new raw materials were exempted from import taxes.

=== Expansion ===
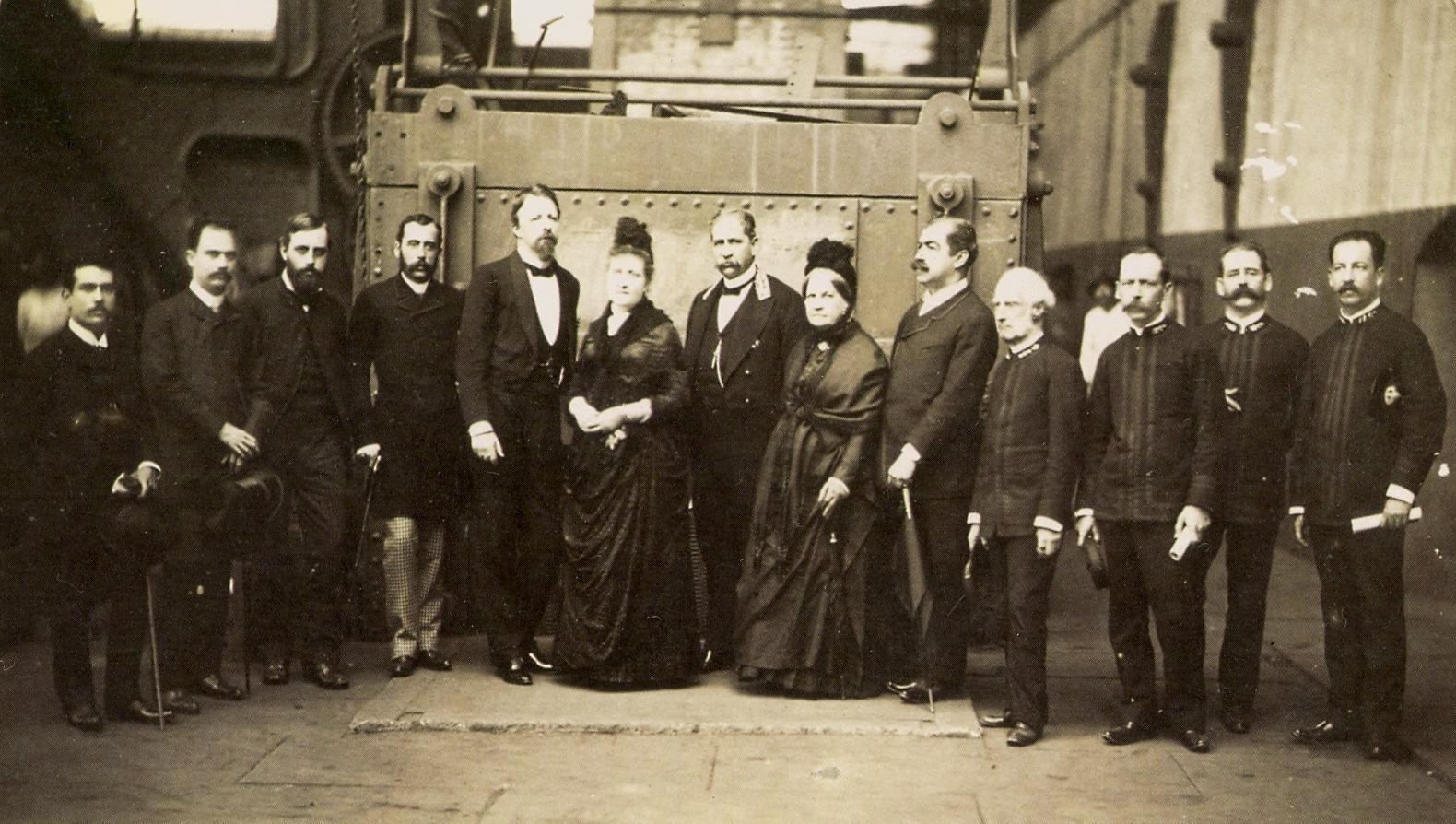
Prince Gaston, Count of Eu and Princess Imperial Isabel, along with officials visiting the plant dedicated to the manufacture of military weapons, 1886

At the end of the 1860s, came a new industrial surge caused by two armed conflicts: the American Civil War and the Paraguayan War. Because of the first, U.S. production of cotton was interrupted by the blockade of the Union forces against the Confederacy. The second resulted in the emission of currency and an increase in import tariffs to cover the costs of war. This resulted in a great stimulus not only for the textile industry, but also for other sector, such as chemicals, cigars, glass, paper, leather, and optical and nautical instruments. During the 1870s, thanks to the decline of the coffee region of the Paraíba Valley and some areas of sugar production, many owners of plantations invested not only in the cotton textile industry, but also in other manufacturing sectors. Deployment of a railway network throughout the national territory also stimulated the emergence of new industrial activities, mainly in São Paulo. Industry also experienced a major impetus in this period. From the 1870s onward, the great expansion of industrialization became a constant in Brazil. In 1866, there were 9 textile factories with 795 workers. In 1881, there were 46 textile factories through the country: 12 in Bahia; 11 in Rio de Janeiro; 9 in São Paulo; 9 in Minas Gerais; and 5 in other provinces. The number of establishments diminished a little by 1885 to 42 textile factories with 3,172 workers. However, it did not harm the overall growth in the sector up to 1889.

In 1880 the Industrial Association was established, with its first board elected the following year. The Association supported new industrial incentives and propagandized against the defenders of an essentially agricultural Brazil. 9.6% of the capital of the Brazilian economy was directed toward industry by 1884, and by 1885, 11.2%. This figure dropped sharply during the republican period, falling to 5% between 1895 and 1899, and improving slightly to 6% between 1900 and 1904. Still, it would take many years to return to the level that prevailed during the Empire. At the time of its downfall in 1889, monarchical Brazil had 636 factories (representing an annual rate of increase of 6.74% from 1850) with a capital of Rs 401.630:600$000 (annual growth rate of 10.94% since 1850). Of this amount, 60% were employed in the textile sector, 15% in food, 10% in the chemical, 4% in timber, 3.5% in clothing and 3% in metallurgy.

== See also ==
- Empire of Brazil
- Economic history of Brazil
- Industrialisation

== Bibliography ==
- Calmon, Pedro (2002). História da Civilização Brasileira (in Portuguese). Brasília: Senado Federal.
- Enciclopédia Barsa. Volume 4: Batráquio – Camarão, Filipe. Rio de Janeiro: Encyclopædia Britannica do Brasil, 1987. (in Portuguese)
- Fausto, Boris; Devoto, Fernando J. (2005). Brasil e Argentina: Um ensaio de história comparada (1850–2002) (in Portuguese) (2 ed.). São Paulo: Editoria 34.
- Fausto, Boris (1995). História do Brasil (in Portuguese). São Paulo: Fundação de Desenvolvimento da Educação.
- Graça Filho, Afonso de Alencastro (2004). A economia do Império brasileiro (in Portuguese). São Paulo: Atual.
- Lima, Oliveira (1989). O Império brasileiro (in Portuguese). São Paulo: Itatiaia.
- Lyra, Heitor (1977). História de Dom Pedro II (1825–1891): Fastígio (1870–1880) (in Portuguese). Vol. 2. Belo Horizonte: Itatiaia.
- Mead, Walter Russel (2006). Uma orientação especial: a política externa norte-americana e sua influência no mundo (in Portuguese). Rio de Janeiro: Biblioteca do Exército.
- Nassif, Luís (2007). Os cabeças-de-planilha (in Portuguese) (2 ed.). Rio de Janeiro: Ediouro.
- Nobrega, Maílson da (6 May 2009). "A candidata e o câncer". VEJA (in Portuguese). No. 42 (2111 ed.).
- Scantimburgo, João de (1980). O Poder Moderador (in Portuguese). São Paulo: Secretaria de Estado da Cultura.
- Silva, Hélio (2005). 1889: A República não esperou o amanhecer (in Portuguese). Porto Alegre: L&PM.
- Sodré, Nelson Werneck (2004). Panorama do Segundo Império (in Portuguese) (2 ed.). Rio de Janeiro: GRAPHIA.
- Szmrecsány, Tamás; Lapa, José Roberto do Amaral (2002). História Econômica da Independência e do Império (in Portuguese) (2 ed.). São Paulo: USP.
- Vainfas, Ronaldo (2002). Dicionário do Brasil Imperial (in Portuguese). Rio de Janeiro: Objetiva.
- Vianna, Hélio (1994). História do Brasil: período colonial, monarquia e república (in Portuguese) (15 ed.). São Paulo: Melhoramentos.
