= Boris Fausto =

Brazilian historian (1930–2023)

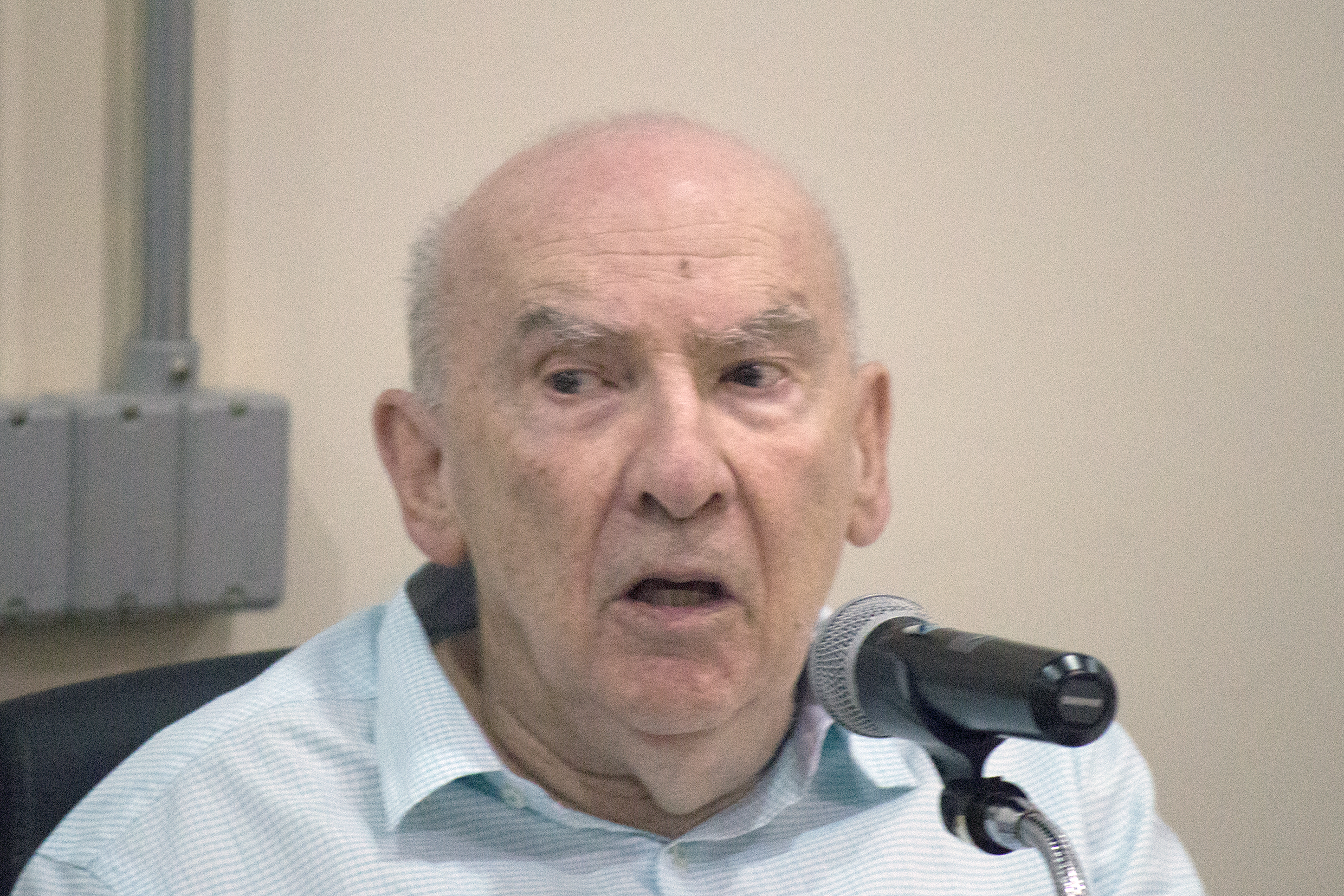
- Fausto in 2015
- Born: 8 December 1930; São Paulo, São Paulo, Brazil
- Died: 18 April 2023 (aged 92); São Paulo, São Paulo, Brazil
- Occupations: Historian, professor, political scientist, lawyer
- Children: Sérgio Fausto; Carlos Fausto

Boris Fausto (8 December 1930 – 18 April 2023) was a Brazilian historian, political scientist and writer.

During his career, he carried out studies on the political history of Brazil in the republican period, about mass immigration to Brazil, crime and criminality in São Paulo and authoritarian thinking.

One of his main works is Revolução de 1930 - historiografia e história (The 1930 Revolution - historiography and history), first published in 1970, in which he confronts visions that defend the state of São Paulo during the 1930 revolution and the subsequent 1932 Constitutionalist Revolution.

== Early life ==
Fausto was born to a family of Jewish immigrants. His mother, Eva, was born in Turkey, while his father Simon, was born in Transylvania, current Romania. He attended Colégio Mackenzie as an elementary student and Colégio São Bento at high school. He graduated in Law in 1953 and then mastered in History in 1966 at University of São Paulo (USP). In 1965, he became an assistant professor at the School of Philosophy and Human Sciences of the Pontifical Catholic University of São Paulo (PUC-SP). In 1968 he post-graduated at USP and, in the same year, obtained his doctor's degree. In 1975 he became an associate professor of political sciences at USP and from 1988 to 1997, he was a retired professor-collaborator of the Political Sciences Department of USP. In 2001, he was nominated for the Brazilian Academy of Sciences.

== Personal life and death ==
In 1961, he married educator and co-founder of Escola Vera Cruz, Cynira Stocco Fausto (1931–2010), with whom he had two sons, sociologist Sérgio Fausto and anthropologist Carlos Fausto.

Fausto died in São Paulo on 18 April 2023, at the age of 92.

== Awards ==
- 1995 - Prêmio Jabuti - Câmara Brasileira do Livro - Category Textbook (with História do Brasil)
- 1998 - Prêmio Jabuti - Câmara Brasileira do Livro - Category Human Sciences (with Negócios e ócios: histórias da imigração and Fazer a América: a imigração em massa para a América)
- 1999 - Annual Americas's Award - The Crime, Law and Deviance Section of the American Sociological Association.
- 2000 - Prêmio Jabuti - Câmara Brasileira do Livro - Category Human Sciences

== Bibliography ==
=== Author ===
- Trabalho urbano e conflito social, DIFEL, 1977; Ed. Bertrand Brasil, 5.e., 2000.
- Crime e cotidiano: A Criminalidade em São Paulo (1880-1924), 1.ed., Editora Brasiliense 1984; 2.ed., EDUSP, 2001.
- Historiografia da imigração para São Paulo, IDESP, Editora Sumaré, 1991.
- História do Brasil, Fundação para o Desenvolvimento da Educação, 1994.
- Brasil, de colônia a democracia, Alianza, 1995. | (em espanhol)
- Imigração e política em São Paulo, Editora Sumaré, 1995 | Diversos autores.
- A Revolução de 1930: historiografia e história, Companhia das Letras, 1997.
- Negócios e ócios: histórias da imigração, Companhia das Letras, 1997.
- Fazer a América: a imigração em massa para a América, EDUSP, 1999. (organizer)
- História Concisa do Brasil, EDUSP, IMESP, 2000.
- O pensamento nacionalista autoritário, Jorge Zahar Editor, 2001.
- Brasil e Argentina: Um ensaio de história comparada (1850-2002), Editora 34, 2004. | Co-autoria: Fernando J. Devoto.
- Memória e história, Editora Graal, 2005.
- Céu da boca: Lembranças de refeições da infância, Editora Ágora (Summus Editorial), 2006. | Various authors
- Getúlio Vargas: O poder e o sorriso, Companhia das Letras, 2006.
- O crime do restaurante chinês: Carnaval, futebol e justiça na São Paulo dos anos 30, Companhia das Letras, 2009.
- Memórias de um historiador de domingo, Companhia das Letras, 2010.

=== Collection General History of the Brazilian Civilization ===
A collection released in the 1990s and re-released in the 2000s by Editora Bertrand Brasil, co-written with Sérgio Buarque de Hollanda.

- Vol.01 - A época colonial: do descobrimento à expansão territorial.
- Vol.02 - A época colonial: administração, economia, sociedade.
- Vol.03 - O Brasil monárquico: o processo de emancipação.
- Vol.04 - O Brasil monárquico: dispersão e Unidade.
- Vol.05 - O Brasil monárquico: reações e transações.
- Vol.06 - O Brasil monárquico: declínio e queda do Império.
- Vol.07 - O Brasil monárquico: do Império à República.
- Vol.08 - O Brasil republicano: estrutura de poder e economia (1889–1930).
- Vol.09 - O Brasil republicano: sociedade e instituições (1889–1930).
- Vol.10 - O Brasil republicano: sociedade e política (1930–1964).
- Vol.11 - O Brasil republicano: economia e cultura (1930–1964).

=== Participation ===
- Ladrilhadores e semeadores: a modernização brasileira no pensamento político de Oliveira Vianna, Sérgio Buarque de Holanda, Azevedo Amaral e Nestor Duarte (1920–1940) - (Prefácio de Bóris Fausto), Luiz Guilherme Piva, Editora 34, 2000.
- Conversas com historiadores brasileiros, (Org. José Geraldo Vinci de Moraes e José Marcio Rego), Editora 34, 2002.
