= 2009–10 São Tomé and Príncipe Championship =

São Tomé and Principe Championship
- Season: 2009-10
- Champions: GD Sundy
- Matches played: 1

Location of teams in the São Tomé and Príncipe Championship 2009 & 2010 .

The 2009–10 São Tomé and Principe Championship was the 25th season of the São Tomé and Principe Championship the top-level football championship of São Tomé and Principe. It began in May 2009 and finished in March 2010. GD Sundy was the eleventh club to win the championship and brought the number of titles that Príncipe won by any club to five.

== Cancellations ==
After the cancellation of the football (soccer) competitions in São Tomé in 2008, the national championship was cancelled. The 2009 season suffered problems on the finishing date, the championship final took place in March 2010

The island and national football (soccer) competitions were cancelled for the 2010 season, the previous cancellations occurred in 2005, 2006 and in 2008. The next season occurred in 2011, a year after the cancellation.

== Teams ==
18 teams participated in the São Tomé and Principe Championship, 12 teams from São Tomé Island and 6 teams from Príncipe Island . At the end of season champion of São Tomé Island League and champion of Principe Island League play one match for champion of São Tomé and Principe.

== São Tomé Island League ==
This section lists only ten of the twelve clubs that participated that season. Vitória FC (Riboque) won the island title and competed in the national final.

Location of teams in the São Tomé 2011 .

=== Teams ===
Club	City	District	Island
Bairros Unidos FC	Caixão Grande	Mé-Zóchi	São Tomé Island
Cruz Vermelha	Almeirim	Água Grande	São Tomé Island
CD Guadalupe	Guadalupe	Lobata	São Tomé Island
Oque d'El Rei	Oque del Rei	Água Grande	São Tomé Island
Santana FC	Santana	Cantagalo	São Tomé Island
6 de Setembro	São Tomé	Água Grande	São Tomé Island
Sporting Praia Cruz	São Tomé	Água Grande	São Tomé Island
UDESCAI	Água Izé	Cantagalo	São Tomé Island
UDRA	São João dos Angolares	Caué	São Tomé Island
Vitória FC	São Tomé	Água Grande	São Tomé Island

== Principe teams 2011 ==
GD Sundy won the island title and competed in the national final

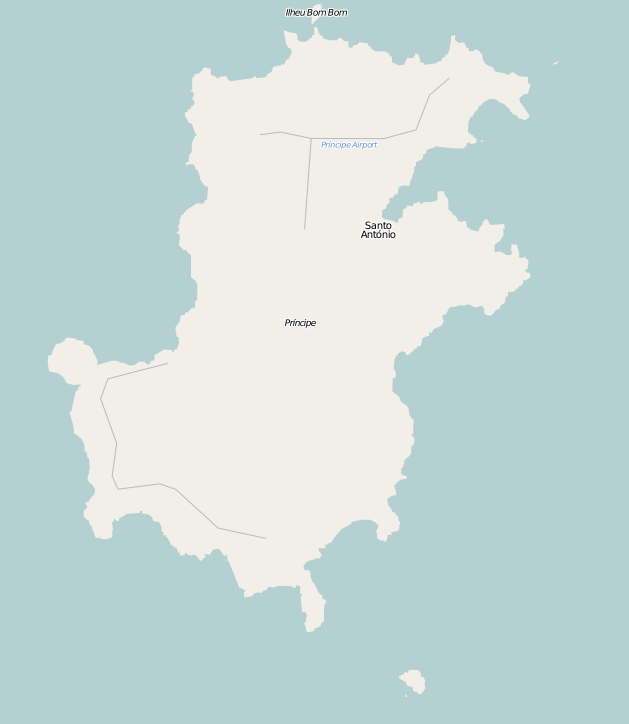
Location of teams in the Principe 2011 .

Club	City	District	Island
1º de Maio	Santo António	Pagué	Príncipe
GD Os Operários	Santo António	Pagué	Príncipe
FC Porto Real	Porto Real	Pagué	Príncipe
Sporting Clube do Príncipe	Santo António	Pagué	Príncipe
GD Sundy	Sundy	Pagué	Príncipe
UDAPB (Current champions)	Picão	Pagué	Príncipe

== National final ==
The 2009-10 nationalfinal took place in March 2010. GD Sundy of Príncipe defeated Vitória of São Tomé 3–1. Sundy did not participated in the 2011 CAF Champions League the following year.

== São Tomé and Príncipe Cup ==
In 2010, Sporting Clube do Príncipe, the winner of Príncipe faced 6 de Setembro, the winner of São Tomé and defeated the club 2–1 to win their only cup title.
