= 2014 São Tomé and Príncipe Championship =

São Tomé and Principe Championship
- Season: 2014
- Champions: UDRA
- Matches: 1

Location of teams in the São Tomé and Príncipe Championship 2014 .

The 2014 São Tomé and Principe Championship was the 29th season of the São Tomé and Principe Championship the top-level football championship of São Tomé and Principe. It began in 10 May (a week later than scheduled ) and concluded on December 17. Two national final matches occurred in the season. UDRA from São Tomé island won their first and only title.

== Teams ==
36 teams participated in the São Tomé and Principe Championship, 30 from São Tomé Island (10 in each division) and 6 from Príncipe Island. At the end of season champion of São Tomé Island League and champion of Principe Island League play one match for champion of São Tomé and Principe.

== São Tomé teams 2014 ==
=== Premier Division ===
Location of teams in the São Tomé Premier Division 2015. Juba Diogo Simão is not mapped here.

Ten clubs participated in the 2014 season (third time since its reduction), UDRA won their first and only title and went on to participate in the national championship match for the first time in November. Guadalupe and Trindade were relegated in the season.

==== Teams ====
Club	City	District
Aliança Nacional	Pantufo	Água Grande
Bairros Unidos FC	Caixão Grande	Mé-Zóchi
CD Guadalupe	Guadalupe	Lobata
Juba Diogo Simão	Diogo Simão	
FC Neves (Newly Promoted)	Neves	Lembá
Oque d'El Rei	Oque d’El Rei	Água Grande
Sporting Praia Cruz (Current champions)	São Tomé	Água Grande
Trindade (Newly Promoted)	Trindade	Mé-Zóchi
UDRA	São João dos Angolares	Caué
Vitória FC	São Tomé	Água Grande

==== League table ====
Pos	Team	Pld	W	D	L	GF	GA	GD	Pts	Qualification or relegation
1	UDRA	18	16	1	1	34	9	+25	49	Qualification for 2014 São Tomé and Principe Championship
2	Sporting Praia Cruz	0	0	0	0	0	0	0	0	
3	Bairros Unidos FC	0	0	0	0	0	0	0	0	
4	Vitória	0	0	0	0	0	0	0	0	
5	Juba Diogo Simão	0	0	0	0	0	0	0	0	
6	FC Neves	0	0	0	0	0	0	0	0	
7	Aliança Nacional	0	0	0	0	0	0	0	0	
8	Santana FC	0	0	0	0	0	0	0	0	
9	? (R)	0	0	0	0	0	0	0	0	Relegation to São Tomé Championship 2 division
10	? (R)	0	0	0	0	0	0	0	0	Relegation to São Tomé Championship 2 division

Updated to match(es) played on 9 November 2014. Source: São Tomé results 2014
Rules for classification: 1) points; 2) goal difference; 3) number of goals scored.
(R) Relegated

=== Second Division ===
Location of teams in the São Tomé Second Division 2014 .

The second division featured 10 clubs. Correia, Folha Fede and Santana, three clubs elevated into the premier division and Cruz Vermelha and UDESCAI were relegated into the third division.

- 1st: Folha Fede - elevated into the 2015 São Tomé Island Premier Division
- Agrosport
- Amador
- UD Correia - elevated into the 2015 São Tomé Island Premier Division
- Cruz Vermelha - relegated into the 2015 São Tomé Island Third Division
- 6 de Setembro - withdrawn from competition after the end of the season
- Inter Bom-Bom
- Micoló
- Santana FC - elevated into the 2015 São Tomé Island Premier Division
- UDESCAI - relegated into the 2015 São Tomé Island Third Division

=== Third Division ===
The third division featured 10 clubs. Porto Alegre and Ribeira Peixe were elevated into the second division.

Location of teams in the 2014 São Tomé Third (Honour) Division.
- Andorinha
- Boa Vista
- Conde
- Diogo Vaz
- Otótó
- Palmar - withdrawn from the competition at the end of the season
- Porto Alegre - elevated into the 2015 São Tomé Island Second Division
- Ribeira Peixe - elevated into the 2015 São Tomé Second Division
- Sporting São Tomé
- Varzim

=== Clubs not in competition ===
- Bela Vista

== Principe teams 2014 ==
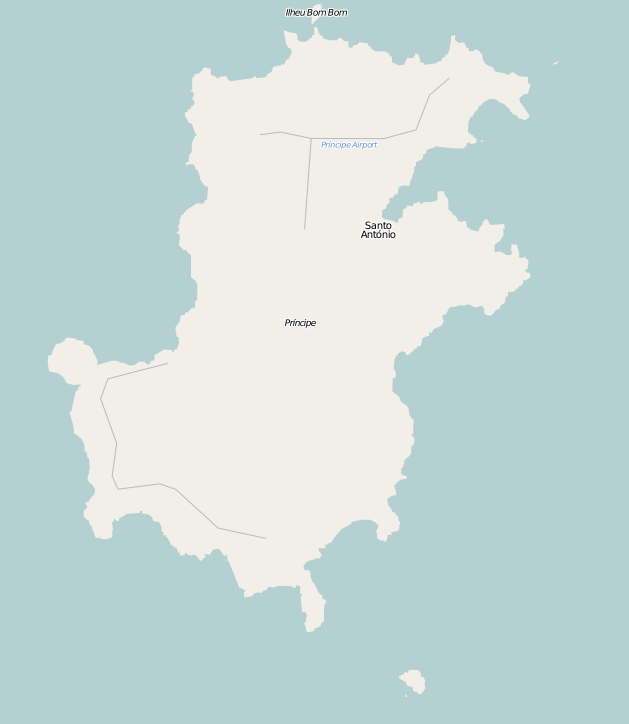
Location of teams in the Principe 2014. FC Porto Real is not mapped here.

Six clubs took part in the 2014 season. Again FC Porto Real won another title and participated in the national championship match in November.

Club	City	District
1º de Maio	Santo António	Pagué
GD Os Operários	Santo António	Pagué
FC Porto Real (Current champions)	Porto Real	Pagué
Sporting Clube do Príncipe	Santo António	Pagué
GD Sundy	Sundy	Pagué
UDAPB	Picão	Pagué

=== League table ===
Pos	Team	Pld	W	D	L	GF	GA	GD	Pts	Qualification
1	FC Porto Real	20	12	6	2	34	18	+16	42	Qualification for 2014 São Tomé and Principe Championship
2	Sporting Clube do Príncipe	20	11	5	4	29	21	+8	38	
3	GD Sundy	17	8	4	5	23	18	+5	28	
4	GS Os Operários	16	5	4	7	21	28	−7	19	
5	1o de Maio	16	4	3	9	2	24	−22	15	
6	UDAPB	15	0	2	13	9	29	−20	2	

Updated to match(es) played on 9 November 2013. Source: Príncipe results 2013
Rules for classification: 1) points; 2) goal difference; 3) number of goals scored.

== National final ==
Two national final matches took place on November 13 and 17 at noon, four days apart. The match featured FC Porto Real from Príncipe and UDRA from São Tome Island. Porto Real won the first leg 2-1, the last goal for Porto Real was a penalty kick scored by Joy and UDRA won the second 1-0 and UDRA won the penalty shootouts to become the twelfth and most recent club to win the first title. UDRA was to achieve entry into the 2015 CAF Champions League, the qualification dispute did not brought UDRA to the African competition by the São Tomean Football Federation (FSF)

13 December 2014

FC Porto Real	2:1	UDRA
Jeice Ananias, Joy 73' (pen)		Agi

Estádio 13 de Junho, Santo António
17 December 2014

UDRA	1:0	FC Porto Real
Agi
Penalties
	UDRA won

Estádio Nacional 12 de Julho
São Tomé (city)

Winner

1st title
