= List of football clubs in São Tomé and Príncipe by competitive honours won =

This is a list of the honours won by football clubs in São Tomé and Príncipe. It lists every association football club in São Tomé and Príncipe to have won any of the trophies both at the national and the regional level. Santomean clubs never won any major official African competition.

== Honours table ==
=== National ===
==== Since independence ====
It lists every Santomean association football club to have won any of the major domestic trophies, the São Tomé and Príncipe Championship, the São Tomé and Príncipe Cup and the São Tomé and Príncipe Super Cup.

	Club	Championship	Cup	Super Cup	Total	Last Trophy
1	Sporting Praia Cruz	8	6	5	19	2016 Super Cup
2	Vitória Riboque	5	8	1	14	2011 Super Cup
3	UDRA	2	4	1	7	2017 Cup
4	GD Os Operários	4	2	0	6	2004 Championship
5	Inter Bom-Bom	3	0	1	4	2003 Championship
=	Bairros Unidos FC	2	1	1	4	2001 Championship
=	CD Guadalupe	2	1	1	4	2013 Super Cup
=	6 de Setembro	1	2	1	4	2011 Super Cup
9	Sporting Príncipe	2	1	0	3	2012 Cup
10	Santana FC	1	1	0	2	1991 Cup
11	Andorinha	1	0	0	1	1984 Championship
=	GD Sundy	1	0	0	1	2010 Championship
=	FC Porto Real	0	0	1	1	2017 Super Cup

==== Overall ====
It lists the overall honours won before independence of 1975 and since independence.

	Club	Championship	Cup	Super Cup	Total	Last Trophy
1	Sporting Praia Cruz	8	6	5	19	2016 Super Cup
2	Vitória Riboque	5	8	1	14	2011 Super Cup
3	Andorinha SC	8	3	0	11	1984 Championship
4	UDRA	2	4	1	7	2017 Cup
5	GD Os Operários	4	2	0	6	2004 Championship
6	Inter Bom-Bom	3	0	1	4	2003 Championship
=	Bairros Unidos FC	2	1	1	4	2001 Championship
=	CD Guadalupe	2	1	1	4	2013 Super Cup
=	6 de Setembro	1	2	1	4	2011 Super Cup
10	Sporting São Tomé	3	0	0	3	1971 Championship
=	Sporting Príncipe	2	1	0	3	2012 Cup
12	Santana FC	1	1	0	2	1991 Cup
=	Andorinha	1	0	0	1	1984 Championship
14	Sport Lisboa e São Tomé	1	0	0	1	1939 Championship
=	Sindicato	1	0	0	1	1953 Championship
=	GD Sundy	1	0	0	1	2010 Championship
=	FC Porto Real	0	0	1	1	2017 Super Cup

=== Regional ===
It lists every regional football club to have won any of the minor domestic trophies, the Championship, and the Cup of each of the two islands.

==== Príncipe ====
	Club	Championship	Cup	Total	Last Trophy
1	GD Os Operários	5	3	8	2017 Championship
=	GD Sundy	4	4	8	2013 Cup
3	Sporting Príncipe	4	3	7	2016 Championship
4	FC Porto Real	4	2	6	2017 Cup
5	1º de Maio	1	2	3	2003 Championship
6	UDAPB	1	0	1	2007 Championship

=== São Tomé ===
	Club	Championship	Cup	Total	Last Trophy
1	Sporting Praia Cruz	9	3	12	2016 Championship
2	Vitǒria Riboque	6	5	11	2011 Cup
3	Andorinha	8	0	8	1984 Championship
4	UDRA	2	4	6	2017 Cup
5	CD Guadalupe	2	2	4	2012 Cup
6	Inter Bom-Bom	3	0	3	2003 Championship
=	Bairros Unidos FC	2	1	3	2001 Championship
8	6 de Setembro	1	1	2	2010 Cup
9	Santana FC	1	1	2	1991 Cup
10	UDESCAI	1	1	2	2004 Championship

== See also ==
- List of football clubs by competitive honours won
