= 2013 São Tomé and Príncipe Championship =

São Tomé and Principe Championship
- Season: 2013
- Champions: Sporting Praia Cruz
- Matches: 2

Location of teams in the São Tomé and Príncipe Championship 2013 .

The 2013 São Tomé and Principe Championship was the 28th season of the São Tomé and Principe Championship the top-level football championship of São Tomé and Principe. It began in 13 April and concluded on 16 September. Two national final matches occurred in the season. Sporting Praia Cruz from São Tomé island won their second title.

== Teams ==
16 teams participated in the São Tomé and Principe Championship, 10 from São Tomé Island and 6 from Príncipe Island. At the end of season champion of São Tomé Island League and champion of Principe Island League play one match for champion of São Tomé and Principe.

== São Tomé teams 2013 ==
Location of teams in the São Tomé 2011. Juba Diogo Simão is not mapped here.

Ten clubs participated in the 2013 season (second time since its reduction), the competition began in 13 April and finished on 21 September. 90 matches were played and a total of 268 goals were scored. Sporting Praia Cruz won the title and went on to participate in the national championship match for the seventh time in November. UDRA was second place and UDESCAI and Cruz Vermelha were relegated

=== Teams ===
Club	City	District
Aliança Nacional	Pantufo	Água Grande
Bairros Unidos FC	Caixão Grande	Mé-Zóchi
Cruz Vermelha	Almeirim	Água Grande
CD Guadalupe (Newly Promoted)	Guadalupe	Lobata
Juba Diogo Simão (Newly Promoted)	Diogo Simão	
Oque d'El Rei	Oque d’El Rei	Água Grande
Sporting Praia Cruz	São Tomé	Água Grande
UDESCAI	Água Izé	Cantagalo
UDRA	São João dos Angolares	Caué
Vitória FC	São Tomé	Água Grande

=== League table ===
Pos	Team	Pld	W	D	L	GF	GA	GD	Pts	Qualification or relegation
1	Sporting Praia Cruz	18	14	4	0	56	8	+48	46	Qualification for 2013 São Tomé and Principe Championship
2	UDRA	18	12	5	1	37	14	+23	41	
3	Vitória FC (Riboque)	18	9	4	5	24	20	+4	31	
4	Bairros Unidos FC	18	8	5	5	30	20	+10	29	
5	Desportivo de Oque d'El Rei	18	6	2	10	19	28	−9	20	
6	Desportivo de Guadalupe	18	6	2	10	19	33	−14	20	
7	Juba Diogo Simão	18	4	5	9	27	37	−10	17	
8	Aliança Nacional	18	5	3	10	26	23	+3	18	
9	UDESCAI (R)	18	4	3	11	20	40	−20	15	Relegation to São Tomé Championship 2 division
10	Cruz Vermelha (R)	18	2	1	15	12	45	−33	7	Relegation to São Tomé Championship 2 division

Updated to match(es) played on 9 November 2013. Source: São Tomé results 2013
Rules for classification: 1) points; 2) goal difference; 3) number of goals scored.
(R) Relegated

== Principe teams 2013 ==
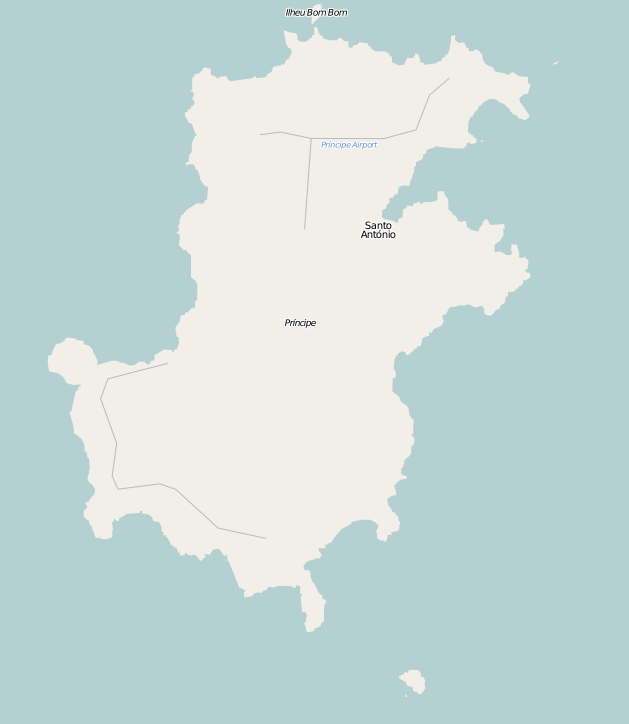
Location of teams in the Principe 2013. FC Porto Real is not mapped here.

Six clubs took part, FC Porto Real returned to the competition due to that the club was suspended for a season. The competition started on 17 May and finished on 2 November with four intervals and three for some other club. FC Porto Real won the 2013 title and participated in the national championship match in November.

Club	City	District
1º de Maio	Santo António	Pagué
GD Os Operários	Santo António	Pagué
FC Porto Real	Porto Real	Pagué
Sporting Clube do Príncipe	Santo António	Pagué
GD Sundy (Current champions)	Sundy	Pagué
UDAPB	Picão	Pagué

=== League table ===
Pos	Team	Pld	W	D	L	GF	GA	GD	Pts	Qualification
1	FC Porto Real	20	12	6	2	34	18	+16	42	Qualification for 2013 São Tomé and Principe Championship
2	Sporting Clube do Príncipe	20	11	5	4	29	21	+8	38	
3	GD Sundy	17	8	4	5	23	18	+5	28	
4	GS Os Operários	16	5	4	7	21	28	−7	19	
5	1o de Maio	16	4	3	9	2	24	−22	15	
6	UDAPB	15	0	2	13	9	29	−20	2	

Updated to match(es) played on 9 November 2013. Source: Príncipe results 2013
Rules for classification: 1) points; 2) goal difference; 3) number of goals scored.

== National final ==
Two national final matches took place on November 9 and 16 at noon. The match featured FC Porto Real from Príncipe and Sporting Praia Cruz. Every goal were scored in the last few minutes of the match. Sporting Praia Cruz won 0-2 in the first leg, all goals were scored by Jujú at the 30th and the 53rd minute. Sporting Praia Cruz won the second leg, Pinguinho scored at the 17th minute and Naí at the 43rd minute, the last goal was scored at the second half, a penalty kick was scored at the 73rd minute by Jair and the club won all two legs and claimed the sixth national title and achieved entry into the 2014 CAF Champions League. There was some problem by the São Tomean Football Federation (FSF) that the sorting was approved by the CAF before the start of the dispute. USM El Harrach was excluded from the competition

9 November 2013

FC Porto Real	0:2	Sporting Praia Cruz
		Jujú 30' 53'

Estádio 13 de Junho
Santo António
16 November 2013

Sporting Praia Cruz	3:0	FC Porto Real
Pingunho 17', Naí 43', Jair 73' (pen)

Estádio Nacional 12 de Julho
São Tomé (city)

Winner

6th title
