= 2012 São Tomé First Division =

São Tomé First Division
- Season: 2011
- Champions: Vitória FC (Riboque)
- Promoted: Vitória FC (Riboque)
- Relegated: CD Guadalupe; FC Neves; FC Ribeira Peixe; Santana FC
- Matches: 90
- Goals: 263 (2.92 per match)

The 2012 São Tomé (Island or Regional) First Division took place that season. The club was reduced to 10 clubs and appeared in that number until late 2015, the competition began in May and finished in October. Geographically all clubs that took part in the Premier Division were in the east and those in the west were relegated last season. In the first week, Sporting Praia Cruz won the first two matches, two match draws were made in around week 15. Sporting Praia Cruz won the title and went on to participate in the national championship match for the sixth time in November. A total of 90 matches were played, and 263 goals were scored. Sporting Praia Cruz won the season's title after finishing with 48 points and participated in the 2012 National Championship later in the year.

== Overview ==
Agrosport of Group A and Aliança Nacional of Group B were promoted into the Premier Division from the Second.

For just a season, Agrosport was relegated as they were placed 9th, also relegated was last placed 6 de Setembro, the two clubs participated in the regional Second Division in the following season. Agrosport did not return to the Premier Division until 2016 and 6 de Setembro will be returning to the Premier Division in 2018.

Sporting Praia Cruz scored the most goals numbering 40, second was Bairros Unidos with 31, 3rd was UDRA with 28 and fourth was 8th placed Aliança Nacional with 26. UDESCAI scored the least with 13, the second least was Vitória Riboque with 23 and third least were Cruz Vermelha and Oque del Rei with 24.. On the opposites, both Agrosport and 6 de Setembro conceded the most with 39, followed by Oque del Rei with 31 and UDRA with 26, Sporting Praia conceded the least with 12, second was Vitória Riboque with 18.

== Teams ==
Location of teams in the São Tomé 2012.

Club	City	District
Agrosport (Newly Promoted)	Monte Café	Mé-Zóchi
Aliança Nacional (Newly Promoted)	Pantufo	Água Grande
Bairros Unidos FC	Caixão Grande	Mé-Zóchi
Cruz Vermelha	Almeirim	Água Grande
Oque d'El Rei	Oque d’El Rei	Água Grande
6 de Setembro	São Tomé	Água Grande
Sporting Praia Cruz	São Tomé	Água Grande
UDESCAI	Água Izé	Cantagalo
UDRA	São João dos Angolares	Caué
Vitória FC	São Tomé	Água Grande

=== League table ===
Pos	Team	Pld	W	D	L	GF	GA	GD	Pts	Qualification or relegation
1	Sporting Praia Cruz	18	16	0	2	40	12	+28	48	Qualification for 2012 São Tomé and Principe Championship
2	Bairros Unidos FC	18	10	3	5	31	21	+10	33	
3	UDRA	18	10	2	6	28	26	+2	32	
4	Vitória FC (Riboque)	18	8	3	7	23	18	+5	27	
5	Cruz Vermelha	18	6	6	6	24	22	+2	24	
6	Oque d'El Rei	18	4	7	7	24	31	−7	19	
7	UDESCAI	18	4	7	7	13	22	−9	19	
8	Aliança Nacional	18	5	3	10	26	23	+3	18	
9	Agrosport (R)	18	5	2	11	25	39	−14	17	Relegation to São Tomé Championship 2 division
10	6 de Setembro (R)	18	4	3	11	29	39	−10	15	Relegation to São Tomé Championship 2 division

Updated to match(es) played on 19 November 2012. Source: São Tomé results 2012
Rules for classification: 1) points; 2) goal difference; 3) number of goals scored.
(R) Relegated

São Tomé First Division 2012
champions

7th title
