= 2017 São Tomé and Príncipe Championship =

São Tomé and Principe Championship
- Season: 2017
- Champions: UDRA (2nd title)
- Matches: 2
- Goals: 5−1 (4.5 per match)

Location of teams in the São Tomé and Príncipe Championship 2016.

The 2017 São Tomé and Principe Championship was the 32nd season of the São Tomé and Principe Championship the top-level football championship of São Tomé and Principe.

There are two separate championships, one for teams of São Tomé Island and one for teams of Príncipe Island. The champions of the two island championships play a home-and-away two-legged final to decide the overall champions.

== São Tomé teams 2017 ==
=== Third Division ===
Location of teams in the 2014 São Tomé Third (Honour) Division.

The third division featured 10 clubs.

Club	City	District
Andorinha	Ponta Mina, São Tomé	Água Grande
Conde		
Cruz Vermelha	Almeirim	Água Grande
Diogo Vaz	Diogo Vaz	
Juba Diogo Simão ('Relegated and Withdrawn)	Diogo Simão	
Micoló (Relegated)	Micoló	Lobata
Ototó	Ototó	
Porto Alegre (Note: Also as Benfica de Porto Alegre) (Relegated)	Porto Alegre	Caué
Santa Margarida	Santa Margarida	
Varzim FC	Ribeira Afonso	

==== Final table ====
Pos	Team	Pld	W	D	L	GF	GA	GD	Pts	Promotion
1	Otótó	16	10	4	2	39	18	+21	34 (Note: missing goals for round 6) (Note: missing goals for round 16)	Promoted
2	GD Cruz Vermelha	16	9	3	4	29	20	+9	30	Promoted
3	Marítimo de Micoló	16	8	4	4	20	17	+3	28 (Note: missing goals for round 9)	
4	Andorinha	16	5	6	5	24	20	+4	21	
5	Conde	15	5	4	6	19	15	+4	19	
6	Diogo Vaz	15	5	4	6	19	30	−11	19	
7	Santa Margarida	16	5	3	8	25	23	+2	18	
8	Porto Alegre	16	3	5	8	12	27	−15	14	
9	Varzim (Rib. Afonso)	16	4	1	11	20	37	−17	13	

Notes:

-.Juba de Diogo Simão withdrew

Both Ototó (1st) and Cruz Vermelha (2nd) will be promoted into the Second Division in the following season.

== Príncipe Championship ==
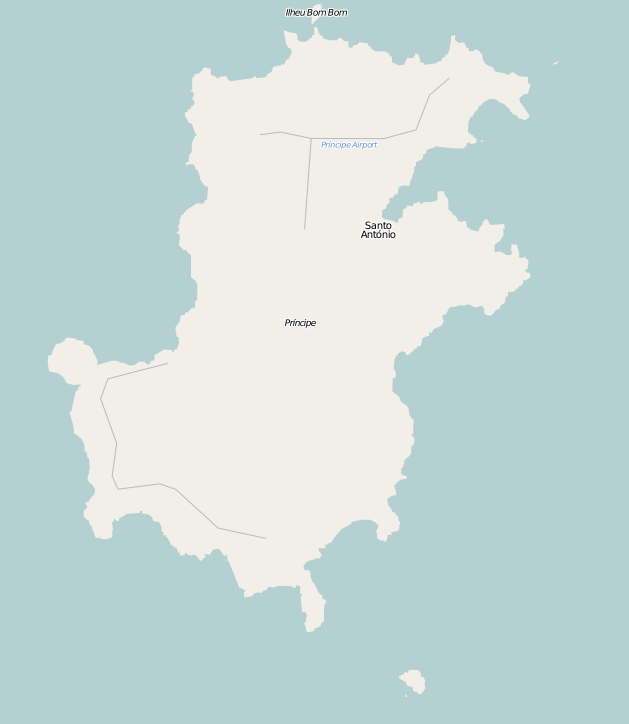
Location of teams in the Principe 2013. FC Porto Real is not mapped here.

A total of 6 teams participate in the Príncipe Island League. Os Operários won their championship title for Príncipe and qualified into the national championship matches.

Club	City	District
1º de Maio	Santo António	Pagué
GD Os Operários	Santo António	Pagué
FC Porto Real	Porto Real	Pagué
Sporting Clube do Príncipe (Current champions)	Santo António	Pagué
GD Sundy	Sundy	Pagué
UDAPB	Picão	Pagué

=== Final table ===
Pos	Team	Pld	W	D	L	GF	GA	GD	Pts	Qualification
1	Operários	20	14	4	2	60	18	+42	46	Qualified
2	Porto Real	20	12	6	2	74	19	+55	42	
3	Sporting	20	11	2	7	58	39	+19	35	
4	UDAPB	20	8	1	11	38	54	−16	25	
5	1º de Maio	20	4	2	14	32	70	−38	14	
6	Sundy	20	3	1	16	25	87	−62	10	

== National final ==
The two match finals took place. on 19 and 26 November. The qualified teams were:

- Champions of São Tomé: UDRA
- Champions of Príncipe: Os Operários

UDRA won all two legs, first 2-0 in São Tomé Island, then 1-3 in Príncipe and UDRA won their second national championship title. By district, Caué's total honours won in the championships also became two, superseded Cantagalo's single title and became third out of fifth, tied with Lobata, all won by Desportivo de Guadalupe.

Also UDRA became entrant into the national super cup and qualify as champion.

=== Results ===
First Leg [Nov 19, Estádio Nacional 12 de Julho, São Tomé]

UDRA 2-0 Operários

[Janine 34, 37]

Second Leg [Nov 26, Estádio Regional 13 de Junho, Santo António]

Operários 1-3 UDRA

[Cáte 22; Tavarinho 7, Janine 54, Vando 56]
