= 2016 São Tomé First Division =

São Tomé First Division
- Season: 2016
- Champions: Sporting Praia Cruz
- Promoted: Agrosport; Trindade FC; Inter Bom-Bom; Kê Morabeza
- Relegated: Santana FC; Kê Morabeza
- Matches played: 132
- Goals scored: 362 (2.74 per match)

The 2016 São Tomé (Island or Regional) First Division took place that season. The club was the next in a few seasons that had 12 clubs. the competition began in 21 May and finished on 7 December. Geographically all clubs that took part in the Premier Division were in the east and almost all but UDRA were in the northeast where the regional and national capital is located. Sporting Praia Cruz won their 8th and recent title. A total of 132 matches were played and 362 goals were scored, more than half than last season.

== Overview ==
Kê Morabeza and Santana FC were relegated from the Premier Division as they finished in the last two positions. Nevs and UDESCAI were champions of the Second Division and were promoted into the division for the following season.

Both Sporting Praia Cruz and Bairros Unidos scored the most goals numbering 45, third was UDRA with 43, and fourth was Aliança Nacional with 33. On the opposites, Kė Morabeza conceded the most with 56 and second was Correia with 49.

== Teams ==
Location of teams in the São Tomé Premier Division of 2016.

Club	City	District
Agrosport (Newly Promoted)	Monte Café	Mé-Zóchi
Aliança Nacional	Pantufo	Água Grande
Bairros Unidos FC	Caixão Grande	Mé-Zóchi
UD Correia	Correia	Lobata
Porto de Folha Fede	Folha Fede	Mé-Zóchi
Inter Bom-Bom (Newly Promoted)	Bom-Bom	Mé-Zóchi
Desportivo Kê Morabeza (Newly promoted)		
Santana FC	Santana	Cantagalo
Sporting Praia Cruz (Current champions)	São Tomé	Água Grande
Trindade (Newly Promoted)	Trindade	Mé-Zóchi
UDRA	São João dos Angolares	Caué
Vitória FC	Riboque, São Tomé	Água Grande

=== Championship table ===
Pos	Team	Pld	W	D	L	GF	GA	GD	Pts	Qualification or relegation
1	Sporting Praia Cruz	22	17	2	3	45	16	+29	53	Qualification for 2016 São Tomé and Principe Championship
2	Caixão Grande	22	13	4	5	45	26	+19	43	
3	Aliança Nacional	22	11	8	3	33	20	+13	41	
4	Vitória	22	10	8	4	23	17	+6	38	
5	UDRA	22	9	6	7	43	24	+19	33	
6	Trindade FC	22	8	9	5	29	23	+6	33	
7	Inter Bom Bom	22	5	4	13	32	39	−7	19	
8	Agrosport	22	7	7	8	27	24	+3	28	
9	Folha Fede (Note: Also known as Porto Folha Fede)	22	5	4	13	32	39	−7	19	
10	UD Correia	22	4	5	13	22	49	−27	17	
11	Santana FC (R)	22	4	5	13	25	42	−17	17	Relegation to São Tomé Island Second Division
12	Kê Morabeza (R)	22	2	3	17	17	56	−39	9	Relegation to São Tomé Island Second Division

Updated to match(es) played on 7 December 2016. Source: São Tomé results 2016
Rules for classification: 1) points; 2) goal difference; 3) number of goals scored.
(R) Relegated

=== Statistics ===
- Highest scoring match: UDRA 8-0 UD Correia (24 July at the 7th Round)

São Tomé First Division 2015
champions
Sporting Praia Cruz
8th title
