= Football in São Tomé and Príncipe =

- Country: São Tomé and Príncipe
- Governing body: São Toméan Football Federation
- National team: men's national team

National competitions
- Taça Nacional de São Tomé e Príncipe

Club competitions
- São Tomé and Príncipe Championship; Príncipe Island League

International competitions
- Champions League; CAF Confederation Cup; Super Cup; FIFA Club World Cup; FIFA World Cup(National Team); African Cup of Nations(National Team)

The sport of football in the country of São Tomé and Príncipe is run by the São Toméan Football Federation. The association administers the national football team, as well as the São Tomé and Príncipe Championship. Association football is the most popular sport in São Tomé and Príncipe.

== History ==
Football (soccer) was brought around the beginning of the 20th century during Portuguese rule, later in the 1930s, it held its first provincial championship and continued up to 1974, before the nation became independent. That time, football was the only sport in the nation played.

Since 1977, the São Toméan Football Federation has been organizing the national championships, Campeonato Santomense de Futebol. Also during that time when Príncipe did not have its island competition, the island championship was also the national championships until 1985. That continued from 1986 to 1988, 1991, 1992 and from 1994 to 1997.

Since 2013 the winner of the São Tomé Primeira Divisão (São Tomé) has competed against the winner of the Príncipe Island League. Previously the Landessieger was determined in only one finals game. On Príncipe six clubs of the island play in the first Inselliga, of which the last placed in the second division, the Segunda Divisão descends. On the much larger island of São Tomé, the FSF maintains three game levels. Ten clubs play there in the top flight, the Primeira Divisão. This is followed by a second league, the Segunda Divisão, with ten clubs. The bottom level represents the third league, the Terceira Divisão, which is divided into two groups of five teams each. From 2012 to 2015, ten clubs competed in the Premier Division.

The Campeonato Santomense is the club Sporting Clube Praia Cruz with 6 titles followed by Vitória Futebol Clube de Riboque with 5 championships (as of 2014). For the first time, UDRA de Angolares won the 2014 national championship. They won the double for the first time with his 2014 second consecutive victory of the national cup. Recently Sporting Praia Cruz won two straight titles in 2016.

Football is still the most popular sport today, it dominates most or much of the sports popularity in the nation, more than basketball and volleyball. Another sport known as futsal is non-existent in the country.

In various individual years the championship was suspended, as a result of politically unstable situations in the country or financial distress of the association. So far the title went 22 times to clubs from São Tomé, seven titles went to the island Príncipe.

=== Cup competitions ===
The Taça Nacional de São Tomé e Príncipe is first held on the two main islands. The two winners of each main island determine the trophy in a final. The record holder is eight Vitória Riboque cups. From its foundation in 1977 to the early 1990s, the national level was the only competition, from that time, Príncipe held its own cup competition and qualified to the quarterfinals of the cup competition. From 2001, São Tomé's own cup competition was established and the national competition reduced to two matches.

== National team ==
The São Tomé and Príncipe national team has been one of the weakest in Africa and, having been inactive between 2003 and 2011, was at one point no longer included in the FIFA World Rankings. In 2011 the national team made a comeback, even beating Lesotho in a two-leg play-off in the 2013 Africa Cup of Nations qualification before being eliminated by Sierra Leone.

== Club football ==
The São Tomé and Príncipe Championship is the country's top competition, with Sporting Praia Cruz and Vitória FC (Riboque) its most successful clubs. It is not however a league in the conventional sense but rather is decided by a play-off between the winners of the São Tomé Island League and the Príncipe Island League. Like Cape Verde further to the northwest in the Atlantic, they are the only two countries in Africa where only the title of each national subdivision spends only a year in the competition and being the few remaining nations to do so. Unlike Cape Verde, it may be the only remaining nation that the national championship consists just the knockout phase and also just the finals match.

A national cup, the Taça Nacional de São Tomé e Príncipe, is also contested irregularly and also the Super Cup where the champion and a cup winner (sometimes a cup runner-up if a champion is also a cup winner) competes once a year.

== League system ==
Level	League(s)/Division(s)	
1	São Tomé Primeira Divisão; 12 clubs	Príncipe Island League; 6 clubs
2	São Tomé Segunda Divisão; 10 clubs	
3	São Tomé Terceira Divisão; 10 clubs	

== Stadiums in São Tomé and Príncipe ==
Stadium	Capacity	City
Estádio Nacional 12 de Julho	6,500	São Tomé

Other venues:

Príncipe

- Estádio 13 de Julho - Santo António
- Campo de Futebol de Santo António
- Campo de Sundy - Sundy

São Tomé Island

- Campo dos Lobatos - Guadalupe
- Estadio Mé-Zóchi, Bom-Bom
- Campo de Pantufo - Pantufo
- Campo de Futebol de Santana
- Campo de Santo Amaro - Oque del Rei
- Campo de Diogo Simão, Diogo Simão

== Women's Football ==
Since 2002 a single national championship has been held in São Tomé and Príncipe. The first league, the Campeonato Nacional de Futebol Feminino, comprises 10 teams.

The São Tomé football national team of women has not yet qualified for any international competition. In 2010, the São Tomés team was ranked 59th in the FIFA Women's World Cup.
