= 2011 São Tomé First Division =

São Tomé First Division
- Season: 2011
- Champions: Vitória FC (Riboque)
- Promoted: Vitória FC (Riboque)
- Relegated: CD Guadalupe; FC Neves; FC Ribeira Peixe; Santana FC
- Matches: 126
- Goals: 313 (2.48 per match)

The 2011 São Tomé (Island or Regional) First Division took place that season. The club had 12 clubs and not until 2016 when they had 12 clubs again, 10 clubs appeared for the next few seasons. A total of 126 matches were played and 313 goals were scored. Vitória Riboque won the season's title after finishing with 47 points and participated in the 2011 National Championship later in the year.

== Overview ==
Neves and Ribeira Peixe were promoted into the Premier Division from the Second and spent only a season.

Guadalupe, Neves, Ribeira Peixe and Santana were relegated and participated in the regional Second Division in the following season. Guadalupe did not return to the Premier Division until 2013 and Neves and Santana until 2014.

Sporting Praia Cruz scored the most goals numbering 41, second was 6 de Setembro with 39, 3rd was Vitória Riboque with 35 and fourth was UDRA with 31. Santana scored the least with 15, the second least was UDESCAI with 16 and Ribeira Peixe with 17. On the opposites, Ribeira Peixe conceded the most with 48, followed by Santana with 47 and Neves with 37, Vitória Riboque conceded the least with 15 and Oque del Rei the second least with 16.

Between July 10 and August 14, there were no competitions due to the first (17 July) and second (7 August) rounds of the presidential elections that took place in the country, the 25 July one due to the regional cup competition that took place.

== Teams ==
Location of teams in the São Tomé 2011 .

Club	City	District
Bairros Unidos FC	Caixão Grande	Mé-Zóchi
Cruz Vermelha	Almeirim	Água Grande
CD Guadalupe	Guadalupe	Lobata
FC Neves (Newly Promoted)	Neves	Lembá
Oque d'El Rei	Oque del Rei	Água Grande
FC Ribeira Peixe (Newly Promoted)	Ribeira Peixe	Caué
Santana FC	Santana	Cantagalo
6 de Setembro	São Tomé	Água Grande
Sporting Praia Cruz	São Tomé	Água Grande
UDESCAI	Água Izé	Cantagalo
UDRA	São João dos Angolares	Caué
Vitória FC	São Tomé	Água Grande

== League table ==
Pos	Team	Pld	W	D	L	GF	GA	GD	Pts	Qualification or relegation
1	Vitória FC (Riboque)	21	15	2	4	35	15	+20	47	Qualification for 2011 São Tomé and Principe Championship
2	Sporting Praia Cruz	21	12	4	5	41	23	+18	40	
3	6 de Setembro	21	11	6	4	39	19	+20	39	
4	UDRA	21	10	4	7	31	18	+13	34	
5	UDESCAI	21	9	5	7	16	18	−2	32	
6	CD Oque d'El Rei	21	8	6	7	25	16	+9	30	
7	Bairros Unidos FC	21	7	8	6	25	22	+3	29	
8	GD Cruz Vermelha	21	8	5	8	25	28	−3	29	
9	CD Guadalupe (R)	21	6	8	7	20	25	−5	26	Relegation to São Tomé Championship 2 division
10	FC Neves (R)	21	3	8	10	24	37	−13	17	Relegation to São Tomé Championship 2 division
11	FC Ribeira Peixe (R)	21	3	5	13	17	48	−31	14	Relegation to São Tomé Championship 2 division
12	Santana FC (R)	21	2	3	16	15	44	−29	9	Relegation to São Tomé Championship 2 division

Updated to match(es) played on 19 November 2011. Source: São Tomé results 2011
Rules for classification: 1) points; 2) goal difference; 3) number of goals scored.
(R) Relegated

São Tomé First Division 2011
champions

7th title
