= 2016 São Tomé and Príncipe Championship =

São Tomé and Principe Championship
- Season: 2016
- Champions: Sporting Praia Cruz
- Matches: 2
- Goals: 7 (3.5 per match)

Location of teams in the São Tomé and Príncipe Championship 2016.

The 2016 São Tomé and Principe Championship was the 31st season of the São Tomé and Principe Championship the top-level football championship of São Tomé and Principe. It began on 21 May, a day earlier than last season and concluded on 21 December. Two national final matches occurred in the season. Sporting Praia Cruz from São Tomé island won their seventh and recent title.

== Teams ==
38 teams participated in the São Tomé and Principe Championship, 32 from São Tomé Island (12 in the Premier Division, 10 in the lower two divisions) and 6 from Príncipe Island. Only two clubs were absent which would total 40. At the end of season champion of São Tomé Island League and champion of Principe Island League play one match for champion of São Tomé and Principe.

== Principe teams 2016 ==
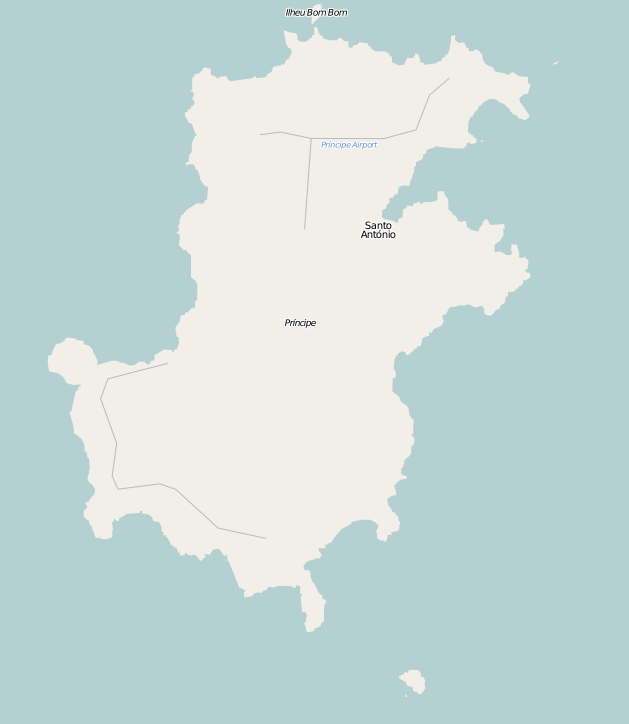
Location of teams in the Principe 2013. FC Porto Real is not mapped here.

Six clubs took part in the 2016 season. Sporting Príncipe won the title again and participated in the national championship match in December. The season started on 10 June and finished on 20 November. A total of 222 goals were scored.

Club	City	District
1º de Maio	Santo António	Pagué
GD Os Operários	Santo António	Pagué
FC Porto Real	Porto Real	Pagué
Sporting Clube do Príncipe (Current champions)	Santo António	Pagué
GD Sundy	Sundy	Pagué
UDAPB	Picão	Pagué

=== Final table ===
Pos	Team	Pld	W	D	L	GF	GA	GD	Pts	Qualification
1	Sporting	20	13	3	4	53	23	+30	42	Champions
2	Porto Real	20	13	2	5	46	23	+23	41	Runner-up
3	Operários	20	13	2	5	43	30	+13	41	
4	Sundy	20	6	5	9	30	35	−5	23	
5	1º de Maio	20	6	1	13	30	55	−25	19	
6	UDAPB	20	1	3	16	20	56	−36	6	

=== Statistics ===
- Highest scoring match: FC Porto Real 8 - 1 1º de Maio

== National final ==
Two national final matches took place on December 14 and 20 at noon. Once again, it was another "Sporting" competition as the match featured Sporting Príncipe from Príncipe and Sporting Praia Cruz from São Tome Island. The matches took place later than the previous season. Unusual, like in North American leagues, the club played at the stadium of the last listed club instead of the first listed.

Sporting Praia Cruz won the first leg 2-1 while a two-goal draw were made by two clubs. With a total of four goals scored, Sporting Praia Cruz would go on the win their eight and recent national title, also it was their second straight.

Neither clubs participated into the 2017 CAF Champions League.

14 December 2015
12:00 (UTC+1)

Sporting Praia Cruz	2-1	Sporting Príncipe

Campo de Sundy, Sundy
20 December 2016
12:00 (UTC+1)

Sporting Príncipe	2-2	Sporting Praia Cruz

Estádio Nacional 12 de Julho
São Tomé (city)

2016 São Tomé and Príncipe Championship
champions

8th title
