= 2015 São Tomé and Príncipe Championship =

São Tomé and Principe Championship
- Season: 2015
- Champions: Sporting Praia Cruz
- Matches: 2

Location of teams in the São Tomé and Príncipe Championship 2015.

The 2015 São Tomé and Principe Championship was the 30th season of the São Tomé and Principe Championship the top-level football championship of São Tomé and Principe. It began on 9 May, a day earlier than last season and concluded on 21 November. Two national final matches occurred in the season. Sporting Praia Cruz from São Tomé island won their seventh and recent title.

== Teams ==
35 teams participated in the São Tomé and Principe Championship, 30 from São Tomé Island (10 in each division) and 5 from Príncipe Island. At the end of season champion of São Tomé Island League and champion of Principe Island League play one match for champion of São Tomé and Principe.

== Principe teams 2015 ==
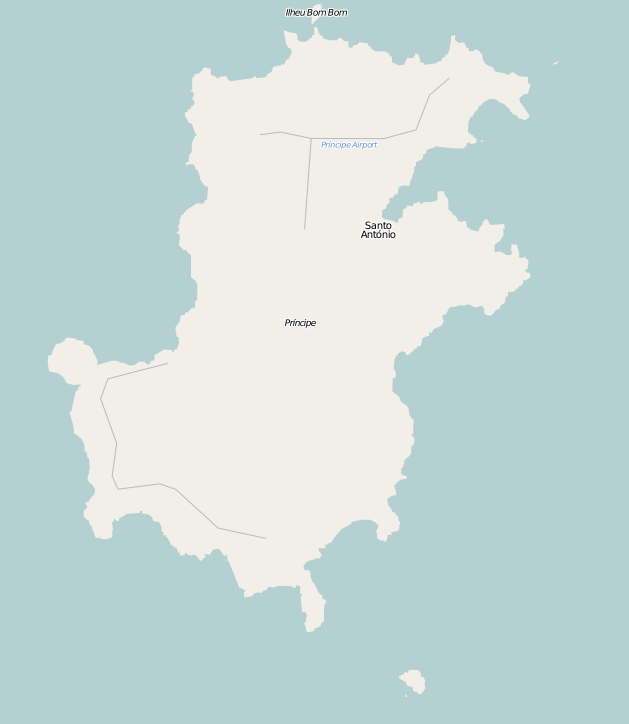
Location of teams in the Principe 2013. FC Porto Real is not mapped here.

Five clubs took part in the 2014 season. One of the clubs did not participate in the season. Sporting Príncipe won the title and participated in the national championship match in November.

Club	City	District
1º de Maio	Santo António	Pagué
GD Os Operários	Santo António	Pagué
FC Porto Real (Current champions)	Porto Real	Pagué
Sporting Clube do Príncipe	Santo António	Pagué
GD Sundy	Sundy	Pagué
UDAPB	Picão	Pagué

=== Final table ===
Pos	Team	Pld	W	D	L	GF	GA	GD	Pts	Qualification
1	Sporting	20	12	0	8	34	23	+11	36 (Note: missing goals 2 matches)	Campeonato Nacional
2	Operários	20	9	6	5	25	20	+5	33 (Note: missing goals 4 matches)	
3	UDAPB	20	8	7	5	27	28	−1	31	
4	Porto Real	20	8	4	8	26	23	+3	28 (Note: missing goals 3 matches)	
5	1º de Maio	20	6	3	11	31	37	−6	21	
6	Sundy	20	5	4	11	14	26	−12	19	

== National final ==
Two national final matches took place on November 15 and 21 at noon. It was another "Sporting" competition as the match featured Sporting Príncipe from Príncipe and Sporting Praia Cruz from São Tome Island.

Sporting Praia Cruz won the first leg 4–2 while Sporting Príncipe won the second leg 2–1. In the first leg, Sporting Príncipe started to lead at the 15th minute after a goal was scored by Arthur, at the 38th minute, Sporting Praia Cruz tied it by Jair and lasted for less than two minutes as Zé changed the lead position to Sporting Praia Cruz at the 40th minute. Inside the second half, once again the match was tied at 2 as Tó scored the half's first goal at the 46th minute. Sporting Praia Cruz kept the lead for the rest of the match, Zé scored his second goal of the match at the 65th minute, in the last few minutes of the match, Jaty scored the fourth goal at the 87th minute. In the second leg, Sporting Príncipe took the lead as Abel scored the match's first goal at the 46th minute, in the second half, a penalty kick was scored at the 73rd minute by Maiê and for approximately seventeen minutes, the total goals of two matches were tied at four. This would change as Sporting Praia Cruz scored the match's only goal at the 90th minute by Jaty and kept the championship hope throughout the remainder of the match. With a total of five goals scored, Sporting Praia Cruz would go on the win their seventh and recent national title.

Sporting Praia Cruz will participate into the 2016 CAF Champions League in the preliminaries in February.

15 November 25
12:00 (UTC+1)

Sporting Praia Cruz	4:2	Sporting Príncipe
Jair 38', Zé 40', 65', Jaty 87'		Artur 15', Tó 46'

Estádio 13 de Junho, Santo António
21 November 2015
12:00 (UTC+1)

Sporting Príncipe	2:1	Sporting Praia Cruz
Abel 46, Maiê 73' (pen.)		Jaty 90'
Penalties
	UDRA won

Estádio Nacional 12 de Julho
São Tomé (city)

Winner

7th title
