= Taça Regional de Príncipe =

Príncipe Cup
- Founded: 1998
- Region: Príncipe, São Tomé and Príncipe
- Teams: 32
- Current champions: Porto Real (3rd time)
- Most championships: GD Sundy (4 titles)

Taça Regional de Príncipe, literally the Príncipe Regional Cup is the regional association football knockout tournament of the island of São Tomé, it was created in 1998. The winner competes with the São Tomé Cup winner in the São Tomé and Príncipe Cup. All of its finals matches are played at Estádio 13 de Julho at the furthermost area of the island capital. FC Porto Real is the current cup winner which won the 2017 title.

== History ==
From 1981 to 1984, the regional cup was also the national cup as Príncipe did not have its own cup competition at the time as well as from 1988 to 1989 and 1992.

From 1998 to 2000, the regional cup winner of the island was placed in the semis. Since 2001, the cup winner competes in a single national cup match.

== Title history ==
The first cup winner was 1º de Maio who won the first edition, the second winner was Os Operários which was in 1999, Sundy was the third winner in 2001. Os Operários won their second title and was the only club to have more than a title in 2003 which lasted until 2007 as Sundy became the second to win a second title and shared it. Sporting Príncipe became the fourth club to win a title in 2010 and had the fewest titles that season. Sundy became the club with the most regional cup titles in 2011, Sporting won in 2012 and shared it with Os Operários as the second most titles in 2013, Sporting became second with their third title in 2013. Porto Real was the fifth and recent club to win a title leaving UDAPB the only club without any cup titles. Os Operários' title total was third until 2016 as then won their last cup title and is currently shared with Sporting. Porto Real and 1º de Maio were fourth and last in title count with only one title, it changed in September 2017 with Porto Real winning their second and recent cup title, 1º de Maio's cup total is now fifth and last.

== Previous winners ==
Year	Winners	Score	Runners-up
1998	1º de Maio		
1999	GD Os Operários		
2001	GD Sundy		
2002	no competition		
2003	GD Os Operários		
2004	No competition		
2005	No competition		
2006	No competition		
2007	GD Sundy		
2008	no competition		
2009 & 2010	Sporting Clube do Príncipe		
2011	GD Sundy		
2012	Sporting Clube do Príncipe		
2013	GD Sundy		
2014	Sporting Clube do Príncipe		
2015	Porto Real		
2016	GD Os Operários	1–0	Sporting Príncipe
2017	Porto Real	3–2	UDAPB
2018	Porto Real	3–0	GD Sundy

=== Performance By Club ===
Club	Winners	Winning years
GD Sundy	4	2001, 2007, 2011, 2013
GD Os Operários	3	1999, 2013, 2016
Sporting Clube do Príncipe	3	2009-10, 2012, 2014
Porto Real	3	2015, 2017, 2018
1º de Maio	1	1998

=== Performance by area ===
Club	Winners	Winning years
Santo António	6	1999, 2009–10, 2012, 2013, 2014, 2016
Sundy	4	2001, 2007, 2011, 2013
Porto Real	3	2015, 2017, 2018
Novo Estrela	1	1998
