= Agrosport =

São Toméan football club

Agrosport Agro Sport
- Full name: Agrosport Clube de Monte Café
- Founded: 1990
- Ground: Monte Café, Mé-Zóchi, São Tomé and Príncipe
- Capacity: 6,500
- Chairman: Rosalvo Eustáquio
- Manager: Bonifácio Matoso
- League: São Tomé and Príncipe Championship
- 2025: 7th
| Home colours | Away colours |

Agrosport de Monte Café is a football club that plays in the São Tomé Island League Second Division. The team is based Monte Café in the southern part of the island of São Tomé. The team is mainly for fans that are from the rural parts of the country. The team never claimed any national, insular and cup titles.

== History ==
The club was founded in 1990 and participated in the second division, in 2003, the club played in the island cup and advanced up to the first round, the club lost to Marítimo Micoló 6–7, The club entered the island first division in 2004 and returned to the second division after being relegated, the club again appeared in the first division in 2012 but was relegated to the second where the club currently plays today. The club celebrated its 25th year of foundation in 2015.

Agrosport's first match of the 2017 season was a three-goal draw with UDESCAI, the position was rough and was on a verge on being relegated, instead, Agrisport was relieved with a 3–2 victory over UDESCAI and threw that club into the Second Division, a four-goal draw with Praia Cruz was made in the season's last match, Agrosport finished tenth behind Inter Bom-Bom and ahead of UD Correia and UDESCAI and remains to be a First Division club for the following season.

Agrosport played their first cup match of the island on 12 May 2018, they met with Benfica Porto Alegre and made a huge 9–1 win, one of the highest in Agrosport's history, and will advance into the Second Round in a couple of weeks.

== Logo and uniform ==
Its logo are colored green with a large letter A in the middle and a crane on the left and carrying the foundation year on the right.

== League and cup history ==
=== Island championships ===
| Season | Div. | Pos. | Pl. | W | D | L | GS | GA | GD | P | Cup | Qualification/relegation |
|---|---|---|---|---|---|---|---|---|---|---|---|---|
| 2011 | 3 | | - | - | - | - | - | - | - | - | | None |
| 2012 | 2 | 9 | 18 | 5 | 2 | 11 | 25 | 39 | -14 | 17 | | Relegated into the island second division |
| 2013 | 3 | | 18 | - | - | - | - | - | - | - | | None |
| 2015 | 2 | 1 | 18 | - | - | - | - | - | - | - | | Promoted to the Regional Premier Division |
| 2016 | 2 | 8 | 18 | 7 | 7 | 8 | 27 | 24 | +3 | 28 | | |
| 2017 | 2 | 10 | 22 | 6 | 4 | 12 | 31 | 41 | -10 | 2 | | |
