= Adriano Eusébio =

Santomean footballer and manager

Personal information
- Date of birth: 1 January 1966 (age 60)
- Place of birth: Trindade, São Tomé and Príncipe

Senior career*
Years	Team	Apps	(Gls)
- Bairros Unidos
- Guadalupe

Managerial career
- 2011–2012: Bairros Unidos
- 2014–2017: Praia Cruz
- 2017–2018: Vitória Riboque
- 2019–2020: São Tomé and Príncipe
- * Club domestic league appearances and goals

Adriano Eusébio (born 1 January 1967), sometimes known as Tino, is a Santomean football manager and former player, who managed the São Tomé and Príncipe national team. He was appointed the manager of São Tomé and Príncipe in 2019.

== Honours ==
=== Player ===
Bairros Unidos

- São Tomé and Príncipe Championship: 1982–83

=== Manager ===
Praia Cruz

- São Tomé and Príncipe Championship: 2014–15
- São Tomé and Príncipe Super Cup: 2014, 2017
