= TVS (São Tomé and Príncipe) =

Public broadcaster

TVS (Televisão Santomense)
- Type: Public
- Industry: Television
- Founded: 13 September 1992
- Headquarters: São Tomé, São Tomé Island, São Tomé and Príncipe
- Owner: Government of São Tomé and Príncipe
- Website: Official website

TVS (abbreviation of Televisão Santomense, English: Santomean TV) is the public television broadcaster of São Tomé and Príncipe. The station and its offices are located in the neighborhood of Fruta just a kilometer south-southwest of the center of São Tomé.

For many years, it had been the only television network in the country.

== About the station ==
São Tomé and Príncipe's first television broadcasts were conducted by means of an educational television system approved on September 24, 1970, under the name Telescola (same name as the system deployed by RTP), approved by Legislative Diploma nº. 822.

By initiative of Albertino Bragança, Fernando Paquete and Faustino de Carvalho, a television experiment using the pre-existing educational television equipment and staff from the national radio broadcaster was made with the aim of covering the 1982 FIFA World Cup. On July 15, 1982, after the success of the initial experiment, Televisão Experimental de São Tomé e Príncipe went live. The station was financed and built by Portuguese engineers.

TVS (Televisão Santomense) started broadcasting on September 13, 1992.

The network is the broadcaster of its matches featuring each of the island's major football (soccer) clubs in the São Tomé First Division and rarely the Príncipe Island League as well as the regional cups of the islands of São Tomé and Príncipe. It broadcasts all the coverage of the São Tomé and Príncipe Championship and the São Tomé e Príncipe Cup at the end of the year, at the start of the year, it broadcasts the São Tomé and Príncipe Super Cup match each year. The station also broadcast some other sports.

Recently, the network started broadcasting some FIFA World Cup matches.

President Carlos Vila Nova visited TVS's facilities on September 12, 2024, the day of its 32nd anniversary. The channel, however, has not grown in terms of human resources, despite having advanced technologically.

== Controversies ==
On December 9, 2010, the interview program Em Directo, at the time the most-watched on TVS, was suspended by the government after an interview with poet Conceição Lima on the then-current situation of the country. The program, which started in June 2010, was put under fire at the start of December when the Patrice Trovoada government banned the airing of an interview with former Cape Verdean prime minister Carlos Veiga, which was supported by TVS director Óscar Medeiros. All of the other editions of the program in the rest of December were also halted.

In June 2013, the government suspended TVS's most popular program, the comedy series Nós por Cá, due to its critical view of rice unsuitable for consumption. The comedians were given a €1,000 fine for allegedly posting the banned episode online.

== See also ==
- List of television stations in Africa
- Media of São Tomé and Príncipe
- Rádio Nacional de São Tomé e Príncipe - country's radio station - first radio station, aired in the mid-20th century
