= 2011 São Tomé and Príncipe Championship =

São Tomé and Principe Championship
- Season: 2011
- Champions: Sporting Clube do Principe
- Matches: 2

Location of teams in the São Tomé and Príncipe Championship 2011 .

The São Tomé and Principe Championship 2011 was the 26th season of the São Tomé and Principe Championship the top-level football championship of São Tomé and Principe. It began on 16 April 2011 and concluded in November 2011. Sporting Clube do Príncipe club from Príncipe island are the defending champions.

== Teams ==
18 teams participated in the São Tomé and Principe Championship, 12 teams from São Tomé Island and 6 teams from Príncipe Island . At the end of season champion of São Tomé Island League and champion of Principe Island League play one match for champion of São Tomé and Principe.

== Principe teams 2011 ==
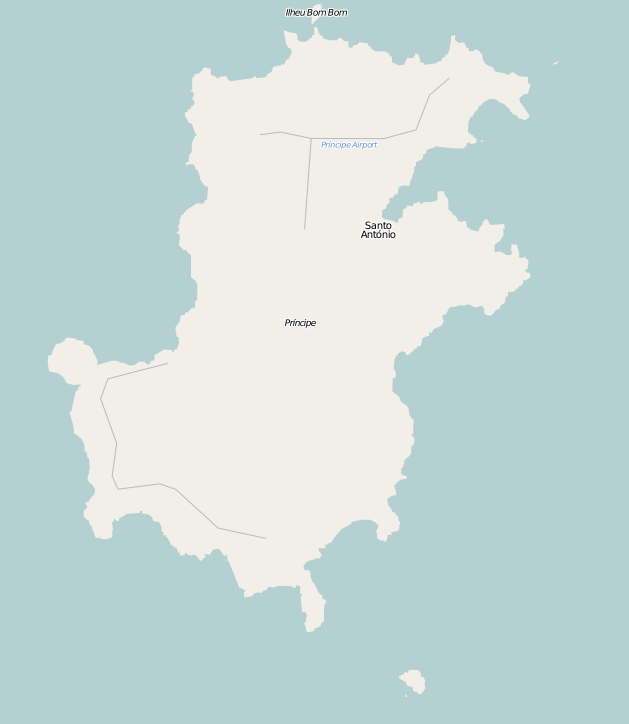
Location of teams in the Principe 2011 .

After the cancellation of the regional championships in 2010. The 2011 edition faced uncertainties for the definition of the champion. The original and unformal leader and vice (Sporting and Sport Operário e Benfica) were tied. The regional federation chose to verify the champion. They knew that Sport Operário e Benfica fielded a player that does not belong to that club. The regional title went to Sporting Clube do Príncipe (42 pts), second was Os Operários (39 pts, originally 42).

Later in the season, Porto Real did not appear in the matches to make easier for Sporting to win the championship. Porto Real were accused of bribery and was immediately suspended for a season, they were fined the equivalent of US$40, the bribery one was punishable by the equivalent of US$50.

Club	City	District	Island
1º de Maio	Santo António	Pagué	Príncipe
GD Os Operários	Santo António	Pagué	Príncipe
FC Porto Real	Porto Real	Pagué	Príncipe
Sporting Clube do Príncipe	Santo António	Pagué	Príncipe
GD Sundy (Current champions)	Sundy	Pagué	Príncipe
UDAPB	Picão	Pagué	Príncipe

=== League table ===
Pos	Team	Pld	W	D	L	GF	GA	GD	Pts	Qualification
1	Sporting Clube do Príncipe	3	3	0	0	10	4	+6	9	Qualification for 2011 São Tomé and Principe Championship
2	GD Os Operários	3	2	1	0	6	4	+2	7	
3	1º de Maio	3	1	2	0	6	5	+1	5	
4	FC Porto Real	3	1	0	2	7	8	−1	3	
5	GD Sundy	3	0	1	2	3	5	−2	1	
6	UDAPB	3	0	0	3	5	11	−6	0	

Updated to match(es) played on 10 July 2011. Source: Principe results 2011
Rules for classification: 1) points; 2) goal difference; 3) number of goals scored.

== National final ==
The national final match took place on December 21, 2011. Sporting Clube de Príncipe defeated Vitória FC of Riboque, São Tome Island. Sporting Príncipe was the eleventh club to win the first national title and brought the total number of Príncipe's titles won by any club to six. The winner of the league would have entered the qualifying rounds of the Champions League, neither clubs entered that season.

== São Tomé and Príncipe Cup ==
In the final of São Tomé and Principe Cup 2011 team FC Vitória beat GD Sundy 4-1 from Príncipe island and became the cup winner of 2011.
