= Taça Regional de São Tomé =

São Tomé Cup
- Founded: 1981 (unilateral); 2004 (entirety)
- Region: São Tomé Island, São Tomé and Príncipe
- Teams: 32
- Current champions: UDRA (5th time)
- Most championships: Vitória FC (Riboque) and UDRA (5 titles)

Taça Regional de São Tomé, literally the São Tomé Regional Cup is the regional knockout tournament of the island of São Tomé, it was unilaterally created in 1981 and was entirely created in 2001. The winner competes with the Príncipe Cup winner in the São Tomé and Príncipe Cup.

== History ==
From 1981 to 1984, the regional cup was also the national cup as Príncipe did not have its own cup competition at the time.

In 2017, the season had a club short due to Juba de Diogo Simão's withdrawal due to its dropping successes that the club suffered and mainly low budget for that club.

== Previous winners ==
Year	Winners	Score	Runners-up	Venue
1981	Desportivo de Guadalupe			
1982	Sporting Praia Cruz			
1983	No competition			
1984	No regional competition			
1985	Vitória FC			
1986	Vitória FC			
1987-1990	No regional competition			
1991	Santana FC			
1992	No regional competition			
1994	Sporting Praia Cruz	bt	Aliança Nacional	Estádio Nacional 12 de Julho
1995	Caixão Grande			
1996	Aliança Nacional			
1997-2000	No regional competition			
2001	Vitória FC			
2002	no competition			
2003	UDESCAI			
2004	No competition			
2005	No competition			
2006	No competition			
2007	Vitória FC			
2008	no competition			
2009 & 2010	6 de Setembro			
2011	Vitória FC			
2012	Desportivo de Guadalupe			
2013	UDRA			
2014	UDRA			
2015	Sporting Praia Cruz	7–3	Aliança Nacional	Estádio Nacional 12 de Julho
2016	UDRA	6–0	Folha Fede	Estádio Nacional 12 de Julho
2017	UDRA	2–0	Sporting Praia Cruz	Estádio Nacional 12 de Julho
2018	UDRA	2–1	Sporting Praia Cruz	Estádio Nacional 12 de Julho

=== Performance By Club ===
Club	Winners	Winning years
Vitória FC (Riboque)	5	1985, 1986, 2001, 2007, 2011
UDRA	5	2013, 2014, 2016, 2017, 2018
Sporting Praia Cruz	3	1982, 1994, 2015
Clube Desportivo de Guadalupe	2	1981, 2012
6 de Setembro	1	2010
Aliança Nacional	1	1996
Bairros Unidos FC	1	1995
Santana FC	1	1991
UDESCAI	1	2003

=== Performance by district ===
District	Winners	Winning years
Água Grande	9	1982, 1985, 1986, 1994, 1996, 2001, 2007, 2011, 2015
Caué	5	2013, 2014, 2016, 2017, 2018
Cantagalo	3	1991, 2003, 2010
Lobata	2	1981, 2012
Me-Zochi	1	1995
