= Tavarinho =

São Toméan footballer

Personal information
- Full name: Manuel Amado Tavares
- Date of birth: 20 December 1974 (age 51)
- Position: Defender

Team information
- Current team: UDRA

Senior career*
Years	Team	Apps	(Gls)
- UDRA

International career^{‡}
2015–	São Tomé and Príncipe	1	(0)
- * Club domestic league appearances and goals ‡ National team caps and goals as of 13 June 2015

Manuel Amado Tavares (born 20 December 1974), commonly known as Tavarinho, is a São Toméan footballer who plays as a defender for UD Rei Amador and the São Tomé and Príncipe national team.

== International career ==
Tavarinho made his international debut for São Tomé and Príncipe on 13 June 2015. His second match, this time in the African qualifiers for the 2018 World Cup, took place on October 8 of the same year (1-0 victory).
