= UDESCAI =

- Full name: União Desportiva Sardinha e Caça de Água-Izé
- Nickname: Unknown
- Ground: Campo de Futebol de Santana, São Tomé Island, São Tomé and Príncipe
- Capacity: 1000
- League: São Tomé and Príncipe Championship
- 2025: 8th

UDESCAI (União Desportiva Sardinha e Caça de Água-Izé) is a football club that plays in the São Tomé and Príncipe Championship. The team is based in the town of Água Izé in island of São Tomé and plays in Campo de Futebol de Santana in the north, it once played in Pantufo at Campo de Pantufo.

== History ==
The club was playing in the second division up to 2001. The team has only one insular title and it was in 2004 beating GD Os Operários. The team never won a national and the Taça Nacional de São Tomé and Príncipe titles. In the 2003 national Cup, the club was finalist.

In 2009, the club was 8th place, in 2013, the club finished 9th with 15 points and was relegated to the island's second division, a season later, the club was in the last positions and was relegated to the lowest Third Division for 2015. UDESCAI came back to the Second Division for 2016 after being in the top two of the Third Division. An unexpected climb was made for UDESCAI as they were second in the Second Division and together with Neves returned to the Premier Division for the 2017 season. UDESCAI had a good start in the first weeks of the season, their first match was a three-goal draw with Agrosport. In mid-season, UDESCAI had a wrong turn as they lost a couple of matches after they had only three wins and their stay in the First Division was only brief, the club lost the last two matches, first to Agrosport, then a suffering 0–8 loss to FC Neves and after promoting in two years, the club was relegated after finishing last place behind UD Correia. UDESCAI once again will compete in the Second Division for next season. Also UDESCAI finished with 15 points the same points as UDESCAI had when they were relegated four years earlier.

== Logo ==
Its logo is a seal and has a thick blue edges coloring the ocean with a thin black rim on either sides, the club name is written on the outer part of the seal with the club's location on the bottom. Inside is a small circle coloring from the lightest aqua-white to light aqua and tourmaline and has a sardine in the middle, of which the sardine is one of the most fished seafood in the country and is fished in the area, in the middle is a football (soccer ball).

== Honours ==
- Taça Regional de São Tomé: 1

2003

- São Tomé Island League: 1

2004

== League and cup history ==
Season	Div.	Pos.	Pl.	W	D	L	GS	GA	GD	P	Cup	Qualification or relegation
2011	2	5	21	9	5	7	16	18	-2	32		None
2012	2	7	18	4	7	7	13	22	-9	19		None
2013	2	9	18	4	3	11	20	40	-20	15		Relegated into the Island Second Division
2014	3		18	-	-	-	-	-	-	-		Relegated into the Island Third Division
2015	4		18	-	-	-	-	-	-	-		Promoted into the Regional Second Division
2016	3	2	18	-	-	-	-	-	-	-		Promoted into the Regional Premier Division
2017	2	12	22	3	6	13	26	49	-23	15		

== Statistics ==
- Best position: Finalist (national)
- Best position at cup competitions: Finalist (national)
- Appearances at the National Championships:
  - National: 1
