= São Tomé and Príncipe Super Cup =

- Founded: 1995
- Region: São Tomé and Príncipe
- Teams: 2
- Current champions: GD Os Operários (1st time)
- Most championships: Sporting Praia Cruz (5)

The São Tomé and Príncipe Super Cup (Portuguese: Super Taça de São Tomé e Príncipe) is a Super Cup competition played during the season in São Tomé and Príncipe. The competition is governed by the São Toméan Football Federation (FSF). The competition is also known for recent seasons as the António Aguiar National Super Cup (Supertaça Nacional Antònio Aguiar). The first super cup competition began in 1996.The regional champion competes with the cup winner. Sometimes, if a champion also has a cup title, a cup club who is runner-up qualifies. It is the only super cup competition in the country as there are no regional super cup competitions.

Its first of two participants came from São Tomé who competed in the first edition and were the first island to have a title. The first participant from Príncipe was Sundy who competed in the 2010 edition. It is the only national competition where all of the winners are from the island of São Tomé.

== Title history ==
Sporting Praia Cruz won the most numbering five, the only one with more than the title won. The remaining eight has only a title won.

Inter Bom-Bom was the first winner won in 1995, then was Bairros Unidos in 1996 and Sporting Praia Cruz in 1999 and became the only club to have more than a title won in 2000. 6 de Setembro became the fourth club to win a title in 2010, then Vitória in 2011, Guadalupe in 2012, UDRA in 2014 and recently Porto Real (or Príncipe) in 2017.

Água Grande has more titles won by any other district with 7 titles. Me-Zochi was the only district won until 1996. It only had two districts had a titles until 2012 when Lobata was added and lastly Caué from the south in 2014. Cantagalo and Lembá are the only districts that has no titles. Until April 7, 2018, all of the titles were won by clubs based on São Tomé Island. Príncipe now has a title won with Porto Real winning for the 2017 season with the final played in April 2018.

Between 2001 and 2009, the Super Cup competition was cancelled.

== Winners ==
Year	Winners	Score	Runners-up	Venue
1995	Inter Bom-Bom [São Tomé]		Bairros Unidos FC [São Tomé]	
1996	Bairros Unidos [São Tomé		Aliança Nacional [São Tomé]	
1999	Sporting Praia Cruz [São Tomé]		Vitória FC [São Tomé]	
2000	Sporting Praia Cruz [São Tomé]		Inter Bom-Bom [São Tomé]	
2001–08	Not held			
2009 & 2010	6 de Setembro [São Tomé]		GD Sundy [Príncipe]	
2011	Vitória Riboque [São Tomé]		GD Sundy [Príncipe]	
2012	CD Guadalupe [São Tomé]		Sporting Clube do Príncipe [Príncipe]	
2013	Sporting Praia Cruz [São Tomé]	1–1 (4–3 p)	UDRA [São Tomé]	
2014	UDRA [São Tomé]		Sporting Clube do Príncipe [Príncipe]	
2015	Sporting Praia Cruz [São Tomé]	2–1	Porto Real [Príncipe]	
2016	Sporting Praia Cruz [São Tomé]	2–0	UDRA [São Tomé]	Estádio Nacional 12 de Julho
2017	Porto Real [Príncipe]	1–1 (4–2 pen)	UDRA [São Tomé]	
2018	UDRA [São Tomé]	3–1	Porto Real [Príncipe]	
2019 (Note: Played in 2022)	Porto Real [Príncipe]	1–1 (4–2 pen)	Agro-Sport [São Tomé]	
2020–21	Not held			
2022	GD Os Operários [Príncipe]	4–0	Trindade	

=== Performance by club ===
Club	Winners	Winning years
Sporting Praia Cruz	5	1999, 2000, 2013, 2015, 2016
UDRA	2	2014, 2018
Porto Real	2	2017, 2019
6 de Setembro	1	2010
Bairros Unidos	1	1996
CD Guadalupe	1	2012
Inter Bom-Bom	1	1995
Vitória Riboque	1	2011
GD Os Operários	1	2022

=== Performance by island and district ===
Island	Total	District	Winners	Winning years
São Tomé	11	Água Grande	7	1999, 2000, 2010, 2011, 2013, 2015, 2016
São Tomé	11	Caué	2	2014, 2018
São Tomé	11	Lobata	1	2012
São Tomé	11	Mé-Zóchi	1	1996
Príncipe	3	Pagué	3	2017, 2019, 2022

== See also ==
- São Tomé and Príncipe Championships
- Taça Nacional de São Tomé and Príncipe
