= FC Inter Bom-Bom =

- Full name: Football Club Inter Bom-Bom
- Ground: Estadio Mé-Zóchi (José Mondlane), Bom-Bom; São Tomé Island, São Tomé and Príncipe
- Capacity: 1,000
- Chairman: Roberto Lomba
- Manager: Yuri Eusébio
- League: São Tomé and Príncipe Championship Second Division
- 2025: 9th
Home colours	Away colours	Third colours

Football Club Inter Bom-Bom is a football club that plays in the São Tomé Island League's Second Division. The team is based in the settlement of Bom-Bom in the district of Mé-Zóchi in the island of São Tomé. Its current manager is Roberto Lomba.

== History ==
The club was founded by young people on 18 June 1972 in Bom-Bom which was once included as part of the parish of Nossa Senhora de Fátima. Its first athletes wer from 12 to 16 years of age.

They became a registered club after independence in 1976 and played its first official matches in the Second Division. From then, the club's trajectory evolved into a more strengthened club.

The team has won three titles and is the eight team ever to win their first title in 1995 and was the first club from Me-Zochi to get a national championship honor. Their second was in 2000 and became the second to participate in the African championships in 2001 where they lost to Sony Elá Nguema of Equatorial Guinea. Inter Bombom possessed the fourth most titles shared with Guadalupe for three years and from 2001, Bairros Unidos for two years until they won their third and last title in 2003 and became the third most and shared it with Príncipe's Os Operários until 2004, where the club's rankings became fourth which still stands today. Inter played in the First Division until they were relegated in 2009.

Inter Bomp-Bom returned to the First Division and finished last in 2012 and was relegated. Inter Bom-Bom did not return to the Premier Division again until the 2015 season. Inter had a moderate, then a near unsuccessful season in 2017, the club gladly finished ninth and will continue to participate in the First Division in the following season.

== Uniform ==
Its uniform colors are sky blue clothing with a t-shirt striped black, shorts with a thick black rim in its edges and the top with two black stripes in its socks used for home matches. Its away uniform has a white t-shirt with a blue rim on top, a black-blue shorts with a double thin light blue lines on each side and white socks with two blue stripes on top. Its third color has a green t-shirt with three golf green thick lines in the middle and two white stripes on top, a white short with a thin blue rim in its edges and green socks with two blue stripes on top.

Former uniform up to 2016 were a blue-black striped t-shirt with white shorts and blue socks for home matches and a white t-shirt with a blue rim with black shorts and white socks for away matches.

Home uniform up to 2016
Away uniform up to 2016

== Honours ==
- São Tomé and Príncipe Championships: 3

1995, 2000, 2003

- São Tomé and Príncipe Super Cup: 1

1996

- São Tomé Island League: 3

1995, 2000, 2003

== League and Cup history ==
=== Performance in CAF competitions ===
- CAF Champions League: 1 appearance

2001 – Preliminary Round,
(Equatorial Guinea) Sony Elá Nguema, 0–2, 1–0

=== Island championships ===
Season	Div.	Pos.	Pl.	W	D	L	GS	GA	GD	P	Cup	Qualification/relegation
2012	2	12	18	-	-	-	-	-	-	-		
2015	3		18	-	-	-	-	-	-	-		Promoted into the Regional Premier Division
2016	2	7	22	5	4	13	32	39	-7	19		
2017	2	9	18	7	2	13	27	43	-16	23		

== Statistics ==
- Best position: 1st (national)
- Appearances:
  - National: 3
