= São Tomé and Príncipe Red Cross =

Humanitarian organization

- Founded: 1976
- Type: Non-profit organisation
- Purpose: Humanitarian Aid
- Location: São Tomé and Príncipe
- Affiliations: International Committee of the Red Cross; International Federation of Red Cross and Red Crescent Societies

The São Tomé and Príncipe Red Cross (Portuguese: Cruz Vermelha de São Tomé e Príncipe) was founded in 1976. It has its headquarters in São Tomé.
