= Santana FC =

Santana
- Full name: Santana Futebol Clube
- Ground: Campo de Futebol; Santana on São Tomé Island, São Tomé and Príncipe
- League: São Tome Island League
- 2011: 12th, Relegated
Home colours

Santana Futebol Clube is a football club that plays in the São Tomé and Príncipe Championship. The team is based in the island of São Tomé. The team has won one title and is the seventh team ever to win their first title as well as their only title in 1991. In the same year, they won the opening and the insular titles as well. Santana are one of two clubs from Cantagalo to get a national competitive honor.

Santana was the first São Tomean club to participate in any of the African competitions in 1999, the next appearance was in 2001 and the third was in 2013.

Santana was relegated to the regional Second Division in 2011 and remained there for three seasons until they reached the top two. Santana spent three seasons in the Premier Division, in 2016, the club finished 11th place which was inside the relegation zone. Santana is currently in the Second Division for the 2017 season.

== Honours ==
- National:
  - São Tomé and Príncipe Championships: 1

1991

  - Taça Nacional de São Tomé e Principe: 1

1991

- Regional:
  - São Tomé Island League: 1

1991

  - Taça Regional de São Tomé: 1

1991

== League and cup history ==
=== Performance in CAF competitions ===
- CAF Champions League: 1 appearance

1999 – withdrew in preliminary round, competed with Sony Elá Nguema of Equatorial Guinea

=== Island championships ===
Season	Div.	Pos.	Pl.	W	D	L	GS	GA	GD	P	Cup	Qualification/relegation
2011	2	12	21	2	3	16	15	44	-29	9		Relegated into the Regional Second Division
2012	3		18	-	-	-	-	-	-	-		None
2013	3		18	-	-	-	-	-	-	-		Qualified into the Regional Premier Division
2014	2	8	18	-	-	-	-	-	-	-		None
2015	2	2	18	7	7	4	19	19	0	28		
2016	2	11	22	4	5	13	25	42	-17	17		Relegated into the Regional Second Division

== Statistics ==
- Best position: 1st (national)
- Best position at cup competitions: 1st (national)
- Appearances:
  - National: 1
  - Regional: 33
