= FC Aliança Nacional =

Aliança Nacional
- Full name: Futebol Club Aliança Nacional
- Ground: Campo de Pantufo; Pantufo, São Tomé Island, São Tomé and Príncipe
- Capacity: 1,000
- Chairman: Casimiro Bernardes
- Manager: Ricardo Piedade
- League: São Tomé First Division
- 2025: 10th

Futebol Club Aliança Nacional or with (de Pantufo) (Portuguese meaning the Football Club National Alliance) is a football club based in Pantufo in the São Tomé and Príncipe Championship and plays at its own field. The team never claimed any national and insular titles, but won the cup in 1996.

== Logo ==
Its logo is a seal with a white rim reading the club name surrounded by an orange line. Inside is a black portion with two orange half crescents and an inner white crescents with the acronym ANP, the last three letters in the middle, the N is colored white and the other two are black and a slightly smaller size.

== History ==
The team lost in the semi-final to Sporting Clube Praia Cruz in 1994. Years later, the club was relegated to the second division and later returned to the first division where they reached second place in the 2001 season. They remained in the top division until 2009 when they were relegated after finishing 12th place. The club spent five years in the Second Division until they achieved promotion again in 2014 and returned to the Premier Division for the 2015 season.

== Honours ==
- Taça Nacional de São Tomé e Principe: 1

1996

== Seasons ==
=== Island championships ===
Season	Division	Place
2001	1st	2nd.
2009/10	1st	12th.

Season	Div.	Pos.	Pl.	W	D	L	GS	GA	GD	P	Cup	Qualification/relegation
2014	2	7	18	-	-	-	-	-	-	-		None
2015	2	7	18	6	6	6	22	28	-6	24		
2016	2	3	22	11	8	3	33	20	+13	41		
2017	2	6	22	9	6	7	26	27	-1	33		

== Statistics ==
- Best position: 2nd (national)
- Best position at cup competitions: 1st (national)
- Appearance at a national cup competition: 1
