= 6 de Setembro =

- Full name: Desportivo Militar 6 de Setembro
- Ground: Santana, São Tomé and Príncipe
- Capacity: 6,500
- League: São Tomé Island League
- 2024: 3rd
Home colours

Desportivo Militar 6 de Setembro (Portuguese meaning 6 September in which the date is founded) is a football club that plays in the São Tomé and Príncipe Championship. The team is based in the village of Santana island of São Tomé. The club is the country's only military football club. The team is one of the few teams to claim presently only one island and national title, the club also has two island and national cup wins.

Its logo has two silver blue eagles native to the island, one with a brown tail (brown tailed booby) on the right with two tags on top and bottom and a yellow shield in the middle with the club name inside, on top is a blue star. Its uniform colors are yellow and green.

== History ==
Their first cup title was won in 1988, 6 de Setembro made their second cup final appearance and lost the chance to win their second cup title for twenty years. The club was in the island division until they were relegated in the beginning of the 20th century, the club returned to the first division in the 2009/10 season and in the same season won their second and recent cup title. after defeating Andorinha 3–0. 6 de Setembro became the third most possessed cup titled with two, the other being Príncipe's GD Os Operários, it was shared with UDRA in 2015 and the ranking became fourth in 2016.

Later, the club was relegated to the second and then the third divisions. In 2014 and in 2015 alongside Palmar, the club did not take part in the regional championships.

Both 6 de Setembro and Palmar returned to competition, Palmar headed above to the Second Division while 6 de Setembro spend a season at the Third Division. The club won a Third Division title for 2016 and competed in the Second Division in the 2017 season, the club was second behind Sporting São Tomé and the club will return to the Premier Division for the following season.

== Honours ==
- National:
  - São Tomé and Príncipe Championships: 2

1988, 2023

  - Taça Nacional de São Tomé e Principe: 2

1988, 2010

  - São Tomé and Príncipe Super Cup: 1

2011

- Regional:
  - São Tomé Island League: 1

1988

  - Taça Regional de São Tomé: 1

2010

=== Tertiary achievement ===
- São Tomé Island Third Division: 1

2016

== League and cup history ==
=== Island championships ===
Season	Div.	Pos.	Pl.	W	D	L	GS	GA	GD	P	Cup	Qualification/relegation
2011	2	3	21	11	6	4	39	19	+20	39		None
2012	2	10	18	4	3	11	24	39	-14	17		Relegated into the Second Division
2013	3		18	-	-	-	-	-	-	-		Relegated into the Third Division
2014-15	3											Withdrew
2016	4	1	18	-	-	-	-	-	-	-		Promoted into the Regional Second Division
2017	2	2	18	-	-	-	-	-	-	-		Promoted into the Regional First Division

== Statistics ==
- Best position: 1st (national)
- Best position at cup competitions: 1st (national)
- Appearances:
  - National: 1
- Appearance at a national cup competition: 2
