= UDRA =

- Full name: União Desportiva Rei Amador
- Founded: 1995; 31 years ago
- Ground: Campo de Ribeira Peixe, near São João dos Angolares on São Tomé Island, São Tomé and Príncipe
- Capacity: 1,000
- Chairman: Domingos Fagundes
- Manager: Fabiano Castro
- League: São Tomé and Príncipe Championship
- 2025: 3rd
Home colours	Away colours

União Desportiva Rei Amador, known popularly by the abbreviation UDRA, is a football club based in the southern part of the island of São Tomé, in the city of São João dos Angolares. Founded in 1995, the club competes in the São Tomé and Príncipe Championship, using Campo de Ribeira Peixe. The club is named after Rei Amador, a slave king in Angolares mythology.

UDRA is recently the top 10 successful football (soccer) club in São Tomé Island and has the third most overall honours in São Tomé and Príncipe, having won about 13 official titles, seven are national and the remaining six are regional titles.

== History ==
UDRA was founded in 1995 and being one of the first football clubs in Caué which includes the southern part of the island. Years later, the team became a registered club. UDRA first played in the island's second division. In 2005, UDRA celebrated its 10th anniversary of the club's foundation.

UDRA became the twelfth and recent club to win their first title and along with four other clubs, has only one national title won today. The club now also has two national cup titles.

The club competed in the first division until the club was relegated in 2007 and did not return again until the 2009/10 season. Four years they were the island's top five clubs, their final positions creeped up each year, fourth in 2011 with 34 points and 31 goals scored, third in 2012 and fewer points and goals with 32 and 28, second in 2013 with a higher 41 points and 37 goals. UDRA finally finished first and won their first island title in 2014 which achieved them entry into the national championship event and competed with FC Porto Real of Príncipe with the score 2–1 away and 1–0 at home field, the match went into penalty shootouts and UDRA defeated Porto Real and became the 12th club to claim their first national title and being the only club from Caué to do so. Recently UDRA headed to the number one position during mid-season for the island, slightly lowered in the later part of the season weeks when Sporting Praia Cruz took it for a bit, in the last few weeks, UDRA took back the lead and won their second and recent regional title and achieved another entry into the national championships where they faced against Os Operários, second overall, this time in the championships in November, UDRA defeated Os Operários in all two legs and claimed their second and recent national title for the club and are now one of four clubs being fifth with the most national title with two. In the regionals, fourth ranked shared with Desportivo de Guadalupe. UDRA did not participate into the 2018 CAF Champions League due to financial and material reasons.

=== Cup competitions ===
UDRA won their very first cup title in 2013 after defeating GD Sundy 5–1, UDRA was the first club from Caué to get a national competitive honor. In the national cup, UDRA would go on to defeat Sporting Clube do Príncipe 2–1 to claim their second cup title, their overall totals became third. Two years later, UDRA was cup winner of São Tomé Island and headed to the 2016 national cup finals to face GD Os Operários, UDRA defeated that club 6-2 and won their third and recent cup title and became the club solely possessing the country's third most cup titles. Overall it was the second consecutive cup final that finished 6–2 by the cup winner. In the 2016 island championships, the club defeated UD Correia 8–0 on July 24 and made it the highest scoring match on the island. UDRA headed to the national cup final after defeating Aliança Nacional on September 17, 2017. On November 11, UDRA faced the island's and country's top two clubs Sporting Praia Cruz and UDRA defeated that club 2-0 and won their second straight island/regional cup title, second time UDRA did, a ticket to the national cup final was made and faced Príncipe's Porto Real on December 2, UDRA got a double where they won a second straight national cup title as they defeated Porto Real 1–0, Vando was the only scorer who scored at the 25th minute. In title totals by district by any club, Caue alongside Pagué became second out of seventh in cup totals superseded Cantagalo's three titles.

== Uniform ==
Its uniform colors features a blue-white striped T-shirt with white sleeves with the rest of the clothing blue used during home games and orange clothing with blue socks for away/alternate games Its shield color is brown with Rei Amador featured in the middle and the date of the foundation of the town at the bottom.

Home uniform up to 2016
Away/alternate uniform to 2016

== Honours ==
- National:
  - São Tomé and Príncipe Championship: 3

2014, 2017, 2018

  - São Tomé and Príncipe Cup: 4

2013, 2014, 2016, 2017

  - São Tomé and Príncipe Super Cup: 2

2014, 2018

- Regional:
  - São Tomé First Division: 2

2014, 2017, 2018

  - Taça Regional de São Tomé: 4

2013, 2014, 2016, 2017

== League and cup history ==
=== Island championships ===
Season	Div.	Pos.	Pl.	W	D	L	GS	GA	GD	P	Cup	Qualification/relegation
2011	2	4	21	10	4	7	31	18	+13	34		None
2012	2	3	18	10	2	6	28	26	+2	32		Advanced into the 2012 National Championship
2013	2	2	18	12	5	1	37	14	+23	41	Nat. Winner	Advanced into the 2013 National Championship
2014	2	1	18	16	1	1	34	9	-25	49	Nat. Winner	Advanced into the 2014 National Championship
2015	2	3	18	7	7	4	29	20	+9	28		
2016	2	5	22	9	6	7	43	24	+19	33	Nat. Winner	None
2017	2	1	22	13	7	2	47	20	-27	46	Nat. Winner	Advanced into the 2017 National Championships

== Statistics ==
- Best position: 1st (national)
- Best position at cup competitions: 1st (national)
- Appearances at the national championships: 2
- Appearances at a national cup competition: 4
- Appearances at a national super cup competition: 4
- Total goals scored at the national championships: 7
- Total goals scored at the national cup final: 13
- Total matches played:
  - National Championships: 4
  - National Cup: 6
- Best season: 2014 (16 wins, 49 points)
- Highest number of goals scored in a season: 47 (regional), in 2017
