= FC Porto Real =

- Full name: Futebol Clube Porto Real
- Ground: Porto Real and Estádio 13 de Julho on Principe Island, São Tomé and Príncipe
- League: Principe Island League
- 2025: 4th
Home colours

Futebol Clube Porto Real is a football club that plays in Porto Real on the island of Principe in São Tomé and Príncipe. The team competes in the Principe Island League in its local division. Like every other club on the island, it plays its matches at Estádio 13 de Julho in the island capital.

== History ==
The team was the island's first club to win an island title in 1985. In 1990, the club were one of three who had a title each. In 1993 that ranking became second. Porto Real won another island title in 1999. Sundy surpassed the club's title totals which made it third, it was shared with Sporting in 2012 for a season as Porto Real won two consecutive titles in 2013 and 2014, and became one of three clubs with the most titles on the island and, from 2016, one of four for one season, the titles totals became second behind Os Operários's five titles in September 2017.

The club was suspended for the 2012 season. In the champ finals, the club lost all three matches, the recent two were lost to Sporting Praia Cruz (0–2, 3–0) in the 2013 edition and UDRA in the 2014 edition. In the 2016 season, the scored the island's highest match where they defeated 1º de Maio 8–1, the club finished runner up behind Sporting Príncipe.

Porto Real became the island' fifth and recent club to win a regional cup title in 2015, at the national cup final, they lost 6–2 to Sporting Praia Cruz of São Tomé Island. Porto Real won their back to back title in 2017 after defeating UDAPB 3–2 in the cup final, it makes it second and became the club with the fourth most cup titles ahead of 1º de Maio and another national cup appearance will be made later in 2017 featuring UDRA. On November 25, UDRA won the national championship title and UDRA being a participant in the national cup final, Porto Real achieved entry into the upcoming national super cup which will take place in early 2018. Porto Real lost the national cup final and the title to UDRA. Nonetheless, Porto Real will qualify into the national super cup as cup runner up as UDRA was also champions, Porto Real made their second appearance on April 7, 2018, the match with UDRA ended with a goal scored at extra time, in the penalty shootouts, Porto Real won 4–3 and became the only club from Príncipe with a national super cup title. Also of the totals, they became second and last behind Sporting Praia Cruz with one title, sharing with 6 de Setembro, Bairros Unidos, Guadalupe, Inter Bom-Bom, UDRA and Vitória Riboque.

== Logo and uniform ==
Its logo colors are red, black and yellow. Its uniform color has a red shirt with black sleeves and black shorts and yellow socks used during home matches.

== Honours ==
=== National ===
- Taça Nacional de São Tomé e Príncipe
  - Winners (3): 2018, 2019, 2023
- São Tomé and Príncipe Supercup
  - Winners (2): 2017, 2019

=== Regional ===
- Príncipe Championship
  - Winners (4): 1985, 1999, 2013, 2014
- Príncipe Cup
  - Winners (2): 2015, 2017

== Seasons ==
=== Season to season ===
Season	Division	Place
2001	1st	3rd.
2003	1st	last.
2012	Suspended for the season	
2013	1st	1st.
2014	1st	1st
2016	1st	2nd.

== Statistics ==
- Best position: Finalist (national)
- Best position at cup competitions: 1st (national)
- Appearances:
  - National Championships: 4
  - Regional Championships: 18
- Appearance at a national cup competition: 1
- Appearances at a super cup competition: 2
- Total goals scored at a national cup final: 2
- Total goals scored at a super cup final: 2
