= GD Os Operários =

Os Operários
- Full name: Grupo Desportivo Os Operários
- Ground: Estádio 13 de Julho, Santo António, Príncipe Island, São Tomé and Príncipe
- Manager: Nestor Marimun Lopes Umbelina
- League: Principe Island League
- 2025: Winners (Principe) / Champions (National)

Grupo Desportivo Os Operários, sometimes known as Sport Operários e Benfica, is a football club that plays in the Principe Island League in São Tomé and Príncipe. The team is based in the island of Príncipe and plays at Estádio 13 de Julho in the island capital as does every club on the island. Os Operários is the second most successful football (soccer) club in Príncipe. It has one of the clubs with the most honours in São Tomé and Príncipe, having won 14 official titles, including six national and eight regional titles.

The club was once affiliated to Portugal's S.L. Benfica.

== Crest ==
Its club crest has a near-circle thick rim with blue on the left, purple in the middle and red on right. It has the club name and the club's location inside with a football (soccer ball) inside.

== History ==
=== Championship competitions ===
The team has won five regional titles and four national titles, it was the sixth team ever to win their first title in 1990 and first from the island. In 1993, they won their second regional and national title and their third regional and national in 1998. Their fourth title was won in 2004, no titles were claimed in the 2005 and the 2006 season due to arbitrarily reasons which relegated teams into the second division, the next regional title was claimed by UDAPB in 2007. Their national championship titles were second behind Vitória and shared with Sporting Praia Cruz until 2007, when the club won a title and Operários' totals became third. At the regional level, they possess the greatest number of championship titles, they solely held it from 1993 to 2002 and from 2004 to 2009 when it became shared with GD Sundy, two more were shared, Porto Real in 2014 and Sporting Príncipe in 2016. In late-September 2017, Os Operários finally won another regional championship title in 13 years and thus became the club with the greatest number of regional titles (last time exceeding the totals once shared by Porto Real, Sporting Príncipe and Sundy). The club will make their next national appearance in 13 years.

The club finished second in the 2011 season behind Sporting Clube do Principe.

=== Cup competitions ===
The club also won two cup titles and was a finalist in 1999. In 2003, they hold the third most cup titles won in the country, in 2010, it was shared with 6 de Setembro from the island of São Tomé and later it was shared with UDRA of the same island in 2015, in 2016, the ranking became fourth. Regionally the club won three cup titles, first in 1999, then in 2003 and in 2016. Os Operários came to the 2016 national cup final and lost 6–2 to UDRA in November. Its regional cup titles was one of two clubs that shared it in 1999, the other was 1º de Maio, later it had GD Sundy and was one of three from 2003. That total became second in 2007 behind GD Sundy, two clubs shared it to 2010 as Sporting shared it until 2012 when its totals became third and last until 2013 when it became second ever since, from 2014 to 2016, they were shared with Sporting and their totals was third.

== Honours ==
- São Tomé and Príncipe Championships: 6

1990, 1993, 1998, 2004, 2021-22, 2025

- São Tomé and Príncipe Cup: 3

1992, 2003, 2024

- Príncipe Island League: 5

1990, 1993, 1998, 2004, 2017

- Taça Regional de Príncipe: 3

1992, 1999, 2003

- São Tomé and Príncipe Super Cup: 1

2022

== League and cup history ==
=== Island championships ===
Season	Div.	Pos.	Pl.	W	D	L	GS	GA	GD	P	Cup	Qualification/relegation
2017	2	1	20	14	4	2	60	18	+42	46		Advanced into the 2017 National Championship

== Statistics ==
- Best position: 1st (national)
- Best position at cup competitions: 1st (national)
- Appearances:
  - National Championships: 5
  - Regional Championships: 19
- Appearances at a regional cup competition: 13
