= Bairros Unidos FC =

- Full name: Bairros Unidos Futebol Clube
- Ground: Caixão Grande, São Tomé Island, São Tomé and Príncipe
- Chairman: Sandro Ribeiro
- Manager: Fernão Bernardes
- League: São Tomé Second Division (II)
- 2024: 11th, São Tomé Premier Division (relegated)

Bairros Unidos Futebol Clube (also known as Caixão Grande) is a football club that plays in the São Tomé and Príncipe Championship. The team is based in the island of São Tomé and the village of Caixão Grande. The team has won five overall titles. As, Caixão Grande, the club won their first and only cup title in 1995. It is the eighth and last team ever to win their first island and national title in 1996 . Under the present name Bairros Unidos, the club won their second and recent island title in 2001 and later the national title in 2001 after defeating Príncipe's GD Sundy (2–0 away, 4–2 at home). Their title totals were fourth in the nation and shared it with Inter Bom-Bom and Guadalupe, in 2003, Inter Bombom's win made Bairros Unidos' rankings fifth, in 2012 it became shared with Sporting Clube do Príncipe and still stands today. The club relegated to the second division in 2009 after being in the last two positions The club again returned to the island Premier Division in recent years.

== Logo ==
Its logo has a green shield with yellow edges inside a blue portion. The club names are on each side. The town's crest is inside the logo.

== Honours ==
- National:
  - São Tomé and Príncipe Championships: 2

1996, 2001

  - São Tomé and Príncipe Cup: 1

1995

  - São Tomé and Príncipe Super Cup: 1

1997

- Regional:
  - São Tomé Island League: 2

1996, 2001

  - Taça Regional de São Tomé: 1

1997

== League and cup history ==
=== Island championships ===
Season	Div.	Pos.	Pl.	W	D	L	GS	GA	GD	P	Cup	Qualification/relegation
2011	2	7	21	7	8	6	25	22	+3	29		None
2012	2	2	18	10	3	5	31	21	+10	33		None
2013	2	4	18	8	5	5	30	20	+10	29		None
2014	2	3	18	-	-	-	-	-	-	-		None
2015	2	6	18	7	5	6	22	17	+5	26		None
2016	2	2	22	13	4	5	45	26	+19	43		None
2017	2	3	22	11	6	5	40	37	+3	39		None

== Statistics ==
- Best position: 1st (national)
- Best position at cup competitions: 1st (national)
- Appearances:
  - National: 2
