= São Toméan Football Federation =

National football governing body

CAF
- Founded: 1975
- Headquarters: Rua João de Deus; São Tomé
- FIFA affiliation: 1986
- CAF affiliation: 1986
- President: Domingos Monteiro
- Website: http://federacaosantomensefutebol.st/

The São Toméan Football Federation (Portuguese: Federação Santomense de Futebol — FSF) is the governing body of football in São Tomé and Príncipe. It was founded on July 11, 1975, affiliated to FIFA and to CAF in 1986. It organises the national football league and the national team.

Its headquarters is located in the city of São Tomé at Rua João de Deus, its postal code is 440.

== National Stadium ==
Since 2021, the Estádio Nacional 12 de Julho has been banned by the Confederation of African Football (CAF) from hosting international matches due to non-compliance with technical, safety, and infrastructure standards. As a result, the São Tomé and Príncipe national football team has been forced to play its home fixtures in neutral venues abroad, primarily in Morocco.

Following preliminary negotiations in May 2023 between the Ministry of Youth and Sports and the federation, the Government of São Tomé and Príncipe approved an official resolution on 1 December 2023 authorizing the transfer of the stadium's management and rehabilitation to the São Toméan Football Federation, enabling the body to secure development funds from FIFA and CAF. Despite the official concession, no structural renovation works had taken place as of mid-2026, with the venue remaining in a severe state of disrepair and banned for international competitions while continuing to host domestic league matches.
