= Porto Real, São Tomé and Príncipe =

Porto Real
- Village
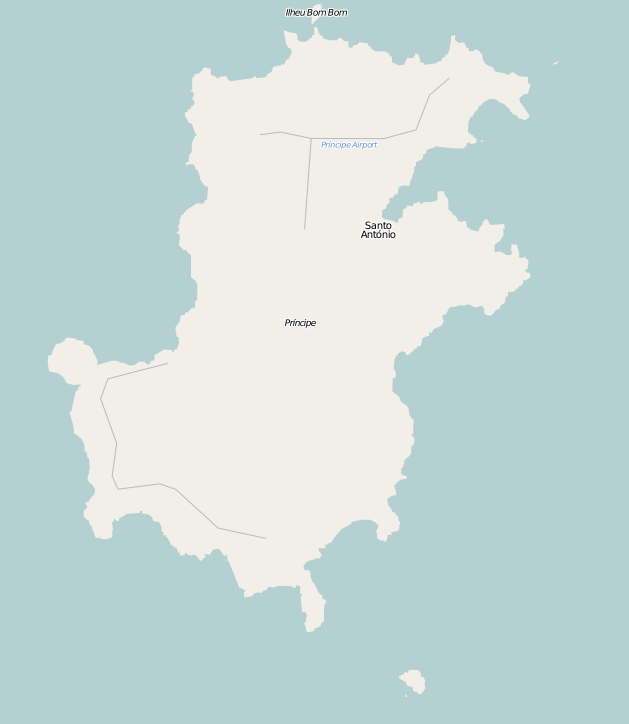
- Location on Príncipe Island
- Coordinates: 1.6246°N 7.4061°E
- Country: São Tomé and Príncipe
- Autonomous Region: Príncipe

Population (2012)
  - Total: 296
- Time zone: UTC+1 (WAT)

Porto Real (Portuguese for the Royal Port) is a village in the central part of Príncipe Island in São Tomé and Príncipe in the Gulf of Guinea. Its population is 296 (2012 census). Porto Real is located southwest of the island capital of Santo António. Porto Real is home to an abandoned plantation called Roça Porto Real, which lies in ruins.

== Population history ==
Historical population
Year	Pop.	±%
2001	239	—
2008	272	+13.8%
2012	296	+8.8%
