= Sundy, São Tomé and Príncipe =

Sundy
- Settlement
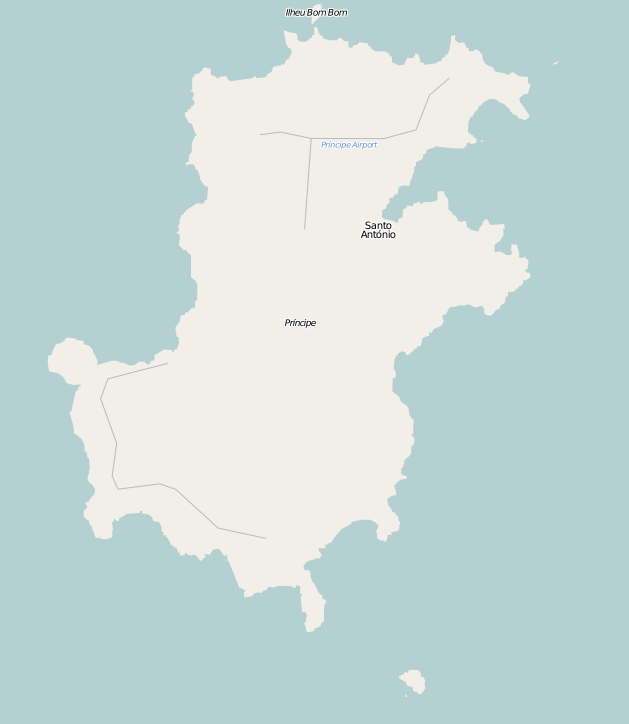
- Location on Príncipe Island
- Coordinates: 1.6694°N 7.3842°E
- Country: São Tomé and Príncipe
- Autonomous Region: Príncipe

Population (2012)
  - Total: 416
- Time zone: UTC+1 (WAT)

Sundy is a settlement in the northwestern part of Príncipe Island in São Tomé and Príncipe. Its population is 416 (2012 census). Sundy lies 5 km northwest of the island capital of Santo António. In 1822 the first cocoa plantation of the whole archipelago was established in Sundy. Several buildings of this plantation have been preserved.

== Population history ==
Historical population
Year	Pop.	±%
2001	362	—
2008	413	+14.1%
2012	222	−46.2%
