= Taça Nacional de São Tomé e Príncipe =

São Tomé e Príncipe Cup Santomean Cup Taça Nacional de São Tomé e Príncipe
- Founded: 1976
- Region: (São Tomé and Príncipe)
- Teams: 2
- Current champions: Porto Real
- Broadcaster(s): TVS (television); RTS (radio)

Taça Nacional de São Tomé e Príncipe is the top knockout tournament of the São Toméan Football Federation, it was created in 1981. The cup winner of São Tome island competes with a cup winner from Príncipe Island. The winner competes in (both) the São Tomé and Príncipe Super Cup (and the CAF Confederation Cup the following season, when a club also won a championship title, a second place club competes).

As with the national championship matches, the national cup competition are broadcast each year on the state network TVS, Santomean TV, the nation's only network.

When Príncipe Island had no competition until 1999, the second placed cup team competed in the competition up to 1999 and the last one in 2001. In 2000 and 2001, the cup winner of Prínicipe first competed at the semis.

The editions from 2004 to 2006 were not held, as the same reason in the championships, due to several clubs that did not to be relegated.

== Previous winners ==
Year	Winners	Score	Runners-up	Venue
1981	Desportivo de Guadalupe (São Tomé)			
1982	Sporting Praia Cruz (São Tomé)			
1983	No competition			
1984	Vitória FC (São Tomé)			
1985	Vitória FC (São Tomé)			
1986	Vitória FC (São Tomé)			
1987	No competition			
1988	6 de Setembro (São Tomé)			
1989	Vitória FC (São Tomé)	1-1 awd	Sporting Praia Cruz (São Tomé)	Estádio Nacional 12 de Julho
1990	Vitória FC (São Tomé)	1-0	6 de Setembro (São Tomé)	Estádio Nacional 12 de Julho
1991	Santana FC (São Tomé)			
1992	GD Os Operários (Príncipe)			
1993	Sporting Praia Cruz (São Tomé)			
1994	Sporting Praia Cruz (São Tomé)	bt	Aliança Nacional (São Tomé)	Estádio Nacional 12 de Julho
1995	Caixão Grande (São Tomé)			
1996	Aliança Nacional (São Tomé)			
1997	No competition			
1998	Sporting Praia Cruz (São Tomé)			
1999	Vitória FC (São Tomé)	3-2	GD Os Operários (Príncipe)	
2000	Sporting Praia Cruz (São Tomé)	3-1 (aet)	Caixão Grande (São Tomé)	Estádio Nacional 12 de Julho
2001	GD Sundy (Príncipe)	4-3	Vitória FC (São Tomé)	
2002	no competition			
2003	GD Os Operários (Príncipe)	1-0	UDESCAI (São Tomé)	
2004	No competition			
2005	No competition			
2006	No competition			
2007	Vitória FC (São Tomé)	bt	GD Sundy (Príncipe)	
2008	no competition			
2009 & 2010	6 de Setembro (São Tomé)	2–1	Sporting Clube do Príncipe (Príncipe)	
2011	Vitória FC (São Tomé)	4–1	GD Sundy (Príncipe)	
2012	Sporting Clube do Príncipe (Príncipe)	1–0	Desportivo de Guadalupe (São Tomé)	
2013	UDRA (São Tomé)	5–1	GD Sundy (Príncipe)	
2014	UDRA (São Tomé)	2–1	Sporting Clube do Príncipe (Príncipe)	
2015	Sporting Praia Cruz (São Tomé)	6–2	Porto Real (Príncipe)	Estádio Nacional 12 de Julho
2016	UDRA (São Tomé)	6–2	GD Os Operários (Príncipe)	Estádio Nacional 12 de Julho
2017	UDRA (São Tomé)	1–0	Porto Real (Príncipe)	Estádio Nacional 12 de Julho
2018	Porto Real (Príncipe)	2–1	UDRA (São Tomé)	Estádio Nacional 12 de Julho
2019	Porto Real (Príncipe)	3–2 (aet)	UD Santa Margarida (São Tomé)	Estádio Nacional 12 de Julho
2020	No competition			
2021–22	Trindade (São Tomé)	3–1	GD Sundy (Príncipe)	Estádio Nacional 12 de Julho
2023	Porto Real (Príncipe)	6–0	UD Amadora de Agostinho Neto (São Tomé)	Estádio Nacional 12 de Julho
2024	GD Os Operários (Príncipe)	1–1 (aet, 4–3 pen)	6 de Setembro (São Tomé)	Estádio Nacional 12 de Julho

=== Performance By Club ===
Club	Winners	Winning years
Vitória Riboque	8	1984, 1985, 1986, 1989, 1990, 1999, 2007, 2011
Sporting Praia Cruz	6	1982, 1993, 1994, 1998, 2000, 2015
UDRA	4	2013, 2014, 2016, 2017
Porto Real	3	2018, 2019, 2023
GD Os Operários	3	1992, 2003, 2024
6 de Setembro	2	1988, 2010
Aliança Nacional	1	1996
Caixão Grande	1	1995
Desportivo de Guadalupe	1	1981
Santana FC	1	1991
Sporting Clube do Príncipe	1	2012
GD Sundy	1	2001
Trindade	1	2021–22

=== Performance By island and district ===
Island	Winners	District	Winners	Winning years
São Tomé	23	Água Grande	14	1982, 1984, 1985, 1986, 1990, 1993, 1994, 1996, 1998, 1999, 2000, 2007, 2011, 2015
São Tomé	23	Caué	4	2013, 2014, 2016, 2017
São Tomé	23	Cantagalo	3	1991, 1998, 2010
São Tomé	23	Mé-Zóchi	2	1996, 2021–22
São Tomé	23	Lobata	1	1981
Príncipe	8	Pagué	8	1992, 2001, 2003, 2012, 2018, 2019, 2023, 2024
