= GD Cruz Vermelha =

Cruz Vermelha
- Full name: Grupo Desportivo Cruz Vermelha
- Ground: Almeirim; Estádio Nacional 12 de Julho, São Tomé Island, São Tomé and Príncipe
- Capacity: 6,500
- Chairman: Gonçalo Godinho
- Manager: Filipe Evangelista
- League: São Tomé and Príncipe Championship
- 2011: 8th

Grupo Desportivo Cruz Vermelha (Portuguese for the Red Cross) is a football club that plays in the São Tomé and Príncipe Championship, it is based in the village of Almeirim. It is named after the Red Cross. The team has yet to win any major titles in its history.

The club won Group A of the second division in 2003 and participated in the first division. The club was relegated to the second division in 2009 and returned a few years later and returned again in 2014 and was relegated to the third division for the first time. The club competed in the third division for the next three seasons and was placed second in 2017 and inside the qualification position, the club will return to the Second Division for the following season.
