= Pantufo =

- Town
- Location on São Tomé Island
- Coordinates: 0°18′52″N 6°44′38″E
- Country: São Tomé and Príncipe
- Island: São Tomé
- District: Água Grande

Population (2012)
  - Total: 1,836
- Time zone: UTC+1 (WAT)

Pantufo is a town in the Água Grande District of São Tomé and Príncipe. It is located on the coast, 3 km southeast from the capital São Tomé. Its population is 1,836 (2012 census). It is considered the only urban settlement in the country, apart from the capital.

== Population history ==
Historical population
Year	Pop.	±%
2001	982	—
2008	1,119	+14.0%
2012	1,836	+64.1%

== Sporting clubs ==
- Futebol Club Aliança Nacional - football (soccer)
