= Príncipe Island League =

Football division in Principe

- Founded: 1985
- Region: Príncipe (and its surroundings), São Tomé and Príncipe
- Number of clubs: 6
- Promotion to: São Tomé and Príncipe Championship
- Domestic cup: Príncipe Island Cup
- Current champions: 1° de Maio (2026)
- Top scorer: Jamilson Santos (141 goals)

Príncipe Island League is the top division of the São Toméan Football Federation for the Príncipe Island. The league consists only a single tier and features six clubs. GD Os Operários is the current championship winner which won a total of five titles and is now the only club with the most titles numbering five.

Since 2011, every single club on the island has a regional championship title.

== History ==
The first edition took place in 1985. Cancellations occurred first to financial problems and only a few clubs that time, from 1986 to 1988, then from 1991 to 1992 and from 1994 to 1997. A few more cancellations occurred from 2004 to 2005, 2008 and there were no single season in 2010.

In 2009, two clubs shared the most number of championship titles and were GD Os Operários and Sundy, in 2014, it was three with Porto Real's win and Sporting Principe in 2016 which made it to four. In 2017, Os Operários again became the only club to possess the most titles with five. Sundy, Porto Real and Sporting Príncipe are now second in title totals with four each.

== Príncipe Island League – clubs (2017) ==
- 1º de Maio
- FC Porto Real
- GD Os Operários
- GD Sundy
- Sporting Clube do Príncipe
- UDAPB

== Previous winners ==
- 1985 : FC Porto Real
- 1986-1988: No championships
- 1989 : GD Sundy
- 1990 : GD Os Operários
- 1991-1992: no championships
- 1993 : GD Os Operários
- 1994-1997 : no championship
- 1998 : GD Os Operários
- 1999 : FC Porto Real
- 2000 : GD Sundy
- 2001 : GD Sundy
- 2002 : no championship
- 2003 : 1º de Maio
- 2004 : GD Os Operários
- 2005-2006 : no championship
- 2007 : UDAPB
- 2008 : no championship
- 2009 : GD Sundy
- 2010 : no championship
- 2011 : Sporting Clube do Príncipe
- 2012 : Sporting Clube do Príncipe
- 2013 : FC Porto Real
- 2014 : FC Porto Real
- 2015 : Sporting Clube do Príncipe
- 2016 : Sporting Clube do Príncipe
- 2017 : GD Os Operários
- 2018 : FC Porto Real
- 2026 : 1° de Maio

=== Performance by club ===
Club	Winners	Winning years
GD Os Operários	5	1990, 1993, 1998, 2004, 2017
FC Porto Real	5	1985, 1999, 2013, 2014, 2018
Sporting Clube do Príncipe	4	2011, 2012, 2015, 2016
GD Sundy	4	1989, 2001, 2002, 2009
1º de Maio	2	2003, 2026
UDAPB	1	2007

=== Performance by area ===
Club	Winners	Winning years
Santo António	9	1990, 1993, 1998, 2004, 2011, 2012, 2015, 2016, 2017
Porto Real	5	1985, 1999, 2013, 2014, 2018
Sundy	4	1989, 2001, 2002, 2009
Novo Estrela	1	2003
Picão	1	2007

=== Top goalscorers ===
Season	Player	Team	Goals
2021	(São Tomé and Príncipe) Jamilson Santos	Sundy	23
2022	(São Tomé and Príncipe) Jamilson Santos	Sundy	27
2023	(São Tomé and Príncipe) Jamilson Santos	Porto	22
2024	(São Tomé and Príncipe) Jamilson Santos	Porto	25
2025	(São Tomé and Príncipe) Jamilson Santos	1⁰ de Maio	24
2026	(São Tomé and Príncipe) Jamilson Santos	1⁰ de Maio	20
