= Caixão Grande =

- Village
- Location on São Tomé Island
- Coordinates: 0°18′N 6°42′E
- Country: São Tomé and Príncipe
- Island: São Tomé
- District: Mé-Zóchi

Population (2018)
  - Total: 1,079
- Time zone: UTC+1 (WAT)

Caixão Grande is a town on São Tomé Island in the nation of São Tomé and Príncipe. Its population is 1,021 (2012 census). It lies about 5 km southwest of the national capital São Tomé.

== Population history ==
Historical population
Year	Pop.	±%
2001	890	—
2008	1,014	+13.9%
2012	1,021	+0.7%

== Sporting clubs ==
Caixão Grande is home to Bairros Unidos FC (also known as Caixão Grande) that plays in the São Tomé Island League.
