= GD Sundy =

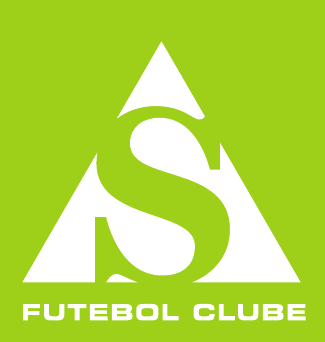
- Full name: Grupo Desportivo Sundy
- Nickname: Nigéria (Nigeria)
- Ground: Campo de Sundy, Sundi; Estádio 13 de Julho, Santo António, Principe Island, São Tomé and Príncipe
- League: Principe Island League
- 2025: 3rd

Grupo Desportivo Sundy is a football club that is based in the section of Sundy/Sundi in the island of Principe in São Tomé and Príncipe. The team plays in the Principe Island League in its local division and plays at Estádio 13 de Julho in the island capital as every club on the island does. Their main field is Campo de Sundi which is located in Sundi. Its nickname is Nigéria, Portuguese for Nigeria.

== History ==
The team won their island title in 1989, and the tenth club to claim the first national title in 2010 and is their only one. Their first three championship finals participation ended with a loss, first to Inter Bom-Bom, then to Bairros Unidos a year later. At the 2007 national semis, they lost to Vitória 4–3 on May 12. On March 6, 2010, Sundy challenged against 6 de Setembro in the national final for the title. In the 11th minute of the second half, Sundy scored 1–3 including a penalty.

In regional championship totals, the club title was shared with Os Operários in 1990 up to 1993 when Sundy's totals became second, then third after Porto Real won their second title in 1999. Sundy's champ title totals was shared again with Porto Real with two in 2001 and then Os Operários in 2002 with the most with three, Sundy's title total became second in 2004 and lasted until 2009 when it was shared with Os Operários again as the most titles claimed, that number was later shared with Porto Real in 2014 and Sporting Príncipe for a season in 2016. Along with Porto Real's and Sporting's, its total became second behind Os Operários's five totals in September 2017.

Also Sundy won their first cup title in 2001 and their most recent in 2013 totaling 4. Sundy's first appearance at the reformatted cup final was in 2001 where they lost to Vitória FC (Riboque) 4–3, later they lost to the same club in 2007 and in 2011 with the score 4–1, their last final was in 2013 which was also unsuccessful, they lost to UDRA from the south of São Tomé 5–1.

== Honours ==
- São Tomé and Príncipe Championship: 1

2009/10

- Principe Island League Championship: 4:

1985, 2000, 2001, 2009

- Taça Regional de Príncipe: 4

2001, 2007, 2011, 2013

== Statistics ==
- Best position: 1st (national)
- Best position at cup competitions: 1st (national)
- Appearances:
  - National Championships: 4
  - Regional Championships: 19
- Appearance at a national cup competition: 4
