= UDAPB =

- Full name: União Desportiva Aeroporto, Picão e Belo Monte
- Ground: Estádio 13 de Julho, Santo António, Principe Island, São Tomé and Príncipe
- League: Principe Island League
- 2025: 6th

União Desportiva Aeroporto, Picão e Belo Monte (English: Picão e Belo Monte Airport Sporting Union, abbreviation and common form: UDAPB) is a football club that plays in Santo António in the island of Principe in São Tomé and Príncipe. The team competes in the Principe Island League in its local division. Like every other team on the island, it plays all its matches at Estádio 13 de Julho in the island capital. It is located next to the island's only airport and is based in the village of Picão. The club area includes the Santo António subdivision of Aeroporto and Belo Monte, São Tomé and Príncipe in the northeast which the club area includes, other areas include the whole northeast of the island and Santa Rita.

== History ==
The club was founded with the merger of then unregistered clubs of Picão, Aeroporto de Príncipe and Belo Monte and not longer after became registered. The team won their only island title in 2007. Its titles totals were third and were shared with 1º de Maio until 2012 when Sporting shared it, along with 1º de Maio, its title total became fifth which is since 2013.

In the nationals on May 12, 2007, UDAPB competed against Sporting Clube Praia Cruz at Estádio Nacional 12 de Julho and lost 2–4.

Between late 2012 and late 2015, UDAPB and FC Porto Real were the two remaining clubs without a regional cup title. Since late 2015, UDAPB is the only club on the island without a cup title and a national cup competition appearance.

On September 30 at the island's stadium, UDAPB got their chance to win their only cup title and attempt to have not a single team without a cup title. However, this failed as they lost to FC Porto Real 3–2 in a cup final.

== Honours ==
- Principe League Island Championship: 1

2007

== Statistics ==
- Best position: Finalist (national)
- Best position at cup competitions: Finalist (regional)
- Appearances:
  - National Championships: 1
- Total goals scored at the national championships: 2
