= Sporting Clube do Príncipe =

- Full name: Sporting Clube do Príncipe
- Founded: February 6, 1915; 111 years ago
- Ground: Campo de Futebol de Santo António, Santo António, São Tomé and Príncipe
- Capacity: 1,000
- Chairman: Vladir Soares
- League: Principe Island League
- 2025: 5th
Home colours	Away colours

Sporting Clube do Príncipe is a football club that plays in the island of Principe in São Tomé and Príncipe. The team plays in the Principe Island League in its local division.

== History ==
The club was founded on February 6, 1915, and is the oldest club on the island and in the nation. Sporting Príncipe is the 183rd affiliate of Sporting Clube de Portugal.

The team won two titles in the national championship in late 2011 and 2012, the club became the eleventh to win their first title and the seventh and recent to win their second title in the country and their totals were third on the island behind Os Operários and Sundy. In 2013, their regional totals became fourth as Porto Real won another title. At the regional level, they got their fourth regional title for 2016 which was also their second consecutive and along with three other clubs possessed the most regional titles, later they qualified to the 2016 National Championships which became the second straight Sporting challenge. Over there, the club lost the first leg and the second leg had a goal draw, thus by a goal total difference, lost the title to Sporting Praia Cruz. In late September 2017, along with Porto Real's and Sundy's, their champ title totals became second behind Os Operários's five title totals.

Their only national cup win came in late 2012 where they defeated Desportivo de Guadalupe by one point. The club alongside a few others including GD Sundy and Santana FC was fifth, it was later shared with UDRA and Sporting Príncipe's total is now sixth.

Their planned first cup win failed as 6 de Setembro defeated the club 2–1 in 2010. In 2016, they attempted to win another regional cup and share the totals with Sundy as first, it was thwarted as they lost 1–0 to Os Operários in November 2016.

In the national championship titles, their total is fifth with two titles, shared with Caixão Grande and CD Guadalupe, since November 26, 2017, the titles are now shared with UDRA. In the regional cup, the club became the fourth to have won a title in 2010 and its totals were fourth, they won their second title for 2012 and its totals became second for a season, later they were shared with GD Os Operários for one season after Sporting won their third and recent one in 2014 and its totals became second for a season until the same club shared it in 2016.

Their first appearance in the CAF Champions League was in 2013 and they've competed only in the Preliminaries and lost to Enugu Rangers.

== Logo ==
Its logo is roughly the same but is colored aqua blue.

== Uniform ==
Its uniform is identical to Sporting CP, but several are different from Sporting Lisbon's.

Its uniform has a white-green striped t-shirt with green sleeves and the remainder black for home games, its away uniform has a yellow t-shirt with everything else blue for away or alternate games.

Former uniforms were a thin white-green striped shirt with black shorts with a white rim and green socks with a white stripe for home games, its away uniform was a grass green t-shirt and shorts with a white chevron in the shirt and white socks and its third uniform was a light grey-green t-shirt and a dark grass green shorts with a black chevron in the shirt. These three used up to 2013 Between 2013 and 2014, its home uniform was a white-green t-shirt with white shorts and green socks for home games and a yellow t-shirt with green shorts and yellow socks for away games.

Home uniform up to from 2013 to 2014	Home uniform up to 2013 to 2014	Home uniform up to 2013	Away uniform up to 2013	Third colour uniform up to 2013

== Honours ==
- São Tomé and Príncipe Championship: 2

2011, 2012

- Taça Nacional de São Tomé e Príncipe: 1

2012

- Príncipe League Island Championship: 4:

2011, 2012, 2015, 2016

- Príncipe Regional Cup: 3

2009, 2012, 2014

== Performance in CAF competitions ==
- CAF Champions League: 1 appearance

2013 – Preliminary Round

(Nigeria) Enugu Rangers

== Statistics ==
- Best position: 1st (national)
- Best position at cup competitions: 1st (national)
- Appearances:
  - National Championships: 3
  - Regional Championships: 19
- Appearances at a national cup competition: 3
- Total goals scored at the national championships: 12

== See also ==
- Sporting Praia Cruz, another Sporting Club in the nation located in the island of São Tomé
