= 1º de Maio =

- Full name: 1º de Maio
- Nickname: Unknown
- Founded: May 1, 1982
- Ground: Novo Estrela and Estádio 13 de Julho on Principe Island, São Tomé and Príncipe
- Capacity: N/A
- Chairman: N/A
- Manager: Aldo Cruz
- League: Principe Island League
- 2025: 2nd

Grupo Desportivo 1º de Maio is a football club that plays in the island of Principe in São Tomé and Príncipe. The team competes in the Principe Island League in its local division. Like every other club on the island, it plays all its matches at Estádio 13 de Julho in the island capital.

== History ==
The team was founded on May 1, 1982, and named after the foundation date of the club. Its current coach is Aldo Cruz.

The club celebrated its 10th anniversary in 1992 and its 25th anniversary in 2007.

Its logo has a gold-yellow pointed crest with a thin dark green edge with the club name and the club's location inside and on top, Djunta Mó, the Príncipe Creole form. It has a sky blue colored football (soccer ball) in the middle with two people shaking hands. It also has three stars on the bottom, colored green, red and yellow.

In 1999, the club won their first regional cup title and played in the national semis where they were placed at the time, they lost a match at that round and was out of the competition. In 2000, the club won the previous round of the regional cup, the club lost at the semi-final stage. In 2001, the club finished fifth and last place. The team won a title in 2003 beating Inter Bom-Bom by 4 points. In regional title totals, it became shared with UDAPB in 2007 and Sporting Príncipe in 2011, up to that time, its title totals were third and last. After Sporting's win in 2012, their totals became fifth.

== Honours ==
- Taça Regional de Príncipe: 1

1999

- Principe Island Championship: 2

2003

== Statistics ==
- Best position: Finalist (national)
- Appearances:
  - National Championships 1
  - Regional Championships: 19
