= Sporting Praia Cruz =

- Full name: Sporting Clube da Praia Cruz
- Nickname: Os Leões (the Lions)
- Ground: Estádio Nacional 12 de Julho, São Tomé Island, São Tomé and Príncipe
- Capacity: 6,500
- League: São Tomé and Príncipe Championship
- 2025: 2nd
Home colours

Sporting Clube da Praia Cruz is a professional football club that plays in the São Tomé and Príncipe Championship. The team is based in the island of São Tomé. The team has won eight national and six island titles and is the third team in history to claim its first title in 1982. Sporting Portugal are the fathering club of Sporting Praia Cruz and its 82nd affiliate. Other Sporting affiliates are Sporting Príncipe and Sporting São Tomé.

Sporting Praia Cruz is one of the most successful clubs in both São Tomé Island and São Tomé and Príncipe, having won about 32 official titles, 20 are national and the remaining 12 are regional titles. In national championship titles, they have eight, about a quarter of the championship title totals. Of the regional titles, they make about 30% of the total historical winners, nearly half of the totals. In cup titles it is second in the number of total titles won, with six, behind Vitória Riboque who have eight. In super cup titles, about 40% of the total, winning five of the twelve editions played.

== History ==
Sporting won their first insular and national titles along with their first cup in 1982, their second were an island and then a national title won in 1985. They won a treble in 1994, claiming a national, cup, and regional league title. Sporting won their fourth cup title in 1998, and added three more trophies in 1999; their first super cup, the league title, and regional title. In the 2000 season the team won their fifth cup title.

In 2012 Sporting won its sixth insular title after finishing with 48 points, the club challenged the winner of the neighboring island of Príncipe, Sporting do Principe. The match finished in a 3–1 defeat. In 2013 the team completed a treble, winning the league, supercup, and insular titles. These titles allowed them to participate in the 2014 CAF Champions League against Stade Malien of Mali in the preliminaries. The first leg ended in a 3–1 victory, but the second leg ended in a 5–0 defeat and they were eliminated 7–3 on aggregate. Sporting became league champions on October 26, 2015. They later won that years insular title, and then won the national cup on November 30 after defeating Porto Real 6–2 in the island capital. Later they won the regional title and the supercup as well, completing a historic year where they won 5/5 possible trophies.

Through these achievements, Sporting qualified to the 2016 CAF Champions League, but due to financial concerns, the club withdrew. Praia Cruz also played in the 2015 Super Cup held in May 2016, they challenged the national cup runner up Porto Real and won a Super cup title. Praia Cruz won a second straight island title in 2016, in mid-December, they challenged against the winner of Príncipe in the super cup which would be the second Santomean Sporting derby featuring Sporting Príncipe. This time, Praia Cruz would be winners. The club won the first match 1–2 on December 14 and the second match was a two-goal draw on the 20 and with that won their second straight national title, totaling eight and becoming the team with the most league titles won in the country.

Praia Cruz chose not to appear at the 2017 CAF Champions League due to financial problems and as a low club at the continental level. Praia Cruz headed on to the 2016 Super Cup held in April 2017, where they defeated the cup winner UDRA and claimed their second straight Super Cup title.

== Stadium ==
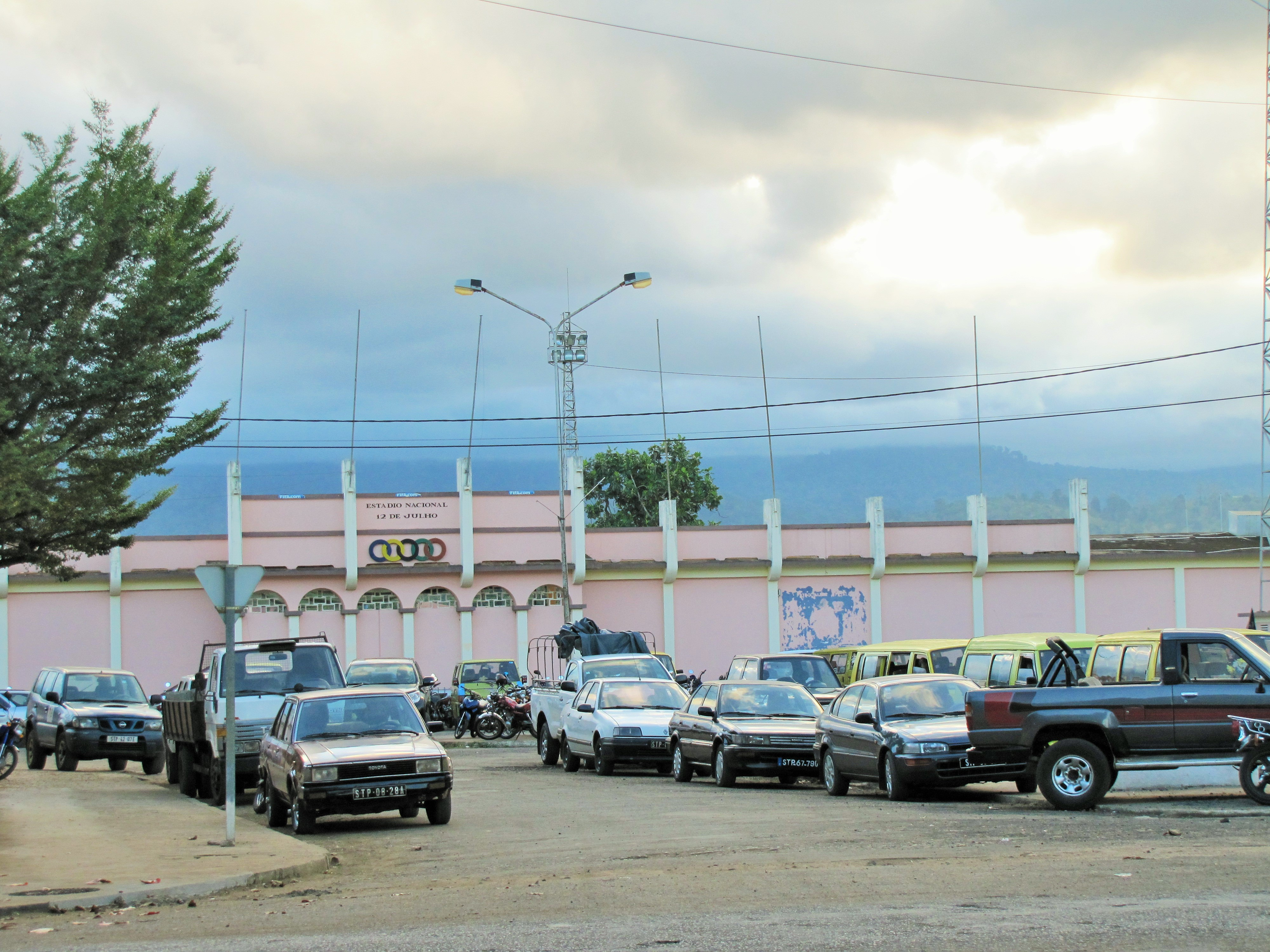
Esádio Nacional 12 de Julho

Estádio Nacional 12 de Julho is a multi-use stadium in São Tomé, São Tomé and Príncipe. It is currently used mostly for football matches. The stadium holds 6,500. The stadium is home to some of the top football clubs in the nation and the island including Praia Cruz, Aliança Nacional. Andorinha and Vitória Riboque. The club also trains and practices at the stadium. Sporting Praia Cruz won league titles in front of hundreds of spectators.

== Crest ==
The official crest was identical to Sporting Clube de Portugal's old crest (also known as Sporting Portugal), the logo is different to other Sporting's crests, examples included Praia, Cape Verde, Bissau, Guinea-Bissau and Luanda, Angola, its crest is that of the town's crest. Its crest has a shield and is colored green and features a lion with a soccer ball on the left.

== Uniform ==
Its shirt are supplied by Adidas. Its uniform colors are green for home, yellow as a second color and blue as its third. The home uniform has two yellow stripes on the top sleeve and a large one on the rims, The shorts rim and the sock top also has two yellow lines. It is oppositely green for its second color. The third color has a longer sky blue stripes, two of them on top and without rims, the shorts and sock's stripes are the same as the other two.

Its former uniform was a green (coloured like tourmaline)-white T-shirt with green socks striped at the top and a black shorts for home games and a pastel green short, green shirt and green socks which were colored black for away games. Its later uniform would be a yellow shirt with green sleeve and collar edges, green shorts and socks for home games, a white T-shirt with black shorts and green socks for away games and a half white half black T-shirt with white shorts and green socks for alternate uniform when another team has a uniform colored white. The uniform is now different than Sporting Lisbon and its colors relates to its own logo. Until 2014, its uniform were identical to its fathering club, Sporting Clube de Portugal. Between 2014 and 2015, its home uniform is yellow with green stripes on the shirt top edges and a green short and socks and its away/alternate uniform features a striped green-white shirt with green sleeves and green socks.

Home uniform in around 2012 and 2014	Home uniform from 2014 to 2016	Away uniform from 2014 to 2016

== Honours ==
- National:
  - São Tomé and Príncipe Championships: 8

1982, 1985, 1994, 1999, 2007, 2013, 2015, 2016

  - Taça Nacional de São Tomé e Principe: 6

1982, 1993, 1994, 1998, 2000, 2015

  - São Tomé and Príncipe Super Cup: 5

1999, 2000, 2013, 2015, 2016

- Regional:
  - São Tomé Island League: 9

1982, 1985, 1994, 1999, 2007, 2012, 2013, 2015, 2016

  - Taça Regional de São Tomé: 3

1982, 1994, 2015

- Other:
  - São Tomé and Príncipe Solidarity Cup: 1

1999

== League and cup history ==
=== Performance in African competitions ===
Sporting Praia Cruz's results in CAF competition
Season	Competition	Qualification method	Round	Opposition	Home	Away	Aggregate
2014	CAF Champions League	São Tomé and Príncipe champions	Preliminary Round	(Mali) Stade Malien	3–2	5–0	3–7
2016	CAF Champions League	São Tomé and Príncipe champions	Preliminary Round	(Nigeria) Warri Wolves FC			abd. (Note: Sporting Praia Cruz abandoned the tournament primarily to financial concerns)

=== Island championships ===
Season	Div.	Pos.	Pl.	W	D	L	GS	GA	GD	P	Cup	Qualification/relegation
2011	2	2	21	12	4	5	41	23	+18	40		None
2012	2	1	18	16	0	2	40	12	+28	48		Advanced into the 2012 National Championship
2013	2	1	18	14	4	0	56	8	+48	46	Quarterfinals	Advanced into the 2013 National Championship
2014	2	2	18	-	-	-	-	-	-	-		None
2015	2	1	18	10	5	3	29	14	+15	35	Nat. Winner	Advanced into the 2015 National Championships
2016	2	1	22	17	2	3	45	16	-29	53		Advanced into the 2016 National Championships
2017	2	2	22	11	7	4	49	28	+21	40	Finalist	None

== Statistics ==
- Best position: Preliminary Round (continental)
- Best position at cup competitions: 1st (national)
- Best position at an opening tournament: 1st
- Appearances at a Super cup competition: 6
- Appearances:
  - National: 9
  - Regional: 32
- Highest number of points in a season: 53, in 2016

== Current squad ==
As of October 2016

== See also ==
- Sporting Clube do Príncipe, another Sporting Club in the nation located in the island of Príncipe
- Sporting Clube de São Tomé, another Sporting Club also based on the island, once an all-island club, the club serves the city and the district
