= Santo António =

- Town
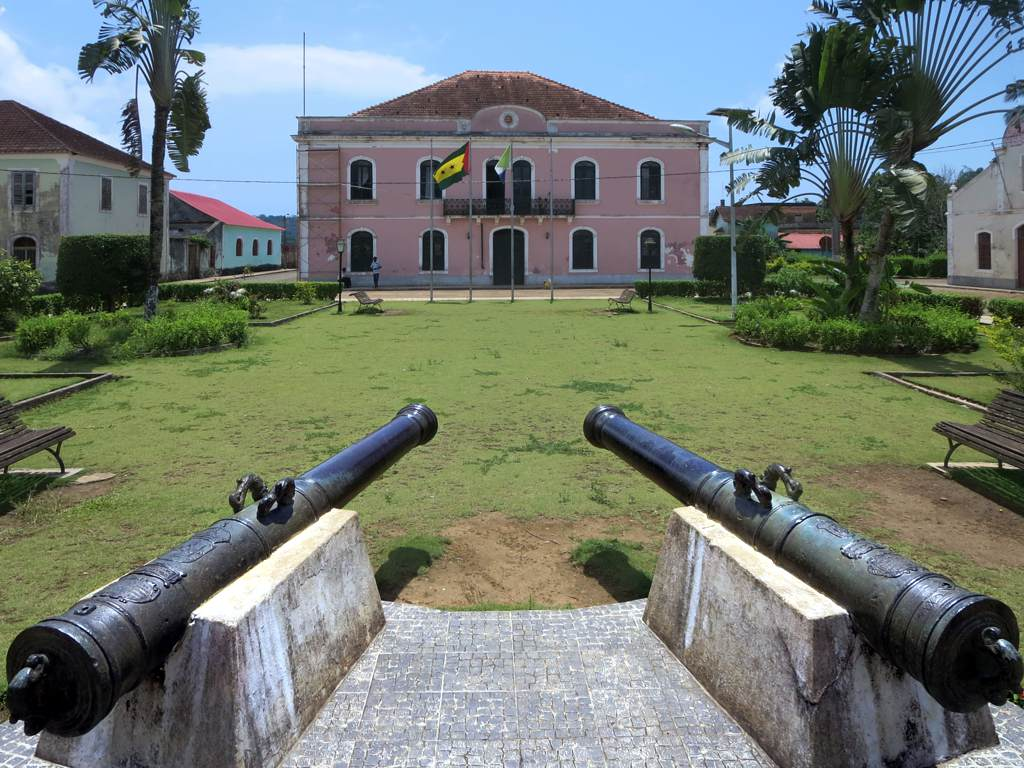
- Palace of the Regional Government

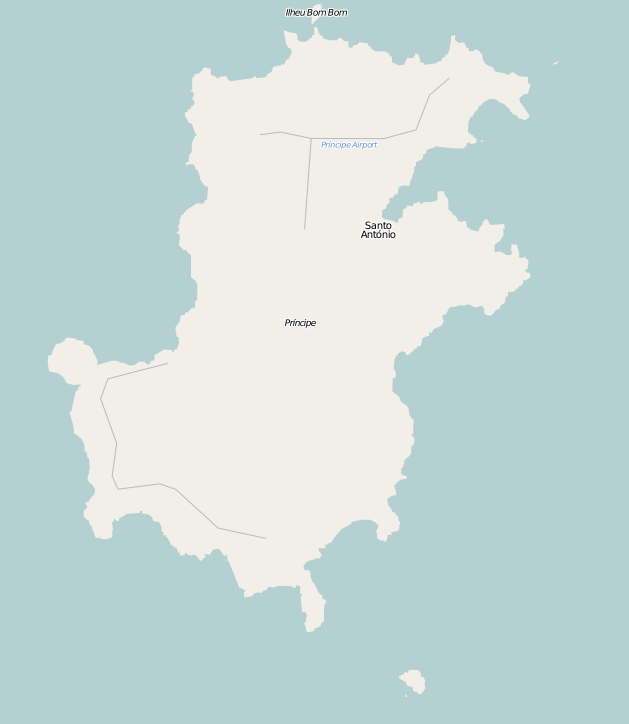
- Location on Príncipe Island Santo António (São Tomé and Príncipe)
- Coordinates: 1°38′12″N 7°25′04″E
- Country: São Tomé and Príncipe
- Autonomous Region: Príncipe

Population (2012)
  - Total: 2,620
- Time zone: UTC+1 (WAT)

Santo António (Portuguese for Saint Anthony), also known as Santo António do Príncipe, is the main settlement of the island of Príncipe in São Tomé and Príncipe. It lies on the north east coast. It is the capital of the Autonomous Region of Príncipe. Its population is 2,620 (2012), about 35% of the island's population. The town is known for its colonial architecture and for its churches: Church of Our Lady of the Conception and Church of Our Lady of the Rosary. The town is also known for the Auto das Floripes play, which is performed by the citizens.

== History ==
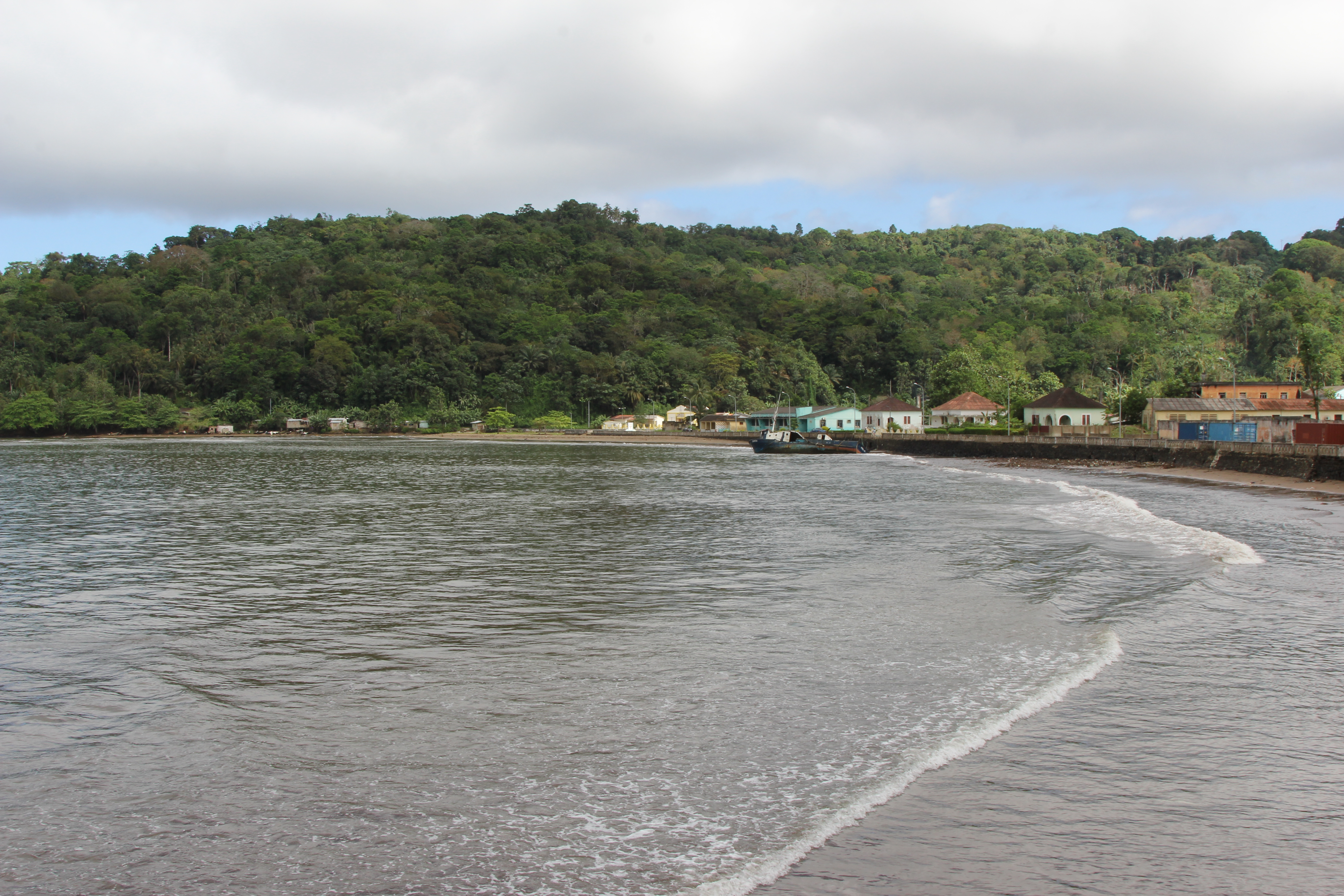
View of Santo António

Historical population
| Year | Pop. | ±% |
|---|---|---|
| 2001 | 1,010 | — |
| 2012 | 2,620 | +159.4% |

The town Santo António was founded in 1502, and was a centre of sugarcane cultivation. In 1695, the Fort of Ponta da Mina was built at the entrance of the bay of Santo António. The town and the fortress were destroyed by French privateers in 1706. From 1753 until 1852, it was the colonial capital of Portuguese São Tomé and Príncipe.

== Climate ==
Santo António has a tropical monsoon climate, with very warm to hot temperatures and oppressive humidity year-round. The average temperature is 24.8 °C or 76.6 °F. The average annual rainfall is 1,872 millimetres or 74 inches, with the least rain in July and the most in October.

Climate data for Santo Antonio
| Month | Jan | Feb | Mar | Apr | May | Jun | Jul | Aug | Sep | Oct | Nov | Dec | Year |
|---|---|---|---|---|---|---|---|---|---|---|---|---|---|
| Mean daily maximum °C (°F) | 29.0 (84.2) | 29.6 (85.3) | 29.6 (85.3) | 29.4 (84.9) | 28.8 (83.8) | 27.6 (81.7) | 26.8 (80.2) | 27.1 (80.8) | 27.4 (81.3) | 27.5 (81.5) | 28.2 (82.8) | 28.6 (83.5) | 28.3 (82.9) |
| Daily mean °C (°F) | 25.5 (77.9) | 24.8 (76.6) | 25.8 (78.4) | 25.8 (78.4) | 25.4 (77.7) | 24.2 (75.6) | 23.5 (74.3) | 23.8 (74.8) | 24.3 (75.7) | 24.4 (75.9) | 24.8 (76.6) | 25.2 (77.4) | 24.8 (76.6) |
| Mean daily minimum °C (°F) | 22.0 (71.6) | 20.0 (68.0) | 22.0 (71.6) | 22.1 (71.8) | 21.9 (71.4) | 20.7 (69.3) | 20.2 (68.4) | 20.4 (68.7) | 21.2 (70.2) | 21.4 (70.5) | 21.4 (70.5) | 21.8 (71.2) | 21.2 (70.2) |
| Average rainfall mm (inches) | 113 (4.4) | 105 (4.1) | 186 (7.3) | 233 (9.2) | 229 (9.0) | 89 (3.5) | 21 (0.8) | 36 (1.4) | 146 (5.7) | 398 (15.7) | 174 (6.9) | 142 (5.6) | 1,872 (73.6) |
| Average rainy days (≥ 0.1 mm) | 14 | 11 | 16 | 18 | 18 | 14 | 7 | 12 | 21 | 25 | 18 | 14 | 188 |
| Average relative humidity (%) | 88 | 86 | 86 | 87 | 88 | 83 | 83 | 83 | 86 | 89 | 88 | 87 | 86 |
Source: Deutscher Wetterdienst

== Transportation ==
Príncipe Airport lies 3 km north of the town. It offers flights to São Tomé International Airport on STP Airways and Africa's Connection STP.

== Sports ==
The town has the only sports facility on the island, Estádio Regional 13 de Junho. The facility is home to the football clubs Sporting Clube do Príncipe and GD Os Operários.

== Twin towns ==
Santo António is twinned with the Portuguese cities of Aveiro and Faro.
