= List of football clubs in São Tomé and Príncipe =

For a complete list see Category:Football clubs in São Tomé and Príncipe

The following is an incomplete list of association football clubs based in São Tomé and Príncipe.

== Key ==
Key to Divisional Change
New club
Club was promoted to a higher level,
winner or runner-up of each regional league qualified into the National Championships
Club was transferred between divisions at the same level
Club resigned or was demoted to a lower level
Club was relegated to a lower level
Lowest division contains only a single division

== 0-9 ==
Club	Location	League/Division (Regional)	Lvl	Change from 2016
1o de Maio	Nova Estrela	Príncipe Regional Championships	2	
6 de Setembro	Santana	São Tomé Regional Championships	2	
Agrosport	Monte Café	São Tomé	1	
FC Aliança Nacional	Pantufo	São Tomé Regional Premier Division	2	
Amador	Agostinho Neto	Sāo Tomé Regional Second Division	2	
Andorinha SC	Ponta Mina	São Tomé Regional Third Division	3	Relegated to the Regional Third Division
Bairros Unidos FC	Caixão Grande	São Tomé Regional Premier Division	2	
Boavista FC de São Tome	São Tomé	São Tomé Regional Second Division	3	Promoted into the Regional Second Division
CD Guadalupe	Guadalupe	Sáo Tomé Regional Second Division	3	
UD Correia		São Tomé Regional Premier Division	2	
Cruz Vermelha	Almeirim	São Tomé Regional Third Division	4	
Desportivo Condé		São Tomé Regional Third Division	4	
Desportivo Marítimo	Micolò	São Tomé Regional Third Division	4	Relegated to the Regional Second Division
(Porto) Folha Fede	Folha Fede	São Tomé Regional Premier Division	2	
Inter FC	Bom Bom	São Tomé Regional Premier Division	2	
Juba Diogo Simão	Diogo Simão	São Tomé Regional Second Division	3	Withdrawn from competition
Kê Morabeza		São Tomé Regional Second Division	3	
FC Neves	Neves	São Tomé Regional Premier Division	2	
Oque d'El Rey	Oque d'El Rei	São Tomé Regional Second Division	3	
Os Operários	Santo António	Príncipe Island Championships	2	
Ototó		São Tomé Regional Third Division	4	
Palmar		São Tomé Regional Second Division	3	Promoted to the Regional Second Division
Porto Alegre	Porto Alegre	São Tomé Regional Second Division	4	
FC Porto Real	Porto Real	Príncipe Regional Championships	2	
Ribeira Peixe	Ribeira Peixe	São Tomé Regional Second Division	3	
Santa Margarida		São Tomé Regional Third Division	4	
Santana FC	Santana	São Tomé Regional Second Division	3	Relegated to the Regional Second Division
Sporting Príncipe	Santo António	Príncipe Island Championships	2	
Sporting São Tomé	São Tomé	São Tomé Regional Second Division	4	Promoted to the Regional Second Division
Sporting Praia Cruz	Praia Cruz	São Tomé Premier Division	2	
GD Sundy	Santo António	Príncipe Regional Championships	2	
Trindade	Trindade	São Tomé Premier Division	2	
UDAPB	Picão	Príncipe Regional Championships	2	
UDESCAI	Água Izé	São Tomé Premier Division	2	Promoted to the Regional Premier Division
UDRA	São João dos Angolares	São Tomé Premier Division	2	
Varzim FC		São Tomé Third Division	2	
Diogo Vaz	Diogo Vaz	São Tomé Third Division	2	
Vitória FC	Riboque	São Tomé Premier Division	2	
