= 2011 São Tomé Second Division =

São Tomé Second Division
- Season: 2011
- Champions: Vitória FC (Riboque)
- Promoted: Agrosport; Aliança Nacional
- Relegated: None

The 2011 São Tomé (Island or Regional) Second Division took place that season.

The division featured two zones (sometimes as groups), A & B. The first place of each zone heads to the Second Division championships and the winner was crowned Second Division Champions, all of its finals participants qualified into the Premier Division in the following season including Futebol Club Aliança Nacional (Zone A) and Agrosport (Zone B). Agrosport won the Second Division title after succeeding in away goals as the first leg had a goal draw while the second leg was scoreless.

It was also the final season that each of the last placed clubs of each group were not relegated, the Third Division was created in the following season on the island.

== Teams ==
Location of teams in the São Tomé 2011 .

=== Zone A ===
- Futebol Club Aliança Nacional - succeeded into the final
- Inter Bom-Bom
- Os Dinâmicos - Folha Fede
- Juba Diogo Simão
- Palmar
- Porto Alegre
- Santa Margarida
- Trindade FC
- Varzim FC - Ribeira Afonso

=== Zone B ===
- Agrosport - Monte Café - succeeded into the final
- Amador - Agostinho Neto
- Andorinha Sport Club
- Bela Vista - in the following season, the club would change its name to Kë Morabeza
- Desportivo Conde
- Correia
- Diogo Vaz
- Desportivo Marítimo - Micoló
- Sporting São Tomé

São Tomé First Division 2011
Champions
Agrosport
