= 2016 São Tomé Second Division =

São Tomé Second Division
- Season: 2016
- Champions: FC Neves
- Promoted: 6 de Setembro; Ribeira Peixe
- Relegated: Marítimo Micoló; Juba Diogo Simão
- Matches played: 90
- Goals scored: 252 (2.8 per match)

The 2016 São Tomé (Island or Regional) Second Division was a third tier competition that took place that season. The club had 10 clubs, the competition began on 21 May and finished on 13 November. Geographically almost all clubs but Água Izé were from the north. FC Neves won the title and participated into the Premier Division in the following season, alongside second placed UDESCAI. A total of 90 matches were played and 291 goals were scored, higher than last season.

On the opposites, both Marítimo Micoló and Juba Diogo Simão were relegated into the Third Division in the following season as they were the last placed clubs. Juba Diogo Simão withdrew in the following season and will return for the 2018 Third Division. UDESCAI will return into the Second Division for 2018 as they were the last two placed clubs of the upper regional division.

Next season, 6 de Setembro and Ribeira Peixe were promoted into the Second Division as they were the top Third Division clubs of the season.

== Overview ==
Sporting São Tomé scored the most goals numbering 49, second was FC Neves with 46 and third was UDESCAI with 36, and fourth was Amador with 31 Marítimo Micoló scored the least with only eight goals. On the opposites, Juba Diogo Simão conceded the most with 54, second was Boavista Uba Budo with 46 and third was sixth placed Palmar with 33.

== Teams ==
Location of teams in the São Tomé Second Division 2016, some are not listed

The second division featured 10 clubs.

Club	City	District
Amador	Agostinho Neto	Lobata
Boavista Uba Budo (Promoted)	Uba Budo	Cantagalo
CD Guadalupe	Guadalupe	Lobata
Micoló	Micoló	Lobata
Oque del Rei	Oque del Rei	Lobata
Juba Diogo Simão (Relegated)	Diogo Simão	Mé-Zóchi
FC Neves	Neves	Lembá
Palmar (Promoted after withdrawal)		
Sporting São Tomé (Promoted)	São Tomé	Água Grande
UDESCAI (Promoted)	Água Izé	Cantagalo

=== Division table ===
Pos	Team	Pld	W	D	L	GF	GA	GD	Pts	Qualification or relegation
1	FC Neves	18	13	1	4	46	14	+32	40	Qualification for 2017 São Tomé First Division
2	UDESCAI	18	12	2	4	36	22	+14	38	Qualification for 2017 São Tomé First Division
3	Amador	18	10	3	5	31	20	+11	33	
4	Sporting São Tomé	18	10	2	6	49	28	+21	32	
5	CD Guadalupe	18	8	5	5	28	24	+4	29	
6	Palmar	18	7	3	8	21	33	−12	24	
7	Oque d'El Rei	17	4	4	9	16	26	−10	16	
8	Boavista Uba Budo	17	4	2	11	23	46	−23	14	
9	Marítimo Micoló (R)	17	1	8	8	17	26	−9	11	Relegation to 2017 São Tomé Island Third Division
10	Juba Diogo Simão (R)	18	1	5	12	18	54	−36	8	Relegation to 2017 São Tomé Island Third Division

Updated to match(es) played on 17 November 2016. Source: São Tomé Second Division results 2016
Rules for classification: 1) points; 2) goal difference; 3) number of goals scored.
(R) Relegated

São Tomé Second Division 2016
champions
FC Neves
