= 2015 São Tomé Second Division =

São Tomé Second Division
- Season: 2015
- Champions: Agrosport
- Promoted: Agrosport; Trindade FC; Inter Bom-Bom; Ké Morabeza
- Relegated: FC Ribeira Peixe; Porto Alegre
- Matches played: 90
- Goals scored: 252 (2.8 per match)

The 2015 São Tomé (Island or Regional) Second Division was a third-tier competition that took place that season. The club had 10 clubs, the competition began on 9 May and finished on 28 October. Geographically almost all clubs but Porto Alegre and Ribeira Peixe were from the north. Agrosport won the title and participated in the Premier Division in the following season, as the number of clubs in that division had risen to 12, four clubs qualified alongside Trindade, Inter Bom Bom and Ké Morabeza (formerly Boa Vista). A total of 90 matches were played and 252 goals were scored.

On the opposites, both Ribeira Peixe and Porto Alegre were relegated into the Third Division in the following season as they were the last placed clubs.

== Overview ==
Agrosport scored the most goals numbering 39, second was Trindade FC with 38 and third was Inter Bom Bom with 33. Ribeira Peixe scored the least with ten. On the opposites, Juba Diogo Simão conceded the most with 55, second was Oque d'El Rei with 33 and third was Ribeira Peixe with 30.

In the following season, four clubs would be promoted as the Third Division would be reduced to 10 teams. Palmar, Boavista Uba Bodo, Sporting São Tomé and Ototó were promoted.

== Teams ==
Location of teams in the São Tomé Second Division 2015, some are not listed

The second division featured 10 clubs.

Club	City	District
Agrosport	Monte Café	Mé-Zóchi
Amador	Agostinho Neto	Lobata
CD Guadalupe	Guadalupe	Lobata
Kê Morabeza	Bela Vista	Lobata
Inter Bom-Bom	Bom-Bom	Mé-Zóchi
Micoló	Micoló	Lobata
Oque d'El Rei	Oque del Rei	Lobata
Porto Alegre	Porto Alegre	Caué
Ribeira Peixe	Ribeira Peixe	Caué
Trindade (Newly Promoted)	Trindade	Mé-Zóchi

=== Division table ===
Pos	Team	Pld	W	D	L	GF	GA	GD	Pts	Qualification or relegation
1	Agrosport	18	13	2	3	39	17	+22	41	Qualification for 2016 São Tomé First Division
2	Trindade FC	18	12	3	3	38	13	+25	39	Qualification for 2016 São Tomé First Division
3	Inter Bom-Bom	18	12	2	4	33	15	+18	38	Qualification for 2016 São Tomé First Division
4	Kê Morabeza	18	10	3	5	26	16	+10	33	Qualification for 2016 São Tomé First Division
5	CD Guadalupe	18	9	1	8	24	22	+2	28	
6	Oque d'El Rei	18	7	3	8	21	33	−12	24	
7	Marítimo Micoló	18	5	5	8	20	24	−4	20	
8	Amador	18	4	5	9	22	27	−5	17	
9	Ribeira Peixe (R)	18	2	3	13	10	30	−20	9	Relegation to São Tomé Island Third Division
10	Porto Alegre (R)	18	2	1	15	19	55	−36	7	Relegation to São Tomé Island Third Division

Updated to match(es) played on 1 November 2015. Source: São Tomé Second Division results 2015
Rules for classification: 1) points; 2) goal difference; 3) number of goals scored.
(R) Relegated

São Tomé Second Division 2015
champions
Agrosport
