= 2012 São Tomé and Príncipe Championship =

São Tomé and Principe Championship
- Season: 2012
- Champions: Sporting Praia Cruz
- Matches: 2

Location of teams in the São Tomé and Príncipe Championship 2012.

The 2012 São Tomé and Principe Championship was the 27th season of the São Tomé and Principe Championship the top-level football championship of São Tomé and Principe. It began on 1 May and concluded on 5 November. Sporting Clube do Principe from São Tomé island won their second title.

== Teams ==
15 teams participated in the São Tomé and Principe Championship, 10 from São Tomé Island and 5 from Príncipe Island. At the end of season champion of São Tomé Island League and champion of Principe Island League play one match for champion of São Tomé and Principe.

== São Tomé teams 2012 ==
=== First Division ===
==== Second Division ====
The Second Division featured two zones (sometimes as groups), A & B. The first place of each zone heads to the Second Division championships and the winner was crowned Second Division Champions, all of its finals participants qualified into the Premier Division in the following season including Futebol Club Aliança Nacional (Zone A) and Agrosport (Zone B).

===== Zone A =====
- Inter Bom-Bom
- Os Dinâmicos/Porto - Folha Fede
- Juba Diogo Simão
- Palmar
- Porto Alegre
- FC Ribeira Peixe
- Santa Margarida
- Santana FC
- Trindade FC
- Varzim FC - Ribeira Afonso

===== Zone B =====
- Amador - Agostinho Neto
- Andorinha Sport Club
- Desportivo Conde
- Correia
- CD Guadalupe
- Kê Morabeza - in the following season, the club would change its name to Kë Morabeza
- Desportivo Marítimo - Micoló
- FC Neves
- Sporting São Tomé
- Diogo Vaz

==== Third Division ====
It was the first season that featured the Third Division.

== Principe teams 2012 ==
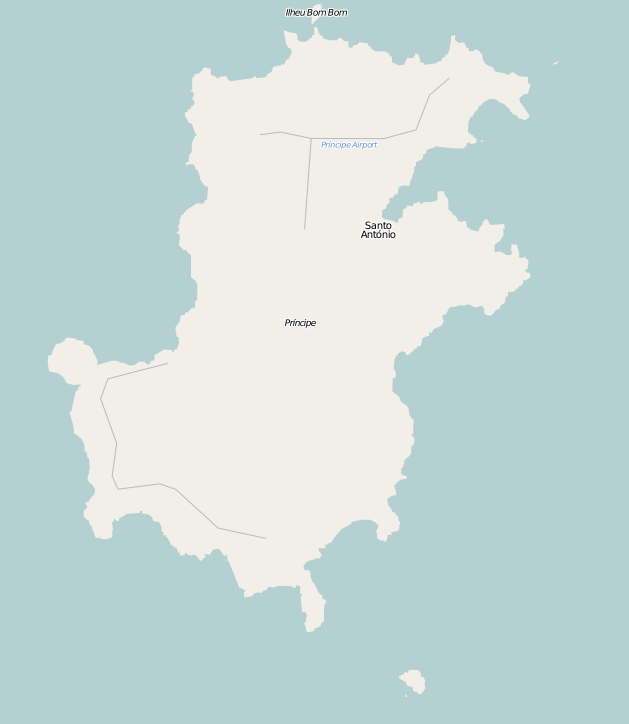
Location of teams in the Principe 2012.

Five clubs took part, FC Porto Real did not participated during the season which reduced the number of matches to eight. The competition started in May and finished in October. Sporting won the 2012 title and participated in the national championship match in November. Sporting defeated UDAPB 1–0 in the final match of the season.

Club	City	District
1º de Maio	Santo António	Pagué
GD Os Operários	Santo António	Pagué
Sporting Clube do Príncipe	Santo António	Pagué
GD Sundy (Current champions)	Sundy	Pagué
UDAPB	Picão	Pagué

== National final ==
The national final match took place on 5 November 2012 at noon. The match featured Sporting from Príncipe and Sporting Praia Cruz, it was the "Sporting" challenge. Every goal were scored in the last few minutes of the match. The first were scored by Remi Lima at the 86th minute, the second was a penalty kick which was scored by Sporting Praia's Jair which tied up the game, at additional time, Remy Lima scored the last two goals and Sporting Príncipe went on to win their second in a row and most recent national title and qualified into the 2013 CAF Champions League.

5 November 2005

Sporting Clube do Príncipe	3:1	Sporting Praia Cruz
Remy Lima 86' 90+1' 90+2'		Jair 87' (pen)

Estádio 13 de Junho
Santo António

Winner

2nd title
