= 2016 São Tomé Third Division =

São Tomé Third Division
- Season: 2016
- Champions: 6 de Setembro
- Promoted: 6 de Setembro; FC Ribeira Peixe
- Matches: 90
- Goals: 281 (3.12 per match)

The 2016 São Tomé (Island or Regional) Second Division was the third season of the fourth-tier competition that took place that season, also being the nation's lowest. The club was the first that featured ten clubs. 6 de Setembro won the title and participated in the Second Division in the following season, second placed FC Ribeira Peixe was also promoted A total of 85 out of 90 matches were played with the final round not played and 281 goals were scored.

== Overview ==
6 de Setembro scored the most goals numbering 48, second was fifth placed Andorinha with 32 and third was Ribeira Peixe with 31. The fewest was sixth placed Conde with 20 and third was Porto Alegre with 21. On the opposites, Cruz Vermelha conceded the most with 48, second most was Varzim with 27 and third most was Porto Alegre with 35. The fewest goals conceded was Ribeira Peixe with 15, second least was 6 de Setembro with 17.

== Teams ==
Location of teams in the 2014 São Tomé Third (Honour) Division.

Club	City	District
6 de Setembro (Returned after withdrawal)	Santana	Cantagalo
Andorinha	Ponta Mina, São Tomé	Água Grande
Conde	Conde, São Tomé and Príncipe	Lobata
Cruz Vermelha	Almeirim	Água Grande
Diogo Vaz	Diogo Vaz	Lembá
Ototó	Ototó	Me-Zochi
Porto Alegre (Note: Also as Benfica de Porto Alegre) (Relegated)	Porto Alegre	Caué
FC Ribeira Peixe (Relegated)	Ribeira Peixe	Caué
Santa Margarida	Santa Margarida	Me-Zochi
Varzim FC	Ribeira Afonso	Cantagalo

=== Division table ===
Pos	Team	Pld	W	D	L	GF	GA	GD	Pts	Qualification
1	6 de Setembro	17	12	3	2	48	17	+31	39	Qualification for 2017 São Tomé Second Division
2	FC Ribeira Peixe	17	10	5	2	31	15	+16	35	Qualification for 2017 São Tomé Second Division
3	Santa Margarida	17	7	6	4	22	21	+1	27	
4	Diogo Vaz FC	17	8	1	8	29	27	+2	25	
5	Andorinha SC	17	7	3	7	32	31	+1	24	
6	Desp. Conde	16	7	3	6	20	23	−3	24	
7	Ototó	17	6	3	8	25	27	−2	21	
8	Varzim FC	17	4	6	7	25	37	−12	18	
9	GD Cruz Vermelha	17	4	3	10	28	48	−20	15	
10	Porto Alegre	16	2	1	13	21	35	−14	7	

Updated to match(es) played on 1 November 2016. Source: São Tomé Third Division results 2016
Rules for classification: 1) points; 2) goal difference; 3) number of goals scored.

São Tomé Second Division 2016
champions

1st title
