= 2017 São Tomé First Division =

São Tomé First Division
- Season: 2017
- Champions: UDRA
- Relegated: UD Correia; UDESCAI
- Matches played: 132
- Goals scored: 410 (3.11 per match)

The 2017 São Tomé (Island or Regional) First Division was the competition of the Santomean Football Federation's São Tome section that took place that season. The club had 12 clubs. the competition began in 22 April and finished on 29 October. Geographically all clubs that took part in the Premier Division were in the east and almost all but UDRA were in the northeast where the regional and national capital is located. UDRA won their second and recent title (their next title in three years) and almost a month later headed to the national champions to win their national title.

== Overview ==
A total of 132 matches were played and 362 goals were scored, more than half than last season.

UD Correia and UDESCAI were relegated from the Premier Division as they finished in the last two positions. Sporting São Tomé and 6 de Setembro were champions of the Second Division and were promoted into the division for the following season and will participate.

Sporting Praia Cruz scored the most goals numbering 49, second was UDRA with 47. third was Bairros Unidos and fourth was Trindade with 38. On the opposites, UDESCAI conceded the most with 45 followed by Inter Bom-Bom with 42 and 7th placed Trindade and 10th placed Agrosport with 41.

== Teams ==
Location of teams in the São Tomé Premier Division of 2017.

Club	City	District
Agrosport	Monte Café	Mé-Zóchi
Aliança Nacional	Pantufo	Água Grande
Bairros Unidos FC	Caixão Grande	Mé-Zóchi
UD Correia	Correia	Lobata
Inter Bom-Bom	Bom-Bom	Mé-Zóchi
FC Neves (Promoted)	Neves	Lembá
Porto de Folha Fede	Folha Fede	Me-Zochi
Sporting Praia Cruz (Current champions)	São Tomé	Água Grande
Trindade	Trindade	Mé-Zóchi
UDRA	São João dos Angolares	Caué
UDESCAI (Promoted)	Pantufo	Água Grande
Vitória FC	Riboque, São Tomé	Água Grande

== Championship table ==
Pos	Team	Pld	W	D	L	GF	GA	GD	Pts	Qualification or relegation
1	UDRA	22	13	7	2	47	20	+27	46	Qualification for 2017 São Tomé and Principe Championship
2	Sporting Praia Cruz	22	11	7	4	49	28	+21	40	
3	Bairros Unidos FC	22	11	6	5	40	37	+3	39	
4	FC Neves	22	10	4	8	35	34	+1	34	
5	Folha Fede (Note: Also known as Porto Folha Fede)	22	9	7	6	36	24	+12	34	
6	Aliança Nacional	22	9	6	7	26	27	−1	33	
7	Trindade FC	22	7	7	8	38	41	−3	28	
8	Vitória	22	6	8	8	29	29	0	26	
9	Inter Bom Bom	22	7	2	13	27	43	−16	23	
10	Agrosport	22	6	4	12	31	41	−10	22	
11	UD Correia (R)	22	5	6	11	26	37	−11	21	Relegation to São Tomé Island Second Division
12	UDESCAI (R)	22	3	6	13	26	49	−23	15	Relegation to São Tomé Island Second Division

Updated to match(es) played on 2 November 2017. Source: São Tomé results 2017
Rules for classification: 1) points; 2) goal difference; 3) number of goals scored.
(R) Relegated

== Statistics ==
- Highest scoring match and biggest win: UDESCAI 0-8 Porto Folha Fede (October 29)

São Tomé First Division 2015
champions
UDRA
2nd title
