= 2015 São Tomé First Division =

São Tomé First Division
- Season: 2015
- Champions: Sporting Praia Cruz
- Promoted: Agrosport; Trindade FC; Inter Bom-Bom; Kě Morabeza
- Relegated: FC Neves; Juba Diogo Simão
- Matches played: 90
- Goals scored: 231 (2.57 per match)

The 2015 São Tomé (Island or Regional) First Division took place that season. The division had 10 clubs and appeared in that number for the last time, the competition began in June and finished on 19 November. Geographically almost all clubs but Neves that took part in the Premier Division were in the east. Sporting Praia Cruz won the title and went on to participate in the national championships for the seventh time in November. Sporting Praia Cruz were first crowned as champions on October 26, a round before the season ended. A total of 90 matches were played and 231 goals were scored.

== Overview ==
Agrosport, Trindade, Inter Bom Bom and Ké Morabeza (formerly Bela Vista) were in the top four of the Second Division with Agrosport winning the title.

Both Neves and Juba Diogo Simão were relegated into the Second Division in the following season as they were the last placed clubs. Neves did not return until 2017, Juba Diogo Simão did not return, in 2017, the club withdrew from the Third Division.

Folha Fede scored the most goals numbering 30, second was Sporting Praia Cruz and UDRA with 29, and fourth was 8th placed Correia Juba Diogo Simão scored the least with only eight goals. On the opposites, Juba Diogo Simão conceded the most with 41, second was Neves with 30 and third was Aliança Nacional with 28.

== Teams ==
Location of teams in the São Tomé Premier Division of 2015. Juba Diogo Simão is not mapped here.

Ten clubs participated in the 2014 season (third time since its reduction), Sporting Praia Cruz won their eight and recent title and went on to participate in the national championship match in November 15.

=== Teams ===
Club	City	District
Aliança Nacional	Pantufo	Água Grande
Bairros Unidos FC	Caixão Grande	Mé-Zóchi
UD Correia (Newly Promoted)	Correia	
Folha Fede (Newly Promoted)	Folha Fede	
Juba Diogo Simão	Diogo Simão	
FC Neves	Neves	Lembá
Santana FC	Santana	Cantagalo
Sporting Praia Cruz	São Tomé	Água Grande
UDRA (Current champions)	São João dos Angolares	Caué
Vitória FC	São Tomé	Água Grande

Pos	Team	Pld	W	D	L	GF	GA	GD	Pts	Qualification or relegation
1	Sporting Praia Cruz	18	10	5	3	29	14	+15	35	Qualification for 2015 São Tomé and Principe Championship
2	Santana FC	18	7	7	4	19	19	0	28	
3	UDRA	18	7	7	4	29	20	+9	28	
4	Vitória	18	7	6	5	24	22	+2	27	
5	Folha Fede (Note: Also known as Porto Folha Fede)	18	7	6	5	30	15	+15	27	
6	Caixão Grande	18	7	5	6	22	17	+5	26	
7	Aliança Nacional	18	6	6	6	22	28	−6	24	
8	UD Correia	18	5	6	7	27	25	+2	21	
9	FC Neves (R)	18	6	2	10	21	30	−9	20	Relegation to São Tomé Island Second Division
10	Juba Diogo Simão (R)	18	1	4	13	8	41	−33	7	Relegation to São Tomé Island Second Division

Updated to match(es) played on 1 November 2015. Source: São Tomé results 2015
Rules for classification: 1) points; 2) goal difference; 3) number of goals scored.
(R) Relegated
Notes:

São Tomé First Division 2015
champions
Sporting Praia Cruz
7th title
