= 2017 São Tomé Second Division =

São Tomé Second Division
- Season: 2017
- Champions: Sporting São Tomé
- Promoted: Sporting São Tomé; 6 de Setembro
- Relegated: Kě Morabeza; Boavista Uba Budo
- Matches: 90
- Goals: 338 (3.76 per match)

The 2017 São Tomé (Island or Regional) Second Division was a third their competition that took place that season. The club had 10 clubs, the competition began on 21 May and finished on 13 November. Geographically almost all clubs but Ribeira Peixe and Guadalupe were from the Northeast. Sporting São Tomé won the title and will participate into the Premier Division in the following season, alongside second placed 6 de Setembro. A total of 90 matches were played and 338 goals were scored, higher than the previous two seasons.

On the opposites, both Kě Morabeza and Boavista Uba Budo were relegated into the Third Division in the following season as they were the last placed clubs.

Next season, Ototó and Cruz Vermelha were promoted into the Second Division as they were the top Third Division clubs of the season.

== Overview ==
Sporting São Tomé scored the most goals numbering 71, a high unseen in the Second Division in seasons, second was 6 de Setembro with 42, third was Guadalupe with 37 and fourth was Santana with 34. Kě Morabeza scored the least with only 13 goals. On the opposites, Boavista Uba Budo conceded the most with 58, second was 8th placed Oque do Rei with 37 and third was 7th placed Amador with 36.

== Teams ==
Location of teams in the São Tomé Second Division of 2017.

Club	City	District
6 de Setembro (Promoted)	Santana	Cantagalo
Amador	Agostinho Neto	
Boavista Uba Budo	Uba Budo	
CD Guadalupe	Guadalupe	Lobata
Oque del Rei	Oque del Rei	Lobata
Desportivo Ké Morabeza (Relegated)		
Palmar		
Ribeira Peixe (Promoted)	Ribeira Peixe	Caué
Santana FC (Relegated)	Santana	Cantagalo
Sporting São Tomé (Promoted)	São Tomé	Água Grande

=== Division table ===
Pos	Team	Pld	W	D	L	GF	GA	GD	Pts	Qualification or relegation
1	Sporting São Tomé	18	13	3	2	71	31	+40	42	Qualification for 2018 São Tomé Island First Division
2	6 de Setembro	18	12	4	2	42	20	+22	40	Qualification for 2018 São Tomé Island First Division
3	CD Guadalupe	18	11	6	1	37	12	+25	39	
4	Palmar	18	8	4	6	34	31	+3	28	
5	Ribeira Peixe	18	7	2	9	30	46	−16	23	
6	Santana FC	18	6	5	7	36	33	+3	23	
7	Amador	18	5	3	10	25	36	−11	18	
8	Oque d'El Rei	18	4	5	9	21	37	−16	17	
9	Kê Morabeza (R)	18	4	2	12	13	34	−21	14	Relegation to 2018 São Tomé Island Third Division
10	Boavista Uba Budo (R)	18	3	0	15	29	58	−29	9	Relegation to 2018 São Tomé Island Third Division

Updated to match(es) played on 17 November 2017. Source: São Tomé Second Division results 2017
Rules for classification: 1) points; 2) goal difference; 3) number of goals scored.
(R) Relegated

São Tomé Second Division 2017
champions
