= 2018 São Tomé and Príncipe Championship =

São Tomé and Principe Championship
- Season: 2018
- Champions: UDRA

The 2018 São Tomé and Principe Championship is the 33rd season of the São Tomé and Principe Championship the top-level football championship of São Tomé and Principe.

There are two separate championships, one for teams of São Tomé Island and one for teams of Príncipe Island. The champions of the two island championships play a home-and-away two-legged final to decide the overall champions.

== Regional Leagues ==
=== São Tomé ===
Final table.

Pos	Team	Pld	W	D	L	GF	GA	GD	Pts	Qualification or relegation
1	UDRA	22	14	3	5	52	21	+31	45	Champions
2	Sporting Praia Cruz	22	13	2	7	32	20	+12	41	
3	Trindade FC	22	9	7	6	31	25	+6	34	
4	Vitória Riboque	22	8	7	7	26	27	−1	31	
5	6 de Setembro	22	9	4	9	36	42	−6	31	
6	Aliança Nacional	22	8	6	8	36	32	+4	30	
7	Agrosport	22	8	5	9	36	41	−5	29	
8	Sporting São Tomé	22	8	5	9	31	39	−8	29	
9	Caixão Grande	10	9	0	1	24	31	−7	27	
10	Folha Fede	22	7	7	8	33	32	+1	28	
11	FC Neves	9	8	0	1	27	33	−6	24	Relegation to lower division
12	Inter Bom-Bom	5	2	0	3	15	36	−21	6	Relegation to lower division

Updated to match(es) played on last day of season. Source:

==== Selected results ====
São Tomé's played their next top tier match in a few decades, they suffered their first two losses, first to Agrosport, then to Neves, at the third round, they made a 1-0 win over Vitória Riboque their next at the top tier in decades. The first of three matches that were ăto play on May 5, Folha Fede vs. Aliança Nacional and Caixão Grande and Agrosport were abandoned in the middle of the second half due to heavy rain, they continued on May 9, the first ended in a three goal draw, the second Agrosport won. The third one was Sporting

=== Príncipe ===
Final table.

Pos	Team	Pld	W	D	L	GF	GA	GD	Pts	Qualification or relegation
1	FC Porto Real	20	16	2	2	78	27	+51	50	Champions
2	Operários	20	11	2	7	41	33	+8	35	
3	1º de Maio	20	9	1	10	48	57	−9	28	
4	Sundy	20	7	4	9	40	41	−1	25	
5	Sporting Clube do Príncipe	20	5	3	12	38	57	−19	18	
6	UDAPB	20	5	2	13	36	66	−30	17	

Updated to match(es) played on last day of season. Source:

== National final ==
Team	Qualifying method
UDRA	Champions of São Tomé
Porto Real	Champions of Príncipe

First Leg [Dec 8, Estádio Regional 13 de Junho, Santo António]

Porto Real 2-2 UDRA

Second Leg [Dec 15, Estádio Nacional 12 de Julho, São Tomé]

UDRA 2-1 Porto Real

UDRA win 4-3 on aggregate
