= 2015 São Tomé Third Division =

São Tomé Third Division
- Season: 2015
- Champions: Palmar
- Promoted: Palmar; Boavista Uba Budo; Sporting São Tomé; UDESCAI
- Matches: 96
- Goals: 252 (2.63 per match)

The 2015 São Tomé (Island or Regional) Second Division was the third season of the fourth-tier competition that took place that season, also being the nation's lowest. The club was the third and last that hat 12 clubs. Geographically almost all clubs but Porto Alegre and Ribeira Peixe were from the north. Agrosport won the title and participated in the Second Division in the following season, as the number of clubs in the Premier Division had risen to 12, four clubs qualified alongside Boavista Uba Budo, Sporting São Tomé and Ototó, the Third Division would feature only ten clubs next season. A total of 90 matches were played and 252 goals were scored.

== Overview ==
Sporting São Tomé scored the most goals numbering 30, second was Palmar with 28 and third was Ototó with 26. 6 de Setembro scored the fewest with 10, second fewest was seventh placed Santa Margarida with 16. On the opposites, Andorinha conceded the most with 32, second was Varzim with 31 and third was 6 de Setembro with 26. The fewest goals conceded were Palmar and Sporting São Tomé with 15.

In the following season, four clubs would be promoted as the Third Division would be reduced to 10 teams. Palmar, Boavista Uba Bodo, Sporting São Tomé and Ototó were promoted.

== Teams ==
Location of teams in the 2014 São Tomé Third (Honour) Division.
- Andorinha - finished 10th
- Boavista Uba Budo
- Conde
- Cruz Vermelha
- Diogo Vaz
- Otótó
- Santa Margarida - a new club participated in the national competition and the third division for the first time
- Sporting São Tomé
- UDESCAI
- Varzim

=== Division table ===
Pos	Team	Pld	W	D	L	GF	GA	GD	Pts	Qualification
1	Palmar	16	10	2	4	28	15	+13	32	Qualification for 2016 São Tomé Second Division
2	Boavista Uba Budo	16	9	4	3	25	17	+8	31	Qualification for 2016 São Tomé Second Division
3	Sporting São Tomé	18	12	2	4	33	15	+18	38	Qualification for 2016 São Tomé Second Division
4	Ototó	26	18	2	6	26	22	+4	56	Qualification for 2016 São Tomé Second Division
5	Desp. Conde	16	7	4	5	19	18	+1	25	
6	UDESCAI	16	6	6	4	21	25	−4	24	
7	Santa Margarida	16	6	3	7	16	17	−1	21	
8	GD Cruz Vermelha	16	5	5	6	20	20	0	20	
9	Diogo Vaz FC	15	5	3	7	23	21	+2	18	
10	Andorinha SC	16	3	4	9	17	32	−15	13	
11	Varzim FC	16	2	6	8	24	21	+3	12	
12	6 de Setembro	16	2	5	9	10	26	−16	11	

Updated to match(es) played on 27 September 2015. Source: São Tomé Third Division results 2015
Rules for classification: 1) points; 2) goal difference; 3) number of goals scored.

São Tomé Second Division 2015
champions

1st title
