= São José, São Tomé and Príncipe =

São José
- Village
- Location on São Tomé Island
- Coordinates: 0.294°N 6.501°E
- Country: São Tomé and Príncipe
- Island: São Tomé
- District: Lembá

Population (2012)
  - Total: 98
- Time zone: UTC+1 (WAT)

São José (Portuguese for Saint Joseph) is a village in the western part of São Tomé Island in São Tomé and Príncipe. Its population is 98 (2012 census). It lies 2.5 km south of Diogo Vaz, 4 km northeast of Santa Catarina and 9 km southwest of Neves.

== Population history ==
Historical population
Year	Pop.	±%
2001	72	—
2008	82	+13.9%
2012	98	+19.5%
