= Pico de São Tomé =

Highest mountain in São Tomé and Príncipe

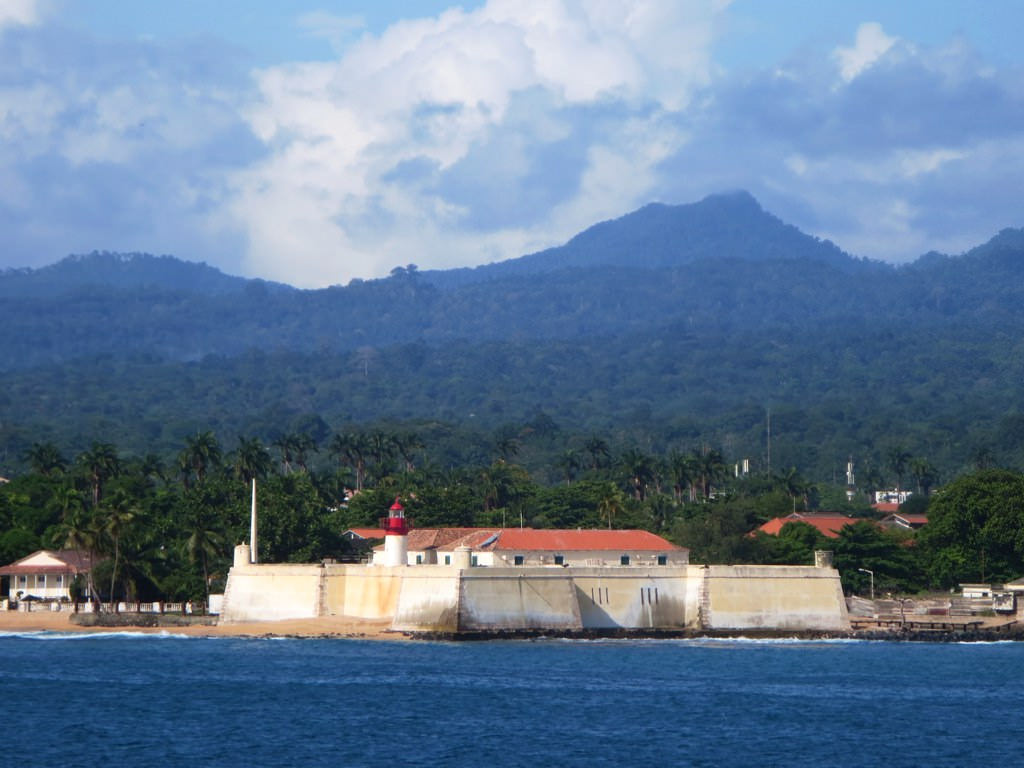
- Pico de Sao Tome, as seen from Ana Chaves Bay in the city of Sao Tome.

Highest point
- Elevation: 2,024 m (6,640 ft)
- Prominence: 2,024 m (6,640 ft)
- Listing: Country high point Island high point Ultra
- Coordinates: 0°16′10″N 6°32′30″E

Geography
- Location within São Tomé
- Location: São Tomé Island, São Tomé and Príncipe

Geology
- Mountain type: Shield volcano

Pico de São Tomé is the highest mountain in São Tomé and Príncipe at 2,024 m (6,640 ft) elevation. It lies just west of the centre of São Tomé Island, in the Parque Natural Obô de São Tomé and in the Lembá District. The second highest point, Pico de Ana Chaves (1,630 m [5,348 ft]), lies about 3 km (1.9 mi) to its south east. The town Santa Catarina is 8 km (5.0 mi) to the west.

== Description ==
The entire island of São Tomé is a massive shield volcano which rises from the floor of the Atlantic Ocean, over 3,000 m (10,000 ft) below sea level. It formed along the Cameroon line, a linear rift zone extending from Cameroon southwest into the Atlantic Ocean. Most of the lava erupted on São Tomé over the last million years has been basalt. The most recent activity was about 36,000 years ago.

On old maps of São Tomé and Príncipe, the mountain is named "Pico Gago Coutinho", after Portuguese naval officer Carlos Viegas Gago Coutinho (1869–1959) who, together with Sacadura Cabral (1881–1924), was the first to cross the South Atlantic Ocean by air.

The mountain is clad in forest. On the lower slopes are plantations of coffee and cocoa, and higher up are large trees swathed in orchids, lichens and other epiphytes. The upper parts of the mountain, from 1,400 m (4,600 ft) to its peak, are Afromontane cloud forest, often swathed in mist. On the highest areas, tree cover lessens and vegetation is shorter, while ferns make up a significant portion of plant diversity. Endemic species in this altitude are: Afrocarpus mannii, Balthasaria mannii, Psychotria guerkeana and P. nubicola.

The mountain can be climbed from two sides. One way starts above the Ponta Figo plantation and necessitates a camp at Pico Mesa at 1,875 m (6,152 ft). The summit can then be reached in about an hour before descending via Carvalho to the Bombaim Plantation house. The other route ascends from the botanic garden at Bom Sucesso to Carvalho where there is a rest area and camping facilities. On the next day, the summit can be reached with a descent being made to Ponta Figo. The ascent can be made in a single eighteen hour hike from Ponta Figo, but this does not allow much time for viewing the flora and fauna. The trek is not difficult but the often rainy weather tends to make the path very slippery.

== See also ==
- List of mountains in São Tomé and Príncipe
- List of Ultras of Africa

== Bibliography ==
- Jones, P.J.; Burlison, J.P.; Tye, A. (1991). Conservação dos Ecossistemas Florestais na República Democrática de São Tomé e Príncipe (PDF) (in Portuguese). Gland, Switzerland and Cambridge, United Kingdom: IUCN. ISBN 2-88032-994-9.
