= Generosa, São Tomé and Príncipe =

Generosa
- Village
- Location on São Tomé Island
- Coordinates: 0.336°N 6.5404°E
- Country: São Tomé and Príncipe
- Island: São Tomé
- District: Lembá

Population (2012)
  - Total: 448
- Time zone: UTC+1 (WAT)

Generosa is a settlement in the Lembá District in the western part of São Tomé Island in São Tomé and Príncipe. Its population is 448 (2012 census). It lies 1 km southwest of Ponta Figo and 3 km southwest of Neves.

== Population history ==
Historical population
| Year | Pop. | ±% |
|---|---|---|
| 2001 | 291 | — |
| 2008 | 332 | +14.1% |
| 2012 | 448 | +34.9% |
