= Monte Forte, São Tomé and Príncipe =

Monte Forte
- Village
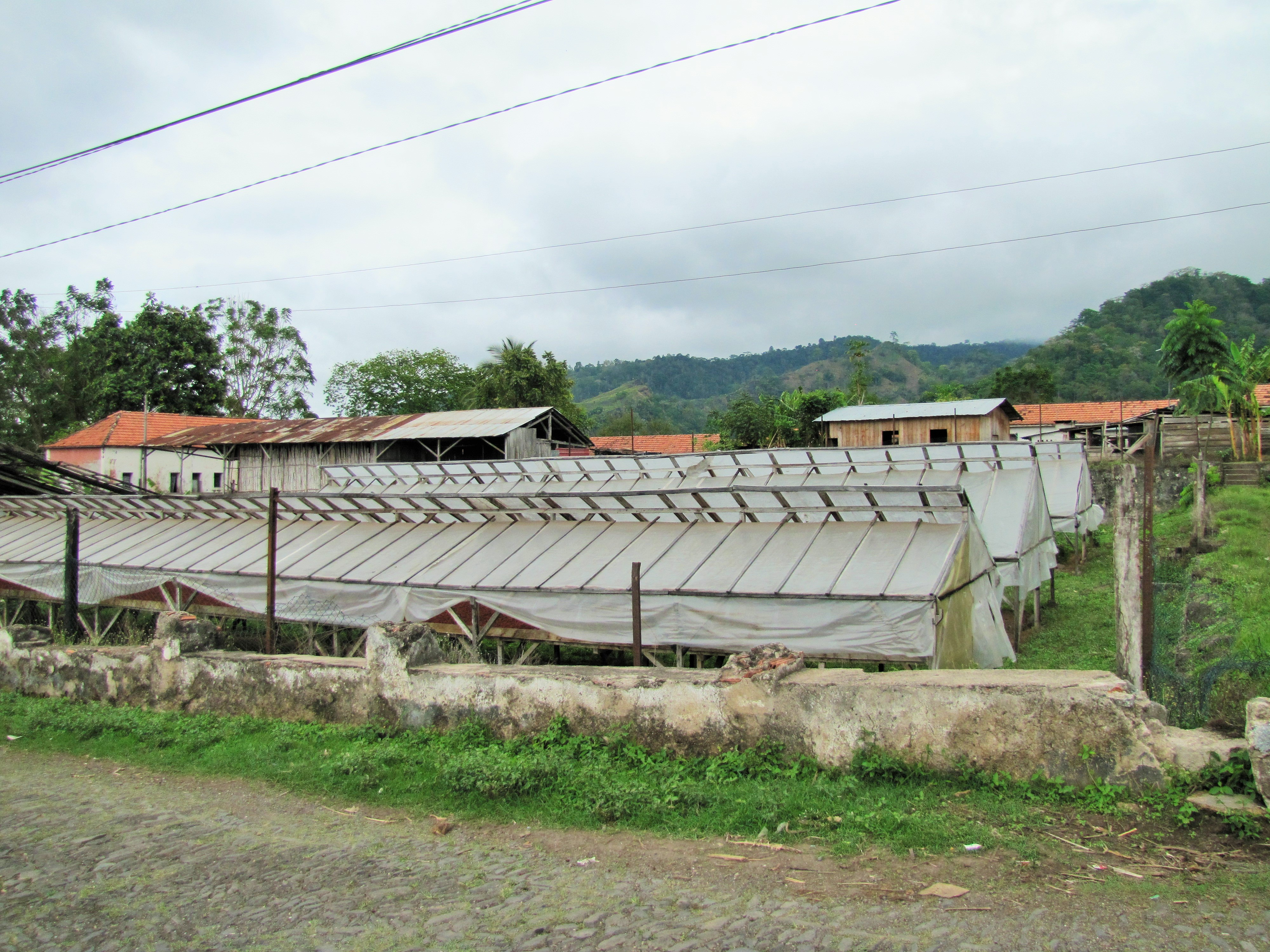
- A drying shelter at Roça de Monte Forte

- Location on São Tomé Island
- Coordinates: 0.3309°N 6.5309°E
- Country: São Tomé and Príncipe
- Island: São Tomé
- District: Lembá

Population (2012)
  - Total: 87
- Time zone: UTC+1 (WAT)

Monte Forte is a settlement in the Lembá District on the northwestern coast of São Tomé Island in São Tomé and Príncipe. Its population is 87 (2012 census). It lies 1.5 km west of Ponta Figo and 3 km southwest of the district capital Neves.

== Population history ==
Historical population
Year	Pop.	±%
2001	70	—
2008	80	+14.3%
2012	87	+8.7%
