= Estádio Nacional 12 de Julho =

Stadium in São Tomé, São Tomé and Príncipe

12th of July National Stadium
- Estádio Nacional 12 de Julho
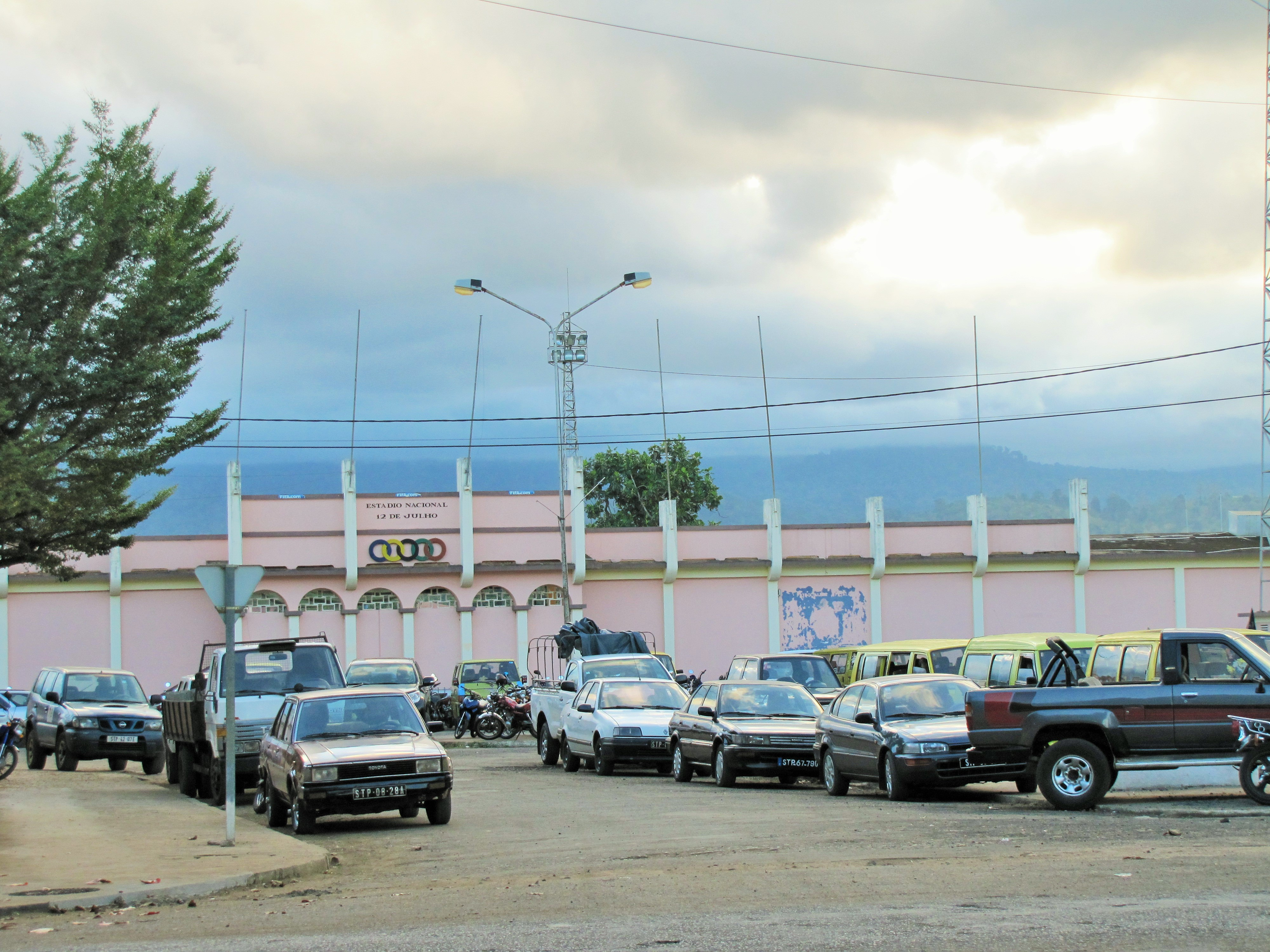
- Exterior of the stadium before 2015 renovations.

- Location within São Tomé
- Former names: Estadio Sarmento Rodrigues (1950-2002)
- Location: Avenida das Nações Unidas; São Tome, São Tomé and Príncipe
- Coordinates: 0°20′6.3″N 6°44′15.0″E
- Owner: São Toméan Football Federation
- Capacity: 6,500
- Surface: Artificial grass
- Scoreboard: yes
- Field size: 105 x 68

Construction
- Opened: 1950
- Renovated: 2002, 2015
- Expanded: 2003
- Architect: Eurico Pinto Lopes
- Structural engineer: Salomão Quinhones Levy

Tenants
- Andorinha Sport Club; Sporting Praia Cruz; São Tomé and Príncipe national football team Sporting São Tomé

Estádio Nacional 12 de Julho is a multi-use stadium in the neighbourhood of Ponta da Mina southeast of the centre of São Tomé, São Tomé and Príncipe and is located on Avenida das Nações Unidas. The building is classified as a Heritage of Portuguese Influence and Origin (SIPA). It is currently used mostly for football matches. The stadium can hold 6,500 people and the field size is 105 × 68 m. The surface is Artificial turf.

== Stadium details ==
The stadium is home to Andorinha, Sporting Praia Cruz and Sporting São Tomé, other clubs that play at the stadium include Vitória Riboque, Agrosport and 6 de Setembro. A former club that once played at the stadium is Porto Folha Fede who once played as Porto de São Tomé.

The stadium is equipped with floodlights and a scoreboard. The stand located where the main entrance is, has a roof over it. Its interiors and exteriors are coloured pink with its entrance section coloured orange and blue. Before its recent renovations in 2015 the entrance section was coloured pink and had white columns and brown rims. Its doors are of neoclassical style with a mixture of Mediterranean architectural styles; the remaining things are modernistic.

The stadium also has a running track, and track events are sometimes held at the stadium.

== History ==
The stadium was built around the 1920s as a football field. The building was opened in 1950. It was the first football stadium in the nation. The stadium was formerly named Estádio Sarmento Rodrigues. It was renovated in 2002 and expanded in 2003.

The Taça Nacional de São Tomé e Príncipe (Santomean Cup) is played here annually.

Some continental football competitions were played at the stadium including the 2013 CAF Confederation Cup with CD Guadalupe and the 2014 CAF Champions League. Since Sporting Praia Cruz withdrew, the 2016 edition was not played here.

== See also ==
- List of buildings and structures in São Tomé and Príncipe
