= Ribeira Funda, São Tomé and Príncipe =

Ribeira Funda
- Village
- Location on São Tomé Island
- Coordinates: 0.369°N 6.577°E
- Country: São Tomé and Príncipe
- Island: São Tomé
- District: Lembá

Population (2012)
  - Total: 282
- Time zone: UTC+1 (WAT)

Ribeira Funda is a settlement in the Lembá District in the northwestern part of São Tomé Island in São Tomé and Príncipe. Its population is 282 (2012 census). It lies 3.5 km (2.2 mi) east of Neves and 7 km (4.3 mi) west of Guadalupe.

== Population history ==
Historical population
Year	Pop.	±%
2001	214	—
2008	244	+14.0%
2012	282	+15.6%
