= 2019 São Tomé and Príncipe Championship =

São Tomé and Príncipe Championship
- Season: 2019

The 2019 São Tomé and Principe Championship is the 34th season of the São Tomé and Príncipe Championship, the top-level football championship of São Tomé and Príncipe.

There are two separate championships, the São Tomé Island League for teams of São Tomé Island and the Príncipe Island League for teams of Príncipe Island. The champions of the two island championships play a home-and-away two-legged final to decide the overall champions.

== Regional leagues ==
=== São Tomé ===
Last updated 8 December 2019.

 1.Agrosport             22  13  6  3  38-27  45  Qualified
 - - - - - - - - - - - - - - - - - - - - - - - -
 2.Sporting Praia Cruz   22  13  4  5  49-23  43
 3.UDRA                  22  12  6  4  54-26  42
 4.Trindade FC           22   9  7  6  33-31  34
 5.Vitória Riboque       22   7  8  7  28-28  29
 6.6 de Setembro         22   7  7  8  33-29  28
 7.Aliança Nacional      22   6  8  8  29-31  26  [2 1 1 0 4-2 4]
 8.Palmar Lusitano       22   6  8  8  31-33  26  [2 0 1 1 2-4 1]
 9.Caixão Grande         22   5  9  8  21-31  24
10.Sporting São Tomé     22   6  4 12  22-51  22
------------------------------------------------
11.Folha Fede            21   3  8 10  24-37  17  Relegated
12.Santana FC            21   3  7 11  27-42  16  Relegated

=== Príncipe ===
Last updated 30 November 2019.

1.Operários             19  15  1  3  55-23  46       Qualified
- - - - - - - - - - - - - - - - - - - - - - - -
2.Porto Real            19  13  2  4  69-19  41
3.Sundy                 18  10  2  6  50-27  32
4.Sporting              19   8  2  9  31-36  26
5.UDAPB                 17   3  2 12  14-55  11
6.1º de Maio            18   0  3 15  17-76   3

== National championship ==
Team	Qualifying method
Agrosport	Champions of São Tomé Island League
GD Os Operários	Champions of Príncipe Island League

15 December 2019

Agrosport	4–1	GD Os Operários

21 December 2019

GD Os Operários	0–0	Agrosport
