= Dungue Lima =

São Toméan footballer

Personal information
- Full name: Dungue Lima
- Date of birth: 24 February 1983 (age 43)
- Place of birth: São Tomé and Príncipe
- Position: Goalkeeper

Team information
- Current team: Folha Fede

Senior career*
Years	Team	Apps	(Gls)
2011–2016	UDESCAI		
2016–	Folha Fede		

International career
2011–	São Tomé and Príncipe	1	(0)
- * Club domestic league appearances and goals

Dungue Lima (born 24 February 1983) is a São Toméan footballer who has played for the São Tomé and Príncipe national team.
