= Lembá (village) =

- Village
- Location on São Tomé Island
- Coordinates: 0.251°N 6.4671°E
- Country: São Tomé and Príncipe
- Island: São Tomé
- District: Lembá

Population (2012)
  - Total: 395
- Time zone: UTC+1 (WAT)

Lembá is a seaside settlement in the Lembá District in the western part of São Tomé Island in São Tomé and Príncipe. Its population is 395 (2012 census). It lies 2.5 km south of Santa Catarina.

== Population history ==
Historical population
Year	Pop.	±%
2001	251	—
2008	286	+13.9%
2012	395	+38.1%
