= Água Porca =

- Location on São Tomé Island
- Coordinates: 0.3309°N 6.7106°E
- Country: São Tomé and Príncipe
- Island: São Tomé
- District: Água Grande

Population (2012)
  - Total: 2,048
- Time zone: UTC+1 (WAT)

Água Porca is a suburb of the city São Tomé in the nation of São Tomé and Príncipe. Its population is 2,048 (2012 census).

== Population history ==
Historical population
Year	Pop.	±%
2001	2,777	—
2008	3,165	+14.0%
2012	2,048	−35.3%
