= Rosema, São Tomé and Príncipe =

Rosema
- Village
- Location on São Tomé Island
- Coordinates: 0.3511°N 6.5704°E
- Country: São Tomé and Príncipe
- Island: São Tomé
- District: Lembá

Population (2012)
  - Total: 2,587
- Time zone: UTC+1 (WAT)

Rosema is a settlement on the northwestern coast of São Tomé Island in São Tomé and Príncipe. It is an eastern subdivision of the town Neves, in the Lembá District. Its population is 2,587 (2012 census).

== Population history ==
Historical population
Year	Pop.	±%
2001	1,623	—
2008	1,850	+14.0%
2012	2,587	+39.8%
