= São João da Vargem =

- Location on São Tomé Island
- Coordinates: 0°20′34″N 6°43′18″E
- Country: São Tomé and Príncipe
- Island: São Tomé
- District: Água Grande

Population (2012)
  - Total: 1,793
- Time zone: UTC+1 (WAT)

São João da Vargem is a suburb of the city São Tomé in the nation of São Tomé and Príncipe. Its population is 1,793 (2012 census). It lies on the coast, 1 km northwest of the city centre of São Tomé.

== Population history ==
Historical population
| Year | Pop. | ±% |
|---|---|---|
| 2001 | 1,723 | — |
| 2008 | 1,964 | +14.0% |
| 2012 | 1,793 | −8.7% |
