= National University of Equatorial Guinea =

Public university in Equatorial Guinea

- Universidad Nacional de Guinea Ecuatorial
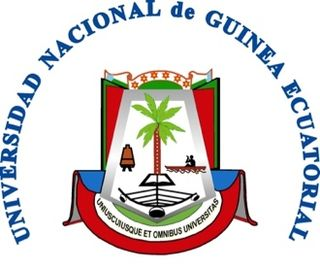
- Motto: Uniuscuiusque et omnibus universitas
- Motto in English: University for all, even the lesser people
- Type: National
- Established: 6 January 1995; 31 years ago
- Rector: Filiberto Ntutumu Nguema Nchama
- Location: Hassan II Avenue, Malabo, Bioko Norte, Equatorial Guinea; 3.7468°N 8.7752°E
- Website: ungecampus.com

The National University of Equatorial Guinea (UNGE; Spanish: Universidad Nacional de Guinea Ecuatorial) is a public institution of higher education, being one of the main universities of Equatorial Guinea in Central Africa.

It has a main campus in Malabo as well as a unit in Bata. Its current rector is Filiberto Ntutumu Nguema Nchama.

== History ==
The university tradition of UNGE dates back to the Spanish colonial period, when the country's first high schools were founded, anchored in the Spanish concern before the various decolonization movements that were beginning to take shape on the African continent.

=== From the colonial period to independence ===
The course of the UNGE began with the former Indigenous Colonial Institute (Instituto Colonial Indígena), created on 30 March 1935, with vocation for technical education. However, it was only on 6 August 1943, when this Institute was elevated to Indigenous Higher School (ESI; Escuela Superior Indígena), that in fact began higher education in Guinea. From 1958 onwards, the ESI was renamed the Santo Tomás de Aquino Higher School (Escuela Superior Santo Tomás de Aquino), again changing its name in 1959 to the Provincial Higher School (Escuela Superior Provincial). In this period the establishment existed diplomas of administration, teaching (today pedagogy) and commerce (now economic sciences).

While the country became independent, under the command of the dictator Macías Nguema, the school was reformulated, being denominated in 1971 of Martin Luther King Higher School (ESMLK; Escuela Superior "Martin Luther King"). The school, however, had not yet been able to fulfill a broad training role, a fact that would only occur in the 1980s, with the unification of the ESMLK with the School of Teaching of Malabo, allowing mainly to expand the training of graduates to teach at primary levels and secondary.

=== Post-coup reforms by Obiang ===
When Teodoro Obiang took over the government in a coup in 1979, he sought to expand access to higher education through strong cooperation with UNESCO and the Spanish government. This culminated in the transformation of ESMLK, in 1984, in University School of Training of the Teachers of Malabo (Escuela Universitaria de Formación del Profesorado de Malabo). In addition, the National School of Agriculture (later the University School of Agricultural, Fisheries and Forestry) was created in 1987, with financing from the African Development Bank. The educational reforms proposed by UNESCO to Obiang also gave origin to the University School of Training of the Professors of Bata and to University School of Health and Environment.

=== Formation of UNGE ===
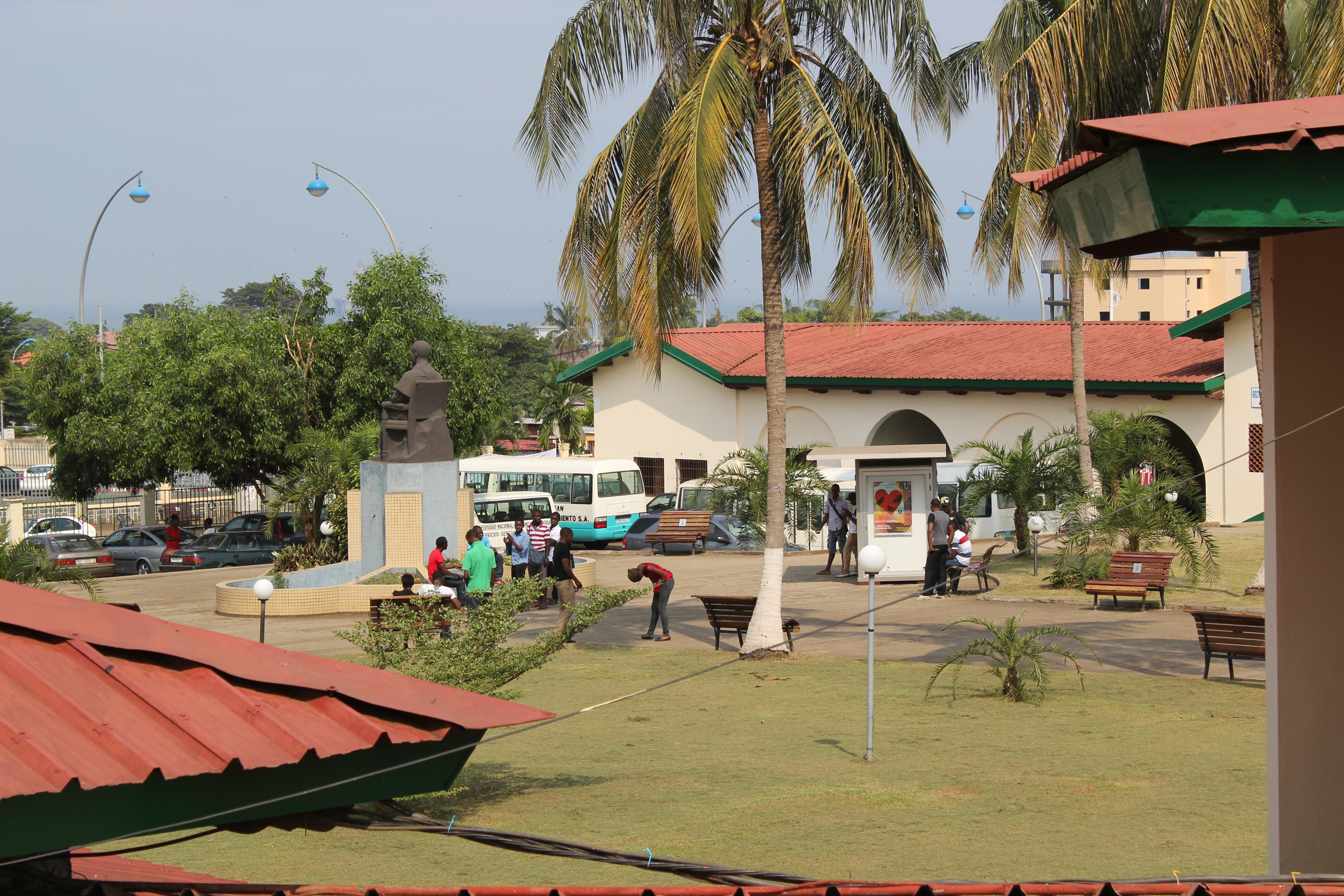
The UNGE Central Campus, in Malabo, 2011

These four schools gave the possibility of maturing higher education to the country, while forming important technical staff. Faced with this the government saw the need to implement a university that would come to federate the institutions.

The National University of Equatorial Guinea (UNGE; Universidad Nacional de Guinea Ecuatorial) was created through Law No. 12/1995 of 6 January 1995, bringing together:

- University School of Teacher Training of Malabo;
- University School of Agricultural, Fisheries and Forest Studies;
- University School of Teacher Training of Bata;
- University School of Health and Environment.

In 1998, the University School of Administration was incorporated into the structure of UNGE and the Faculty of Arts and Social Sciences was created. In 2001, the Faculty of Medical Sciences and the University School of Engineering and Technique was created.

== Organisational structure ==
In 2015, the university was organized according to the following organizational structure:

- Faculty of Environment;
- Faculty of Arts and Social Sciences;
- Faculty of Education Sciences of Malabo;
- Faculty of Educational Sciences of Bata;
- Faculty of Architecture and Engineering of Bata;
- Medical Sciences College;
- Faculty of Humanities and Religious Sciences.

The UNGE is still composed of 3 affiliated university schools:

- University School of Agricultural, Fisheries and Forest Studies "Obiang Nguema Mbasogo" (Faculty of Engineering of Malabo);
- University School of Administration;
- University School of Health and Environment.

== Infrastructure ==
The Main Campus in Malabo is located on Hassan II Avenue. The headquarters building of the rectory was built in 1949 and is part of the nation's architectural patrimony. The Malabo campus residence has a capacity of 200 seats.

The university has a rectory headquarters in Bata.

The university is still one of the responsible for the Luba Crater Scientific Reserve, developing many research projects there, mainly on the local primate population.

== Rectors ==
Name	Mandate	Affiliation	Form of election
Maria Teresa Avoro Nguema Ebana	6 January 1995 - 1996	University School of Training of the Teachers of Malabo	Presidential nomination
Federico Edjo Ovono	1996 - 20 August 2003	University School of Agricultural, Fisheries and Forest Studies	Presidential nomination
Carlos Nse Nsuga	20 August 2003 - 9 April 2015	Faculty of Education Sciences of Malabo	Presidential nomination
Filiberto Ntutumu Nguema Nchama	9 April 2015 - actuality	University School of Agricultural, Fisheries and Forest Studies	Presidential nomination

== See also ==
- Colegio Nacional Enrique Nvó Okenve
