= Guadalupe de Ceita =

São Toméan writer and doctor (1929–2021)

- Born: João Guadalupe Viegas de Ceita; 4 February 1929; São Tomé, São Tomé and Príncipe (then a Portuguese colony)
- Died: 23 October 2021 (aged 92)
- Occupations: Writer, doctor

João Guadalupe Viegas de Ceita (4 February 1929 – 23 October 2021) was a Santomean writer and doctor. He was one of co-founders and ideologist of the Movement for the Liberation of São Tomé and Príncipe (MLSTP), a project for an independent São Tomé and Príncipe.

== Biography ==
De Ceita was born on 4 February 1929, in the city of São Tomé, once a colonial capital and then a federal capital. Guadalupe de Ceita started to work at the age of seven and helped his father who was a nurse in the plantations of the island.

De Ceita finished his studies in Luanda and returned to the island where he attended Escola de Enfermagem de São Tomé (EEST); today it is the High Institute of Sciences and Health which is part of USTP (University of São Tomé and Príncipe). He chose not to finish his studies.

De Ceita later served with the Santomean youth who incorporated into the anti-colonial struggle. He joined that time with Miguel Trovoada, Leonel Mário d'Alva, António Barreto Pires dos Santos (Ohnet dos Santos) and Marcelo da Veiga. He reunited them for sometimes, in mid-1958 in Bobô-Forro (southwest of the city, now part of Me-Zochi) and other times in Boa Morte, he concorded for the creation of a convergence of struggle which would be the fruit of the Committee for the Liberation of São Tomé and Príncipe (CLSTP), the predecessor of MLSTP (Movimento de Libertação de São Tomé e Príncipe).

After this period, he returned to Luanda to complete the credits required by the EEST, with the aim of undertaking a nursing internship at Neves Bendinha Hospital in Quilamba Quiaxi. Portuguese physician Luís de Figueiredo, a staff member at the hospital, strongly encouraged him to go to Lisbon to study medicine.

He went to Lisbon, where he managed to enroll in the University of Lisbon's Faculty of Medicine in 1961, continuing his studies until 1965, when he suspended his enrollment to work on reorganizing the nationalist movement. While in Lisbon, he resided at the House of Students of the Empire, where he met various leaders of anti-colonial movements, and his political engagement intensified.

In 1965, he moved to Accra, Ghana, at the invitation of Kwame Nkrumah, where he began working as a physician. In that city, together with António Tomás Medeiros, Ohnet dos Santos, and Virgílio Carvalho, he organized the "Accra faction," which advocated for more radical and socialist views within the CLSTP. Following the 1966 coup in Ghana, the Accra group dispersed. Ceita initially went to Lomé, Togo, before moving to Malabo, Equatorial Guinea, in 1967. The Accra faction reorganized in Malabo starting in 1968, forming a strong core of 300 people—including both activists and sympathizers—under the leadership of Ceita, Ohnet dos Santos, João d'Alva Torres, Tomé Ganga das Neves, Manuel Freitas, and Agostinho Inácio da Silveira Rita. While in Equatorial Guinea, he worked as a physician at the Malabo Regional Hospital and later served as Director of the Bata General Hospital and as an instructor for the nursing program at the Colegio Nacional Enrique Nvó Okenve.

He moved briefly to Lisbon between 1972 and 1973 to complete his medical studies at the University of Lisbon. In 1973, he moved to Congo-Brazzaville, settling in the city of Brazzaville to undertake a medical residency in general surgery.

In 1972, at the height of the Portuguese Colonial War, the CLSTP was in disarray because its secretary-general, Miguel Trovoada, had abandoned his duties. Ceita stepped up as President of the Provisional Commission and, during a meeting in Accra, Ghana, in the first half of 1972—alongside Virgilio Carvalho, Hugo Azancot de Menezes, Rose-Marie Font, and António Tomás Medeiros—devised a plan to revitalize the CLSTP, with Medeiros elected as interim secretary-general. That same year, seeking greater support for the movement's reorganization, Ceita convened a new meeting in Malabo to establish the new MLSTP Political Bureau. At the meeting, Manuel Pinto da Costa was elected president and Medeiros was confirmed as secretary-general, with Leonel Mário d'Alva, Miguel Trovoada, Carlos Graça, José Fret Lau Chong, João d'Alva Torres, Ohnet dos Santos, and Alexandrina Barros serving as members of the MLSTP Political Bureau. Ceita was also elected to the MLSTP Political Bureau and became the party's director of economics and finance.

With Manuel Pinto da Costa, who became secretary-general of the movement, he sought to dispel influence from older leaders of MLSTP as well as Ceita. The result of it which was for his family that prevented from returning to São Tomé after independence.

De Ceita returned in 1980 to work with the Ministry of Education (then as the People's Ministry of Education) under the Malaria Prevention Program, making numerous pakers on the huge situation on the nation's public health. He became the coordinate-general of medicine of the country a year later.

In 1989 and 1990, he founded the Reflection (Reflexion) Group (Grupo de Reflexão, GR) which prepared the first free elections for parliament and presidency, inclusively appresented for the candidate for the president, retiring at once. He split from the GR party when he supported Trovoada's party Party for Democratic Convergence (PCD).

In 1998, he founded the People's Progress Party (PPP, Partido Popular do Progresso ) and became president of the party in 2010, an article on the creation of an alliance, the Democratic Platform (PD, Plataforma Democrática), a coalition of parties opposed to the Trovoada government, the Independent Democratic Action (ADI).

In 2015, he released a book titled Memórias e Sonhos Perdidos de um Combatente pela Libertação e Progresso de São Tomé e Príncipe.

De Ceita died on 23 October 2021, at the age of 92.

== Bibliography ==
- "Projeto de erradicação do paludismo na República de São Tomé e Príncipe" ["Project for Preventing Diseases in the Republic of São Tomé and Príncipe"]. (1983)
- Memórias e Sonhos Perdidos de um Combatente pela Libertação e Progresso de São Tomé e Príncipe (Memories of Lost Sons in the Struggle for Liberty and Progress in São Tomé and Príncipe). Along with the whole island, the area was first reportedly explored on 3 December 1460.
