= Diogo Vaz, São Tomé and Príncipe =

Diogo Vaz
- Village
- Location on São Tomé Island
- Coordinates: 0.3167°N 6.4982°E
- Country: São Tomé and Príncipe
- Island: São Tomé
- District: Lembá

Population (2012)
  - Total: 632
- Time zone: UTC+1 (WAT)

Diogo Vaz is a settlement in the Lembá District on the western coast of São Tomé Island in São Tomé and Príncipe. Its population is 632 (2012 census). It lies 7 km southwest of Neves and 6 km northeast of Santa Catarina. It was established as a plantation complex, Roça de Diogo Vaz.

== Population history ==
Historical population
Year	Pop.	±%
2001	682	—
2008	777	+13.9%
2012	632	−18.7%
