= 2023 São Tomé and Príncipe Championship =

São Tomé and Príncipe Championship
- Season: 2023
- Champions: Militar 6 Setembro
- Top goalscorer: Jamilson Santos (22 goals)

The 2023 São Tomé and Príncipe Championship was the final stage of the top-flight football league in São Tomé and Príncipe, featuring qualifiers from the São Toméan league and the Príncipean league.

Seis de Setembro won their first championship in 35 years after defeating Operário 6–5 on penalties in the championship round. The first leg in Tomé finished 1–1 as well.

Seis de Setembro won the São Tomé championship on the last match day, winning their final match when they only needed a draw to ensure Agrosport de Monte Café finished second.

São Tomé and Príncipe did not send any teams to either of the 2023–24 African club cup competitions.

== League Tables ==
=== São Tomé ===
Pos	Team	Pld	W	D	L	GF	GA	GD	Pts	Qualification or relegation
1	Militar 6 Setembro	22	17	3	2	43	14	+29	54	Champions and qualification to the Championship round
2	Agrosport de Monte Café	22	16	4	2	41	16	+25	52	
3	Inter Bom-Bom	22	12	2	8	44	30	+14	38	
4	Aliança Nacional	22	11	4	7	34	26	+8	37	
5	Trindade	22	10	7	5	35	22	+13	37	
6	UDRA	22	9	4	9	36	33	+3	31	
7	Caixão Grande	22	8	4	10	31	32	−1	28	
8	Vitória	22	5	11	6	22	24	−2	26	
9	Palmar Lusitano	22	6	5	11	31	34	−3	23	
10	Sporting Praia Cruz	22	6	4	12	26	37	−11	22	
11	Neves (R)	22	6	2	14	22	39	−17	20	Relegation
12	Sporting São Tomé (R)	22	0	2	20	12	70	−58	2	Relegation

Rules for classification: 1) points; 2) goal difference; 3) number of goals scored.
(R) Relegated

=== Príncipe League ===
Pos	Team	Pld	W	D	L	GF	GA	GD	Pts	Qualification or relegation
1	GD Os Operários	20	16	1	3	56	13	+43	49	Champions and qualification to the Championship round
2	Porto Real	20	14	3	3	70	21	+49	45	
3	Sporting Príncipe	20	8	4	8	34	38	−4	28	
4	GD Sundy	20	7	4	9	24	37	−13	25	
5	UDAPB	20	4	3	13	27	56	−29	15	
6	Primerio de Maio	20	3	1	16	20	66	−46	10	

Rules for classification: 1) points; 2) goal difference; 3) number of goals scored.

== Championship round ==
27 October 2023
Final, first leg

Militar 6 Setembro	1–1	Operário
Gilberto		Guiomy

Estádio Nacional de Julho
3 November 2023
Final, second leg

Operário	1–1	Militar 6 Setembro
Penalties
	5–6

Regional stadium 13 de Junho
