= São Marçal =

- Location on São Tomé Island
- Coordinates: 0.319°N 6.7364°E
- Country: São Tomé and Príncipe
- Island: São Tomé
- District: Água Grande

Population (2012)
  - Total: 2,866
- Time zone: UTC+1 (WAT)

São Marçal (Portuguese for Saint Martial) is a suburb of the city São Tomé in the nation of São Tomé and Príncipe. Its population is 2,866 (2012 census). It is 2.3 km southeast of the city centre of São Tomé and 1 km northwest of Pantufo.

== Population history ==
Historical population
| Year | Pop. | ±% |
|---|---|---|
| 2001 | 2,409 | — |
| 2008 | 2,746 | +14.0% |
| 2012 | 2,866 | +4.4% |
