= Quinta Santo António =

- Location on São Tomé Island
- Coordinates: 0.3265°N 6.7334°E
- Country: São Tomé and Príncipe
- Island: São Tomé
- District: Água Grande

Population (2012)
  - Total: 4,299
- Time zone: UTC+1 (WAT)

Quinta Santo António is a suburb of the city São Tomé in the nation of São Tomé and Príncipe. Its population is 4,299 (2012 census).

== Population history ==
Historical population
Year	Pop.	±%
2001	2,970	—
2008	3,385	+14.0%
2012	4,299	+27.0%
