= Chacara, São Tomé and Príncipe =

Chacara
- Location on São Tomé Island
- Coordinates: 0.3325°N 6.7252°E
- Country: São Tomé and Príncipe
- Island: São Tomé
- District: Água Grande

Population (2012)
  - Total: 1,500
- Time zone: UTC+1 (WAT)

Chacara is a suburb of the city São Tomé in the nation of São Tomé and Príncipe. Its population is 1,500 (2012 census).

== Population history ==
Historical population
Year	Pop.	±%
2001	1,636	—
2008	1,865	+14.0%
2012	1,500	−19.6%
