= Ilhéu de São Miguel =

Island in São Tomé and Príncipe

- Location off São Tomé Island

Geography
- Location: Southwest of the island of São Tomé, São Tomé and Príncipe
- Coordinates: 0.138°N 6.4815°E

Administration
- São Tomé and Príncipe

Demographics
- Population: 0

Ilhéu de São Miguel is an islet in the Gulf of Guinea and is one of the smaller islands of São Tomé and Príncipe. The islet lies 0.3 km off the southwest coast of the island of São Tomé, near the small village São Miguel, Lembá District. Due south is another islet, Ilhéu Gabado.
