= Colegio Nacional Enrique Nvó Okenve =

Public college in Equatorial Guinea

- Type: Public College
- Established: 1959; 67 years ago
- Location: Bata (seat) and Malabo, Equatorial Guinea

Colegio Nacional Enrique Nvó Okenve (or Enrique Nvó Okenve National College) is a college in Equatorial Guinea. The college has two campuses, based in the cities of Bata (seat) and Malabo.

It was originally created in 1959, under Spanish colonial administration, under the name of Centro Laboral La Salle de Bata.

After independence in 1968, the college was renamed to honor Enrique Nvó Okenve, a martyr for independence and founder of the Idea Popular de Guinea Ecuatorial. Okenve's nationalist ideas and his rise to power in sections of northern Río Muni concerned Spanish-appointed Governor-General Faustino Ruiz González, who has been alleged to be responsible for contract killers who assassinated Okenve in 1959.

Renovation of the Malabo site and reconditioning of the Bata site has been funded by USAID.

== Notable people ==
- Teodoro Obiang (student at "La Salle de Bata") – military and politician;
- Guadalupe de Ceita (professor) – physician and politician.

== See also ==
- National University of Equatorial Guinea
