= Praia de Ponta Figo =

- Subdivision
- Location on São Tomé Island
- Coordinates: 0.3587°N 6.5437°E
- Country: São Tomé and Príncipe
- Island: São Tomé
- District: Lembá

Population (2012)
  - Total: 247
- Time zone: UTC+1 (WAT)

Praia de Ponta Figo is a subdivision in the western part of the town of Neves in the Lembá District in the northwestern part of São Tomé Island in São Tomé and Príncipe. Its population is 247 (2012 census).

== Population history ==
Historical population
Year	Pop.	±%
2001	169	—
2008	193	+14.2%
2012	247	+28.0%
