= FC Neves =

- Full name: Futebol Clube Neves
- Ground: Neves on São Tomé Island, São Tomé and Príncipe
- League: São Tomé Island League
- 2017: 4th

Futebol Clube Neves is an association football club that plays in the São Tomé and Príncipe Championship. The team is based in the island of São Tomé and currently plays in the island Premier Division.

== History ==
In the 2000s, Neves mainly played in the second division until they were promoted in the 2009–10 season. Neves participated until they were relegated in 2011 after being tenth with 17 points. They spent two years in the Second Division until they were elevated once again in 2014; the club finished sixth in the 2014 Premier Division and continued to the end of the 2015 season where they were relegated. Neves spent only a season in that for division in 2016. The club was the regional Second Division champions for the season, together with UDESCAI, they are competing in the Premier Division for the season. In the 2017 season, in the middle of the season, FC Neves reached up to the number two spot and was trying to gain a chance to win a regional title. At the 17th round, their chance was slimmed on 5 August as they were third on 3 September, Neves finished fourth behind Caixão Grande for the season.

== Logo and uniform ==
Its logo has a crested shield and is coloured red and white along with its clothing uniforms.

== Achievements ==
=== Secondary achievements ===
- São Tomé Island Second Division: 1

2016

== League and cup history ==
=== Island championships ===
| Season | Div. | Pos. | Pl. | W | D | L | GS | GA | GD | P | Cup | Qualification/relegation |
|---|---|---|---|---|---|---|---|---|---|---|---|---|
| 2011 | 2 | 10 | 21 | 3 | 8 | 10 | 24 | 37 | -13 | 17 | | Relegated into the island Second Division |
| 2012 | 3 | | 18 | - | - | - | - | - | - | - | | |
| 2013 | 3 | | 18 | - | - | - | - | - | - | - | | Promoted into the island Premier Division |
| 2014 | 2 | 6 | 18 | - | - | - | - | - | - | - | | None |
| 2015 | 2 | 9 | 18 | 6 | 2 | 10 | 21 | 30 | -9 | 20 | | Relegated into the Regional Second Division |
| 2016 | 3 | 1 | 18 | - | - | - | - | - | - | - | | Promoted into the Regional Premier Division |
| 2017 | 2 | 4 | 22 | 10 | 4 | 8 | 35 | 34 | +1 | 34 | | None |
