= Ilhéu Gabado =

Island in São Tomé and Príncipe

- Location off São Tomé Island

Geography
- Location: Southwest of the island of São Tomé, São Tomé and Príncipe
- Coordinates: 0.1316°N 6.480796°E

Administration
- São Tomé and Príncipe

Demographics
- Population: 0

Ilhéu Gabado is an uninhabited islet in the Gulf of Guinea in the tropical Atlantic Ocean and is one of the smaller islands of São Tomé and Príncipe. The islet lies 0.4 km off the southwest coast of the island of São Tomé. Due north is another islet, Ilhéu de São Miguel.
