= Riboque =

- Location on São Tomé Island
- Coordinates: 0°20′N 6°43′E
- Country: São Tomé and Príncipe
- Island: São Tomé
- District: Água Grande

Population (2012)
  - Total: 4,640
- Time zone: UTC+1 (WAT)

Riboque is a suburb of the city São Tomé in the nation of São Tomé and Príncipe. Its population is 4,640 (2012 census).

== Population history ==
Historical population
Year	Pop.	±%
2001	3,713	—
2008	4,232	+14.0%
2012	4,640	+9.6%

== Sporting club ==
- Vitória FC - football (soccer)
