= FC Ribeira Peixe =

- Full name: Futebol Clube Ribeira Peixe
- Ground: Ribeira Peixe and São João dos Angolares, Sāo Tomé Island, São Tomé and Príncipe
- League: São Tomé and Príncipe Championship
- 2016: 2nd, Third Division

Futebol Clube Ribeira Peixe is a football club that plays in the São Tomé Island League, it was recently promoted after being 2nd in the Third Division and plays in the Second Division for the 2017 season. The team is based in the village of Ribeira Peixe, Caué District in the south of the island of São Tomé, São Tomé and Príncipe.

In the 2009–10 two-year season, the club played in the regional First Division. In 2011, they were relegated and in 2012, the club played in the Second Division and at the end of the 2013 season, were relegated and started playing at the lowest Third Division. In 2014, they came back to the Second in 2015 after being in the top two, they were relegated and played for a season in the Third until 2016. The club currently plays in the Second Division for the 2017 season.

== League and cup history ==
=== Island championships ===
Season	Div.	Pos.	Pl.	W	D	L	GS	GA	GD	P	Cup	Qualification/relegation
2009 & 2010	3		-	-	-	-	-	-	-	-		Promoted into the Island First Division
2011	2	11	21	3	5	13	17	48	-31	14		Relegated into the Island Second Division
2012	3		18	-	-	-	-	-	-	-		None
2013	3		18	-	-	-	-	-	-	-		Relegated into the Regional Third Division
2014	4	6	18	-	-	-	-	-	-	-		None
2015	3		18	-	-	-	-	-	-	-		Relegated into the Regional Third Division
2016	4	2	18	-	-	-	-	-	-	-		Promoted into the Regional Second Division

== See also ==
- List of football clubs in São Tomé and Príncipe
