= Vitória FC (Riboque) =

Vitória Futebol Clube do Riboque
- Full name: Vitória Futebol Clube do Riboque
- Nicknames: Os Riboqinos or Os Riboquinhos (Those from the Riboque), Tempestade do Atlântico or Atlântico Tormenta (Atlantic Storm)
- Short name: Vitória Riboque
- Founded: December 18, 1976; 48 years ago
- Ground: Estádio Nacional 12 de Julho, São Tomé, São Tomé
- Capacity: 6,500
- Chairman: Delfim Santiago das Neves
- Manager: José Correia
- League: São Tomé and Príncipe Championship
- 2025: winners in Liga San Tomese
Home colours	Away colours	Third colours

Vitória Futebol Clube do Riboque (Portuguese pronunciation: [viˈtɔɾi.ɐ futɨˈbɔl ˈklub(ɨ) du ʁiˈbɔk(ɨ)]) is a football club that plays in the São Tomé and Príncipe Championship.The club is most noted for the fact that they are the São Tomé and Príncipe one of oldest club, founded 1976. The team is based in Riboque a neighbourhood of city São Tomé in the Água Grande District on the island of São Tomé. Its offices are located at Avenida Geovany in Riboque. The club is the only unrelegated club in the island of São Tomé. Vitória Riboque is historically the third successful football (soccer) club in both São Tomé Island and São Tomé and Príncipe, having won about 25 official titles, 14 are national and the remaining 11 are regional titles. In national championship titles, they have five, about 15% of the championship title totals, by district, half of the titles won. Of the regional titles, about 30% of the totals, by district, more than half of the totals. In cup titles it totals about 30% of the national titles.

== History ==
The team has won five national championship titles and seven local titles. Their first was also the first in the nation to win a title after independence in 1977 and the first team ever to win the first three titles in a row, until 1980, it was the only club who won national titles and from Água Grande. Their last title was won in 2011. Vitória once possessed the most titles regionally and nationally until 2013 when Sporting Praia Cruz shared it, in 2015 the club became second to possess the most titles behind Sporting Praia Cruz. The team also won the first five titles in the same year and won six cup titles, their first was in 1984 and their last was in 2011 and the club has the most national cup titles won.

The club celebrated its 10th anniversary in 1986 and its 25th anniversary in 2001.

== Jersey ==
Its jersey features a striped green shirt with green sleeves and white socks.

== About the club ==
The name is identical to its fathering club, the Portuguese Vitória de Setúbal. It is the only club in the nation that is affiliated to Vitória Setúbal, other affiliates in Africa, one example is Vitória de Santiago (or FC de Praia) based in Cape Verde and Vitória FC de Luanda in Angola.

== Stadium ==
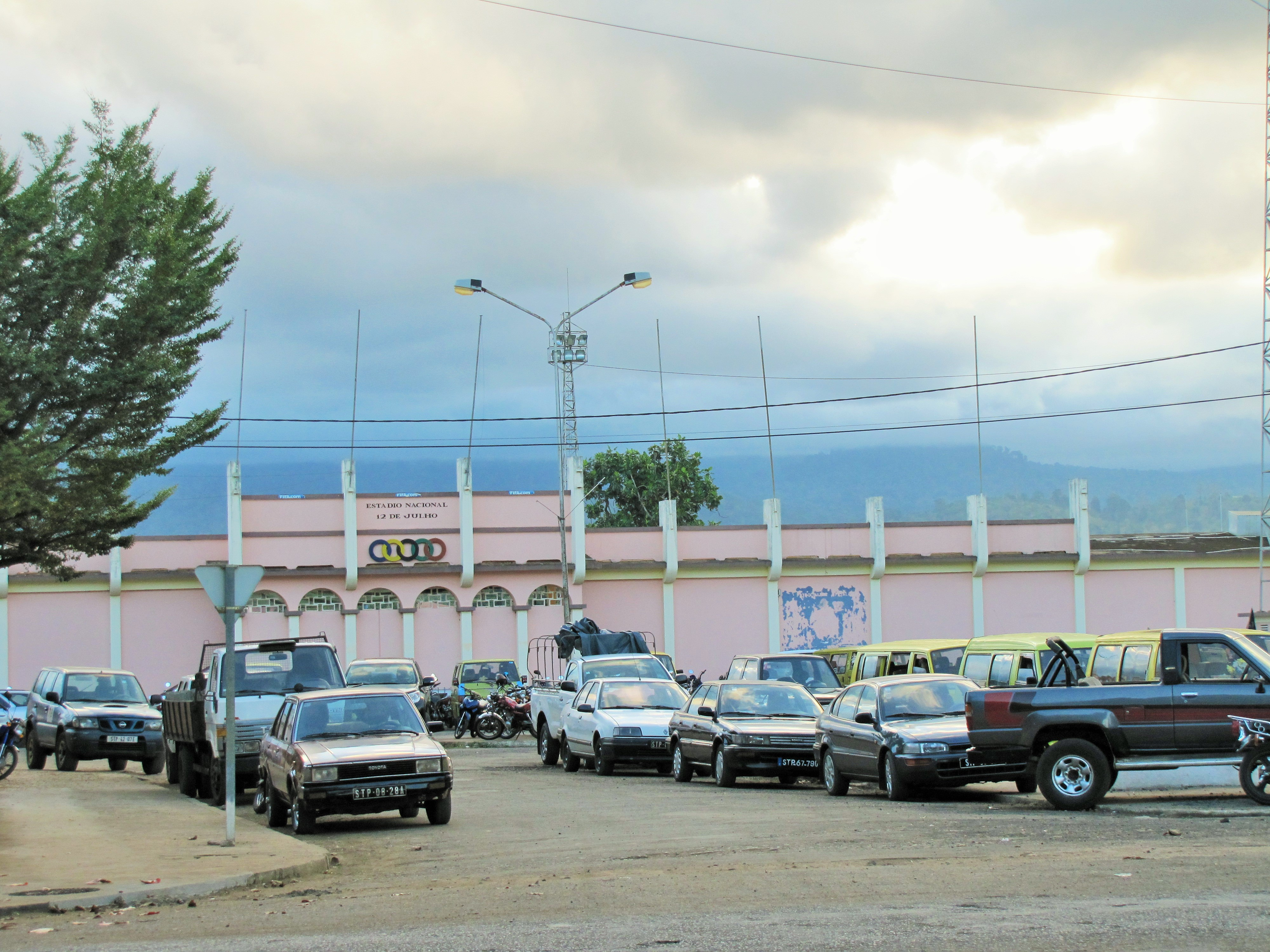
Esádio Nacional 12 de Julho, home field of Vitória Riboque

Estádio Nacional 12 de Julho is a multi-use stadium in São Tomé, São Tomé and Príncipe. It is currently used mostly for football matches. The stadium holds 6,500. Its address is Avenidas das Nações Unidas. The stadium is home to the three best football clubs in the nation and the island including Sporting Praia Cruz, Aliança Nacional. Andorinha and Vitória Riboque

The club also trains and practices at the stadium.

== Honours ==
Domestic

- São Tomé and Príncipe Championships: 5
  - 1977, 1978, 1979, 1986, 1989
- Taça Nacional de São Tomé e Principe: 8
  - 1984, 1985, 1986, 1989, 1990, 1999, 2007, 2011
- São Tomé and Príncipe Super Cup: 1
  - 2011

Regional

- São Tomé Island League: 6
  - 1977, 1978, 1979, 1986, 1989, 2011
- Taça Regional de São Tomé: 5
  - 1985, 1986, 2001, 2007, 2011

== Seasons ==
=== Season to season ===
Season	Division	Place
1977	1ª	1st
1978	1ª	1st
1979	1ª	1st
1980	1ª	2nd
1981	1ª	2nd
1982	1ª	3rd
1984	1ª	2nd
1985	1ª	2nd
1986	1ª	1st
1988	1ª	2nd
1989	1ª	1st
1990	1ª	4th
1991	1ª	2nd

Season	Division	Place
1993	1ª	3rd
1994	1ª	7th
1995	1ª	2nd
1996	1ª	2nd
1997	1ª	2nd
1998	1ª	3rd
1999	1ª	3rd
2000	1ª	3rd
2001	1ª	5th
2003	1ª	2nd
2004	1ª	2nd
2007	1ª	2nd
2009–10	1ª	2nd

Season	Division	Place
2011	1ª	1st
2012	1ª	4th
2012–13	1ª	3rd
2014	1ª	4th

- 6 seasons on 1st place.
- 13 seasons on 2nd place.
- 6 seasons on 3rd place.
- 2 seasons on 4th place.
- 1 season on 5th place.
- 1 season on 7th place.

== League and cup history ==
Season	Div.	Pos.	Pl.	W	D	L	GS	GA	GD	P	Cup	Qualification/relegation
2011	2	1	21	15	2	4	35	15	+20	47	Winner	Advanced into the National Championships
2012	2	4	18	8	3	7	23	18	+5	27		
2013	2	3	18	9	4	5	24	20	+4	24		
2014	2	4	18	-	-	-	-	-	-	-		
2015	2	4	18	7	6	5	24	22	+2	27		
2016	2	4	22	-	-	-	-	-	-	-		
2017	2	8	22	6	8	8	29	29	0	26		

== Statistics ==
- Best position: 1st (national)
- Best position at cup competitions: 1st (national)
- Appearances at a Super cup competition:
- Appearances:
  - National: 6
  - Regional: 32
- Appearance at a national cup competition: 8
