= Boa Morte, São Tomé and Príncipe =

Boa Morte
- Location on São Tomé Island
- Coordinates: 0.3403°N 6.7178°E
- Country: São Tomé and Príncipe
- Island: São Tomé
- District: Água Grande

Population (2012)
  - Total: 3,432
- Time zone: UTC+1 (WAT)

Boa Morte is a suburb of the city São Tomé in the nation of São Tomé and Príncipe. Its total population is 3,432 (2012 census).

== Population history ==
Historical population
Year	Pop.	±%
2001	2,584	—
2008	2,945	+14.0%
2012	3,432	+16.5%
