= Ponta Figo =

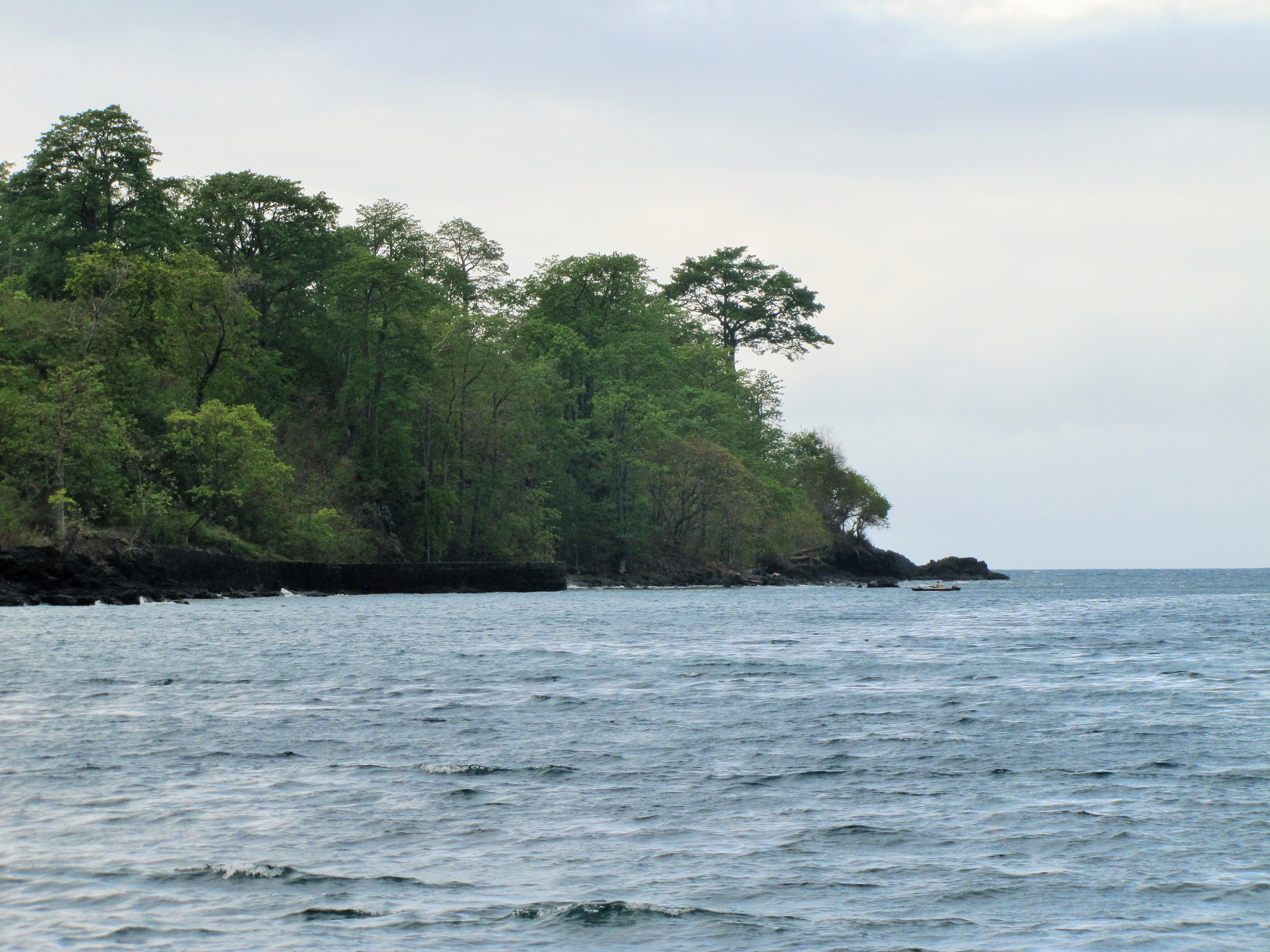
- The shores in the vicinity of Ponta Figo

- Location on São Tomé Island
- Coordinates: 0°20′40″N 6°32′40″E
- Country: São Tomé and Príncipe
- Island: São Tomé
- District: Lembá

Population (2012)
  - Total: 615
- Time zone: UTC+1 (WAT)

Ponta Figo is a village on São Tomé Island. It is 2 km south of Neves. Its population is 615 (2012 census).

== Population history ==
Historical population
Year	Pop.	±%
2001	608	—
2008	693	+14.0%
2012	615	−11.3%
