= Correia, São Tomé and Príncipe =

Correia
- Village
- Location on São Tomé Island
- Coordinates: 0.3348°N 6.7024°E
- Country: São Tomé and Príncipe
- Island: São Tomé
- District: Água Grande

Population (2012)
  - Total: 575
- Time zone: UTC+1 (WAT)

Correia is a settlement in the Água Grande District on São Tomé Island in São Tomé and Príncipe. Its population is 575 (2012 census). Located 3 km west of the city centre of São Tomé, it forms a part of the São Tomé Urban area. Before ca. 2010, it was part of the Lobata District.

== Population history ==
Historical population
Year	Pop.	±%
2001	558	—
2008	636	+14.0%
2012	575	−9.6%

== Sports ==
The football club of the village is UD Correia.
