= São Tomé and Príncipe Championship =

Association football league in São Tomé and Príncipe

São Tomé and Principe Championship
- Founded: 1977
- Country: São Tomé and Príncipe
- Confederation: CAF
- Number of clubs: 18
- Level on pyramid: 1
- Domestic cup(s): Taça Nacional de São Tomé e Principe; São Tomé and Príncipe Super Cup
- International cup(s): Champions League; Confederation Cup
- Current champions: Sport Operário e Benfica (2025)
- Most championships: Sporting Praia Cruz (8)
- Broadcaster(s): TVS and RTP Africa
- Current: 2026 São Tomé and Príncipe Championship

São Tomé and Príncipe Championship (Portuguese: Campeonato Nacional) is the top division of the São Toméan Football Federation. In the 2021/22 season there were 18 teams participating in two leagues – 12 teams from São Tomé Island, whose league has two relegation places, alongside 6 teams from Príncipe Island, which operates as a single division with no relegation.

The championship is decided in a match between the São Tomé Island champions and the Príncipe Island champions. The champion heads to the qualifying round of the CAF Champions League each season, for some seasons, there were no participants. Since 1998, the champion competes in the São Tomé and Príncipe Super Cup in the following year. Like Cape Verde further to the northwest in the Atlantic, they are the only two countries in Africa where only the title of each national subdivision spends only a year in the competition and being the few remaining nations to do so. Unlike Cape Verde, it may be the only remaining nation that the national championship consists just the knockout phase and also just the finals match.

The championships are broadcast each year on the state network TVS and across Africa on RTP África. The best-attended league games took place in front of hundreds of spectators.

== History ==
Before independence on 12 July 1975, there was a colonial competition which took place, with the first season played in 1935.

The inaugural season started in February 1977. From that time to 1985, the São Tomé Regional championships was the only competition and was considered the national competition. Its first competition featuring a Príncipe club was in 1985 when they had their first championship season. The São Tomé regionals was again the national champion in 1986, 1991 and from 1994 to 1996.

A few cancellations occurred including 1983, 1987, 1992 1997, 2002, from 2005 to 2006 and in 2008, there was no single season competition in 2010 as the 2009–10 season continued that time.

=== Title history ===
Vitória Riboque won the first title after independence in 1977 and won three successive titles, from that time up to 2007, it held the most titles per club. It was shared with Sporting Praia Cruz in 2007 and shared it for six years until the club became the one who possesses the most championship titles in the nation and being current champions and won ten titles. Guadalupe was the second club to get a title in 1980, then Sporting Praia Cruz, Andorinha, 6 de Setembro Os Operários, the first club from Príncipe to get at title. Later Santana became the seventh club to get a title in 1991, Inter Bom-Bom in 1995, Bairros Unidos in 1996. Sundy became a second Príncipe club to get a title in 2010 and the recent Sporting Príncipe in 2011. The last time a club from Príncipe won a championship title was in 2012. Its recent club to get a title was UDRA, the twelfth one in 2014.

Sporting Praia Cruz won the most titles numbering 8, followed by Vitória Riboque with 5, Os Operários with four, Inter Bom-Bom with three, Bairros Unidos, Guadalupe, Sporting Príincipe and now UDRA of São João dos Angolares with two and seventh and remaining are with a single title including 6 de Setembro, Andorinha, Santana and Sundy. 9 out of 12 clubs who won a championship title are from the island of São Tomé.

By island, São Tomé has the most champ titles with 23 over Príncipe's 7 titles won by two clubs. By district, Água Grande of São Tomé is the leader with 15 which is less than half, Pagué of Príncipe has 7 titles (more than 20%), the remaining are of São Tomé, Me-Zochi has five, Lobata and now Caué has each two and Cantagalo has one. Lobata, Cantagalo and Caué's totals were won by only a club each. 6 of the 7 districts has a club (or more) who won a title or more, Lembá is the only district which a club never won any national titles.

Until 1980, all the titles were based in the Água Grande District, in 1980, Lobata became the second district to have titles. Pagué became third to have a title, Cantagalo became fourth and Me-Zochi became fifth. In 1993, Pagué shared Lobata's totals in 1993 being second, in 1996, Me-Zochi shared with the two districts being second in title rankings by district. This changed as Pagué became second in title totals in 1998 which was later shared with Me-Zochi in 2000 and put Lobata's total third, that district superseded Pagué's in second most title titles in 2001 and putting that district third, Lobata fourth and Cantagalo last. Me-Zochi held the second most titles by district in 2001 and lasted until 2010 when it became shared, since 2011, again Pagué has the second most title totals and again put Me-Zochi third. In 2014, Caué became the recent district to have a title. In 2017, Caué is now sharing with Lobata with the fourth most titles by district.

== Clubs 2021/22 ==
Promoted

- Guadalupe
- UD Correia

Relegated

- Folha Fede
- Santana

Note: Promotion and relegation decided from the 2019/20 season, as 2020/21 was not played due to the COVID-19 pandemic.

São Tomé

| Club | Location | Stadium | Capacity |
|---|---|---|---|
| Agrosport | Monte Café | Estádio Nacional 12 de Julho | 6.500 |
| Aliança Nacional | Água Izé | Campo de Pantufo | 1,000 |
| Caixão Grande | Caixão Grande | Campo de Bairros Unidos | 1,000 |
| Guadalupe | Guadalupe | Campo de Futebol | 1,000 |
| Militar 6 Setembro | São Tomé | Estádio Nacional 12 de Julho | 6.500 |
| Palmar Lusitano | Água Porca | Unknown | Unknown |
| Sporting Praia Cruz | São Tomé | Estádio Nacional 12 de Julho | 6.500 |
| Sporting São Tomé | São Tomé | Unknown | Unknown |
| Trindade | Trindade | Unknown | Unknown |
| UD Correia | Correia | Unknown | Unknown |
| UDRA | Ribeira Peixe | Campo de Ribeira Peixe | 1,000 |
| Vitória | Riboque | Estádio Nacional 12 de Julho | 6,500 |

Príncipe

| Club | Location | Stadium | Capacity |
|---|---|---|---|
| 1º de Maio | Santo António | Campo de Futebol | 1,000 |
| Operário | Santo António | Campo de Futebol | 1,000 |
| Porto Real | Porto Real | Campo de Futebol | 1,000 |
| Sporting Príncipe | Santo António | Campo de Futebol | 1,000 |
| Sundy | Sundi | Campo de Futebol | 1,000 |
| UDAPB | Picão e Belo Monte | Campo de Futebol | 1,000 |

== Previous winners ==
=== Before independence ===
- 1935–37: Unknown
- 1938: Andorinha
- 1939: Sport Lisboa e São Tomé 1–0 Bombeiros
- 1940–51: Unknown
- 1952: Sporting Clube de São Tomé
- 1953: Sindicato
- 1954–58: Unknown
- 1959: No competition
- 1960–62: Unknown
- 1963: Porto de São Tomé
- 1964: Porto de São Tomé
- 1965: Andorinha
- 1966: Sporting Clube de São Tomé
- 1967: Andorinha
- 1968: Andorinha
- 1969: Andorinha
- 1970: Andorinha
- 1971: Sporting Clube de São Tomé
- 1972: Not known
- 1973: Andorinha
- 1974: Not known

==== Performance by club ====
| Club | Winners | Winning years |
|---|---|---|
| Andorinha | 7 | 1938, 1965, 1967, 1968, 1968/69, 1970, 1973 |
| Sporting Clube de São Tomé | 3 | 1952, 1966, 1971 |
| Porto de São Tomé | 2 | 1963, 1964 |
| Sport Lisboa e São Tomé | 1 | 1939 |
| Sindicato | 1 | 1953 |

=== Since independence ===
- 1977 : Vitória FC (Riboque)
- 1978 : Vitória FC (Riboque)
- 1979 : Vitória FC (Riboque)
- 1980 : CD Guadalupe
- 1981 : CD Guadalupe
- 1982 : Sporting Praia Cruz
- 1983 : no championship
- 1984 : Andorinha SC (Ponta Mina)
- 1985 : Sporting Praia Cruz
- 1986 : Vitória FC (Riboque)
- 1987 : no championship
- 1988 : 6 de Setembro (Praia)
- 1989 : Vitória FC (Riboque)
- 1990 : GD Os Operários
- 1991 : Santana FC
- 1992 : no championship
- 1993 : GD Os Operários
- 1994 : Sporting Praia Cruz
- 1995 : Inter FC (Bom Bom)
- 1996 : Caixão Grande
- 1997 : no championship
- 1998 : GD Os Operários
- 1999 : Sporting Praia Cruz
- 2000 : Inter FC (Bom Bom)
- 2001 : Bairros Unidos FC (Caixão Grande)
- 2002 : no championship
- 2003 : Inter FC (Bom Bom)
- 2004 : GD Os Operários
- 2005 : no championship
- 2006 : no championship
- 2007 : Sporting Praia Cruz
- 2008 : no championship
- 2009–10 : GD Sundy
- 2011 : Sporting Clube do Príncipe
- 2012 : Sporting Clube do Príncipe
- 2013 : Sporting Praia Cruz
- 2014 : UDRA
- 2015 : Sporting Praia Cruz
- 2016 : Sporting Praia Cruz
- 2017 : UDRA
- 2018 : UDRA
- 2019 : Agrosport
- 2020 : Not held
- 2021–22 : GD Os Operários
- 2023 : 6 de Setembro
- 2024 : Agrosport
- 2025: Sport Operário e Benfica

==== Performance by club ====
| Club | Winners | Winning years |
|---|---|---|
| Sporting Praia Cruz | 8 | 1982, 1985, 1994, 1999, 2007, 2013, 2015, 2016 |
| GD Os Operários | 6 | 1990, 1993, 1998, 2004, 2021–22, 2025 |
| Vitória FC | 5 | 1977, 1978, 1979, 1986, 1989 |
| Inter FC | 3 | 1995, 2000, 2003 |
| UDRA | 3 | 2014, 2017, 2018 |
| Bairros Unidos FC^{1} | 2 | 1996, 2001 |
| CD Guadalupe | 2 | 1980, 1981 |
| Sporting Clube do Príncipe | 2 | 2011, 2012 |
| 6 de Setembro | 2 | 1988, 2023 |
| Agrosport | 2 | 2019, 2024 |
| Andorinha SC | 1 | 1984 |
| Santana FC | 1 | 1991 |
| GD Sundy | 1 | 2009–10 |

- ^{1}also known as Caixão Grande

==== Performance By Island ====
| Island | Winners | District | Winners | Winning years |
|---|---|---|---|---|
| São Tomé | 29 | Água Grande | 15 | 1977, 1978, 1979, 1982, 1984 1985, 1986, 1988, 1989, 1994, 1999, 2007, 2013, 2015, 2016 |
| São Tomé | 29 | Caué | 3 | 2014, 2017, 2018 |
| São Tomé | 29 | Cantagalo | 2 | 1991, 2023 |
| São Tomé | 29 | Lobata | 2 | 1980, 1981 |
| São Tomé | 29 | Mé-Zóchi | 7 | 1995, 1996, 2000, 2001, 2003, 2019, 2024 |
| Príncipe | 8 | Pagué | 8 | 1990, 1993, 1998, 2004, 2009–10, 2011, 2012, 2021–22 |
