= Lembá District =

District of São Tomé and Príncipe

Lembá
- District
- Location within São Tomé and Príncipe
- Coordinates: 0°16′52″N 6°29′58″E
- Country: São Tomé and Príncipe
- Island: São Tomé
- Seat: Neves

Area
  - Total: 229.5 km^{2} (88.6 sq mi)

Population (2012)
  - Total: 14,652
  - Density: 63.84/km^{2} (165.4/sq mi)
- Time zone: UTC+0 (UTC)

Lembá is a district of São Tomé and Príncipe, on São Tomé Island. Its area is 229.5 km^{2} (89 sq mi), and its population is 14,652 (2012). The district seat is Neves. It is divided into the two statistical subdistricts Neves and Santa Catarina.

== Geography ==
Much of the district lies within Parque Natural Obô de São Tomé. The district has the nation's highest point, Pico de São Tomé. The river Xufexufe flows through the district. A few islets are adjacent to the island coast including Gabado and Ilhéu de São Miguel.

== Population ==
Population of Lembá District (1940—2012)

Year	Pop.	±%
1940	6,895	—
1950	6,255	−9.3%
1960	6,234	−0.3%

Year	Pop.	±%
1970	6,199	−0.6%
1981	7,905	+27.5%
1991	9,016	+14.1%

Year	Pop.	±%
2001	10,696	+18.6%
2012	14,652	+37.0%

Sources: 1940–2012, 2001–2012

== Settlements ==
The main settlement is the town Neves. Other settlements are:

- Diogo Vaz
- Generosa
- Lembá
- Monte Forte
- Ponta Figo
- Praia de Ponta Figo
- Ribeira Funda
- Rosema
- Santa Catarina
- São José

== Politics ==
Lembá currently has six seats in the National Assembly.

== Twin towns and sister cities ==
Lembá District is twinned with:

- Crato, Portugal
- Santa Marta de Penaguião, Portugal
