= Ponta Mina =

- Location on São Tomé Island
- Coordinates: 0.3354°N 6.7345°E
- Country: São Tomé and Príncipe
- Island: São Tomé
- District: Água Grande

Population (2012)
  - Total: 984
- Time zone: UTC+1 (WAT)

Ponta Mina is a subdivision of the city São Tomé in the nation of São Tomé and Príncipe. Its population is 984 (2012 census). It lies directly east of the city center of São Tomé.

== Population history ==
Historical population
| Year | Pop. | ±% |
|---|---|---|
| 2001 | 580 | — |
| 2008 | 661 | +14.0% |
| 2012 | 984 | +48.9% |
