= Santa Catarina, São Tomé and Príncipe =

Santa Catarina
- Village
- Location on São Tomé Island
- Coordinates: 0.2703°N 6.4730°E
- Country: São Tomé and Príncipe
- Island: São Tomé
- District: Lembá

Population (2012)
  - Total: 1,862
- Time zone: UTC+1 (WAT)

Santa Catarina (Portuguese for Saint Catherine) is a village on the western coast of São Tomé Island in the district of Lembá of São Tomé and Príncipe. Its population is 1,862 (2012 census). It lies 13 km southwest of Neves.

== Population history ==
Year	Population
2001 (census)	1,290
2008 (est.)	1,470
2012 (census)	1,862
