= GD Kê Morabeza =

Kě Morabeza
- Full name: Grupo Desportivo Kě Morabeza
- Ground: Neves on São Tomé Island, São Tomé and Príncipe
- League: São Tomé Island League
- 2016: Premier Division

Grupo Desportivo Kê Morabeza is a football (soccer) club that plays in the São Tomé and Príncipe Championship. The team is based in the village of Bela Vista in Lobata District in the island of São Tomé and currently is out of competition since 2013 along with three other clubs.

Until 2012, the club was called Grupo Desportivo Vitória Bela Vista. Once had the name VItória, it was predominantly never an affiliate to a Portuguese club Vitória FC of Setúbal.

The club played in the second division, in 2001, the club was eight, in 2002/03, the club was fifth. The club never gained promotion into the First Division for some seasons.

In 2012, the club changed its name to Kě Morabeza, its name meaning the hospitality. The club was in the top two positions of the regional Second Division in 2014. The club returned to the First Division in 2015 and under the current club name, they were relegated into the Second Division in 2016 and currently participates there, in September 2017, the club suffered as they were inside the relegation zone and in the following season will participate in the Third Division.

== League and cup history ==
=== Island championships ===
Season	Div.	Pos.	Pl.	W	D	L	GS	GA	GD	P	Cup	Qualification/relegation
2016	2	12	18	2	3	17	-	-	-	9		Relegated into the Regional Second Division
