= CD de Guadalupe =

Football club in São Tomé and Príncipe

Desportivo de Guadalupe
- Founded: 31 March 1964; 62 years ago
- Ground: Campo dos Lobatos; Guadalupe, Lobata District, São Tomé Island, São Tomé and Príncipe
- Chairman: Valdomiro Costa
- Manager: Artur Marques
- League: São Tomé Island League
- 2024: 10th
| Home colours | Away colours |

Clube Desportivo de Guadalupe is a football club that plays in the São Tomé Island League in São Tomé and Príncipe. The team is based in the island of São Tomé and played in the island Second Division as of 2016.

== Logo and Uniform ==
Its logo is blue and yellow.

Its home uniform is blue with two yellow stripes and a middle part, yellow sleeve rims, six thin yellow lines and two yellow lines on its shorts with a rim on the legs portion and two yellow stripes on top of each socks. Its away or alternate colors are opposite with yellow then blue

Its former uniform colors had red shirts and socks with white shorts during home games and its colors opposite during away/alternate games. Its uniform colors between 2014 and 2016 featured blue clothing with yellow sleeves and socks.

| Home uniform up to 2014 | Away uniform up to 2014 | Home uniform from 2014 to 2016 |

== History ==
The club are one of the oldest in the country. The club was founded during the days of colonial rule on March 31, 1964.

The team has won two titles and is the only second team in history to claim its first title in 1980, all of its titles won two in a row, they won their last in 1981. Guadalupe is the only club from Lobata to get a regional and a national competitive honor. The club started their career in the Premier Division and remained until they finished last in the season and relegated to the second division. The club again returned to the second division and remained until 2014 when they were relegated, the team currently plays in the second division.

In championship title total rankings, Guadalupe had the fewest titles which was least up to 1984 and second up to 1985 when it was shared with Sporting Praia Cruz until 1994 when Guadalupe's totals became third behind Praia Cruz, from 1993 to 1998, its title totals were shared with Os Operários of Príncipe and Guadalupe's totals became fourth until 2003, its totals were shared with Inter Bom-Bom from 2000 to 2003 and is currently fifth behind that club, from 2003 to 2004, it was also behind Os Operários. Since 2001, its totals are shared with Bairros Unidos, Sporting Príncipe since 2012 and now UDRA since 2017.

Also the club was the first to win a national cup title. The club advanced into the 2012 São Tomé and Príncipe Cup and faced Sporting Clube do Príncipe and lost 2–1, as Sporting Príncipe was the national winner, Guadalupe was the first ever São Tomean club to enter the CAF Confederation Cup, the club faced US Bitam of Gabon and scored nothing and lost 0–5, Guadalupe scored only a goal in the second leg and their results were awful, Desportivo Guadalupe faced a huge defeat, lost 1–12 to Bitam, one of the largest in history and the largest to a São Tomean team.

In cup title possession rankings, it was shared with Sporting Praia Cruz in 1982, later Vitória Reboque in 1984. Along with a few other clubs, Guadalupe's total became second in 1985, third in 1993 behind Sporting Praia Cruz, fourth behind GD Os Operários of Príncipe in 2003, fifth in 2010 and sixth since 2016.

On March 31, 2014, the club celebrated its 50th year of foundation.

== Honours ==
- National:
  - São Tomé and Príncipe Championships: 2

1980, 1981

  - Taça Nacional de São Tomé e Principe: 1

1981

  - São Tomé and Príncipe Super Cup: 1

2013

- Regional:
  - São Tomé Island League: 2

1980, 1981

  - Taça Regional de São Tomé: 2

1981, 2012

- Other:
  - Solidarity Cup: 1

2000

  - March 12 Cup: 1

1989

== League and cup history ==
=== Performance in African competitions ===
Guadalupe's results in CAF competition
| Season | Competition | Qualification method | Round | Opposition | Home | Away | Aggregate |
|---|---|---|---|---|---|---|---|
| 2013 | CAF Confederation Cup | São Tomé and Príncipe cup winners | Preliminary Round | (Gabon) US Bitam | 0–5 | 12–1 | 1–17 |

=== Island championships ===
| Season | Div. | Pos. | Pl. | W | D | L | GS | GA | GD | P | Cup | Qualification/relegation |
|---|---|---|---|---|---|---|---|---|---|---|---|---|
| 2011 | 2 | 9 | 21 | 6 | 8 | 7 | 20 | 25 | -5 | 26 | | Relegated to the Second Division |
| 2012 | 3 | | 18 | - | - | - | - | - | - | - | | Advanced into the Regional Premier Division |
| 2013 | 2 | 7 | 18 | 5 | 3 | 10 | 18 | 33 | -15 | 18 | Finalist | None |
| 2014 | 2 | | 18 | - | - | - | - | - | - | - | | Relegated into the Second Division |
| 2017 | 3 | 3 | 18 | - | - | - | - | - | - | - | | |

== Statistics ==
- Best position: 1st (national)
- Best position at cup competitions: 1st (national)
- Appearances:
  - National: 2
- Appearance at a national cup competition: 1
- Appearance at a continental cup competition: 1
- Total matches scored at a continental cup competition: 2
- Total goals scored at a continental cup competition: 1
- Total goals conceded at a continental cup competition: 17
