= Folha Fede =

- Village
- Location on São Tomé Island
- Coordinates: 0.2838°N 6.6887°E
- Country: São Tomé and Príncipe
- Island: São Tomé
- District: Mé-Zóchi

Population (2012)
  - Total: 831
- Time zone: UTC+1 (WAT)

Folha Fede is a village on São Tomé Island in the nation of São Tomé and Príncipe. Its population is 831 (2012 census). It lies 1.5 km southeast of Trindade.

== Population history ==
Historical population
| Year | Pop. | ±% |
|---|---|---|
| 2001 | 757 | — |
| 2008 | 863 | +14.0% |
| 2012 | 831 | −3.7% |

== Sporting club ==
- Porto Folha Fede - football (soccer) -- currently plays in the São Tomé First Division as of the 2015 season
