= Ribeira Peixe =

- Location on São Tomé Island
- Coordinates: 0°5′25″N 6°36′55″E
- Country: São Tomé and Príncipe
- Island: São Tomé
- District: Caué

Population (2012)
  - Total: 503
- Time zone: UTC+1 (WAT)

Ribeira Peixe (formerly: Perseverança) is a seaside village on São Tomé Island in the nation of São Tomé and Príncipe. Its population is 503 (2012 census). It lies 1 km southwest of Praia Pesqueira and 6 km southwest of São João dos Angolares. There was a plantation complex (roça) at Ribeira Peixe, that produced cocoa, copra, coconut and palm oil.

== Population history ==
Historical population
Year	Pop.	±%
2001	476	—
2008	543	+14.1%
2012	503	−7.4%
