= Oque del Rei =

- Location on São Tomé Island
- Coordinates: 0.348°N 6.712°E
- Country: São Tomé and Príncipe
- Island: São Tomé
- District: Água Grande

Population (2012)
  - Total: 3,465
- Time zone: UTC+1 (WAT)

Oque del Rei is a suburb of the city São Tomé in the nation of São Tomé and Príncipe. Its population is 3,465 (2012 census).

== Population history ==
Historical population
| Year | Pop. | ±% |
|---|---|---|
| 2001 | 3,455 | — |
| 2008 | 3,938 | +14.0% |
| 2012 | 3,465 | −12.0% |

== Sporting club ==
- CD Oque d'El Rei - football (soccer)
