= Sporting Clube de São Tomé =

- Full name: Sporting Clube de São Tomé
- Ground: Estádio Nacional 12 de Julho, São Tomé Island, São Tomé and Príncipe
- Capacity: 6,500
- League: São Tomé Island Second Division
- 2017: 1st, Promoted

Sporting Clube de São Tomé is a football club based in the national capital São Tomé, in the island of São Tomé in São Tomé and Príncipe. The team is part of the São Tome Island Football Association and the Santomean Football Association. The club is historically the second best club both on the island and in the nation.

== History ==
Sporting São Tomé is the fathering club of Sporting Clube de Portugal and is the 183rd affiliate.

The team was one of the archipelago's first. Their first provincial title was won in 1952, their second was won in 1966 and their last was in 1971. Sporting São Tomé alongside Andorinha and the club now Porto de Folha Fede never won any titles after independence in 1975.

In recent years, the club was relegated into the Second Division and later relegated into the Third Division until 2015 when they were in the top two positions and returned to the Second Division for two seasons, in September 2017, the club finished first with 42 wins, 13 wins, 3 draws and a marvelous 71 goals which was the highest in several seasons for the club, with the mainstreams of a few high scoring matches with the highest, a victory over Oque del Rei 0-10 which was the highest match in the nation of any tiers or levels. That gave a might a club actually being the top five of the nation. Sporting São Tomé will return yet again to the regional Premier Division in several years.

== Logo ==
Its logo is the same as to that of Sporting Lisbon.

== Uniform ==
Its uniform is identical to Sporting CP, but several are different from Sporting Lisbon's.

== Honours ==
- São Tomé and Príncipe Championship: 3
  - Before independence: 3

1952, 1966, 1971

== League and cup history ==
=== Island championships ===
Season	Div.	Pos.	Pl.	W	D	L	GS	GA	GD	P	Cup	Qualification/relegation
2017	3	1	18	13	3	2	71	31	+40	42		Promoted into the Premier Division

== Statistics ==
- Highest number of goals scored in a season: 71 (regional), in 2017

== See also ==
- Sporting Clube do Príncipe, another Sporting Club in the nation located in the island of Príncipe
- Sporting Praia Cruz, another Sporting Club in the nation located in the island of São Tomé
