= CD Oque d'El Rei =

- Full name: Clube Desportivo Oque d'El Rei
- Ground: Campo de Santo Amaro, Oque d'El Rei, São Tomé and Príncipe
- Capacity: 1000
- League: São Tomé and Principe Championship
- 2025: 11th

Clube Desportivo Oque del Rei (then as Desportivo Oque d'El Rei) is a football club that is based in the village of Oque d'El Rei in São Tomé and Príncipe. The team plays in the São Tomé and Principe Championship, the team was playing in the top local division that started in 2009 up to 2014, it now plays in the second local division as of the 2015 season.

In their first appearance in the island first division, the club finished scoreless in their debut match of the season with 6 de Setembro.

Its logo has a green shield, the club name circles the shield and has a soccer ball on the top left, the light green star on the bottom and two hands making a handshake in the middle.

== Stadium ==
Currently the team plays at the 1000 capacity Campo de Santo Amaro.
