= UD Correia =

Correia
- Founded: 2000
- Ground: Correia, São Tomé Island, São Tomé and Príncipe
- League: São Tomé First Division
- 2017: 11th, Relegated

União Desportivo Correia is a football club that is based in the settlement of Correia west of the national capital São Tomé in the island of São Tomé in São Tomé and Príncipe. The team plays in the São Tomé Island League. It never won any titles.

The club was founded in 2000, not long after, it became a registered club of the country. In 2010, the club celebrated its 10th anniversary of its foundation. In the 2000s, they played in the second division, as of the 2016 season, they played in the regional Premier Division.

Its logo has a light blue star with a green soccer ball in the middle.

== League and cup history ==
=== Island championships ===
Season	Div.	Pos.	Pl.	W	D	L	GS	GA	GD	P	Cup	Qualification/relegation
2015	2	8	18	5	6	7	27	25	+2	21		
2016	2	10	18	4	5	13	22	49	-27	17		
2017	2	11	22	5	6	11	26	37	-11	15		Relegated into the Second Division

== Statistics ==
- Appearances at the regional competitions: 11
- Appearances at the regional cup competitions: 10
