= Amador (football) =

- Full name: Desportivo Amador da Empresa Agostinho
- Ground: Agostinho Neto, São Tomé Island; São Tomé and Príncipe
- League: São Tomé Island League
- 2015: Second Division

Desportivo Amador da Empresa Agostinho is a football club that plays in the island of São Tomé in São Tomé and Príncipe. It is based in the village of Agostinho Neto west of the national capital São Tomé. The team plays in the São Tomé Island League's second division. It never won any titles.

Amador had played for many years in the Second Division. In 2001, Amador finished third in the Premier Division and in the 2002–03 season, the club was eighth. The club hasn't returned to the First Division in recent years. As of 2015, the club played in the Second Division.

== League and cup history ==
=== Island championships ===
Season	Div.	Pos.	Pl.	W	D	L	GS	GA	GD	P	Cup	Qualification/relegation
2016	3	3	18	-	-	-	-	-	-	-		Promoted into the Regional Third Division

== Statistics ==
- Best position: 3rd (regional)
