= Desportivo Marítimo =

Clube Desportivo Marítimo Micoló
- Ground: Micoló on São Tomé Island, São Tomé and Príncipe
- League: São Tomé Island League
- 2015: Second Division

Clube Desportivo Marítimo Micoló is a football club that plays in the village of Micoló located near Guadalupe in the island of São Tomé Island League in São Tomé and Príncipe. The team never won any titles.

The club took part in the 2001 island cup where they succeeded as high as the semifinal match. The club was in the second division until they were qualified into the island first division in the 2006–07 season and then relegated again.

In the Second Division, the club played for Zone B for the 2011 season and did not compete above the Second Division. In 2016, Micoló was inside the relegation zone after finishing 11th, the last two position and thus was relegated. Marítimo Micoló is now in the island's lowest, the third division for the season.

== League and cup history ==
=== Island championships ===
Season	Div.	Pos.	Pl.	W	D	L	GS	GA	GD	P	Cup	Qualification/relegation
2011	3B		-	-	-	-	-	-	-	-		
2016	3	11	18	-	-	-	-	-	-	-		Relegated into the Regional Third Division
