= Andorinha Sport Club =

Andorinha
- Full name: Andorinha Sporting Club
- Founded: 1931
- Ground: Estádio Nacional 12 de Julho; São Tomé Island, São Tomé and Príncipe
- Capacity: 6,500
- League: São Tomé and Príncipe Championship
- 2014/15: Second Division
Home colours	Away colours

Andorinha Sport Club is a football club that plays in the São Tomé and Príncipe Championship. The team is based in the neighbourhood of Ponta Mina near Praia Cruz in the island of São Tomé.

== History ==
The club was founded in 1931 and is one of the oldest sport clubs in the nation.

The team won their first colonial title in the 1938, in 1970, Andorinha won five straight provincial titles. Andorinha won their last provincial title in 1973, two years before São Tomé and Príncipe gained independence.

1968/69 season. In 1984, Andorinha won their first title after independence and is the fourth team in history to do so and is the only title won by the team.

In 1981, the club celebrated its 50th anniversary, in 2006, it celebrated its 75th anniversary of foundation.

Andorinha was finished and deprived of continuing in the island Premier Division in 2010, the club competed in the second division between 2011 and 2014 until they were deprived of continuing after being in the last two places and since 2015, Andorinha competes in the third division.

== Stadium ==
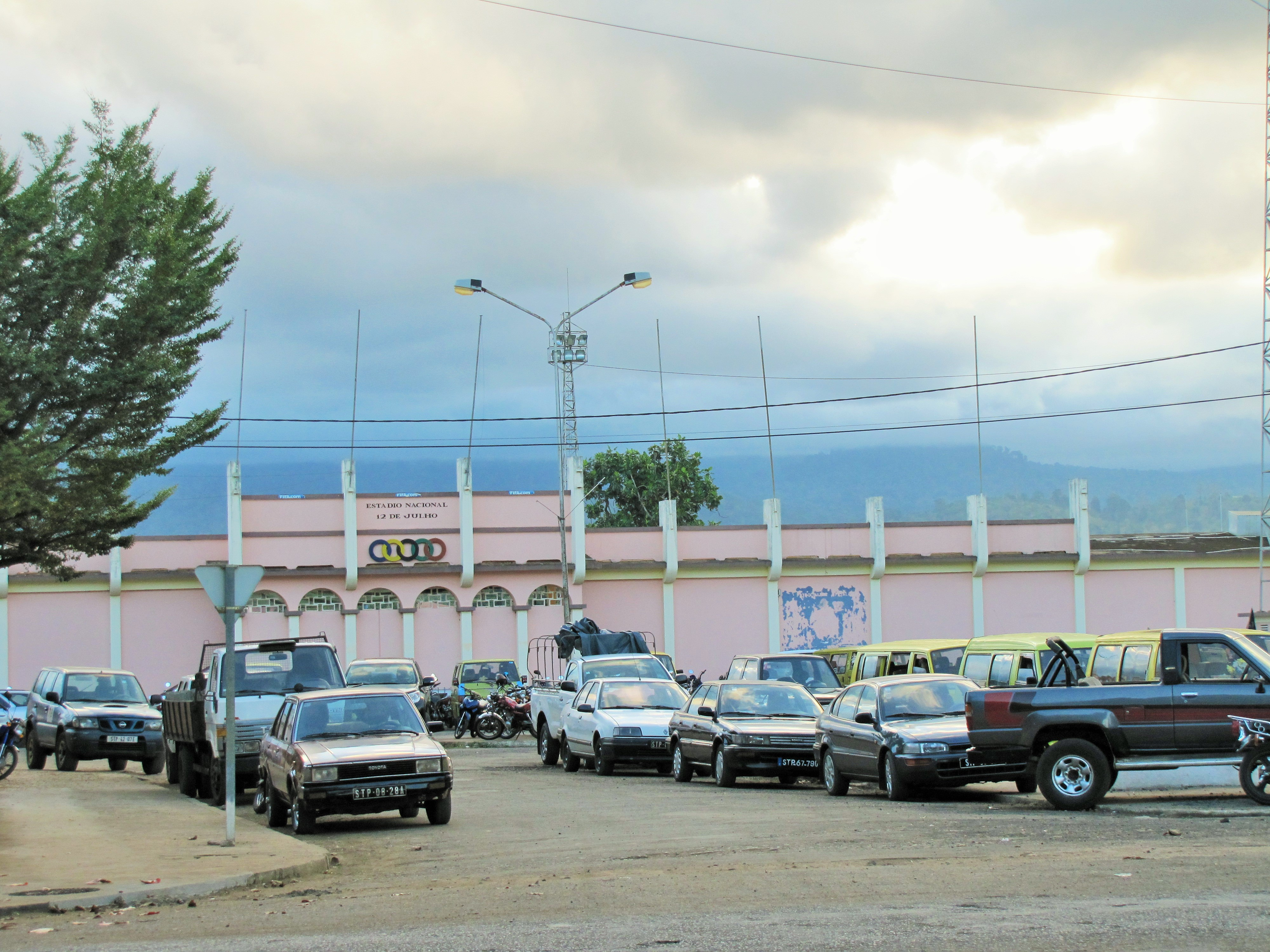
Esádio Nacional 12 de Julho

Estádio Nacional 12 de Julho is a multi-use stadium in São Tomé, São Tomé and Príncipe. It is currently used mostly for football matches. The stadium holds 6,500. Its address is Avenidas das Nações Unidas. The stadium is home to the three best football clubs in the nation and the island including Sporting Praia Cruz, Aliança Nacional, Andorinha and Vitória Riboque.

The club also trains and practices at the stadium.

== Logo and uniform ==
Its logo features a white crest (of the neighbourhood) with ASC on top then left and right. Its home uniform are colored blue with a yellow short.

Home uniform up to 2016

== Honours ==
- São Tomé and Príncipe Championships: 8

Before independence: 7

1938, 1965, 1967, 1968, 1968/69, 1970, 1973

Since independence: 1

1984

- São Tomé and Príncipe Cup: 3
  - Before independence:

1960, 1967, 1970

- São Tomé Island League: 8

Before independence: 7

1938, 1965, 1967, 1968, 1968/69, 1970, 1973

Since independence: 1

1984

== League and cup history ==
=== Positions ===
- 10th (2015) - Third Division

=== Statistics ===
- Best position: 1st (national)
- Appearances at the National Championships:
  - National: 1
