= Porto Folha Fede =

Os Dinâmicos
- Nickname: Unknown
- Ground: Folha Fede on São Tomé Island, São Tomé and Príncipe
- League: São Tomé Island League
- 2016: Premier Division

Folha Fede FC, also as Porto de Folha Fede or Portuense de Folha Fede and Os Dinâmicos Folha Fede (Portuguese; English: The Dynamics) is a football club that plays in the São Tomé Island League in Folha Fede in São Tomé and Príncipe. The team is based in the island of São Tomé. The team never claimed any national and insular titles.

Its logo has a blue color with Folha Fede's town crest on top and the club acronym PFF on the bottom. The logo and the uniform are nearly the same as FC Porto's. The club is an affiliate to Portugal's FC Porto and is the only one in the nation.

The club was founded as FC Porto e São Tomé and is rarely called under that name today. It was founded in the mid-20th century during Portuguese rule in the city of São Tomé. The club won two straight and only provincial titles in 1964.

After independence, the club's location moved to Folha Fede.

In 2001, the club finished fourth in the championship. The club was relegated into the Second Division in 2003. The club finished 11th in 2006, in 2009–10, the club was in the Second Division but later returned to the Premier Division

== Honours ==
- São Tomé and Príncipe Provincial Championships: 2

1963, 1964

== League and cup history ==
=== Island championships ===
Season	Div.	Pos.	Pl.	W	D	L	GS	GA	GD	P	Cup	Qualification/relegation
2015	2	5	18	7	6	5	30	15	+15	27		
2016	2	9	18	5	4	13	32	39	-7	19		
2017	2	5	22	9	7	6	36	24	+12	34	Quarterfinals	None
