= São Tomé Island League =

Top level of football on São Tomé Island

- Founded: 1950s
- Region: São Tomé Island (and its surroundings), São Tomé and Príncipe
- Number of clubs: 12 (Premier Division); 10 (Second and Third Divisions)
- Promotion to: São Tomé and Príncipe Championship
- Domestic cup: São Tomé Island Cup
- Current champions: UDRA (3rd time) (2018)
- Most championships: Sporting Praia Cruz (9)

São Tomé Island League is the top division of the São Toméan Football Federation for the São Tomé Island. The champion competes at the national championships each year.

== History ==
Before independence, it was the only regional competition in the nation. It was the sole competition in the country and was acted as a national competition until 1985 when the Príncipe League were founded. From 1986 to 1988, 1991, 1992 and 1994 to 1997 as the other island's competitions were not held, the island champions were also national champions.

== São Tomé League – clubs 2017 ==
=== First Division ===
- Agrosport
- FC Aliança Nacional – Pantufo
- Bairros Unidos FC – Caixão Grande
- Correia – Correia
- Os Dinâmicos (Porto) Folha Fede
- Inter Bom-Bom
- Clube Desportivo de Neves (Neves)
- Sporting Praia Cruz (Praia Cruz)
- Trindade FC
- UDRA (São João dos Angolares)
- UDESCAI (Água Izé)
- Vitória FC (Riboque)

=== Second Division ===
- 6 de Setembro (Santana)
- Amador
- Boavista FC Uba Budo
- CD Guadalupe (Guadalupe)
- Kê Morabeza (Bela Vista)
- Oque d'El Rey (Oque d'El Rei)
- Palmar (Palmar)
- Ribeira Peixe (Ribeira Peixe)
- Santana FC (Santana)
- Sporting São Tomé

=== Third Division ===
- Andorinha Sport Club
- Desportivo Conde
- Cruz Vermelha (Almeirim)
- Juba Diogo Simão – withdrew
- Marítimo Micoló
- Otótó
- Porto Alegre (Porto Alegre)
- Santa Margarida (Santa Margarida)
- Varzim FC (Ribeira Afonso)
- Diogo Vaz

== Previous winners ==
- 1977 : Vitória FC
- 1978 : Vitória FC
- 1979 : Vitória FC
- 1980 : Desportivo de Guadalupe
- 1981 : Desportivo de Guadalupe
- 1982 : Sporting Praia Cruz
- 1983 : no championship
- 1984 : Andorinha Sport Club
- 1985 : Sporting Praia Cruz
- 1986 : Vitória FC
- 1987 : no championship
- 1988 : 6 de Setembro
- 1989 : Vitória FC
- 1990 :
- 1991 : Santana FC
- 1992 : no championship
- 1993 :
- 1994 : Sporting Praia Cruz
- 1995 : Inter Bom-Bom
- 1996 : Caixão Grande
- 1997 : no championship
- 1998 :
- 1999 : Sporting Praia Cruz
- 2000 : Inter Bom-Bom
- 2001 : Bairros Unidos FC
- 2002 : no championship
- 2003 : Inter Bom-Bom
- 2004 : UDESCAI
- 2005 : no championship
- 2006 : no championship
- 2007 : Sporting Praia Cruz
- 2008 : no championship
- 2009 : Vitória FC
- 2010 : no championship
- 2011 : Vitória FC
- 2012 : Sporting Praia Cruz
- 2013 : Sporting Praia Cruz
- 2014 : UDRA
- 2015 : Sporting Praia Cruz
- 2016 : Sporting Praia Cruz
- 2017 : UDRA
- 2018 : UDRA

=== Performance by club ===
Club	Winners	Winning years
Sporting Praia Cruz	9	1982, 1985, 1994, 1999, 2007, 2012, 2013, 2015, 2016
Vitória FC	7	1977, 1978, 1979, 1986, 1989, 2009, 2011
Inter Bom-Bom	3	1995, 2000, 2003
UDRA	3	2014, 2017, 2018
Desportivo de Guadalupe	2	1980, 1981
6 de Setembro (Praia)	1	1988
Andorinha Sport Club	1	1984
Bairros Unidos FC	1	2001
Caixão Grande	1	1996
Santana FC	1	1991
UDESCAI	1	2004

=== Performance by district ===
District	Winners	Winning years
Água Grande	19	1977, 1978, 1979, 1982, 1984, 1985, 1986, 1988, 1989, 1994, 1999, 2004, 2007, 2009, 2011, 2012, 2013, 2015, 2016
Mé-Zóchi	5	1995, 1996, 2000, 2001, 2003
Caué	3	2014, 2017, 2018
Lobata	2	1980, 1981
Cantagalo	1	1991
