= Água Grande District =

District of São Tomé and Príncipe

Água Grande
- District
- Location within São Tomé and Príncipe
- Coordinates: 0°20′N 6°44′E
- Country: São Tomé and Príncipe
- Island: São Tomé
- Seat: São Tomé

Area
  - Total: 16.5 km^{2} (6.4 sq mi)

Population (2018)
  - Total: 77,700
  - Density: 4,710/km^{2} (12,200/sq mi)
- Time zone: UTC+0 (UTC)

Água Grande is a district of São Tomé and Príncipe, on São Tomé Island. Its capital, São Tomé, is also the national capital of the equatorial Atlantic island nation of São Tomé and Príncipe. Covering only 16.5 km^{2} (6 sq mi), it is the smallest of the nation's seven districts in terms of area, but the largest in population with 69,454 residents in 2012 rising to an estimated 77,700 in 2018. It is divided into the two statistical subdistricts São Tomé and Pantufo.

== Population ==
Population of Água Grande District (1940—2012)
Year	Population
1940	8,407
1950	7,820
1960	9,575
1970	19,630
1981	32,375
1991	42,331
2001	51,886
2012	69,454

== Settlements ==
The main settlement is the town São Tomé. Other settlements are:

- Água Porca
- Almeirim
- Boa Morte
- Chacara
- Correia
- Madre Deus
- Oque del Rei
- Pantufo
- Ponta Mina
- Quinta Santo António
- Riboque
- São João da Vargem
- São Marçal

== Politics ==
Água Grande currently has 13 seats in the National Assembly.

== Persons ==
- Marcos Barbeiro, footballer
- Guadalupe de Ceita, medic and a politician
- Manuel Pinto da Costa, politician, President of São Tomé and Príncipe from 2011 to 2016
- Adimar Neves, footballer currently living in Europe
- Lecabela Quaresma, athlete

== International relations ==
Água Grande District is twinned with:

- Lisbon, Portugal
