= GD Palmar =

Palmar
- Full name: Grupo Desportivo de Palmar
- Founded: May 1, 1981
- Ground: São Tomé Island, São Tomé and Príncipe
- League: São Tomé Island League
- 2017: Second Division

Grupo Desportivo de Palmar is a football club that plays in the subdivision in the west of the city of São Tomé in the island of São Tomé in São Tomé and Príncipe. The team plays in the São Tomé Island League's second level. It never won any titles.

The club was first founded on May 1, 1981. in 1991, the club celebrated its 10th anniversary, in 2006, the club celebrated its 25th anniversary.

The club was participating in the regional Third Division, the club withdrew in 2014 and did not participated in the 2015 season along with 6 de Setembro. The club returned in the Third Division for the 2016 season and was promoted after being in the top two positions and is currently a club of the Second Division.

Its logo has a flat oval divided into white on top and green on bottom, palm trees are on the sides of the top part and the soccer ball on the bottom, the acronym G.D.P.A.P. is on the bottom of the left-right oval part.
