= Trindade FC =

Football club

Trindade
- Full name: Trindade
- Nickname: Unknown
- Ground: Trindade, São Tomé Island (second level), São Tomé and Príncipe
- League: São Tomé Island League
- 2025: 4th

Trindade FC is a football club that plays in Trindade on the island of São Tomé in São Tomé and Príncipe. The team plays in the São Tomé Island League's first level. It has never won any titles.

After playing for several seasons in the Second Division, the club returned once more into the island's Premier Division in 2016 after being in the top two positions in 2015.

== League and cup history ==
=== Island championships ===
Season	Div.	Pos.	Pl.	W	D	L	GS	GA	GD	P	Cup	Qualification/relegation
2015	2	2	18	-	-	-	-	-	-	-		Promoted into the Regional Premier Division
2016	2	6	22	8	9	5	29	23	+6	33		
2017	2	7	22	7	7	8	38	41	-3	38		
