= Neves, São Tomé and Príncipe =

Neves
- Town
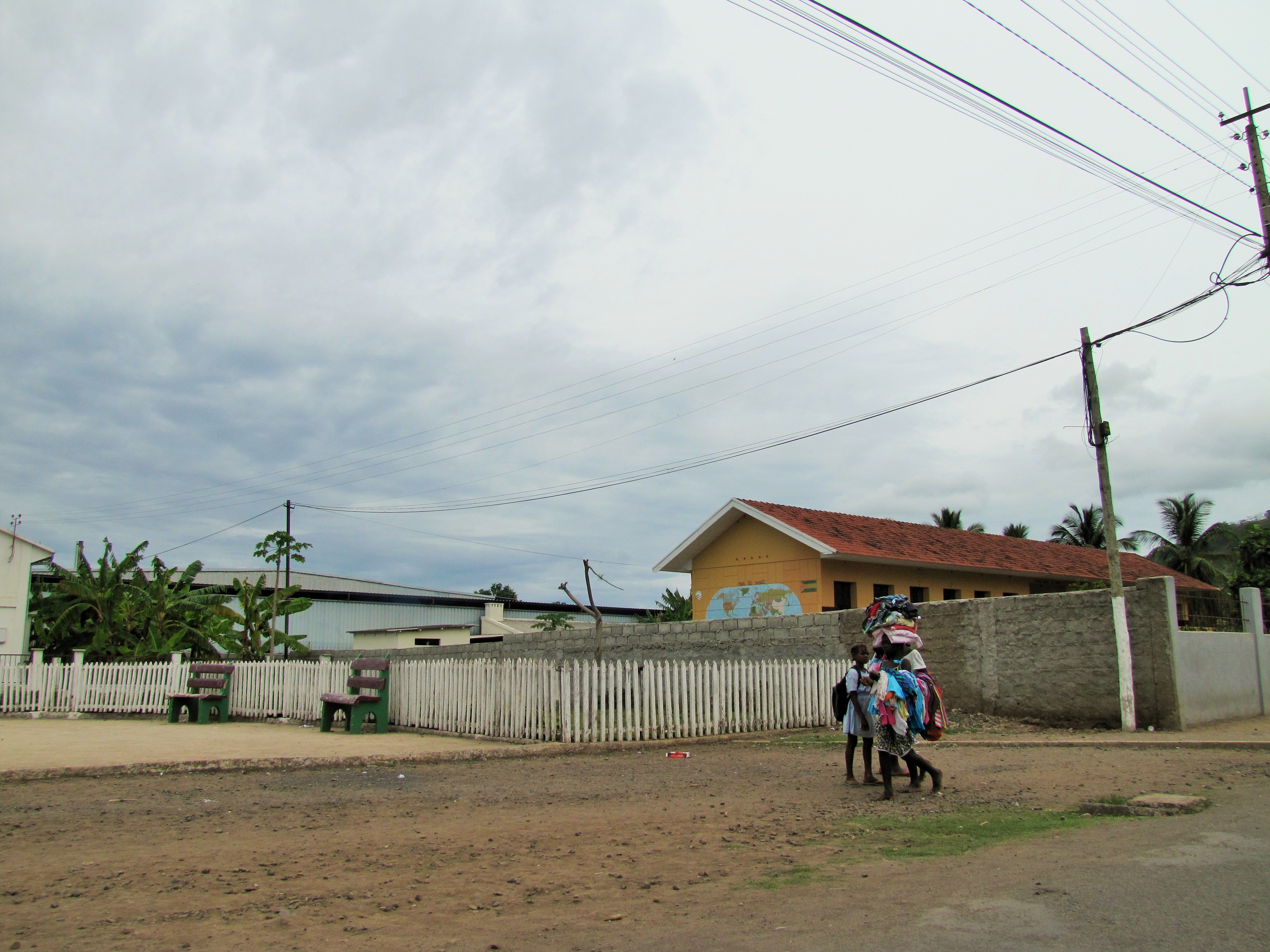
- The area of the town of Neves

- Location on São Tomé Island
- Coordinates: 0°21′33″N 6°33′06″E
- Country: São Tomé and Príncipe
- Island: São Tomé
- District: Lembá
- Elevation: 0 m (0 ft)

Population (2012)
  - Total: 10,068
- Time zone: UTC+1 (WAT)

Neves is a town on the north west coast of São Tomé Island in São Tomé and Príncipe. It is the seat of the Lembá District. Its population is 10,068 (2012).

== Geographical location ==
The main subdivisions of Neves are Benga, Rosema, Água Tomá, Bom Sucesso and Praia de Ponta Figo. It is the site of a deep-water port that was jointly constructed with Nigeria. Neves is home to some of the few industrial facilities on the island, such as a brewery and a power plant fueled by natural gas and solar energy. The plant was built by a consortium from Angola in 2014. It is capable of producing 30 megawatts of gas power and an additional 5 megawatts of solar power.

As part of a Joint Development Zone between the two countries, São Tomé and Príncipe and Nigeria agreed in 2012 to construct a fuel port in Neves. The 400 metres (1,300 ft) jetty extending off the coast is able to accommodate two Panamax-sized vessels simultaneously, which could be tied up at a depth of 20 metres (66 ft). The port was jointly organized by the two countries as part of the agreement. Funding was provided by the Nigerian government and by the Joint Development Authority Investment. Nigeria also provided the processing contract to construct the port. In return, the government of São Tomé and Príncipe provided the land used in construction and granted a tax holiday to the project's investors.

== Population history ==
Historical population
Year	Pop.	±%
2001 (census)	6,435	—
2012 (census)	10,068	+56.5%

== Sports ==
Neves is home to football club FC Neves, which plays in the São Tomé and Príncipe Championship, the top division of football in the country.

== Sister Cities ==
Porto, Portugal (1987)

== Notable people ==
Carlos Vila Nova, 5th president of Sao Tome and Principe
