= Parque Natural Obô de São Tomé =

National park in São Tomé and Príncipe

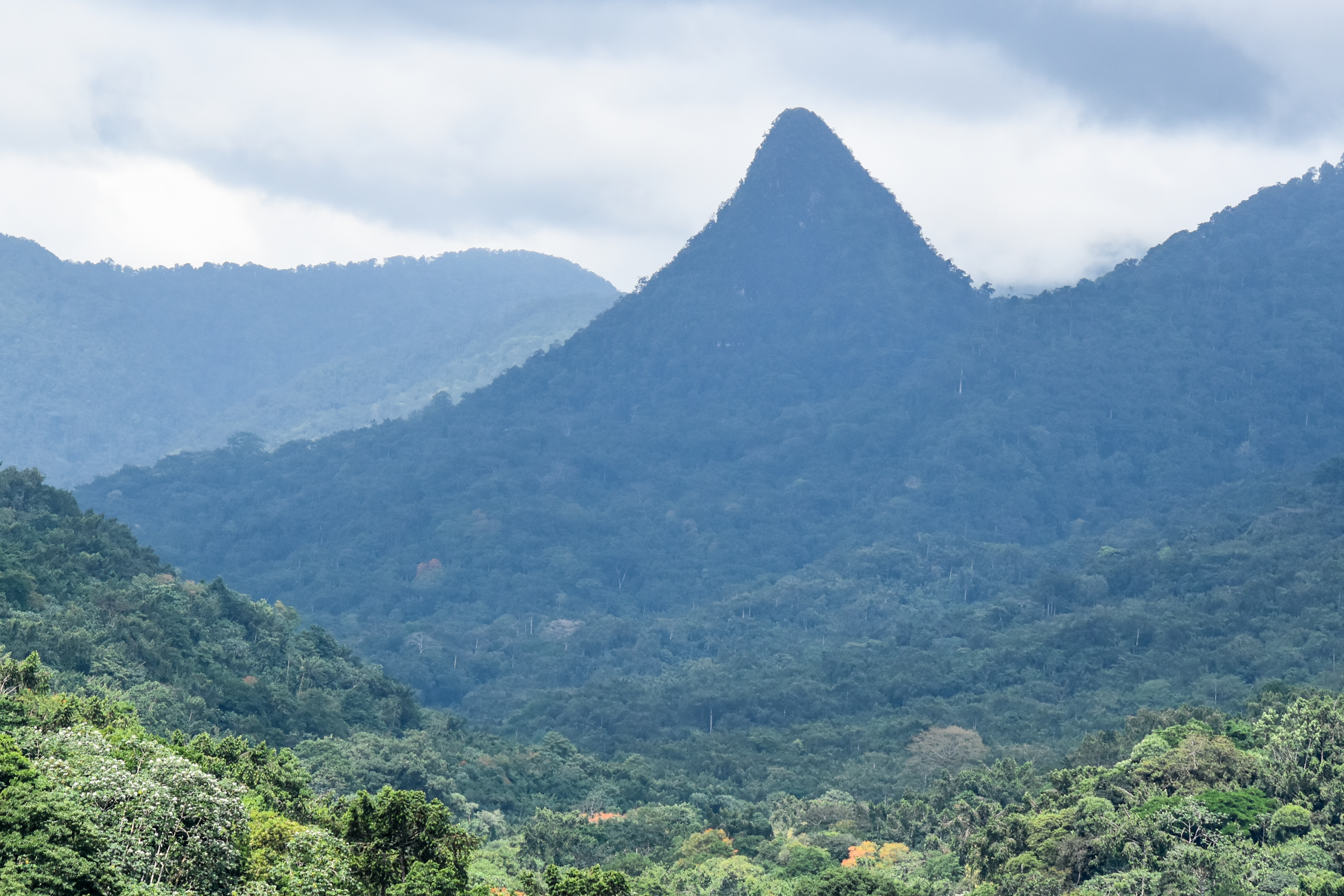
- Pico São Tomé

- Location within São Tomé and Príncipe
- Coordinates: 0°13′N 6°34′E
- Area: 195 km^{2} (75 sq mi)
- Created: 2006

The Obô Natural Park of São Tomé (Portuguese: Parque Natural Obô de São Tomé) is a natural park of São Tomé and Príncipe, covering 195 km^{2} (75 sq mi) of the island of São Tomé. It was established in 2006, but yet to be assigned an IUCN protected area category. It covers parts of the districts of Caué, Lemba, Lobata and Mé-Zóchi.

== Geography ==
The Natural Park covers three geographically separated zones:

- the largest part is the central massif, including the mountains Pico de São Tomé and Pico Cão Grande
- the zone of Malanza, in the south of the island
- the zone of Praia das Conchas and Lagoa Azul, in the north of the island

The park is known internationally amongst conservationists for its biologically rich dense virgin rainforests. It is also characterized by a wide range of biotopes, from lowland and mountain forests, to mangroves and savanna area, which contribute to its unique ecosystem. The park includes virgin Atlantic high altitude rainforest and secondary rainforest (known to locals as capoeira) which contains abandoned plantations.

In 1988, scientists classified the forests of São Tomé and Príncipe as the second most important in terms of biological interest out of 75 forests of Africa; most of the species found in the islands are found in the national park. The WWF has listed the forests of the national park as among the Global 200, the 200 most important biological areas on the planet. The forest of Obo is listed as an Important Bird Area (IBA) of Africa.

== Flora and fauna ==
There are about 700 plant species on the island of São Tomé, of which 95 are endemic. Flora includes the evergreen coniferous Afrocarpus mannii. Orchids, ferns and mosses are common in the area.

There are 16 endemic bird species on the island, including São Tomé olive pigeon (Columba thomensis), São Tomé ibis (Bostrychia bocagei), São Tomé fiscal (Lanius newtoni), São Tomé shorttail (Amaurocichlia bocagei), São Tomé grosbeak (Crithagra concolor), Giant sunbird (Dreptes thomensis), São Tomé oriole (Oriolus crassirostris) and São Tomé thrush (Turdus olivaceofuscus). The park has been recognised as an Important Bird Area (IBA) by BirdLife International.

The amphibians Ptychadena newtoni, Hyperolius thomensis, Hyperolius molleri, Phrynobatrachus leveleve, and Schistometopum thomense are found in the park. The shrew Crocidura thomensis is the only endemic terrestrial mammal. There are three endemic species of bats: São Tomé collared fruit bat (Myonycteris brachycephala), São Tomé free-tailed bat (Chaerephon tomensis), and São Tomé leaf-nosed bat (Hipposideros thomensis). Invertebrates include the moths Theretra viridis, Hyalobathra barnsalis and Pseudoclanis tomensis and the ant Tetramorium renae.

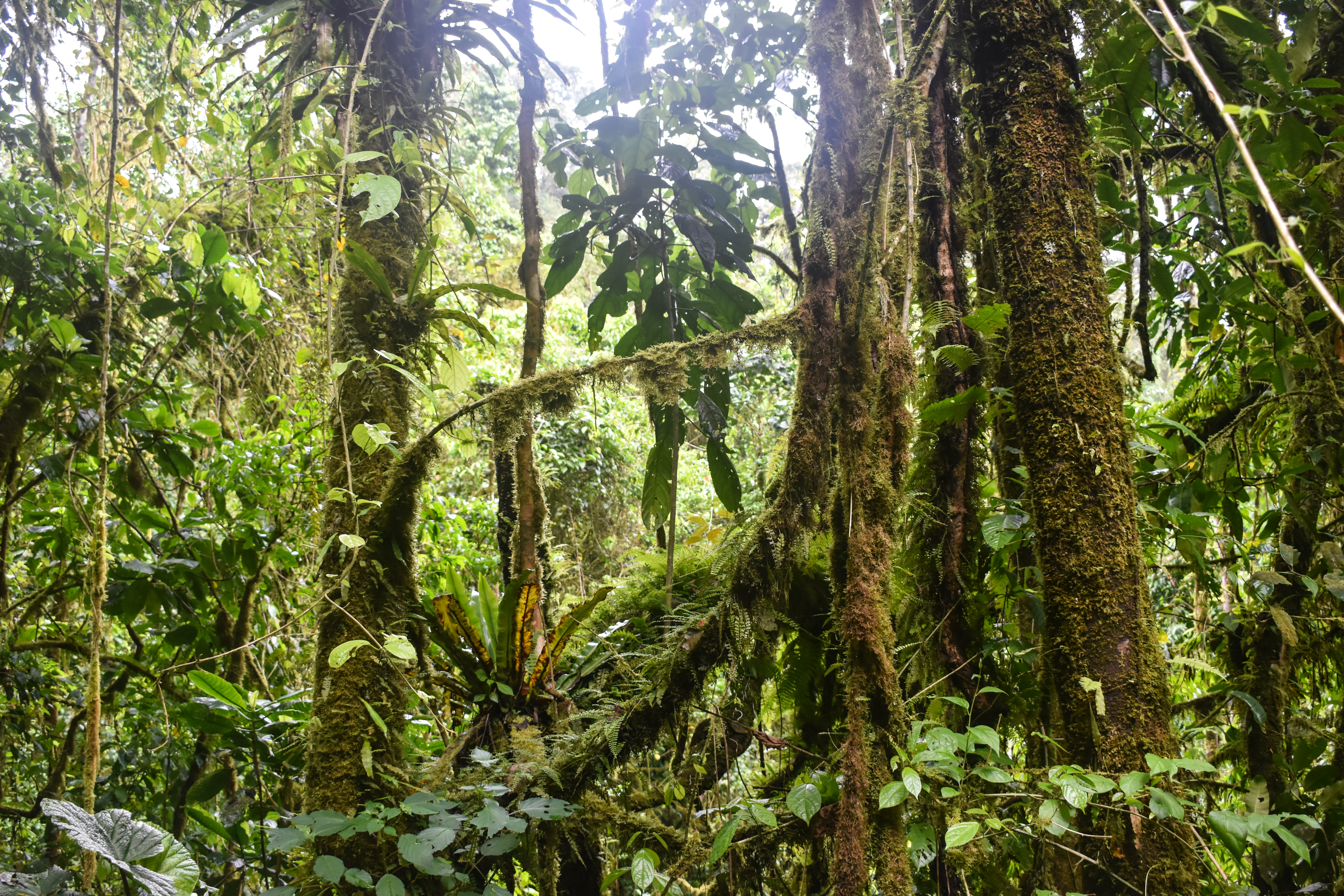
Cloud Forest of the Obo National Park.

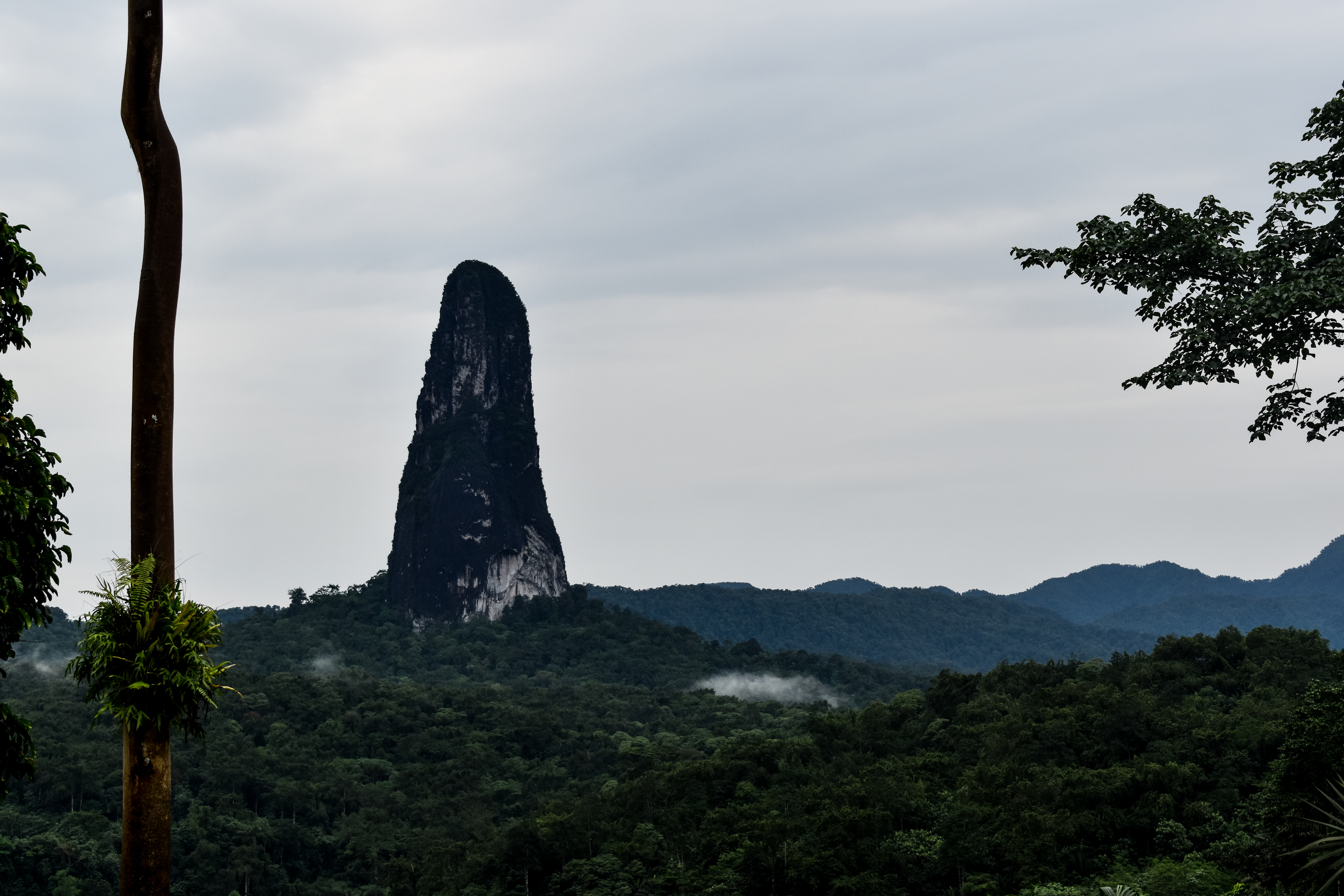
Pico Cao Grande from the south-eastern part of the park.

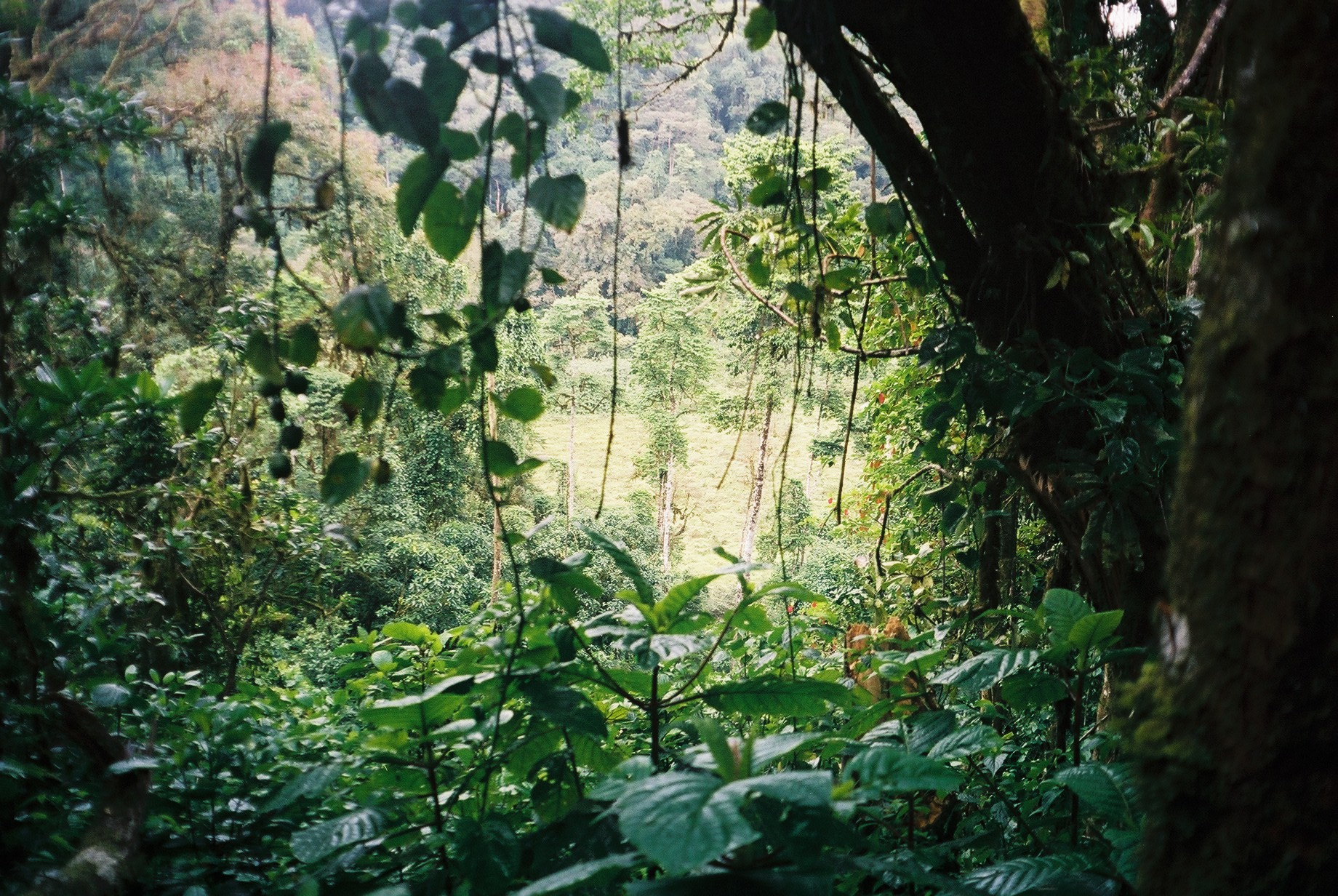
A typical forest landscape of the park area.
