= List of mammals of São Tomé and Príncipe =

This is a list of the mammal species recorded in São Tomé and Príncipe. These are the native terrestrial and naturally occurring marine mammal species in São Tomé and Príncipe, of which two are critically endangered, one is endangered, and two are near threatened. In addition, six species of terrestrial mammal have been introduced to the islands, and eight domestic species have become feral or otherwise pose a threat to the native fauna.

The following tags are used to highlight each species' conservation status as assessed by the International Union for Conservation of Nature:

| EX | Extinct | No reasonable doubt that the last individual has died. |
| EW | Extinct in the wild | Known only to survive in captivity or as a naturalized populations well outside its previous range. |
| CR | Critically endangered | The species is in imminent risk of extinction in the wild. |
| EN | Endangered | The species is facing an extremely high risk of extinction in the wild. |
| VU | Vulnerable | The species is facing a high risk of extinction in the wild. |
| NT | Near threatened | The species does not meet any of the criteria that would categorise it as risking extinction but it is likely to do so in the future. |
| LC | Least concern | There are no current identifiable risks to the species. |
| DD | Data deficient | There is inadequate information to make an assessment of the risks to this species. |

Some species were assessed using an earlier set of criteria. Species assessed using this system have the following instead of near threatened and least concern categories:

| LR/cd | Lower risk/conservation dependent | Species which were the focus of conservation programmes and may have moved into a higher risk category if that programme was discontinued. |
| LR/nt | Lower risk/near threatened | Species which are close to being classified as vulnerable but are not the subject of conservation programmes. |
| LR/lc | Lower risk/least concern | Species for which there are no identifiable risks. |

== Order: Rodentia ==
- Family: Muridae
  - Subfamily: Murinae
    - Genus: Mus
      - House mouse, Mus musculus (introduced) LR/lc
    - Genus: Rattus
      - Common rat, Rattus norvegicus (introduced) LR/lc
      - Ship rat, Rattus rattus (introduced) LR/lc

== Order: Primates ==
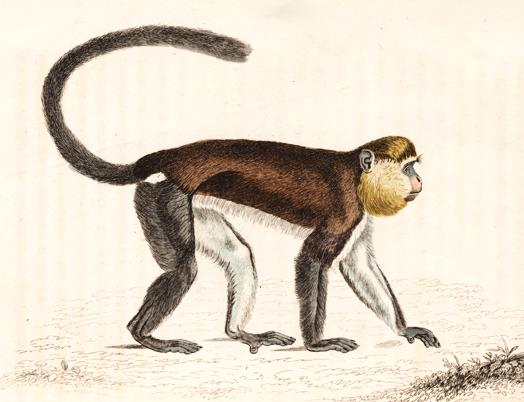
Mona monkey

The order Primates contains humans and their closest relatives: lemurs, lorisoids, tarsiers, monkeys, and apes.

- Suborder: Haplorhini
  - Infraorder: Simiiformes
    - Parvorder: Catarrhini
      - Superfamily: Cercopithecoidea
        - Family: Cercopithecidae (Old World monkeys)
            - Genus: Cercopithecus
              - Mona monkey, C. mona NT introduced

== Order: Soricomorpha (shrews, moles, and solenodons) ==
The "shrew-forms" are insectivorous mammals. The shrews and solenodons closely resemble mice, while the moles are stout-bodied burrowers.

- Family: Soricidae (shrews)
  - Subfamily: Crocidurinae
    - Genus: Crocidura
      - Fraser's musk shrew, Crocidura poensis LC
      - São Tomé shrew, Crocidura thomensis EN

== Order: Chiroptera (bats) ==
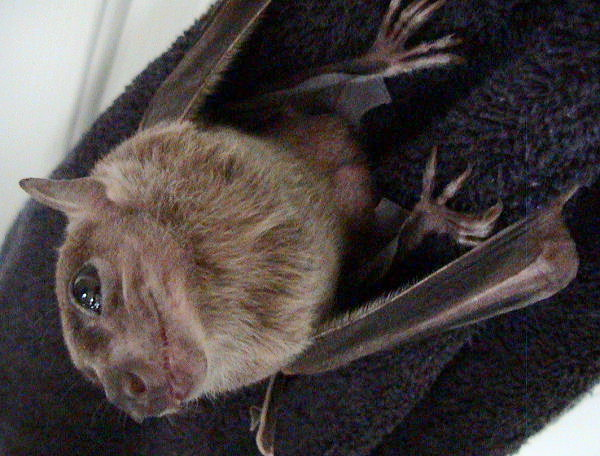
Egyptian fruit bat

The bats' most distinguishing feature is that their forelimbs are developed as wings, making them the only mammals capable of flight. Bat species account for about 20% of all mammals.

- Family: Pteropodidae (flying foxes, Old World fruit bats)
  - Subfamily: Pteropodinae
    - Genus: Eidolon
      - Straw-coloured fruit bat, Eidolon helvum LC
    - Genus: Myonycteris
      - São Tomé collared fruit bat, Myonycteris brachycephala EN
    - Genus: Rousettus
      - Egyptian fruit bat, Rousettus aegyptiacus LC
- Family: Vespertilionidae
  - Subfamily: Miniopterinae
    - Genus: Miniopterus
      - Least long-fingered bat, Miniopterus minor NT
- Family: Molossidae
  - Genus: Chaerephon
    - Little free-tailed bat, Chaerephon pumila LC
    - São Tomé free-tailed bat, Chaerephon tomensis EN
- Family: Emballonuridae
  - Genus: Taphozous
    - Mauritian tomb bat, Taphozous mauritianus LC
- Family: Rhinolophidae
  - Subfamily: Hipposiderinae
    - Genus: Hipposideros
      - Noack's roundleaf bat, Hipposideros ruber LC
      - Saõ Tomé leaf-nosed bat, Hipposideros thomensis NT

== Order: Carnivora ==
- Family: Viverridae
  - Subfamily: Viverrinae
    - Genus: Civettictis
      - African civet, Civettictis civetta (introduced) LR/lc
- Family: Mustelidae
  - Subfamily: Mustelinae
    - Genus: Mustela
      - Least weasel, Mustela nivalis (introduced) LR/lc

== Order: Cetacea (whales) ==
The order Cetacea includes whales, dolphins and porpoises. They are the mammals most fully adapted to aquatic life with a spindle-shaped nearly hairless body, protected by a thick layer of blubber, and forelimbs and tail modified to provide propulsion underwater.

- Suborder: Mysticeti
  - Family: Balaenopteridae
    - Subfamily: Balaenopterinae
      - Genus: Balaenoptera
        - Common minke whale, Balaenoptera acutorostrata LR/lc
        - Antarctic minke whale, Balaenoptera bonaerensis DD
        - Sei whale, Balaenoptera borealis EN
        - Bryde's whale, Balaenoptera edeni DD
        - Blue whale, Balaenoptera musculus EN
        - Fin whale, Balaenoptera physalus EN
    - Subfamily: Megapterinae
      - Genus: Megaptera
        - Humpback whale, Megaptera novaeangliae LR/VU
- Suborder: Odontoceti
  - Superfamily: Platanistoidea
    - Family: Physeteridae
      - Genus: Physeter
        - Sperm whale, Physeter macrocephalus LR/VU
    - Family: Kogiidae
      - Genus: Kogia
        - Pygmy sperm whale, Kogia breviceps LR/lc
        - Dwarf sperm whale, Kogia sima LR/lc
    - Family: Ziphidae
      - Subfamily: Hyperoodontinae
        - Genus: Mesoplodon
          - Blainville's beaked whale, Mesoplodon densirostris DD
          - Gervais' beaked whale, Mesoplodon europaeus DD
        - Genus: Ziphius
          - Cuvier's beaked whale, Ziphius cavirostris DD
    - Family: Delphinidae (marine dolphins)
      - Genus: Steno
        - Rough-toothed dolphin, Steno bredanensis DD
      - Genus: Tursiops
        - Common bottlenose dolphin, Tursiops truncatus LR/lc
      - Genus: Delphinus
        - Long-beaked common dolphin, Delphinus capensis DD
      - Genus: Stenella
        - Pantropical spotted dolphin, Stenella attenuata LR/cd
        - Striped dolphin, Stenella coeruleoalba LR/cd
        - Atlantic spotted dolphin, Stenella frontalis DD
        - Clymene dolphin, Stenella clymene DD
        - Spinner dolphin, Stenella longirostris LR/cd
      - Genus: Lagenodelphis
        - Fraser's dolphin, Lagenodelphis hosei DD
      - Genus: Sousa
        - Atlantic humpback dolphin, Sousa teuszii CR
      - Genus: Orcinus
        - Orca, Orcinus orca LR/cd
      - Genus: Feresa
        - Pygmy killer whale, Feresa attenuata DD
      - Genus: Pseudorca
        - False killer whale, Pseudorca crassidens LR/lc
      - Genus: Globicephala
        - Short-finned pilot whale, Globicephala macrorhynchus LR/cd
      - Genus: Peponocephala
        - Melon-headed whale, Peponocephala electra DD

== See also ==
- List of chordate orders
- Lists of mammals by region
- List of prehistoric mammals
- Mammal classification
- List of mammals described in the 2000s
