= Maianço =

- Village
- Location on São Tomé Island
- Coordinates: 0.3492°N 6.6742°E
- Country: São Tomé and Príncipe
- Island: São Tomé
- District: Lobata

Population (2012)
  - Total: 639
- Time zone: UTC+1 (WAT)

Maianço is a settlement in the southeast of Lobata District on São Tomé Island in São Tomé and Príncipe. Its population is 639 (2012 census). It lies 1.2 km east of Boa Entrada and 2.5 km southwest of Santo Amaro.

== Population history ==
Historical population
Year	Pop.	±%
2001	575	—
2008	655	+13.9%
2012	639	−2.4%
