= Climate finance in São Tomé and Príncipe =

Climate finance on the African island country of São Tomé and Príncipe

Climate finance in São Tomé and Príncipe consists of initiatives to counter the impacts of climate change that threaten the African country of São Tomé and Príncipe. As a small insular state, the archipelago is highly vulnerable to extreme events such as sea level rise, coastal erosion and heavy rain.

According to the Notre Dame Global Adaptation Index (ND‑GAIN Index), (Note: The Notre Dame Global Adaptation Index, or ND-GAIN, classifies the performance of climate adaptation of 177 countries over the last 17 years.) São Tomé and Príncipe is highly vulnerable and has low capacity of adaptation, which demonstrates the urgency of effective action. Climate finance is the term used for the financial initiatives that underpin climate change adaptions or risilience.

To reduce reliance on fossil fuels, São Tomé and Príncipe has invested on renewable energy. In 2022, the first photovoltaic power station was established in Santo Amaro. This project aims at promoting clean and sustainable energy. The Projeto de Acesso à Energia Limpa e Sustentável (Clean and Sustaniable Energy Access Project), financed by the World Bank, the African Development Bank and Japan, is also underway. This project intends to install a 10 MW photovolteic power station in São Tomé and three small stations in Príncipe, aiming at increasing access to sustainable energy and reducing fuel expenses.

Through international partnerships and investments in renewable energy, the country has sought to mitigate the effects of climate change and to ensure a safer future for its population.

== Climate context and vulnerabilities ==
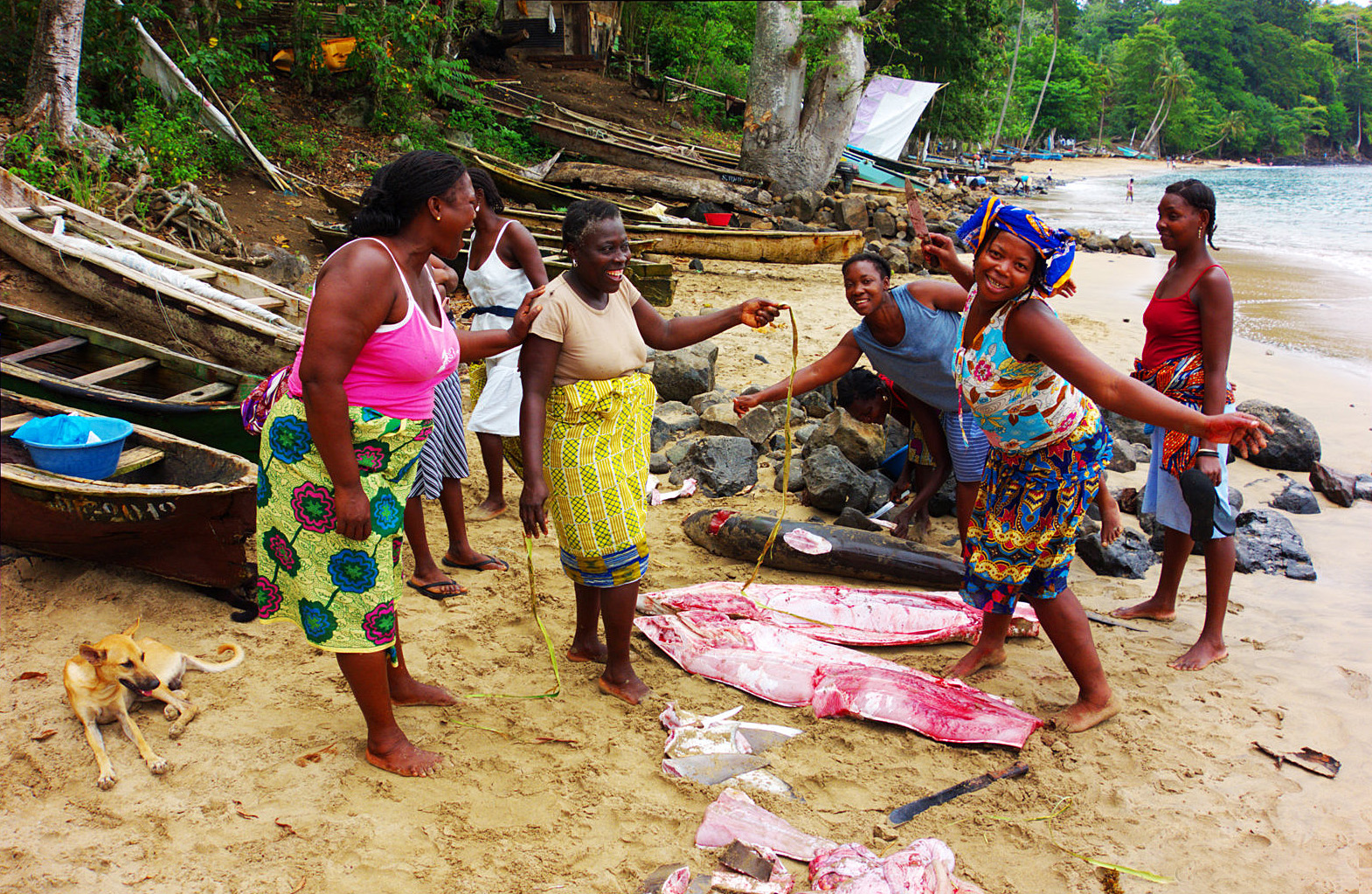
Fisherwomen in Santana.

São Tomé and Príncipe is ranked high at the ND‑GAIN Index, which indicates high vulnerability and low readiness to act. According to ND‑GAIN, the country is among the most vulnerable nations, with little infrastructural capacity to absorb and adapt to the climatic events. As a small island nation, it faces intense coastal erosion: regular storms that deteriorate beaches and coastal infrastructure, which are worsened by the sea level rise.

Besides, soil erosion and terrestrial deterioration, worsened by deforestation with commercial intentions and unsustainable agricultural practices, have caused aggradation of drainage basins and loss of soil fertility, threatening traditional agricultural subsistence. Ocean acidification, resulting from increase of dissolved CO₂, has been compromising coral reefs and reducing productivity of subsistence fishing, a crucial sector for the local economy.

Coastal communities of São Tomé and Príncipe face recurring urban and rural floods — some areas experience floods up to ten times a year — causing landslides and damaging roads, bridges and sewage systems. Ferocious droughts drastically reduce agricultural productivity, especially cocoa and banana, main export and subsistence products.

The tourism sector, developed around natural beauties and coastal ecotourism, is also vulnerable: damages to beaches, flooded trails and loss of sea sights reduce the number of visitors and revenue, affecting chains of local services.

According to data by the International Renewable Energy Agency, São Tomé and Príncipe didn't have, until the end of 2021, any installed solar power generating capacity linked to the power grid. According to the World Bank, around 76% of the country's population have access to electricity, with around 92% of the consumed electricity coming from import diesel.

== Public finance ==
The Projeto de Apoio às Fileiras Agrícolas de Exportação (Export Agriculture Support Project, PAFAE), financed by the European Union and deployed by the Marquês de Valle Flôr Institute (Note: Marquês de Valle Flôr Institute (IMVF) is a non-governmental organization for development based in Portugal that assists all CPLP countries.) in a partnership with the Ministry of Agriculture, allocated 217,678 euros to the construction of a 65 kW solar cell at the Centro de Investigação Agroeconómica e Tecnológica (Agroeconomic and Technological Investigation Center, CIAT), aiming to ensure the energetic sustainability of agronomic investigation infrastructures.

In parallel, the Projeto de Acesso a Energia Limpa e Sustentável (Clean and Sustainable Energy Access Project), budgeted at US$ 60,7 million and financed by the World Bank (US$ 47,7 million), the African Development Bank (US$ 13 million) and Japan (US$ 2,8 million), intends to install a 10 MW power cell to reinforce the national grid.

To increase resilience to flooding, the Environment and Climate Direction of the Environment Ministry prepares, with finance from the Global Encironment Facility (US$ 15 million plus a national counterpart), interventions in vulnerable urban zones, including pluvial water management systems and reinforcement of hydro infrastructure. Additionally, in 2025, the government announced plans of subventions based on municipal-level performance for green infrastructure public works, increasing local extreme event response capacities.

== Private finance ==
Climate finance coming from the private sector in Africa, including in São Tomé and Príncipe, remains below what's necessary.The African Development Bank highlights that, although there are opportunities, the involvement of the private sector is still delayed compared to public finance, and it is essential to create conditions to reduce risks and encourage private investments in green projects.

The International Conference on Innovative Environmental Finance, held in Príncipe in March 2024, stressed the necessity of attracting private investments for the conservation of biodiversity and sustainable development in São Tomé and Príncipe. The event gathered government representatives, the civil society and the private sector to discuss mechanisms of green and blue finance, aiming at the strengthening of climatic resilience in the country.

== International cooperation and external finance ==
In 2022, a 540 kWp solar generating pilot project was launched for isolated communities, budgeted at about US$ 690,000 and co-financed by the UNDP and the African Development Bank with capacity building of local technicians for operation and maintenance. The project was installed at the diesel-powered thermal station in Santo Amaro, in the district of Lobata, in the north of São Tomé Island, and concluded in August of the same year. In early June 2025, the first solar-diesel, 1,2 MW station was opened in the same station and under the same partnership; that created the first set of integrated solar stations in the archipelago, aiming at reducing the use of diesel, cut emissions and establishing a replicable model of energy transition in the region.

The country has been looking for international support to implement projects of adaptation and mitigation of climate change, recognizing its vulnerability as a small, developing island nation. During COP30), in Brazil, São Tomé and Príncipe intends to deepen international cooperation for climate finance. The minister of Economy and Finance, Gareth Guadalupe, said the country will seek international help for its projects of sustainable development during the event.

== Main beneficiary sectors ==
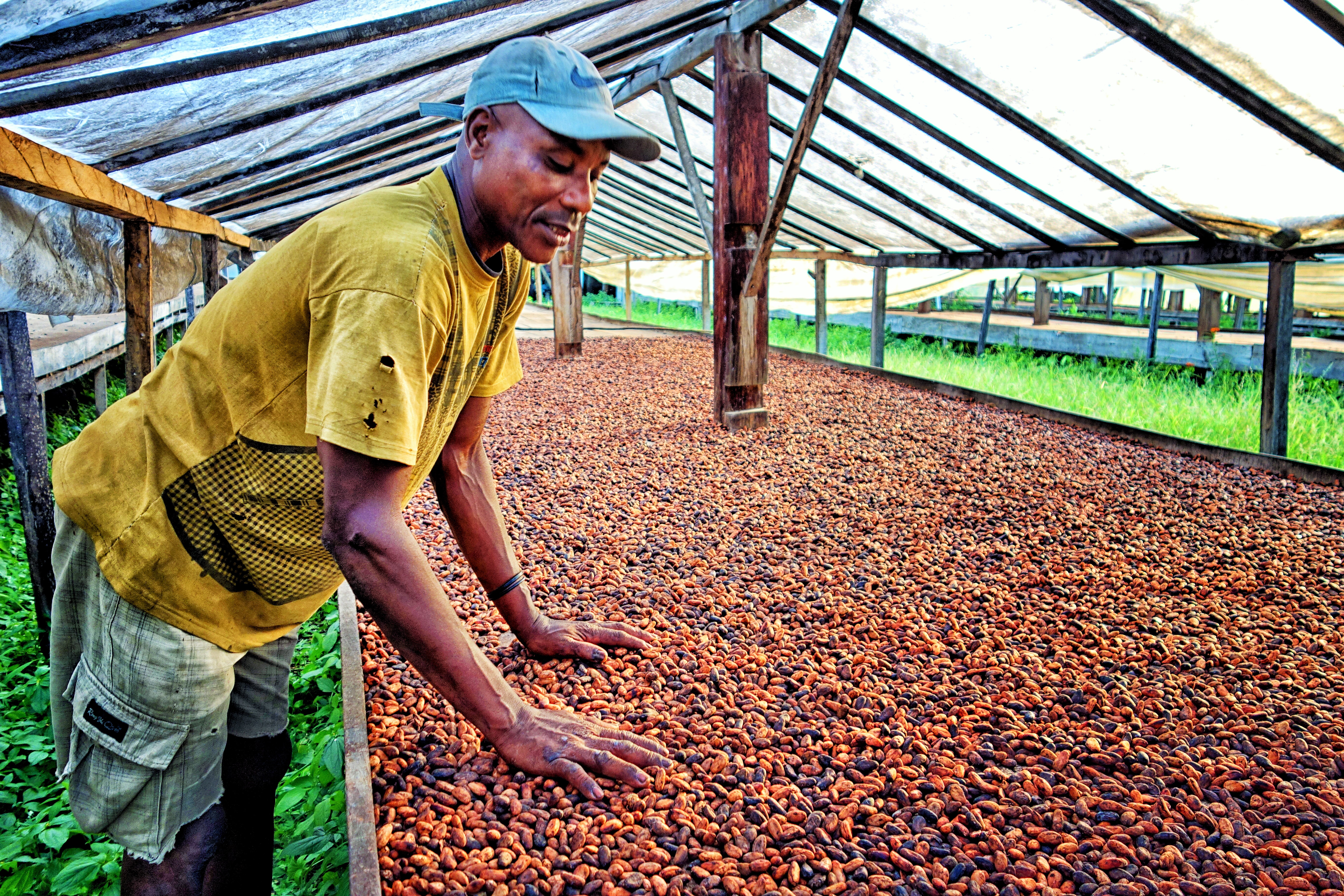
A coffee farmer in São Tomé and Príncipe.

The electric sector of São Tomé and Príncipe has been one of the main beneficiaries of climate finance, with significant investments focused on energy transition and the reduction of reliance on fossil fuels. The government promised to increase the quota of renewable energies in its energy mix, from 5% in 2022 to 50% until 2030, as outlined in the Plano de Ação Nacional das Energias Renováveis (PANER, Renewable Energy National Action Plan) and in the Plano de Ação Nacional de Eficiência Energética (PANEE, Energy Efficience National Action Plan); these involve the power stations mentioned in the section above.

Investments in the rehabilitation of hydroelectric stations are also planned, such as the one in the Papagaio River, opened in 1993 by Portuguese prime minister Aníbal Cavaco Silva, under cooperation with Portugal; however, it never went operational due to technical problems with water capture and it was soon taken over by the forest. It was reactivated in November 2008 by Portuguese construction company Soares da Costa, becoming capable of generating 80 kW, reducing the island's reliance on the diesel-thermal station from 400 kWs toa 320 kWs, with a private investment of € 150,000 provided by the company in partnership with the São Tomé Water and Electricity Company (EMAE in the Portuguese acronym).

In agriculture, programs such as the PAPAFPA have been supporting family and commercial agriculture, promoting sustainable agriculture practices adapted to the local climate conditions.

Tourism, especially ecotourism, is another beneficiary sector, with investments focused on biodiversity conservation and sustainable development. The Blue Economy Transition Strategy emphasizes the importance of sustainable touristic practices that respect the environment and the local communities.

== Impacts and results ==
Since 2013, the Solar Schools program installed systems of solar power lights in several rural schools , contributing to the improvement of learning conditions and for the development of a local market of solar services.

The implementation of projects of renewable energy, such as the 540 kWp Santo Amaro solar power plant, contributed to diversify the energy mix and reduce fossil fuel reliance

In 2025, a Agência Fiduciária de Administração de Projectos (AFAP, Project Management Trust Agency) conducted the Environmental and Social Impact Study for the projected Água Casada Solar Farm, in the district of Lobata, signalizing the continuation of the planning of large clean energy infrastructures in the country.

== Criticism and controversies ==
There are concerns about the transparency in the climate fund management in São Tomé and Príncipe.In response, the country announced the deployment of a Climate Transparency National System, with support from the UNDP and finance from the Global Environment Facility.

The geographic distribution of climate finance is also criticized; as a Small Island Developing State, São Tomé e Príncipe, receives a minimum part of the fund, despite being highly vulnerable to the impacts of climate change.

In response to the criticism, the government of São Tomé and Príncipe intends to propose at COP30 the adoption of the mechanism of debt-for-nature swap, aiming at easing the debt and increasing resources for climate action.

== Future perspectives ==
São Tomé and Príncipe has outlined strategies to strengthen climate finance, aiming at sustainable development and environmental resilience. One of the core initiatives is the Conservation Trust Fund (CTF), presented by president Carlos Vila Nova at the 2024 Summit of the Future. The CTF seeks to reposition nature as a strategic economic asset, supporting blue economy and ecotourism, with finance from investors and philanthropy, besides facilitating debt swaps for climate adaptation.

In March 2024, the country hosted the 1st International Conference on Biodiversity, with UN and African Development Bank support, aiming at attracting and improving finance for sectors linked to biodiversity. During the event, prime minister Patrice Trovoada highlighted the importance of integrated approaches that reconcile environmental objectives and economic development.

In August 2024, it was announced that São Tomé and Príncipe would be a Congo Basin Blue Fund beneficiary, with eight eligible projects focused on ecosystem and biodiversity preservation. These projects aim at supporting climate action and will be funded by partners such as the World Bank.

With progress in the energy sector, the 2020 Renewable Energy and Energy Efficiency Plan set a goal to raise to 50% the participation of renewable sources in the energy mix until 2030, supported by feasibility studies conducted by the Associação Lusófona de Energias Renováveis (ALER, Lusophone Association of Renewable Energies) and by the Ministry of Public Works.
