= Boa Esperança, São Tomé and Príncipe =

Boa Esperança
- Village
- Location on São Tomé Island
- Coordinates: 0.3308°N 6.6252°E
- Country: São Tomé and Príncipe
- Island: São Tomé
- District: Lobata

Population (2012)
  - Total: 97
- Time zone: UTC+1 (WAT)

Boa Esperança is a settlement in the southwestern part of the Lobata District on São Tomé Island in São Tomé and Príncipe. Its population is 97 (2012 census). It lies 4 km northwest of Monte Café, 5 km southwest of Agostinho Neto and 9 km east of Neves.

== Population history ==
Historical population
Year	Pop.	±%
2001	72	—
2008	82	+13.9%
2012	97	+18.3%
