= Lagoa Azul Lighthouse =

Lagoa Azul Lighthouse Farol da Lagoa Azul
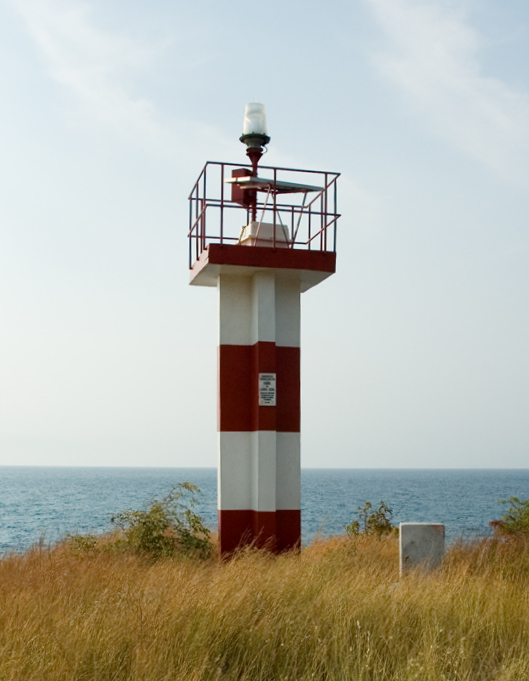
- Location: Lagoa Azul, Lobata District, São Tomé and Príncipe
- Coordinates: 0°24′26″N 6°36′37″E

Tower
- Constructed: 12 September 1997
- Height: 5 m (16 ft)
- Shape: quadrilateral
- Heritage: Heritage of Portuguese Influence

Light
- Focal height: 34 m (112 ft)
- Range: 12 nmi (22 km; 14 mi)
- Characteristic: Fl(2) 15s

Lagoa Azul Lighthouse (Portuguese: Farol da Lagoa Azul) is a lighthouse located on the headland of Lagoa Azul in the district of Lobata, northern São Tomé Island, São Tomé and Príncipe. It is 4.5 km northwest of Guadalupe and 15 km northwest of the city of São Tomé. The lighthouse was built in 1997. It is a 5 m high white tower with red bands, and its focal height is 34 m.

== See also ==
- List of lighthouses in São Tomé and Príncipe
