= Boa Entrada, São Tomé and Príncipe =

Boa Entrada
- Village
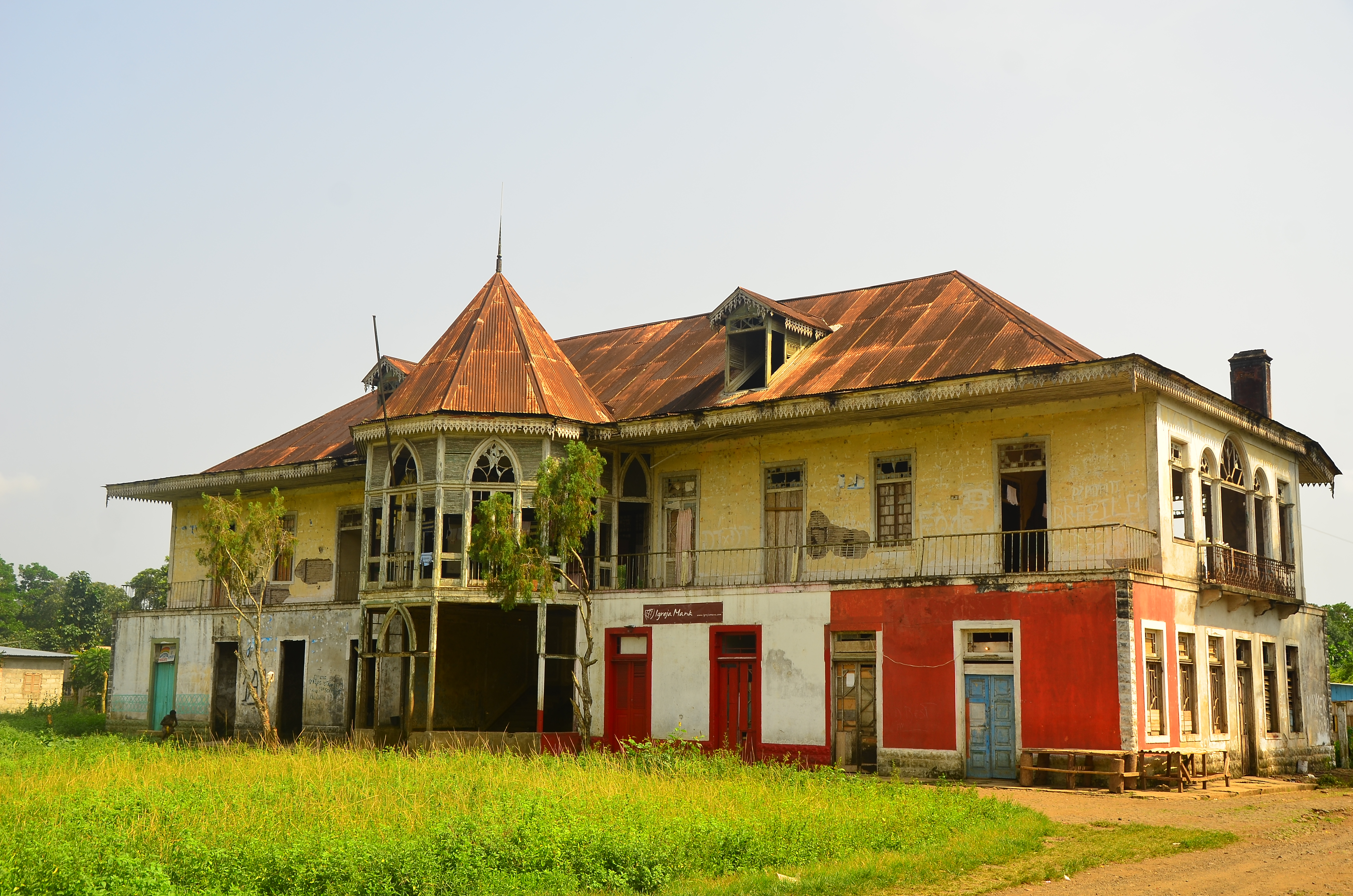
- Roça Boa Entrada

- Location on São Tomé Island
- Coordinates: 0.3519°N 6.6434°E
- Country: São Tomé and Príncipe
- Island: São Tomé
- District: Lobata

Population (2012)
  - Total: 738
- Time zone: UTC+1 (WAT)

Boa Entrada is a settlement in Lobata District on São Tomé Island in São Tomé and Príncipe. Its population is 700 (2012 census). It lies 3 km south of Conde, 3 km southeast of Agostinho Neto and 8 km west of the capital São Tomé. Boa Entrada grew around the plantation complex Roça Boa Entrada, established in 1870. Cocoa, bananas, breadfruit and copra were cultivated here.

== Population history ==
Historical population
Year	Pop.	±%
2001	614	—
2008	700	+14.0%
2012	738	+5.4%
