= Lobata District =

District of São Tomé and Príncipe

Lobata
- District
- Location within São Tomé and Príncipe
- Coordinates: 0°22′N 6°40′E
- Country: São Tomé and Príncipe
- Island: São Tomé
- Seat: Guadalupe

Area
  - Total: 105 km^{2} (41 sq mi)

Population (2012)
  - Total: 19,365
  - Density: 184/km^{2} (478/sq mi)
- Time zone: UTC+0 (UTC)

Lobata is a district of São Tomé and Príncipe, on São Tomé Island. Its area is 105 km^{2} (41 sq mi), and its population is 19,365 (2012). The district seat is Guadalupe. It is divided into the four statistical subdistricts Guadalupe, Santo Amaro, Conde and Micoló.

== Geography ==
The district includes an islet called the Ilhéu das Cabras. Numerous beaches dot the coast, including Praia de Lagoa Azul, das Conchas, Guegue Micoló, das Plancas and dos Tamarindos. The eastern part of the district is increasingly urbanised due to its proximity to the city São Tomé.

== Population ==
Population of Lobata District (1940—2012)
Year	Population
1940	9,194
1950	8,181
1960	7,905
1970	9,372
1981	11,731
1991	14,173
2001	15,187
2012	19,365

== Settlements ==
The main settlement is the town Guadalupe. Other settlements are:

- Agostinho Neto
- Bela Vista
- Boa Entrada
- Boa Esperança
- Conde
- Fernão Dias
- Maianço
- Micoló
- Praia das Conchas
- Santo Amaro

== Landmarks and points of interest ==
- Lagoa Azul, a bay in the west of the district.
- Lagoa Azul Lighthouse - west of Morro Peixe
- Roça Boa Entrada
- Roça do Rio Ouro in Agostinho Neto

== Politics ==
Lobata currently has six seats in the National Assembly.

== Notable people ==
- William Barbosa, footballer
- Olinda Beja, writer
- Aurélio Martins, journalist, businessman and politician
- Ludgério Silva, footballer

== Twin towns ==
- Seixal, Portugal
- Sousel, Portugal
- Vila Nova de Famalicão, Portugal
