= Sierra Leone collared fruit bat =

Conservation status
- Least Concern (IUCN 3.1)

Scientific classification
- Kingdom: Animalia
- Phylum: Chordata
- Class: Mammalia
- Order: Chiroptera
- Family: Pteropodidae
- Genus: Myonycteris
- Species: M. leptodon

Binomial name
- Myonycteris leptodon Andersen, 1908

Species of bat

Sierra Leone collared fruit bat (Myonycteris leptodon) is a species of megabat found in West Africa.

== Taxonomy ==
The Sierra Leone collared fruit bat was described as a new species in 1908 by Danish mammalogist Knud Andersen. The holotype had been collected by J. Hickman in Sierra Leone. It was considered a subspecies of the little collared fruit bat (Myonycteris torquatus) beginning in 1976; a 2013 study determined that the taxon was indeed genetically distinct enough to be considered a full species.

== Description ==
The Sierra Leone collared fruit bat males weigh an average of 39.9 g (1.41 oz), while females weigh an average of 42.0 g (1.48 oz). Male forearm lengths are about 61.2 g (2.16 oz) compared to females at 61.5 mm (2.42 in). For both sexes, the average head and body length is 107.9 mm (4.25 in).

== Biology and ecology ==
Along with the straw-colored fruit bat and Veldkamp's dwarf epauletted fruit bat, the Sierra Leone collared fruit bat is one of the only African megabats believed to have seasonal migration. It roosts singly or in small groups during the day.

== Range and habitat ==
The Sierra Leone collared fruit bat is found throughout West Africa, including: Ivory Coast, Ghana, Guinea, Liberia, Sierra Leone, and Togo. It is often found in lowland tropical forests, though has also been documented in habitats that are a mix of forest and grassland.
