= Lagoa Azul =

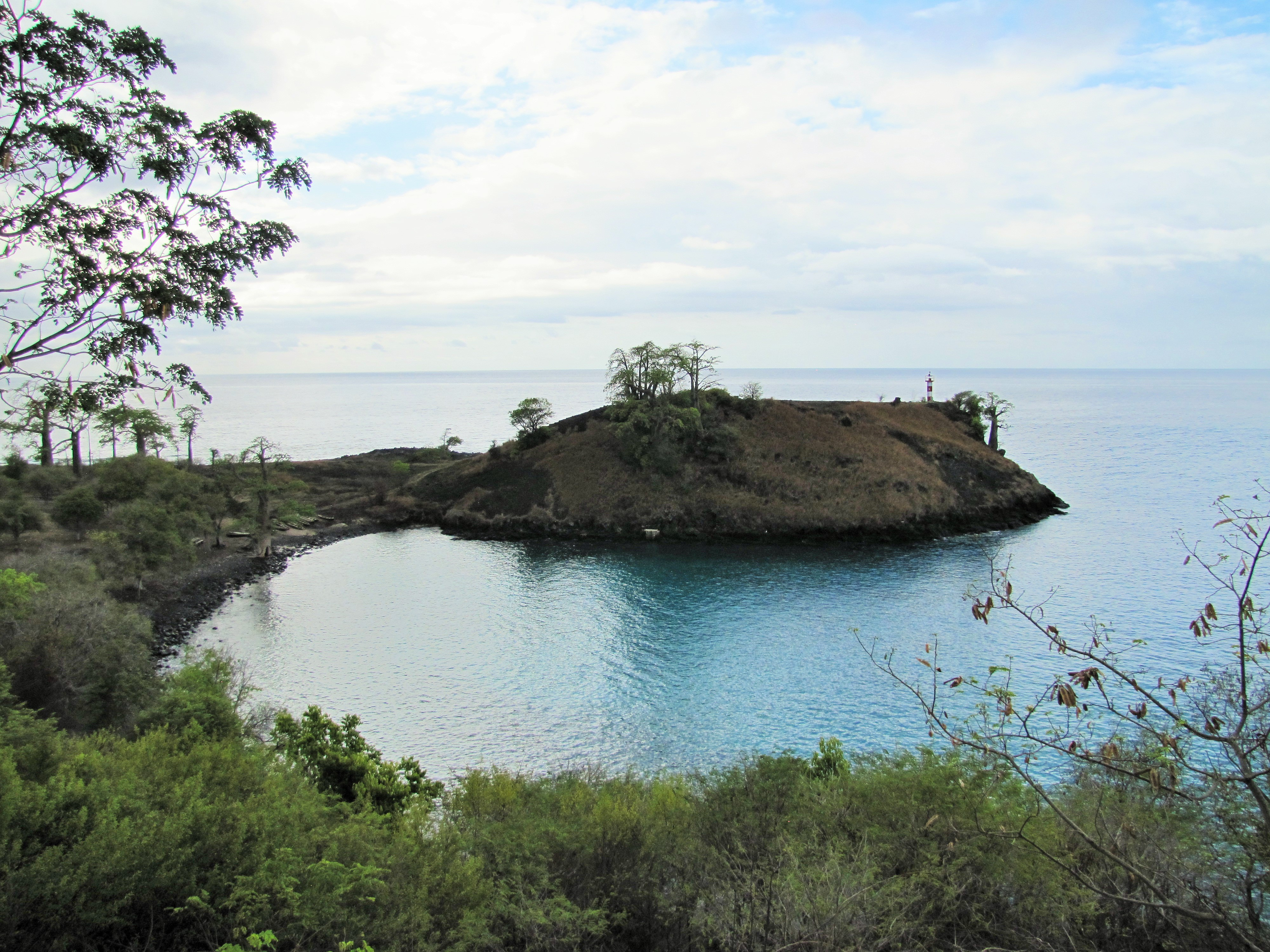

- Lagoa Azul at the north of São Tomé Island
- Location: Northwestern Lobata District, São Tomé, São Tomé and Príncipe
- Coordinates: 0.4063°N 6.6103°E
- Type: bay

Lagoa Azul (Portuguese for "blue lagoon") is a small bay in the northern part of the island of São Tomé in São Tomé and Príncipe. It is part of the Parque Natural Obô de São Tomé. It is 4 km northwest of the town Guadalupe. It is a popular spot for diving. There is a lighthouse near the bay, built in 1997.

== See also ==
- Geography of São Tomé and Príncipe
