= William Barbosa =

William Barbosa' may refer to:

- William Barbosa (footballer, born 1978), Brazilian football midfielder
- William Barbosa (footballer, born 1983), Santomean football centre-back

== See also ==
- Willyan da Silva Barbosa (born 1994) Brazilian footballer
- Willian Xavier Barbosa (born 1983) Brazilian footballer
