= Micoló =

- Town
- Location on São Tomé Island
- Coordinates: 0°24′0″N 6°41′20″E
- Country: São Tomé and Príncipe
- Island: São Tomé
- District: Lobata

Population (2012)
  - Total: 1,404
- Time zone: UTC+1 (WAT)

Micoló is a seaside town in Lobata District in the northern part of São Tomé Island in São Tomé and Príncipe. Its population is 1404 (2012 census). It is situated near the mouth of the river Rio do Ouro. The islet Ilhéu das Cabras lies about 2.5 kilometres (1.6 mi) to the east. Micoló lies 4 kilometres (2.5 mi) northeast of Conde and 9 kilometres (5.6 mi) northwest of the city centre of the capital São Tomé.

== Population history ==
Historical population
Year	Pop.	±%
2001	884	—
2008	1,008	+14.0%
2012	1,404	+39.3%

== Sports ==
- Desportivo Marítimo - a football (soccer) club currently playing in the regional second division.
