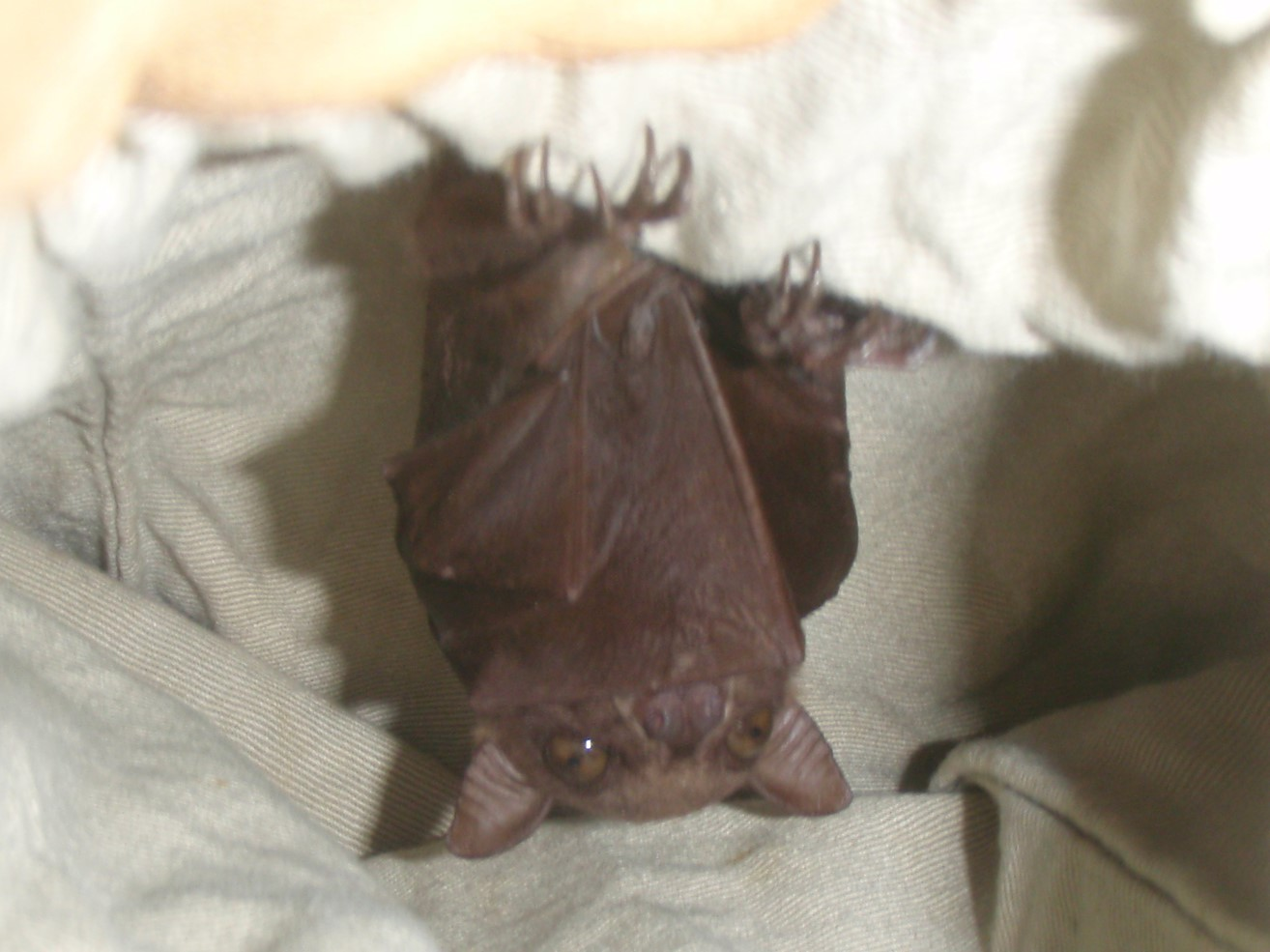

Conservation status
- Least Concern (IUCN 3.1)

Scientific classification
- Kingdom: Animalia
- Phylum: Chordata
- Class: Mammalia
- Order: Chiroptera
- Family: Pteropodidae
- Genus: Myonycteris
- Species: M. relicta

Binomial name
- Myonycteris relicta Bergmans, 1980
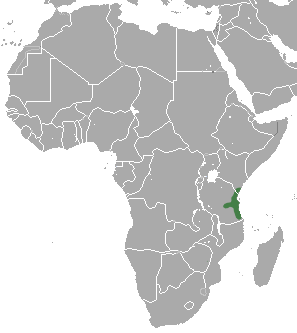
- East African little collared fruit bat range

= East African little collared fruit bat =

Species of bat

The East African little collared fruit bat (Myonycteris relicta) is a species of megabat in the family Pteropodidae. It is found in Kenya, Tanzania, and Zimbabwe. Its natural habitats are subtropical or tropical dry forests and moist savanna.
