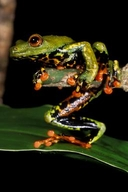

Conservation status
- Endangered (IUCN 3.1)

Scientific classification
- Kingdom: Animalia
- Phylum: Chordata
- Class: Amphibia
- Order: Anura
- Family: Hyperoliidae
- Genus: Hyperolius
- Species: H. thomensis

Binomial name
- Hyperolius thomensis Bocage, 1886
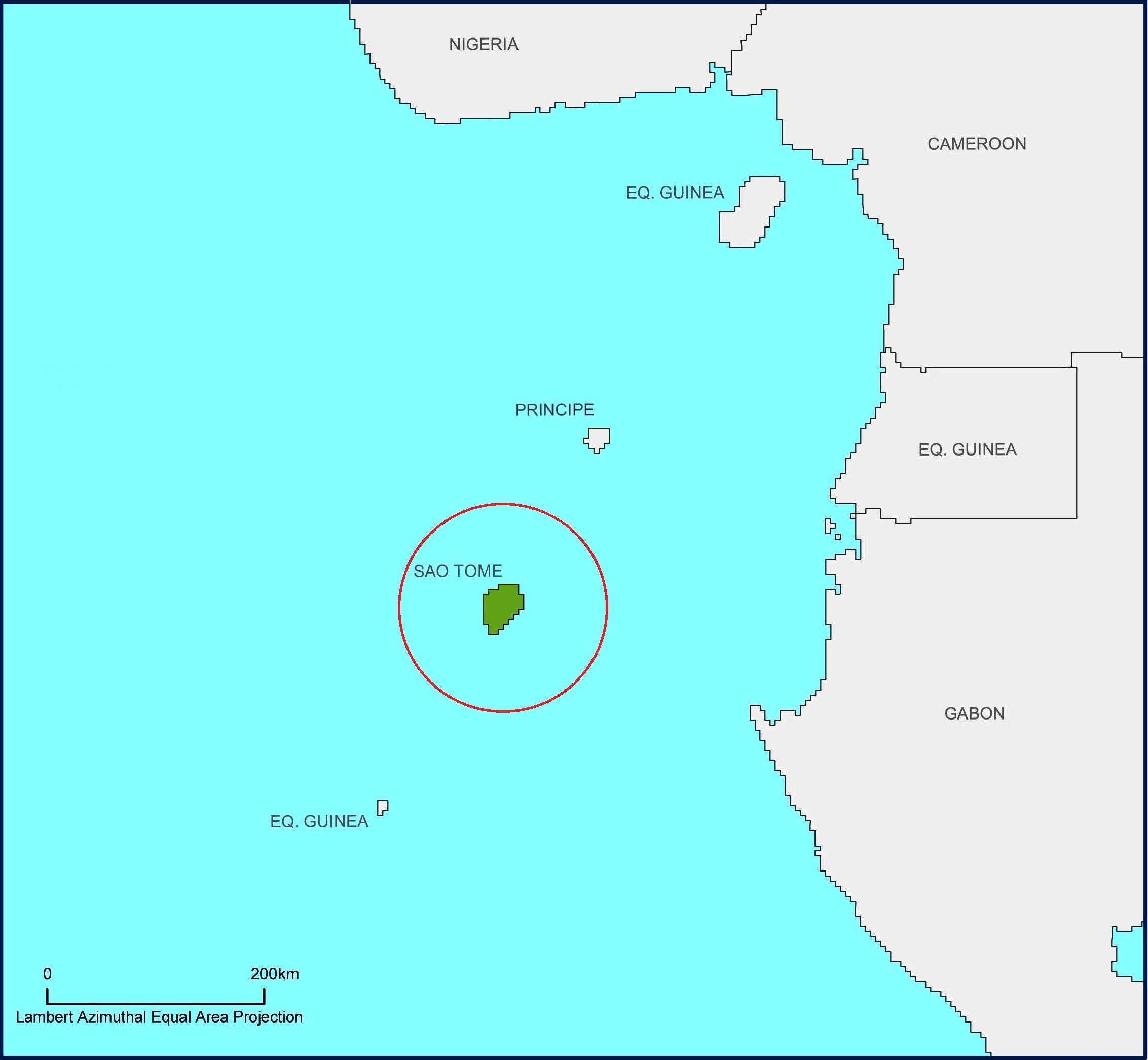
- range

Synonyms
- Rappia thomensis (Bocage, 1886); Nesionixalus thomensis (Bocage, 1886)

= Hyperolius thomensis =

Species of frog

Hyperolius thomensis is a species of frog in the family Hyperoliidae. It is endemic to the island of São Tomé in São Tomé and Príncipe. Common names São Tomé reed frog, São Tomé giant reed frog, and Sao Tome giant treefrog have been coined for it. It is the largest Hyperolius species.

== Taxonomy and systematics ==
The species was named by José Vicente Barbosa du Bocage in 1886. It is the type species of the genus Nesionixalus Perret, 1976. Its sister taxon Hyperolius molleri has also been placed in Nesionixalus. Together, these two species form a clade, but its recognition as a genus would render rest of Hyperolius paraphyletic. The two species can form hybrids.

== Description ==
Adult males measure 27–41 mm (1.1–1.6 in) and adult females 36–49 mm (1.4–1.9 in) in snout–vent length. The dorsum is uniform brown or green to blue-green. The venter is marbled in white, orange and black. The ventral surfaces of the limbs are richly marbled in orange and black. Males have their dorsum densely beset with small spines. The pupil is horizontal.

== Habitat and conservation ==
Hyperolius thomensis inhabits primary rainforest remnants usually at altitudes above 800 metres (2,600 ft), but occasionally as low as 350 metres (1,150 ft). Breeding takes place in tree holes where their tadpoles develop, and the same hole can be utilized by many individuals.

The threats to this species are poorly known, but it is probably impacted by habitat loss caused by agriculture, livestock, wood extraction, and human settlements. Its range includes the Parque Natural Obô de São Tomé.

== Threats ==
=== Habitat Loss ===
Habitat loss, primarily driven by the conversion of land for agriculture and livestock, poses a significant threat to the São Tomé Giant Reed Frog. Additionally, the species faces challenges from habitat reduction due to activities such as wood extraction and the expansion of human settlements.

=== Amphibian Chytrid Fungus (Bd) Infection ===
A survey conducted for the presence of the amphibian chytrid fungus (Bd) revealed infections dating back to 2001. Despite the identification of the fungus, no instances of sick or deceased frogs have been reported in the field. However, the highly virulent strain of the pathogen (Bd-GPL) present on São Tomé Island raises concerns about its potential threat to the species.
