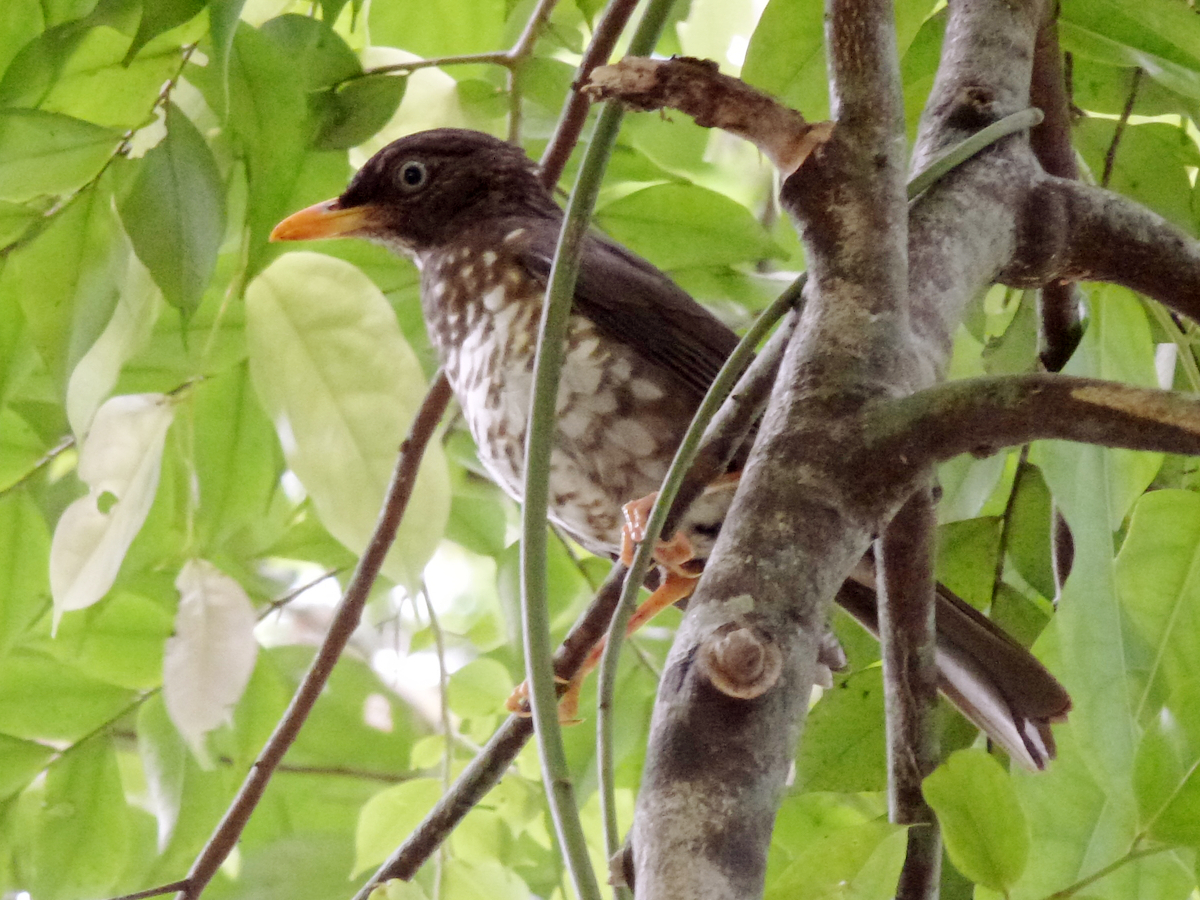

Conservation status
- Critically Endangered (IUCN 3.1)

Scientific classification
- Kingdom: Animalia
- Phylum: Chordata
- Class: Aves
- Order: Passeriformes
- Family: Turdidae
- Genus: Turdus
- Species: T. xanthorhynchus

Binomial name
- Turdus xanthorhynchus Salvadori, 1901
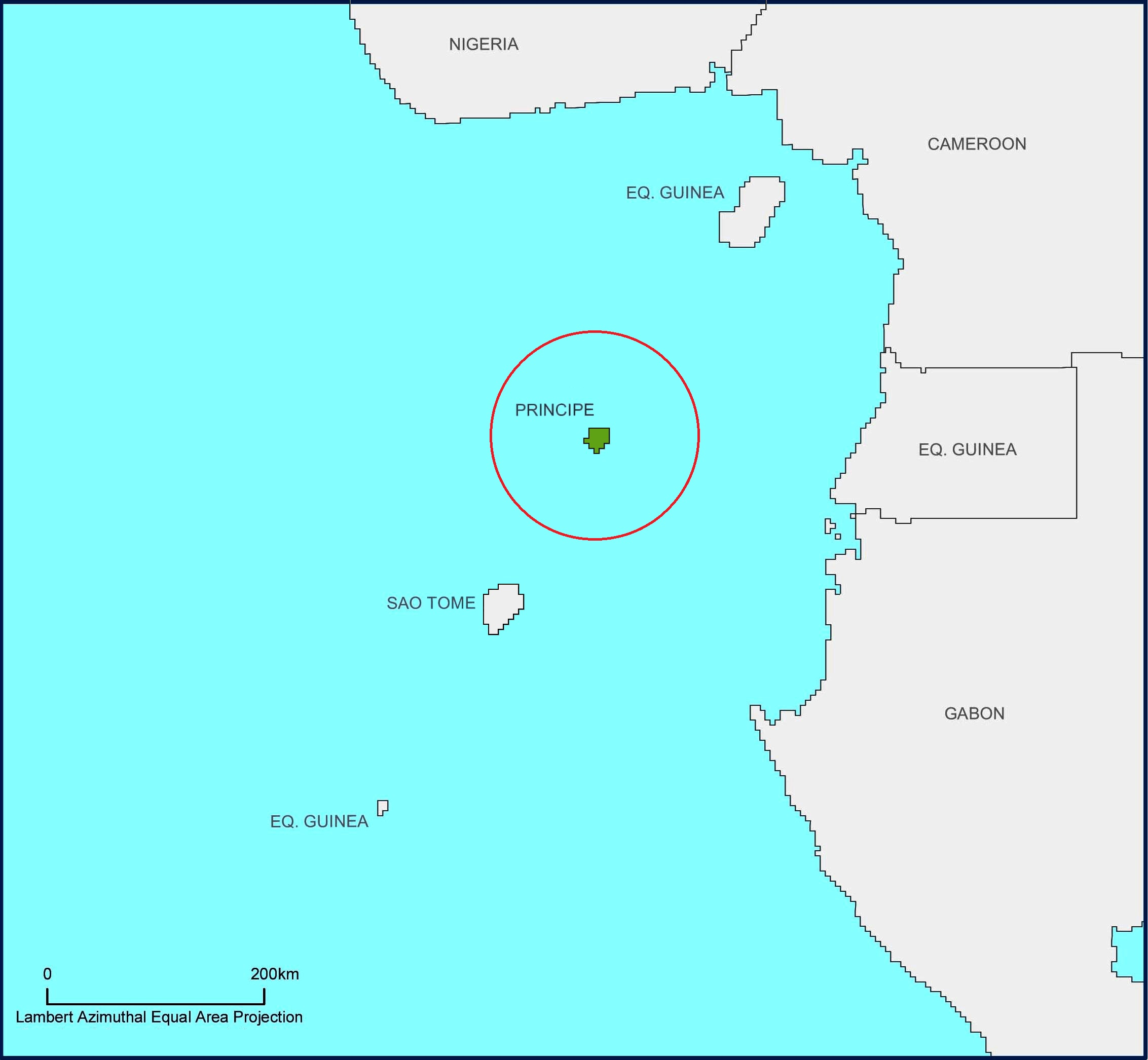
- range

Synonyms
- Turdus olivaceofuscus xanthorhynchus

= Príncipe thrush =

Species of bird

The Príncipe thrush (Turdus xanthorhynchus) is a species of bird in the family Turdidae. It is endemic to Príncipe. It was formerly considered a subspecies of the São Tomé thrush, with some taxonomists still considering it so.

Its natural habitats are subtropical or tropical moist lowland forests and subtropical or tropical moist montane forests. It is critically endangered. Although some attribute this to habitat loss, the latest evidence from knowledgeable local guides suggests that the threat is from nest predation by the rapidly increasing population of invasive monkeys, which have been caught on camera traps stealing eggs.
