= Bela Vista, São Tomé and Príncipe =

Bela Vista
- Village
- Location on São Tomé Island
- Coordinates: 0°21′30″N 6°41′20″E
- Country: São Tomé and Príncipe
- Island: São Tomé
- District: Lobata

Population (2012)
  - Total: 517
- Time zone: UTC+1 (WAT)

Bela Vista (Portuguese for "Beautiful View") is a village in Lobata District on São Tomé Island in São Tomé and Príncipe. Its population is 527 (2012 census). It lies 0.8 km south of Santo Amaro and 5 km northwest of the capital city São Tomé.

== Population history ==
Historical population
Year	Pop.	±%
2001	499	—
2008	569	+14.0%
2012	517	−9.1%
