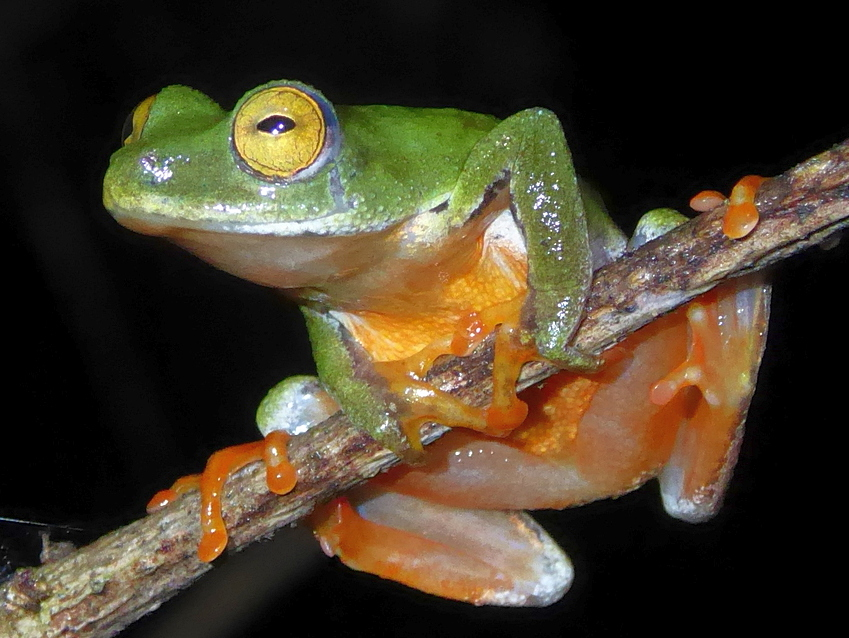

Conservation status
- Least Concern (IUCN 3.1)

Scientific classification
- Kingdom: Animalia
- Phylum: Chordata
- Class: Amphibia
- Order: Anura
- Family: Hyperoliidae
- Genus: Hyperolius
- Species: H. molleri

Binomial name
- Hyperolius molleri (Bedriaga, 1892)
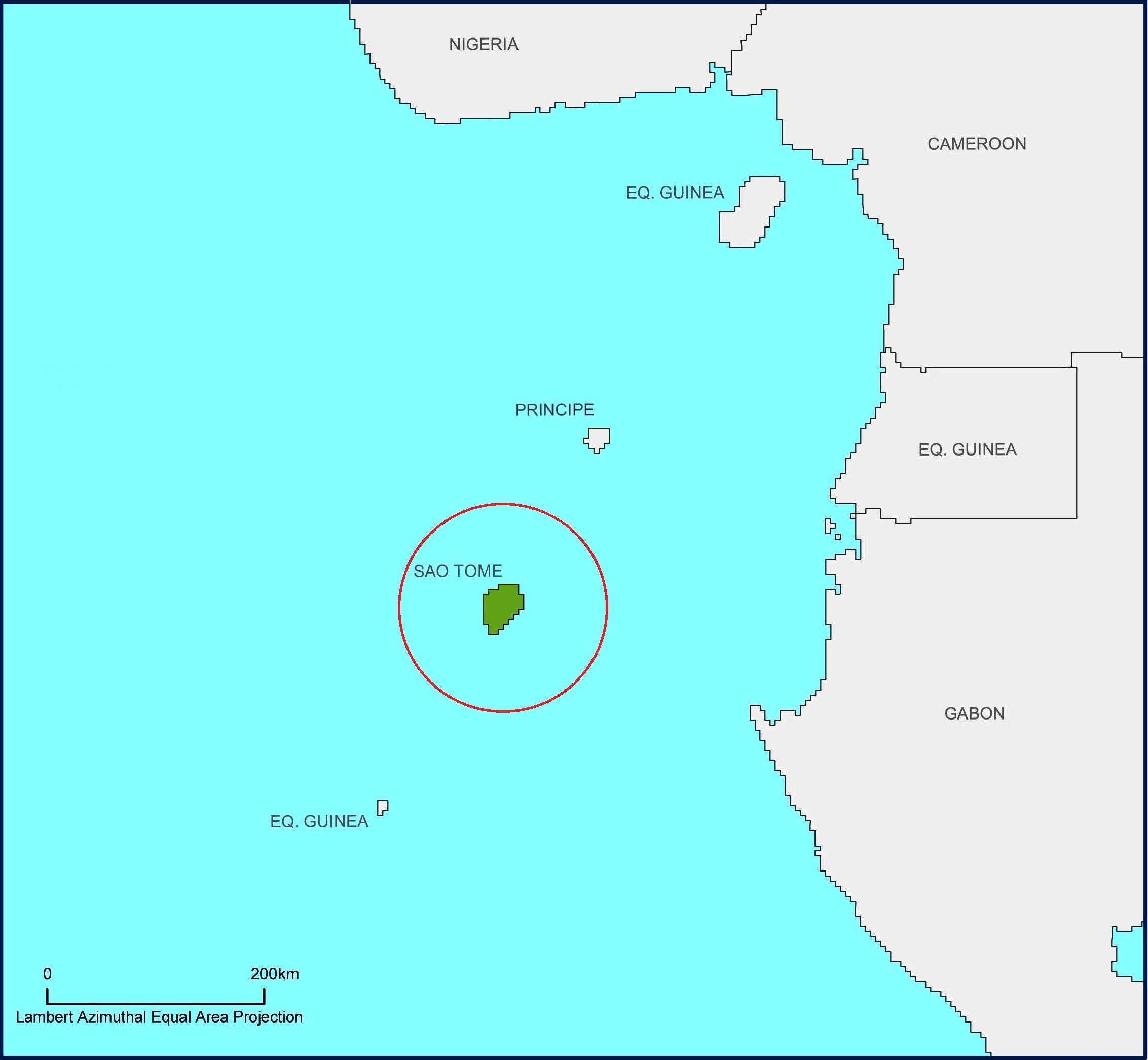
- range

Synonyms
- Rappia molleri Bedriaga, 1892; Nesionixalus molleri (Bedriaga, 1892)

= Hyperolius molleri =

Species of frog

Hyperolius molleri is a species of frog in the family Hyperoliidae. It is endemic to São Tomé Island. Records from Príncipe now refer to Hyperolius drewesi, described as a distinct species in 2016.

== Taxonomy and systematics ==
The species was described by Jacques von Bedriaga in 1892 and was named after Adolphe F. Moller (1842–1920), a Portuguese botanist who collected in São Tomé. It belongs to the so-called Hyperolius cinnamomeoventris species complex. It can form hybrids with Hyperolius thomensis.

== Description ==
Adult males measure 24–31 mm (0.94–1.22 in) and adult females 31–33 mm (1.2–1.3 in) in snout–vent length. The dorsum is bright green or brown and hasfine spinosities. Juveniles have light dorsolateral lines. The ventrum is uniform white or red. The ventral sides of the legs are white to red. The pupil is horizontal.

== Habitat and conservation ==
Hyperolius molleri occurs in primary forest, farm bush, coconut groves, coffee plantations, and disturbed areas from near sea level to 1,420 m (4,660 ft) above sea level. The eggs are laid on leaf surfaces over still or very slow-moving water. The tadpoles develop in the water.

Hyperolius molleri is common. It is not known to face significant threats, given its adaptability to habitat modification. It occurs in the Parque Natural Obô de São Tomé.
