= São Tomé free-tailed bat =

Conservation status
- Endangered (IUCN 3.1)

Scientific classification
- Kingdom: Animalia
- Phylum: Chordata
- Class: Mammalia
- Order: Chiroptera
- Family: Molossidae
- Genus: Mops
- Species: M. tomensis

Binomial name
- Mops tomensis (J. Juste & C. Ibañez, 1993)
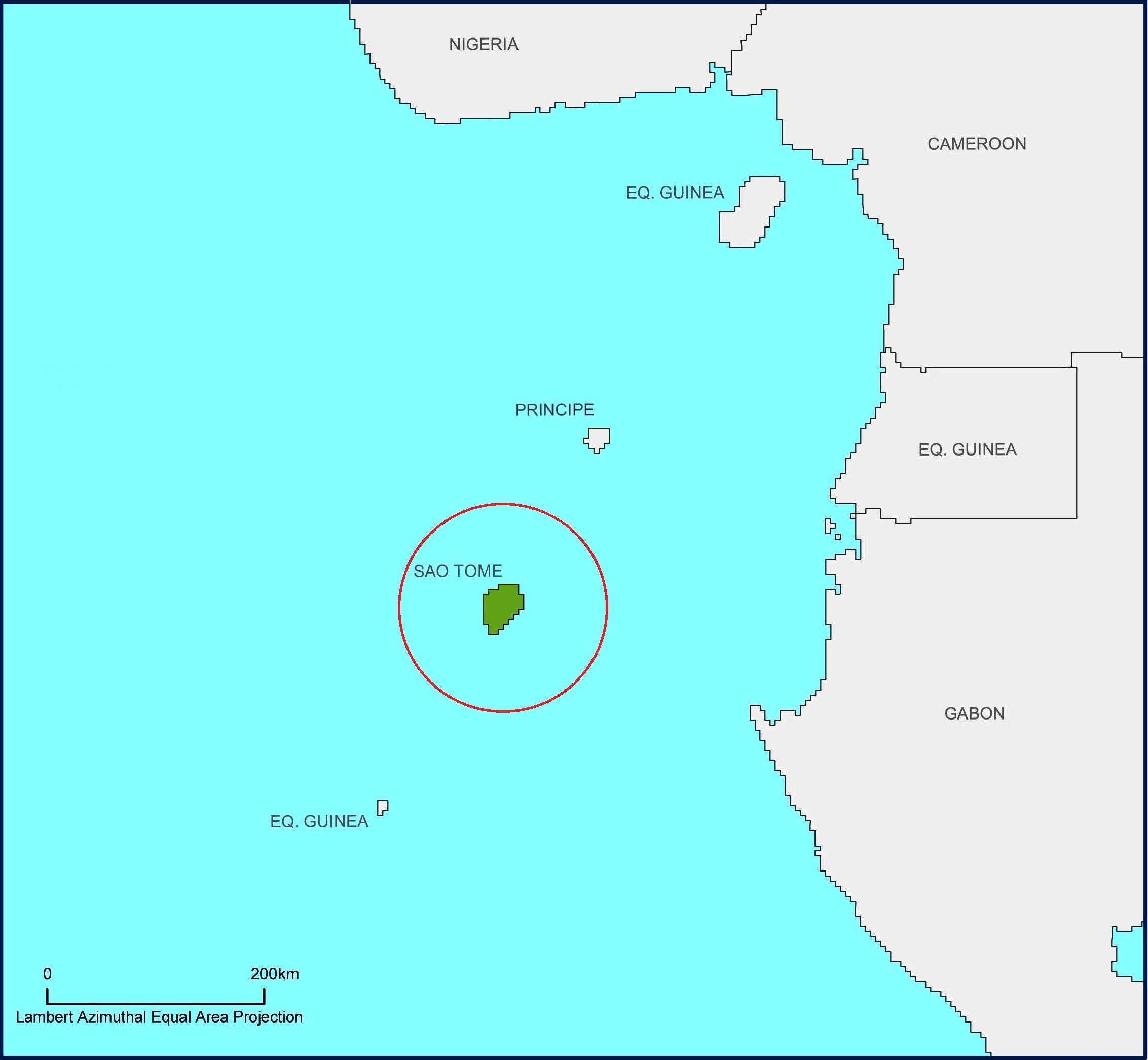
- range

Synonyms
- Tadarida (Chaerephon) tomensis Juste & Ibañez, 1993

Species of bat

The São Tomé free-tailed bat (Mops tomensis) is a species of bat in the family Molossidae. It is endemic to São Tomé and Príncipe. Its natural habitats are dry savanna, moist savanna, and plantations. It is threatened by habitat loss. Only three individuals have ever been documented.

== Taxonomy and etymology ==
It was described as a new species in 1993. Initially, the authors placed it in the genus Tadarida, but within the subgenus Chaerephon. Therefore, its scientific name was Tadarida (Chaerephon) tomensis.

Its species name "tomensis" means "belonging to Tomé," referencing the fact that the holotype was found on São Tomé and Príncipe. Based on its morphology, the authors hypothesized that it might be closely related to Gallagher's free-tailed bat.

== Description ==
Like other Mops species, its ears are connected to each other via a thin band of tissue called the interaural membrane. It is a small species of bat, with a forearm length of approximately 38.5 mm (1.52 in). Individuals weigh approximately 7.2 g (0.25 oz). The ears have rounded tips, and are wider than they are tall. Its antitragus is rectangular and defined, while the tragus is very small. Its wings are long and narrow, with the wing membranes whitish and nearly transparent. Its dorsal fur is dark brown, with its ventral fur a lighter brown. Its dental formula is 1.1.2.32.1.2.3, for a total of 30 teeth.

== Range and habitat ==
The holotype was located approximately 3 km (1.9 mi) northwest of Guadalupe, São Tomé and Príncipe in the vicinity of Praia das Conchas. Another specimen was collected near Água Izé. It has been documented in open savanna forest with baobob trees (Praia das Conchas) and humid forest and (Água Izé). Its habitat near Água Izé may have been lost to agricultural conversion, with the forest replaced by cocoa plantations.

== Conservation ==
It is currently assessed as endangered by the IUCN. As of 2019, the only individuals that have been documented were the three initially used to describe the species in 1993. It may also be declining due to competition with the little free-tailed bat.
