= List of lighthouses in São Tomé and Príncipe =

This is a list of lighthouses in São Tomé and Príncipe.

== Lighthouses ==
Name	Image	Year built	Location & coordinates	Class of light	Focal height	NGA number	Admiralty number	Range nml
Ana Chaves Range Rear Lighthouse		1994	São Tomé; 0°21′24.9″N 6°43′33.6″E	Iso G 4s.	9 metres (30 ft)	25200	D4234.1	6
Ilhéu Bom Bom Lighthouse		1997	Príncipe; 1°41′58.7″N 7°24′09.7″E	Fl (2) WR 10s.	64 metres (210 ft)	25180	D4158	white: 12 red: 9
Ilhéu das Cabras Lighthouse		1890	São Tomé; 0°24′32.6″N 6°42′58.7″E	Fl (2+1) W 15s.	98 metres (322 ft)	25184	D4230	12
Ilhéu Gago Coutinho Lighthouse		1929	São Tomé; 0°00′22.1″N 6°31′11.3″E	Fl (2) W 10s.	106 metres (348 ft)	25204	D4241	12
Lagoa Azul Lighthouse		1997	São Tomé; 0°24′26.8″N 6°36′36.4″E	Fl (2) W 15s.	34 metres (112 ft)	25183	D4243	12
Ponta Furada Lighthouse		n/a	São Tomé; 0°14′37.3″N 6°28′05.8″E	Fl W 8s.	49 metres (161 ft)	25205	D4242	12
Pónta da Mina Lighthouse		1996	Príncipe; 1°38′52.5″N 7°26′15.3″E	Fl (2) W 6s.	54 metres (177 ft)	25172	D4154	9
Santo António do Príncipe Lighthouse		1964	Santo António; 1°38′34.5″N 7°25′14.8″E	Fl (3) WRG 10s.	13 metres (43 ft)	25176	D4155	white: 9 red: 6 green: 6
São Sebastião Lighthouse		1928	São Tomé; 0°20′45.6″N 6°44′22.7″E	Fl (4) WR 12s.	14 metres (46 ft)	25192	D4237	white: 12 red: 9

== See also ==
- Lists of lighthouses and lightvessels
