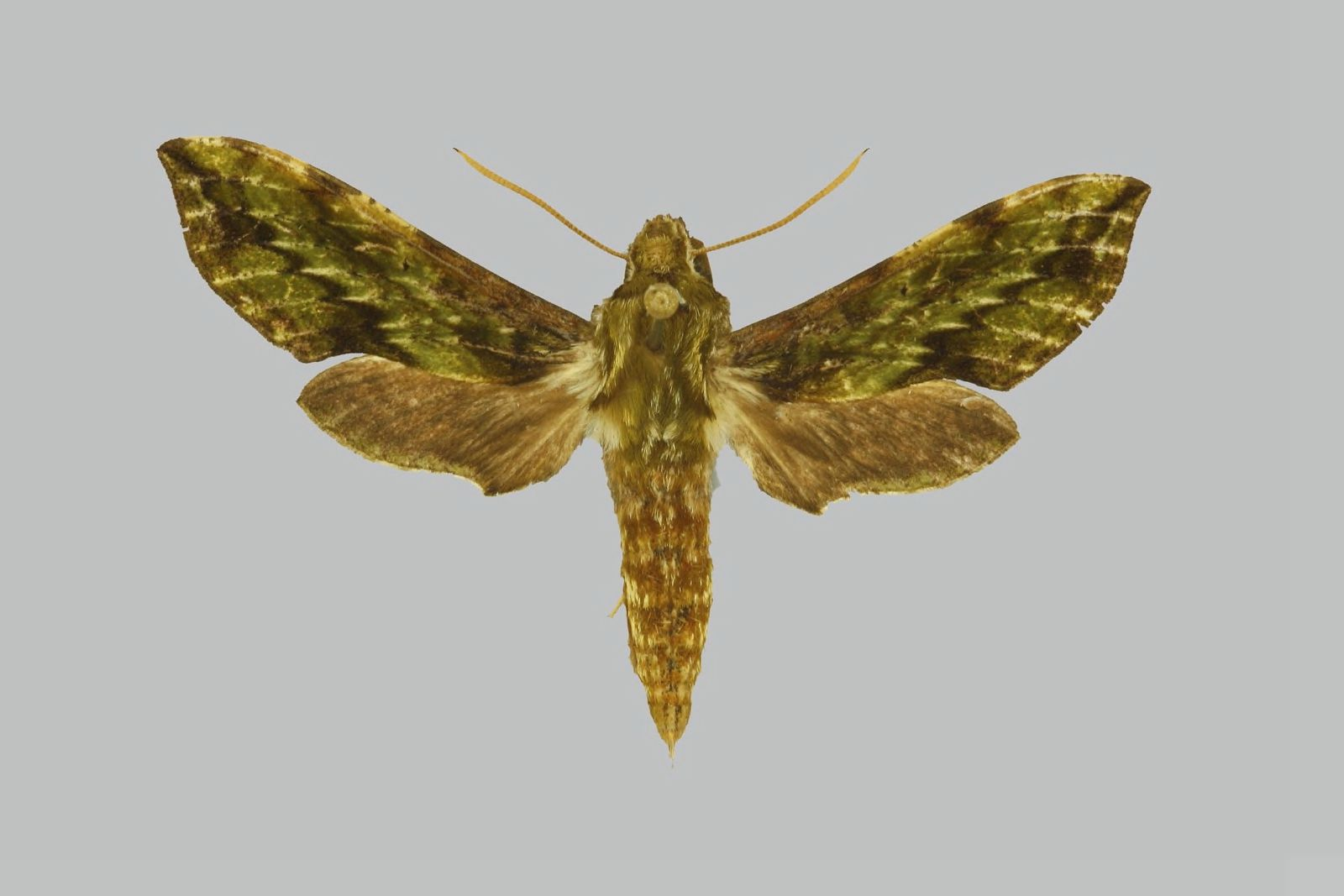
- Male from near Macambrara on the island of São Tomé

Scientific classification
- Kingdom: Animalia
- Phylum: Arthropoda
- Clade: Pancrustacea
- Class: Insecta
- Order: Lepidoptera
- Family: Sphingidae
- Genus: Theretra
- Species: T. viridis

Binomial name
- Theretra viridis Basquin, 1992
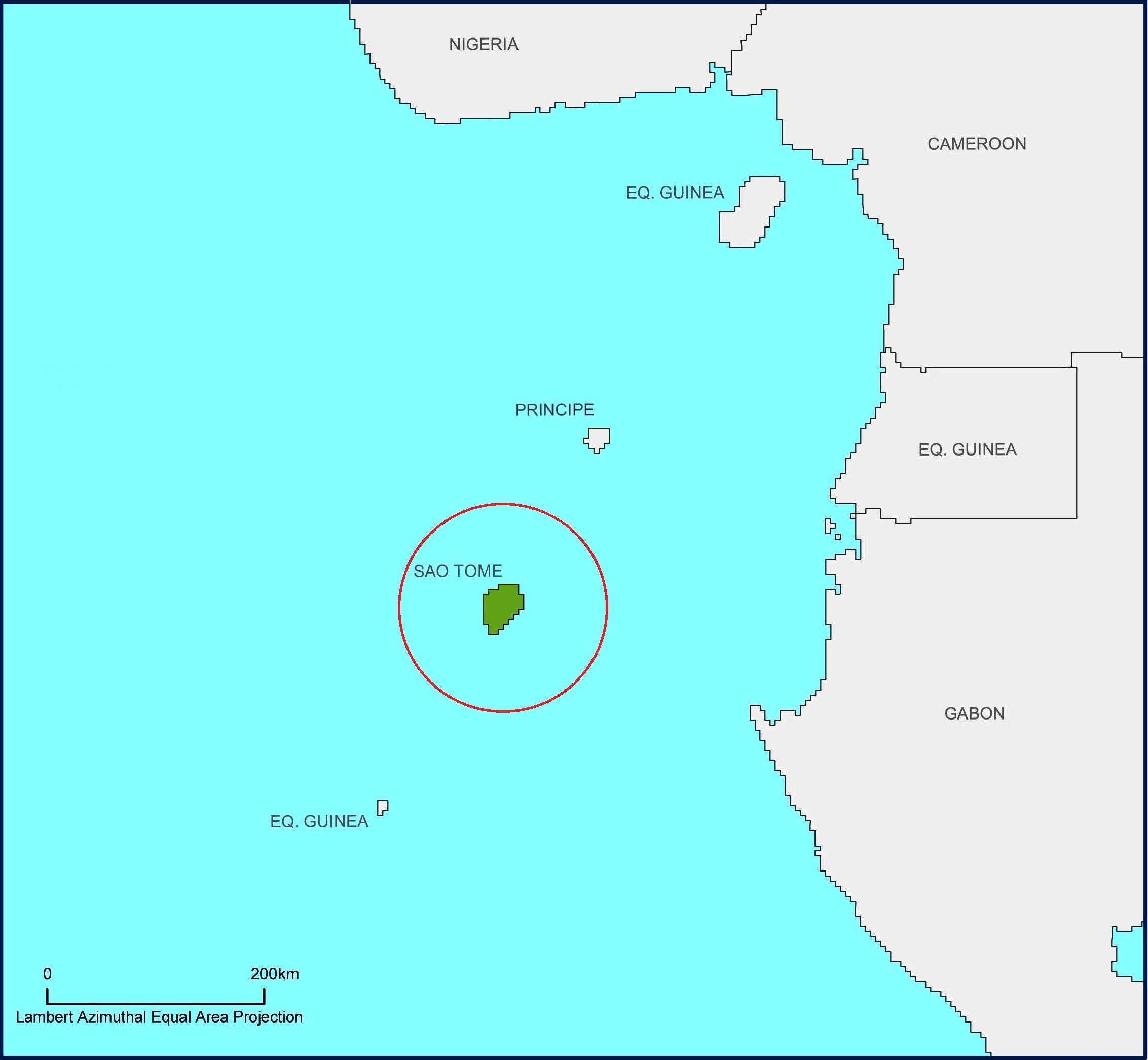
- range

= Theretra viridis =

Species of moth

Theretra viridis is a moth of the family Sphingidae first described by Patrick Basquin in 1992. It occurs on São Tomé Island. The type locality is Bombaim.

The wingspan is about 40 mm.
