= Agostinho Neto, São Tomé and Príncipe =

Agostinho Neto
- Village
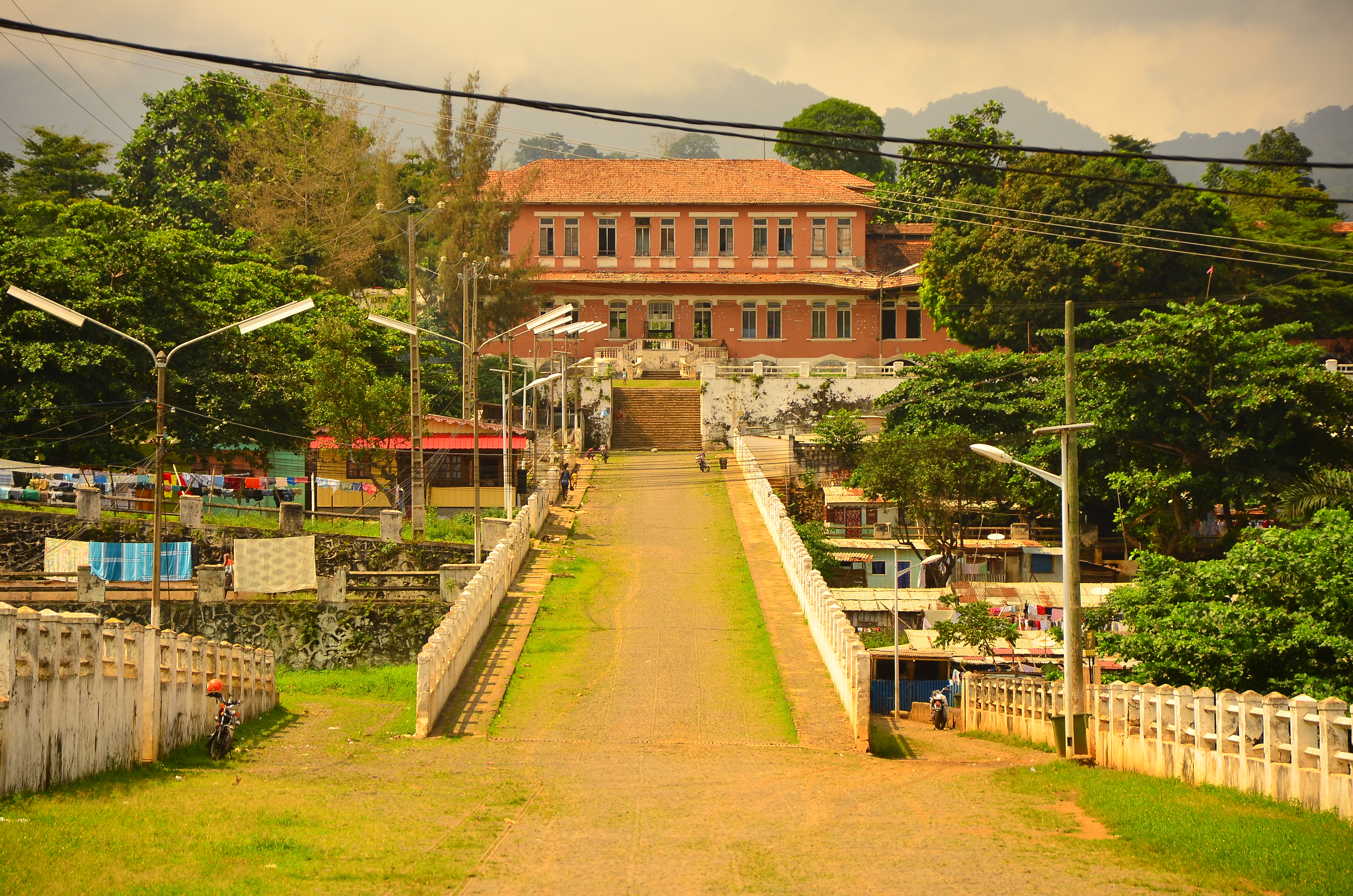
- Roça Rio do Ouro along the village's main street

- Location on São Tomé Island
- Coordinates: 0.3667°N 6.6434°E
- Country: São Tomé and Príncipe
- Island: São Tomé
- District: Lobata

Population (2012)
  - Total: 992
- Time zone: UTC+1 (WAT)

Agostinho Neto is a settlement in Lobata District on São Tomé Island in São Tomé and Príncipe. Its population is 992 (2012 census). It lies 1.5 km southeast of Guadalupe and 2.5 km west of Conde.

After São Tomé and Príncipe became independent in 1975, the settlement was named after the founding father of Angola, Agostinho Neto. The settlement grew around the plantation complex Roça Rio do Ouro, established in 1865. It is one of the most impressive agricultural structures in the country. There is a museum in the former mansion.

== Population history ==
Historical population
Year	Pop.	±%
2001	762	—
2008	869	+14.0%
2012	992	+14.2%

== Sports ==
The football (soccer) club of the village is Amador.
