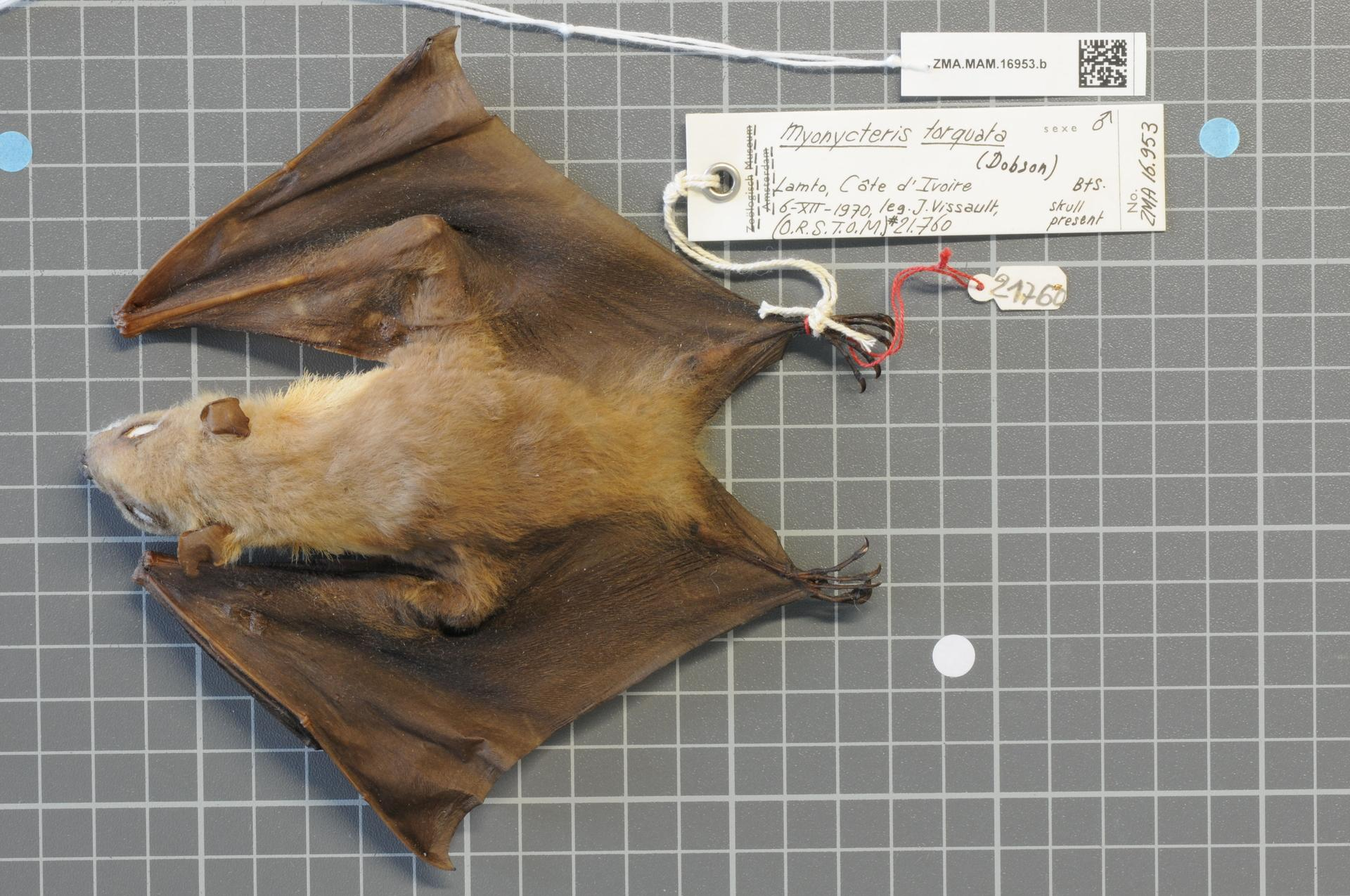
- Myonycteris torquata

Scientific classification
- Kingdom: Animalia
- Phylum: Chordata
- Class: Mammalia
- Order: Chiroptera
- Family: Pteropodidae
- Genus: Myonycteris; Matschie, 1899

Type species
- Cynonycteris torquata Dobson, 1878

= Myonycteris =

Genus of bats

Myonycteris (collared bat) is a genus of bat in the family Pteropodidae.

It contains the following species:

- Angolan rousette, Myonycteris angolensis
- São Tomé collared fruit bat, Myonycteris brachycephala
- Sierra Leone collared fruit bat, Myonycteris leptodon
- East African little collared fruit bat, Myonycteris relicta
- Little collared fruit bat, Myonycteris torquata
