= Praia das Conchas, São Tomé and Príncipe =

Praia das Conchas
- Village
- Location on São Tomé Island
- Coordinates: 0.3782°N 6.6121°E
- Country: São Tomé and Príncipe
- Island: São Tomé
- District: Lobata

Population (2012)
  - Total: 174
- Time zone: UTC+1 (WAT)

Praia das Conchas is a settlement in the western part of the Lobata District on São Tomé Island in São Tomé and Príncipe. Its population is 174 (2012 census). Established as a plantation (roça), Praia das Conchas lies 2 km from the coast, 3 km west of Guadalupe. There is a smaller seaside settlement also called Praia das Conchas, 3.5 km to the north.

== Population history ==
Historical population
Year	Pop.	±%
2001	246	—
2008	280	+13.8%
2012	174	−37.9%
