= Conde, São Tomé and Príncipe =

Conde
- Village
- Location on São Tomé Island
- Coordinates: 0.3758°N 6.6636°E
- Country: São Tomé and Príncipe
- Island: São Tomé
- District: Lobata

Population (2008)
  - Total: 1,807
- Time zone: UTC+1 (WAT)

Conde is a small town in Lobata District on São Tomé Island in São Tomé and Príncipe. Its population is 758 (2012 census). The town is located 3 km east of Guadalupe, 3 km northwest of Santo Amaro and 4 km southwest of Micoló.

== Population history ==
Historical population
Year	Pop.	±%
2001	1,585	—
2008	1,807	+14.0%
2012	758	−58.1%
