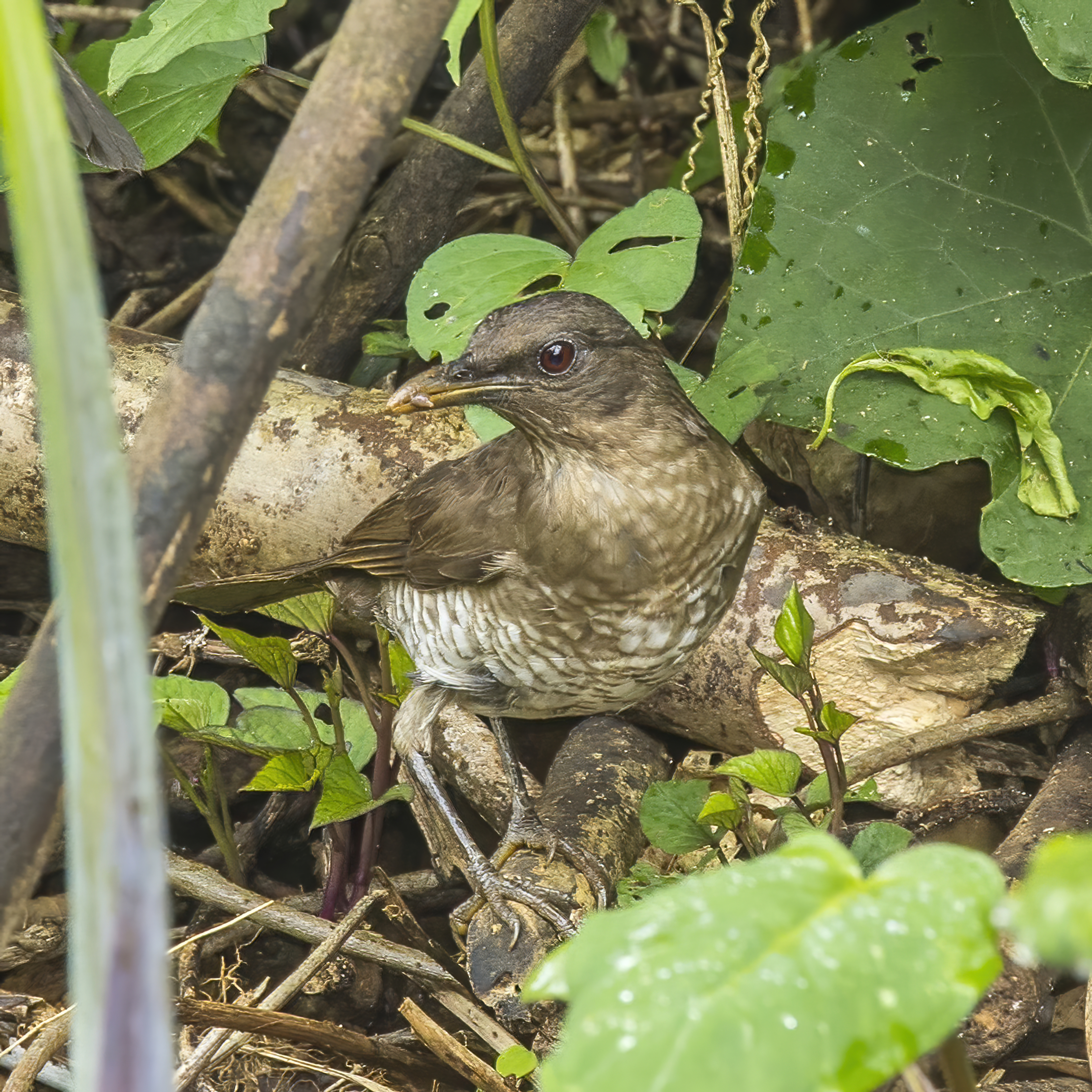
- São Tomé island

Conservation status
- Least Concern (IUCN 3.1)

Scientific classification
- Kingdom: Animalia
- Phylum: Chordata
- Class: Aves
- Order: Passeriformes
- Family: Turdidae
- Genus: Turdus
- Species: T. olivaceofuscus

Binomial name
- Turdus olivaceofuscus Hartlaub, 1852
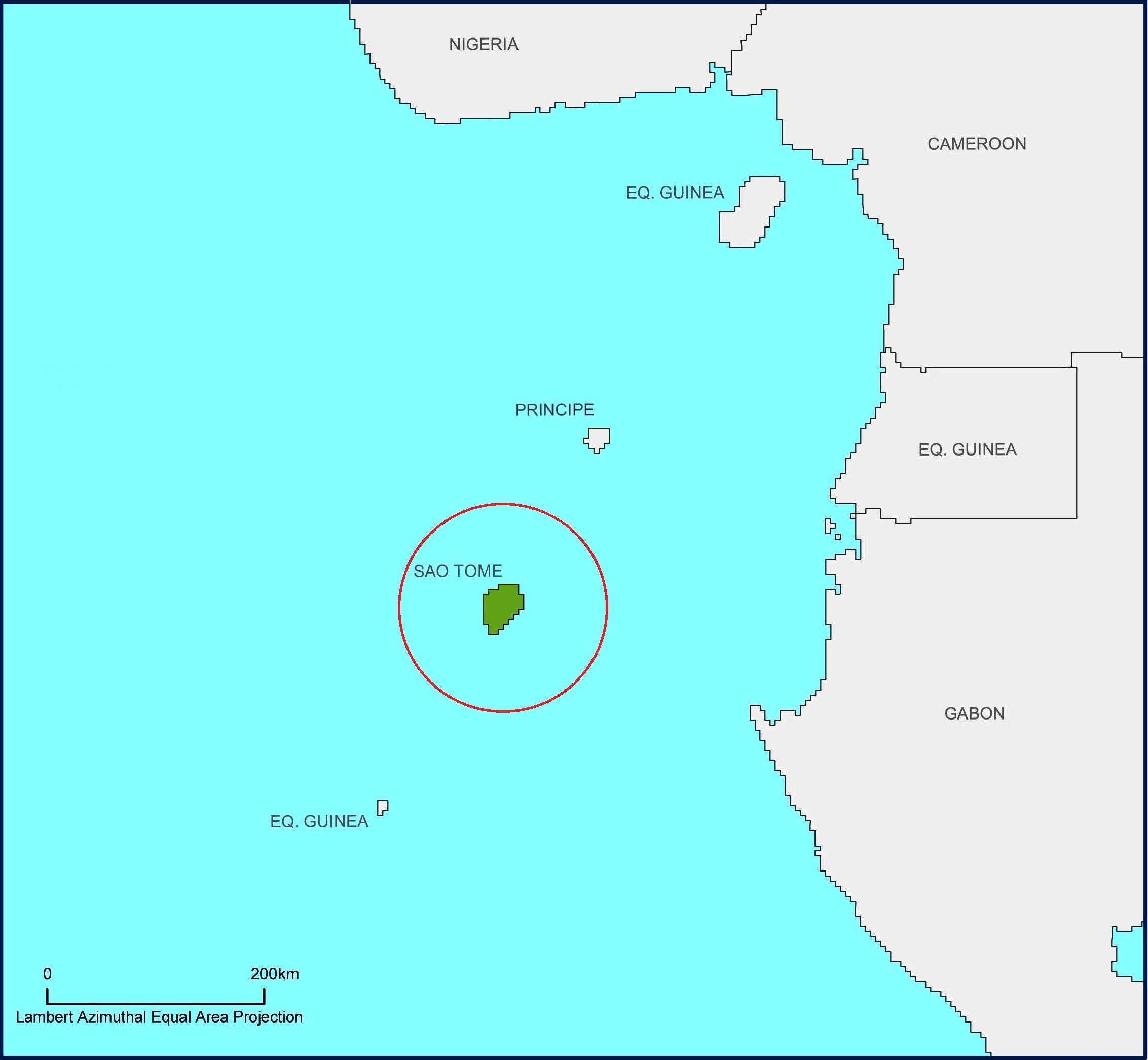
- range

= São Tomé thrush =

Species of bird

The São Tomé thrush or olivaceous thrush (Turdus olivaceofuscus) is a species of bird in the family Turdidae. It is endemic to São Tomé. Until 2010, the related Príncipe thrush (Turdus xanthorhynchus) was considered a subspecies, Turdus olivaceofuscus xanthorhynchus.

Its natural habitats are subtropical or tropical moist lowland forests and subtropical or tropical moist montane forests. It is threatened by habitat loss.
