= William Barbosa (footballer, born 1983) =

São Toméan footballer (born 1983)

Personal information
- Full name: William Cassandra Rosamonte Barbosa
- Date of birth: 18 December 1983 (age 42)
- Place of birth: Guadalupe, São Tomé and Príncipe
- Height: 1.90 m (6 ft 3 in)
- Position: Centre back

Team information
- Current team: Quinta do Conde
- Number: 6

Senior career*
Years	Team	Apps	(Gls)
- Inter Bom-Bom
- Andorinha
- 6 de Setembro
- Uniclinic
- Horizonte
2011	Santa Quitéria		
2012	São Luiz	2	(0)
2014	Santa Quitéria	8	(0)
2014–2015	Tourizense	11	(0)
2015–2016	Oliveira do Bairro	12	(2)
2016	Sabugal	16	(2)
2016–2017	Sampedrense		
2017–2018	Lusitano Évora	10	(1)
2018–2019	Estrela de Vendas Novas	17	(0)
2019–2020	Lusitano Évora	17	(0)
2021	Alfarim	2	(0)
2021–2022	Vitória de Setúbal B	20	(2)
2023–	Quinta do Conde	9	(0)

International career^{‡}
2012–2015	São Tomé and Príncipe	3	(0)
- * Club domestic league appearances and goals as of 22 April 2023 ‡ National team caps and goals as of 11 October 2015

William Cassandra Rosamonte Barbosa (born 18 December 1983) is a São Toméan footballer who plays as a centre back for Portuguese club AD Quinta do Conde. He was capped by the São Tomé and Príncipe national team.

== Club career ==
Barbosa left his natal São Tomé for Ceará, Brazil in 2009 to study nursing at Fortaleza-based Uniclinic. However, a short time later he joined the university football team and, due to his performances, he dropped the studies out to pursue a career as a footballer.
