= Ilhéu das Cabras =

Island in São Tomé and Príncipe

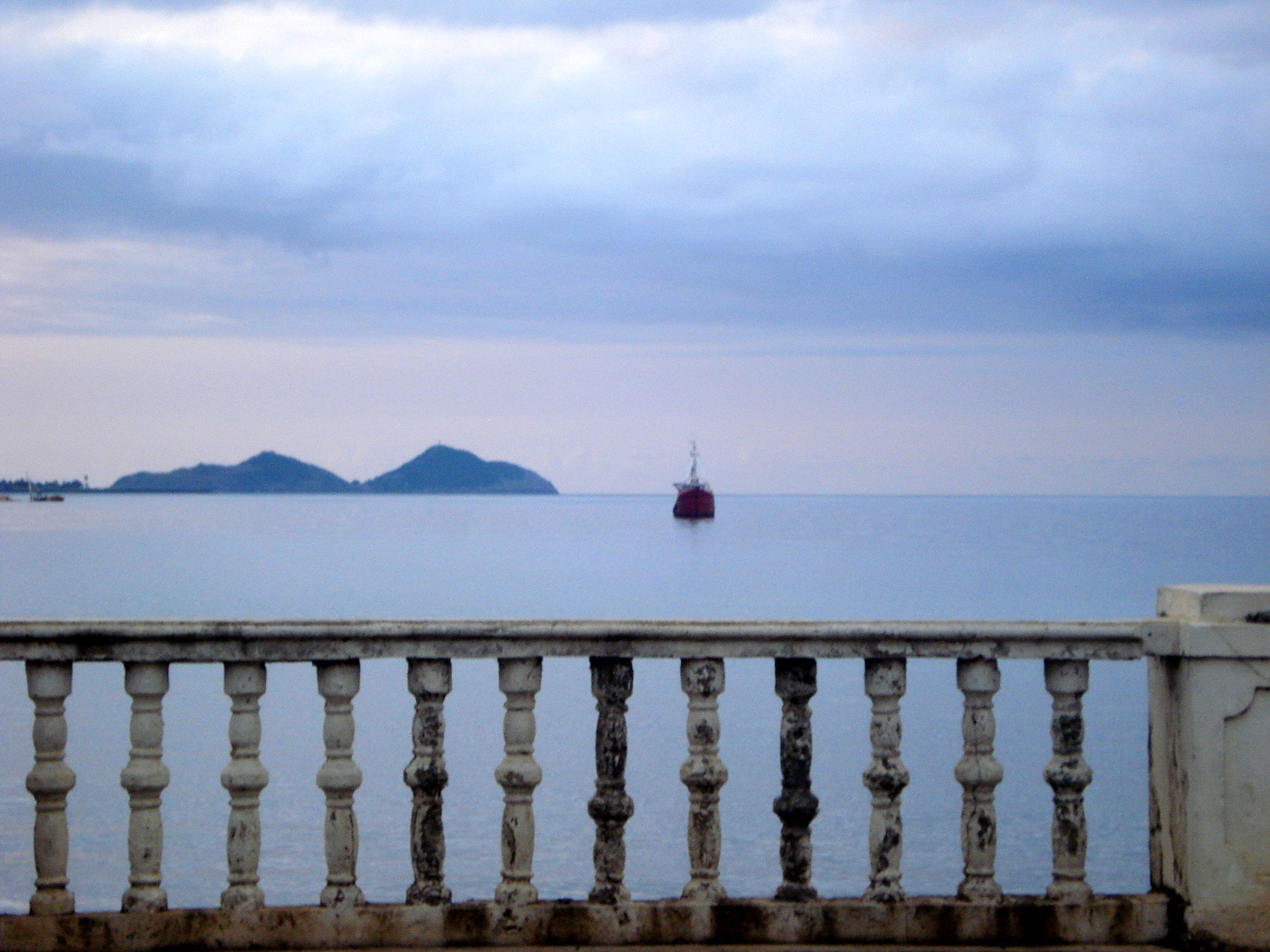
- Ilhéu das Cabras seen from the city of São Tomé

- Location within São Tomé

Geography
- Location: north of São Tomé near the urban area of São Tomé, São Tomé and Príncipe
- Coordinates: 0.408°N 6.715°E
- Highest elevation: 90 m (300 ft)

Administration
- São Tomé and Príncipe

Demographics
- Population: 0

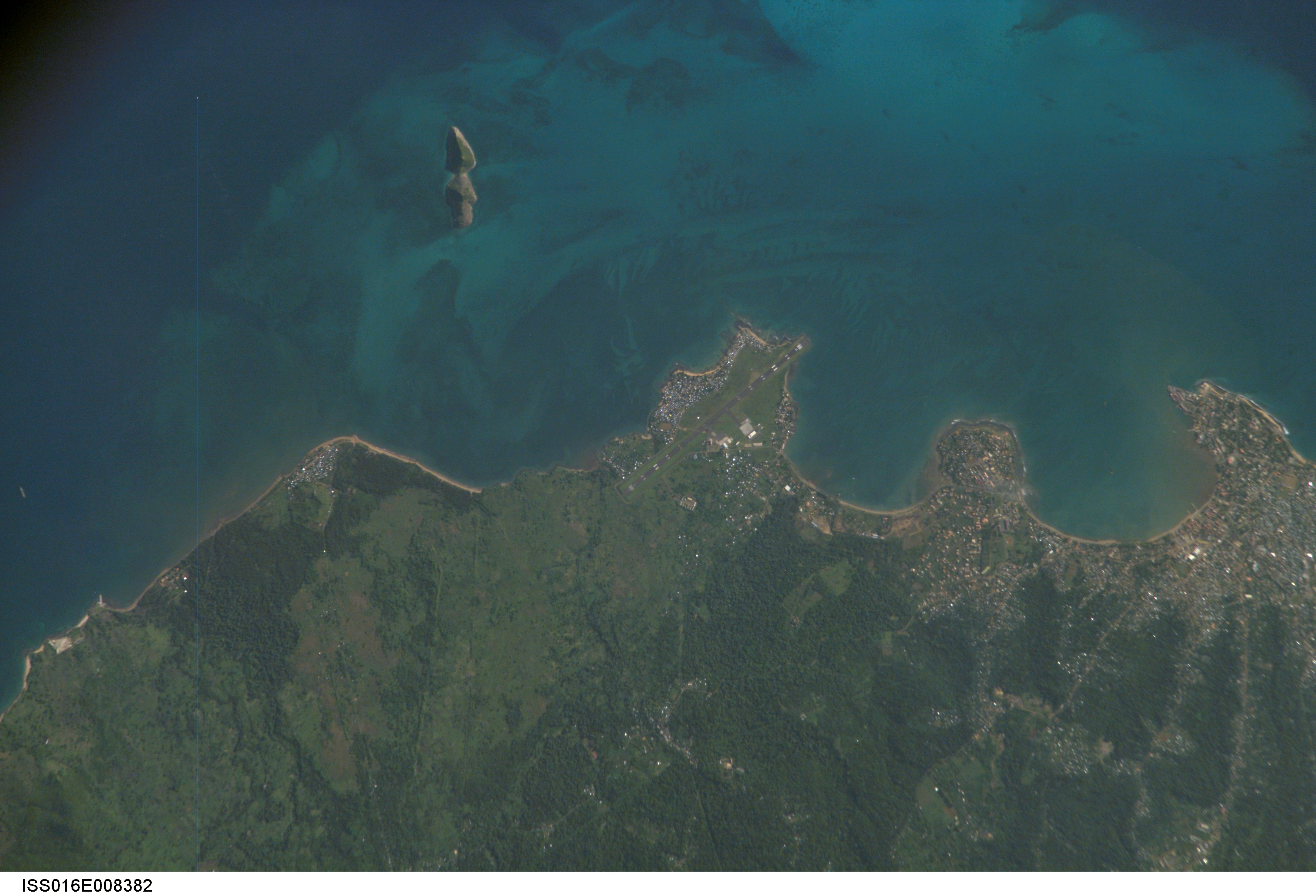
Satellite photo of the northern part of the island of São Tomé with Ilhéu das Cabras

Ilhéu das Cabras is an uninhabited island in the Gulf of Guinea. It is one of the smaller islands of São Tomé and Príncipe. The islet is located about 2 km off the northeast coast of the island of São Tomé, 8 km north of the city centre of São Tomé. The islet consists of two hills, about 90 metres high. There is a lighthouse on the northeastern summit, built in 1890; its focal height 97 metres and its range is 12 nmi (22 km; 14 mi). The islet was mentioned as "Mooro Caebres" in the 1665 map by Johannes Vingboons.
