= Santo Amaro, São Tomé and Príncipe =

Santo Amaro
- Location on São Tomé Island
- Coordinates: 0°22′0″N 6°41′20″E
- Country: São Tomé and Príncipe
- Island: São Tomé
- District: Lobata

Population (2012)
  - Total: 1,063
- Time zone: UTC+1 (WAT)

Santo Amaro is a town in São Tomé and Príncipe. It is located in Lobata District, northern São Tomé Island. Its population is 1063 (2012 census). It lies 0.8 km north of Bela Vista, 3 km east of Conde and 6 km northwest of the city centre of the capital São Tomé.

== Population history ==
Historical population
Year	Pop.	±%
2001	494	—
2008	563	+14.0%
2012	1,063	+88.8%
