= Guadalupe, São Tomé and Príncipe =

Guadalupe
- Town
- Location on São Tomé Island
- Coordinates: 0°22′48″N 6°38′17″E
- Country: São Tomé and Príncipe
- Island: São Tomé
- District: Lobata

Population (2012)
  - Total: 7,604
- Time zone: UTC+1 (WAT)

Guadalupe is a town located in the northern part of São Tomé Island, which is part of the island nation of São Tomé and Príncipe. It is the seat of Lobata District. Its population is 7,604 (2012 census). Guadalupe lies 1.5 km northwest of Agostinho Neto, 10 km east of Neves and 11 km northwest of the capital São Tomé.

== Population history ==
Historical population
Year	Pop.	±%
2001	1,543	—
2012	7,604	+392.8%

== Notable people ==
- William Barbosa, footballer
- Olinda Beja, writer
