= Aeroport =

Aeroport or Aéroport may refer to:

- Airport
- Aéroport, a quartier in Saint Barthélemy, France
- Aeroport (Kyiv Metro), a station on the Podilsko–Vyhurivska line of the Kyiv Metro, Kyiv, Ukraine
- Aeroport (Metrovalencia), a station of the Metrovalencia, Valencia, Spain
- Aeroport (Moscow Metro), a station of the Moscow Metro, Moscow, Russia
- Aeroport, Oymyakonsky District, Sakha Republic, a village in Oymyakonsky District, Sakha Republic
- Aeroport, Tomponsky District, Sakha Republic, a village in Tomponsky District, Sakha Republic
- Aeroport District, a district of Northern Administrative Okrug of Moscow, Russia
- Airport T2 station, a Rodalies de Catalunya station serving Barcelona–El Prat Airport, in El Prat de Llobregat, Catalonia, Spain

== See also ==
- Aeroporto (disambiguation)
- Airport (disambiguation)
- Aviaport, the name of several villages in the Sakha Republic
