= Delinya =

Delinya Делинья / Дэлинньэ
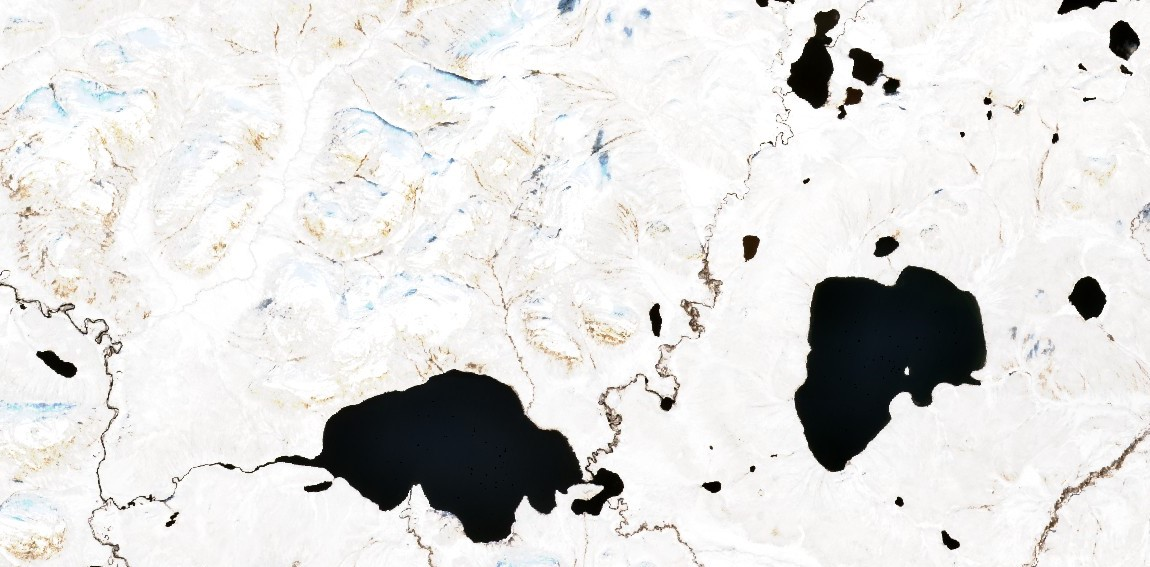
- Lake Delinya (left) at the sources of the river. Sentinel-2 image

- Mouth location in Yakutia, Russia

Location
- Country: Russian Federation

Physical characteristics
- Source: Elgi Plateau
  - coordinates: 64°51′52″N 139°40′20″E
  - elevation: 910 m (2,990 ft)
- Mouth: Tompo
  - coordinates: 64°07′39″N 136°01′13″E
  - elevation: 416 m (1,365 ft)
- Length: 357 km (222 mi)
- Basin size: 12,500 km^{2} (4,800 sq mi)

Basin features
- Progression: Tompo → Aldan→ Lena→ Laptev Sea

The Delinya (Russian: Делинья; Yakut: Дэлинньэ, romanized: Delinņe) is a river in Tompo District, Yakutia (Sakha Republic), Russian Federation, a right tributary of the Tompo, part of the Aldan / Lena basin. It has a length of 357 kilometres (222 mi) and a drainage basin area of 12,500 square kilometres (4,800 mi^{2}).

The river flows across a desolate area of Tompo District. The nearest inhabited place is Topolinoye, located by the banks of the Tompo, to the south of its confluence with the Delinya. The name of both the river and the lake is derived from the Even Delinde, meaning "big taimen."

== Course ==
The Delinya originates in an area of high-altitude lakes of the Elgi Plateau. It has its sources very close to lake Delinya, with an area of 7.5 km^{2} (2.9 sq mi), and flows across it. The river heads roughly westwards across the mountain area and then it bends southwestwards and flows southwards with the Khunkhadin Range to the west. Finally if meets the right bank of the Tompo 286 km (178 mi) from its confluence with the Aldan.

=== Tributaries ===
The main tributaries of the Delinya are the 82 km (51 mi) long Singyami on the left, as well as the 96 km (60 mi) long Noluchu and the 92 km (57 mi) long Imnekan on the right. The river is fed by snow and rain. It freezes before mid October and stays frozen until the second half of May. There are 860 lakes in the river basin.

== See also ==
- List of rivers of Russia
- Yana-Oymyakon Highlands#Hydrography
