= Saydy =

Saydy (Russian: Сайды) is the name of several rural localities in the Sakha Republic, Russia:

- Saydy, Tomponsky District, Sakha Republic, a selo in Ynginsky Rural Okrug of Tomponsky District
- Saydy, Verkhoyansky District, Sakha Republic, a selo in Eginsky Rural Okrug of Verkhoyansky District
