= Razvilka =

Razvilka (Russian: Развилка) is the name of several rural localities in Russia:

- Razvilka, Moscow Oblast, a settlement in Razvilkovskoye Rural Settlement of Leninsky District of Moscow Oblast
- Razvilka, Sakha Republic, a selo in Teploklyuchevsky Rural Okrug of Tomponsky District of the Sakha Republic
