= Udarnik (disambiguation) =

A udarnik was a supposedly high productivity worker in communist countries.

Udarnik may also refer to:

- Udarnik, Kemin, a village in Chüy Region, Kyrgyzstan
- Udarnik, Sakha Republic, a rural locality in Tomponsky District, Russia
- Udarnik, Voronezh Oblast, a rural locality in Buturlinovsky District, Russia
