= Praia Inhame, Príncipe =

Praia Inhame
- Settlement
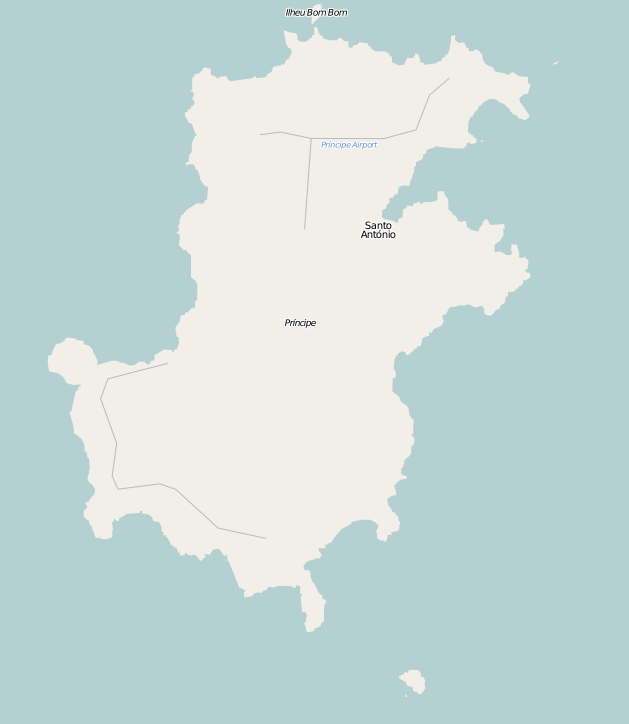
- Location on Príncipe Island
- Coordinates: 1.6652°N 7.4132°E
- Country: São Tomé and Príncipe
- Autonomous Region: Príncipe

Population (2012)
  - Total: 128
- Time zone: UTC+1 (WAT)

Praia Inhame is a settlement in the northern part of Príncipe Island in São Tomé and Príncipe. Its population is 128 (2012 census). Northeast is Picão, south is Santo António and west is Aeroporto settlement.

== Population history ==
Historical population
Year	Pop.	±%
2001	271	—
2008	309	+14.0%
2012	128	−58.6%
