= Picão =

- Settlement
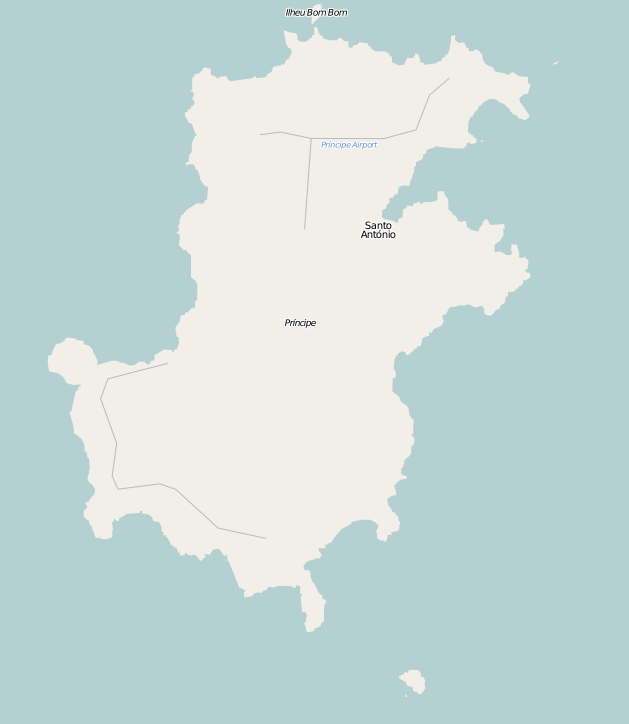
- Location on Príncipe Island
- Coordinates: 1.6657°N 7.431°E
- Country: São Tomé and Príncipe
- Autonomous Region: Príncipe

Population (2012)
  - Total: 278
- Time zone: UTC+1 (WAT)

Picão is a settlement in the northeastern part of Príncipe Island in São Tomé and Príncipe. Its population is 278 (2012 census). The settlement is located northeast of the island capital Santo António. To the northeast is Belo Monte, to the east is Praia Grande, a beach, to the south is Praia Inhame and to the west is the settlement of Aeroporto.

== Population history ==
Historical population
Year	Pop.	±%
2001	68	—
2008	78	+14.7%
2012	278	+256.4%
