= Razvilka, Sakha Republic =

Razvilka Развилка
- Selo
- Interactive map of Razvilka
- Location of Razvilka Razvilka (Sakha Republic)
- Coordinates: 63°05′N 138°09′E
- Country: Russia
- Federal subject: Sakha Republic
- Administrative district: Tomponsky District
- Rural okrugSelsoviet: Teploklyuchevsky Rural Okrug
- Founded: 1983

Population (2010 Census)
  - Total: 76
  - Estimate (2021): 13 (−82.9%)

Municipal status
  - Municipal district: Tomponsky Municipal District
  - Rural settlement: Teploklyuchevsky Rural Settlement
- Time zone: UTC+
- Postal codes: 678655, 678728
- OKTMO ID: 98650433111

Razvilka (Russian: Разви́лка) is a rural locality (a selo) in Tomponsky District of the Sakha Republic, Russia, located 93 kilometers (58 mi) from Tyoply Klyuch, the administrative center of the rural okrug, and 166 kilometers (103 mi) from Khandyga, the administrative center of the district. Its population as of the 2010 Census was 76; down from 323 recorded in the 2002 Census.
