= Nova Estrela =

- Settlement
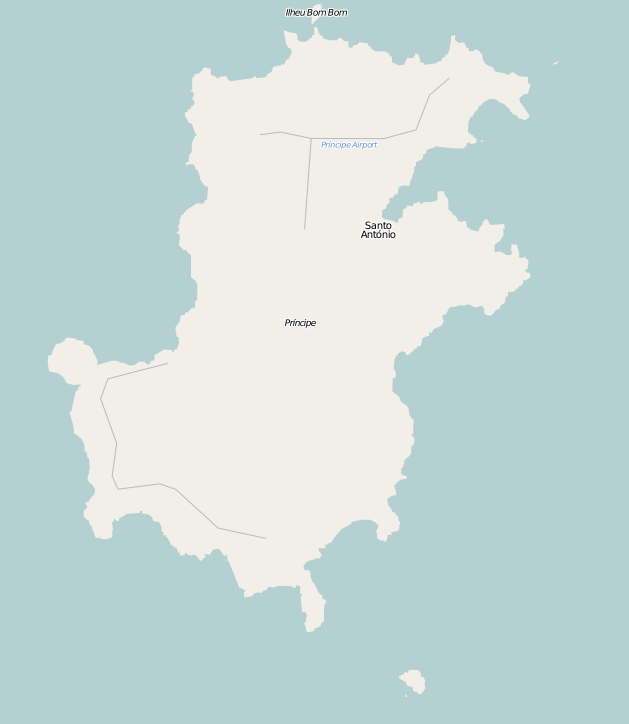
- Location on Príncipe Island
- Coordinates: 1.6196°N 7.4308°E
- Country: São Tomé and Príncipe
- Autonomous Region: Príncipe

Population (2012)
  - Total: 222
- Time zone: UTC+1 (WAT)

Nova Estrela (Portuguese for new star) is a village in the eastern part of Príncipe Island in São Tomé and Príncipe. Its population is 222 (2012 census). Nova Estrela is located 2 km southeast of the island capital of Santo António.

Nearby settlements include Portinho to the northeast, Terreiro Velho to the southwest and Bela Vista to the west.

== Population history ==
Historical population
Year	Pop.	±%
2001	263	—
2008	300	+14.1%
2012	222	−26.0%
