= Portinho =

Portinho may refer to:

== People ==
- Carlos Portinho (born 1973), Brazilian politician and lawyer
- Carmen Portinho (1903-2001), Brazilian civil engineer, urbanist and feminist

== Places ==
- Portinho, São Tomé and Príncipe
- Portinho da Arrábida, Portugal
