= Udarnik, Sakha Republic =

Udarnik Ударник
- Selo
- Interactive map of Udarnik
- Location of Udarnik Udarnik (Sakha Republic)
- Coordinates: 62°55′49″N 134°27′55″E
- Country: Russia
- Federal subject: Sakha Republic
- Administrative district: Tomponsky District
- Rural okrugSelsoviet: Bayagantaysky Rural Okrug

Population
  - Estimate (2002): 159 )

Municipal status
  - Municipal district: Tomponsky Municipal District
  - Rural settlement: Bayagantaysky Rural Settlement
- Time zone: UTC+
- Postal code: 678724
- OKTMO ID: 98650405111

Udarnik (Russian: Ударник) is a rural locality (a selo), and one of three settlements in Bayagantaysky Rural Okrug of Tomponsky District in the Sakha Republic, Russia, in addition to Krest-Khaldzhan, the administrative center of the Rural Okrug and Ary-Tolon. It is located 115 kilometers (71 mi) from Khandyga, the administrative center of the district and 25 kilometers (16 mi) from Krest-Kaldzhan. Its population as of the 2002 Census was 159. It is named after the Russian word for a hard worker.
