= Tyoply Klyuch, Sakha Republic =

Tyoply Klyuch Теплый Ключ
- Selo
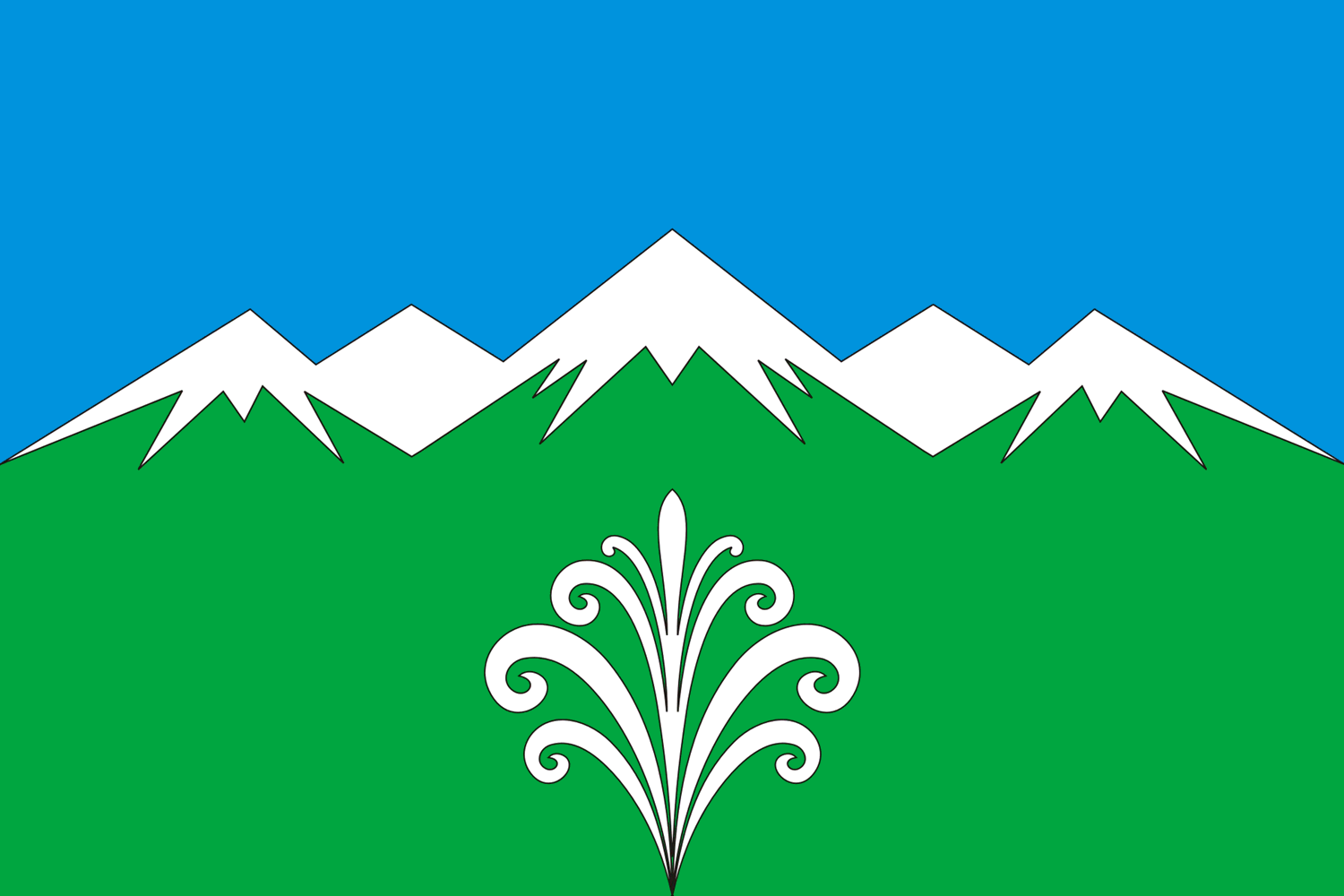
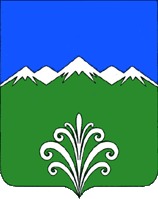
- Flag Coat of arms
- Interactive map of Tyoply Klyuch
- Location of Tyoply Klyuch Tyoply Klyuch (Sakha Republic)
- Coordinates: 62°46′59″N 136°46′49″E
- Country: Russia
- Federal subject: Sakha Republic
- Administrative district: Tomponsky District
- Rural okrugSelsoviet: Teploklyuchevsky Rural Okrug

Population
  - Estimate (2002): 596 )

Administrative status
  - Capital of: Teploklyuchevsky Rural Okrug

Municipal status
  - Municipal district: Tomponsky Municipal District
  - Rural settlement: Teploklyuchevsky Rural Settlement
  - Capital of: Teploklyuchevsky Rural Settlement
- Time zone: UTC+
- Postal code: 678655
- OKTMO ID: 98650433101

Tyoply Klyuch (Russian: Теплый Ключ; Yakut: Сылаас Күлүүс, Sılaas Külüüs) is a rural locality (a selo), the administrative centre of and one of three settlements, in addition to Aeroport and Razbilka, in Teploklyuchevsky Rural Okrug of Tomponsky District in the Sakha Republic, Russia. It is located 90 kilometers (56 mi) from Khandyga, the administrative center of the district. Its population as of the 2002 Census was 596.

== Geography ==
Tyoply Klyuch is located by the Eastern Khandyga river, a right tributary of the Aldan, part of the Lena basin.
