= Novy, Tomponsky District, Sakha Republic =

Novy Новый
- Selo
- Interactive map of Novy
- Location of Novy Novy (Sakha Republic)
- Coordinates: 62°35′N 135°32′E
- Country: Russia
- Federal subject: Sakha Republic
- Administrative district: Tomponsky District
- Rural okrugSelsoviet: Ynginsky Rural Okrug

Population
  - Estimate (2002): 294 )

Administrative status
  - Capital of: Ynginsky Rural Okrug

Municipal status
  - Municipal district: Tomponsky Municipal District
  - Rural settlement: Ynginsky Rural Settlement
  - Capital of: Ynginsky Rural Settlement
- Time zone: UTC+
- Postal code: 678726
- OKTMO ID: 98650440101

Novy (Russian: Но́вый) is a rural locality (a selo) and the administrative center, and one of two inhabited localities including Saydy of Ynginsky Rural Okrug in Tomponsky District of the Sakha Republic, Russia, located 8 kilometers (5.0 mi) from Khandyga, the administrative center of the district. Its population as of the 2002 Census was 294.
