= Okhotsky-Perevoz =

Okhotsky-Perevoz Охотский-Перевоз
- Selo
- Interactive map of Okhotsky-Perevoz
- Location of Okhotsky-Perevoz Okhotsky-Perevoz (Sakha Republic)
- Coordinates: 61°33′N 135°32′E
- Country: Russia
- Federal subject: Sakha Republic
- Administrative district: Tomponsky District
- Rural okrugSelsoviet: Okhot-Perevozovsky Rural Okrug

Population (2010 Census)
  - Total: 142
  - Estimate (2021): 136 (−4.2%)

Administrative status
  - Capital of: Okhot-Perevozovsky Rural Okrug

Municipal status
  - Municipal district: Tomponsky Municipal District
  - Rural settlement: Okhot-Perevozovsky Rural Settlement
  - Capital of: Okhot-Perevozovsky Rural Settlement
- Time zone: UTC+
- Postal code: 678729
- OKTMO ID: 98650425101

Okhotsky-Perevoz (Russian: Охотский-Перевоз) is a rural locality (a selo), the only inhabited locality, and the administrative center of Okhot-Perevozovsky Rural Okrug of Tomponsky District in the Sakha Republic, Russia, located 120 kilometers (75 mi) from Khandyga, the administrative center of the district. Its population as of the 2010 Census was 142, down from 157 recorded during the 2002 Census.

== Climate ==
Okhotsky-Perevoz has an extreme subarctic climate (Köppen Dfd) with extremely cold, long winters, and short, damp summers.

Climate data for Okhotsky-Perevoz
Month	Jan	Feb	Mar	Apr	May	Jun	Jul	Aug	Sep	Oct	Nov	Dec	Year
Record high °C (°F)	0.0 (32.0)	−10.4 (13.3)	11.0 (51.8)	16.2 (61.2)	29.5 (85.1)	36.0 (96.8)	36.8 (98.2)	33.9 (93.0)	25.1 (77.2)	13.0 (55.4)	2.8 (37.0)	−1.3 (29.7)	36.8 (98.2)
Mean daily maximum °C (°F)	−39.7 (−39.5)	−32.1 (−25.8)	−14.0 (6.8)	0.4 (32.7)	11.8 (53.2)	20.9 (69.6)	23.5 (74.3)	20.5 (68.9)	10.8 (51.4)	−5.2 (22.6)	−26.1 (−15.0)	−36.9 (−34.4)	−5.5 (22.1)
Daily mean °C (°F)	−43.4 (−46.1)	−38.2 (−36.8)	−23.6 (−10.5)	−6.9 (19.6)	6.0 (42.8)	14.6 (58.3)	17.0 (62.6)	13.9 (57.0)	5.0 (41.0)	−9.5 (14.9)	−30.5 (−22.9)	−40.2 (−40.4)	−11.3 (11.6)
Mean daily minimum °C (°F)	−47.7 (−53.9)	−44.7 (−48.5)	−33.8 (−28.8)	−16.6 (2.1)	−1.5 (29.3)	6.8 (44.2)	9.2 (48.6)	6.6 (43.9)	−1.1 (30.0)	−14.9 (5.2)	−35.5 (−31.9)	−44.4 (−47.9)	−19.0 (−2.2)
Record low °C (°F)	−58.9 (−74.0)	−58.9 (−74.0)	−52.8 (−63.0)	−42.2 (−44.0)	−20.0 (−4.0)	−3.2 (26.2)	−2.2 (28.0)	−5.0 (23.0)	−15.7 (3.7)	−39.0 (−38.2)	−52.8 (−63.0)	−58.6 (−73.5)	−58.9 (−74.0)
Average precipitation mm (inches)	9.5 (0.37)	13.1 (0.52)	32.8 (1.29)	38.4 (1.51)	55.4 (2.18)	70.2 (2.76)	43.0 (1.69)	56.7 (2.23)	63.9 (2.52)	92.2 (3.63)	53.0 (2.09)	11.0 (0.43)	539.2 (21.22)
Average precipitation days	8.1	6.3	5.0	4.2	4.4	5.5	5.5	5.0	5.9	9.9	9.6	8.0	77.4
