= Aeroporto station =

Aeroporto station may refer to:

- Aeroporto station (Lisbon Metro), a metro station on the Lisbon Metro serving Lisbon Airport in Portugal
- Aeroporto station (Porto Metro), a light rail station on the Porto Metro serving Porto Airport in Portugal
- Aeroporto station (Salvador Metro), a metro station on the Salvador Metro serving Salvador Bahia Airport in Brazil
- Aeroporto–Guarulhos station (CPTM), a railway station serving São Paulo/Guarulhos International Airport in Brazil
- Bari Aeroporto railway station, a railway station serving Bari Karol Wojtyła Airport in Italy
- Fiumicino Aeroporto railway station, a railway station serving Rome Fiumicino Airport in Italy
- Malpensa Aeroporto Terminal 1 railway station, a railway station serving terminal 1 of Milan–Malpensa Airport in Italy
- Malpensa Aeroporto Terminal 2 railway station, a railway station serving terminal 2 of Milan–Malpensa Airport in Italy
- Palermo Aeroporto railway station, a railway station serving Palermo Airport in Italy
- Pisa Aeroporto railway station, a former railway station serving Pisa International Airport in Italy
- Reggio di Calabria Aeroporto railway station, a railway station serving Reggio Calabria Airport in Italy
- Torino Aeroporto railway station, a railway station serving Turin Airport in Italy

== See also ==
- Aeroporto (disambiguation)
- Airport station (disambiguation)
