= Tyoply Klyuch =

Tyoply Klyuch (Russian: Тёплый Ключ) is the name of several rural localities in Russia:

- Tyoply Klyuch, Republic of Bashkortostan, a village in Verkhnekiginsky Selsoviet of Kiginsky District in the Republic of Bashkortostan; 55°19′N 58°41′E
- Tyoply Klyuch, Abansky District, Krasnoyarsk Krai, a settlement in Apano-Klyuchinsky Selsoviet of Abansky District in Krasnoyarsk Krai
- Tyoply Klyuch, Krasnoturansky District, Krasnoyarsk Krai, a settlement in Sayansky Selsoviet of Krasnoturansky District in Krasnoyarsk Krai
- Tyoply Klyuch, Penza Oblast, a village in Yeremeyevsky Selsoviet of Sosnovoborsky District in Penza Oblast
- Tyoply Klyuch, Sakha Republic, a selo in Teploklyuchevsky Rural Okrug of Tomponsky District in the Sakha Republic
- Tyoply Klyuch, Sverdlovsk Oblast, a village in Karginsky Selsoviet of Achitsky District in Sverdlovsk Oblast
- Tyoply Klyuch, Republic of Tatarstan, a village in Vysokogorsky District of the Republic of Tatarstan
