= Krest-Khaldzhay =

Krest-Khaldzhay Крест-Хальджай
- Selo
- Flag
- Interactive map of Krest-Khaldzhay
- Location of Krest-Khaldzhay Krest-Khaldzhay (Sakha Republic)
- Coordinates: 62°48′27″N 134°32′28″E
- Country: Russia
- Federal subject: Sakha Republic
- Administrative district: Tomponsky District
- Rural okrugSelsoviet: Bayagantaysky Rural Okrug

Population
  - Estimate (2002): 1,513 )

Administrative status
  - Capital of: Bayagantaysky Rural Okrug

Municipal status
  - Municipal district: Tomponsky Municipal District
  - Rural settlement: Bayagantaysky Rural Settlement
  - Capital of: Bayagantaysky Rural Settlement
- Time zone: UTC+
- Postal code: 678724
- OKTMO ID: 98650405101

Krest-Khaldzhay (Russian: Крест-Хальджай; Yakut: Кириэс-Халдьаайы, romanized: Kiries Xalcaayı) is a rural locality (a selo), the administrative centre of and one of three settlements, in addition to Ary-Tolon and Udarnik, in Bayagantaysky Rural Okrug of Tomponsky District in the Sakha Republic, Russia. It is located 90 kilometers (56 mi) from Khandyga, the administrative center of the district. Its population as of the 2002 Census was 1,513. On 6 July 2022, a record high temperature of 37.2 °C (99.0 °F) was recorded.

== Climate ==
Climate data for Krest-Khaldzhay
| Month | Jan | Feb | Mar | Apr | May | Jun | Jul | Aug | Sep | Oct | Nov | Dec | Year |
|---|---|---|---|---|---|---|---|---|---|---|---|---|---|
Source: World Weather Online

== Notable residents ==
- Fyodor Okhlopkov - a Soviet sniper during World War II, credited with 429 kills.
