= Hemidactylus principensis =

Scientific classification
- Kingdom: Animalia
- Phylum: Chordata
- Class: Reptilia
- Order: Squamata
- Suborder: Gekkota
- Family: Gekkonidae
- Genus: Hemidactylus
- Species: H. principensis

Binomial name
- Hemidactylus principensis Miller, Sellas, Drewes, 2012
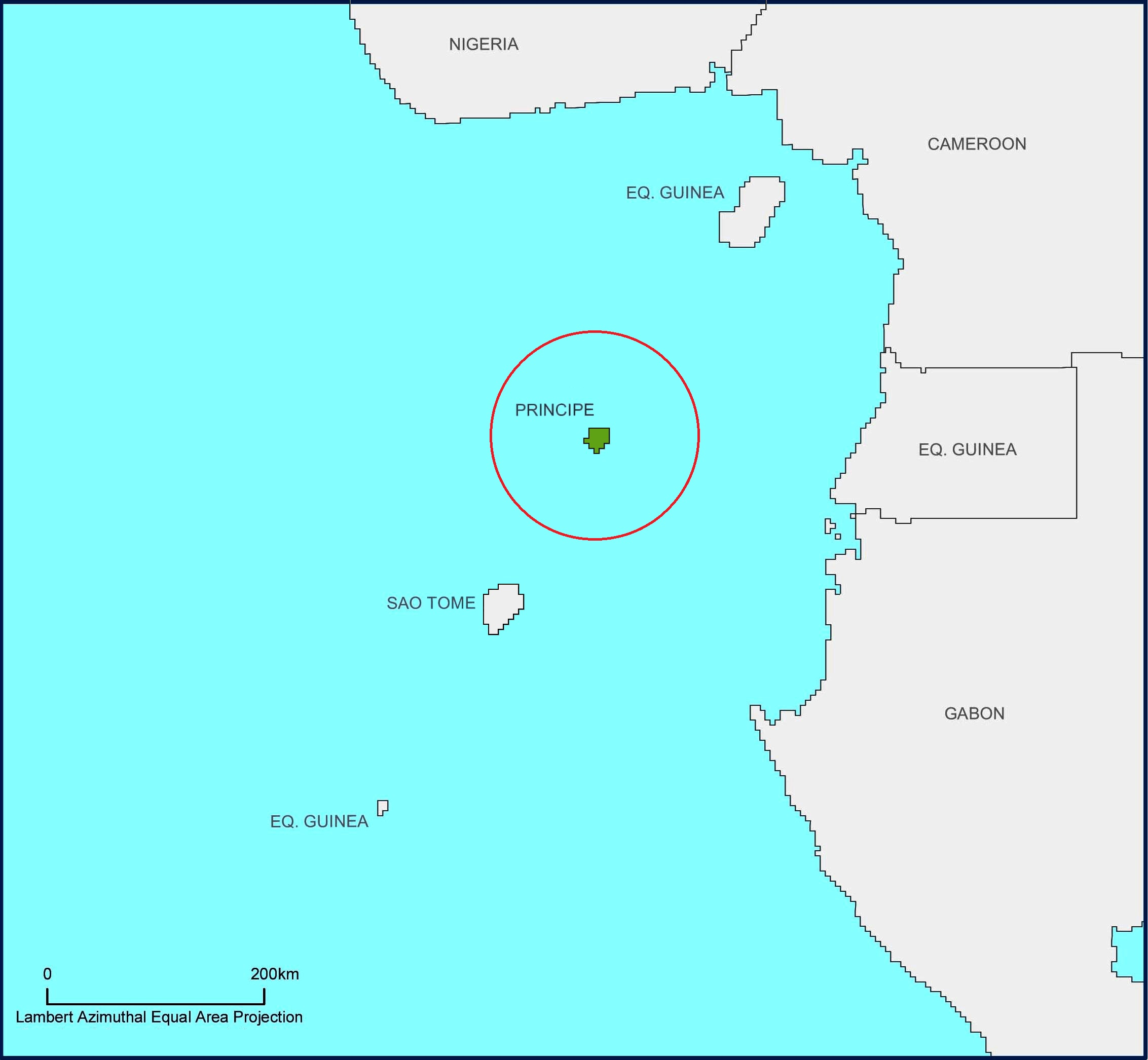
- range

Species of lizard

Hemidactylus principensis is a species of geckos in the family Gekkonidae. The species is endemic to the island of Príncipe in São Tomé and Príncipe. The species was named by Elizabeth C. Miller, Anna B. Sellas and Robert C. Drewes in 2012, when it was split from Hemidactylus greeffii, native to nearby larger island of São Tomé. It was observed on a beach below São Joaquim.
