= Teply Klyuch Airport =

- IATA: KDY; ICAO: UEMH

Summary
- Airport type: Public
- Serves: Khandyga, Tomponsky District, Sakha Republic, Russia
- Elevation AMSL: 282 m / 925 ft
- Coordinates: 62°47′10″N 136°50′32″E

Maps
- Sakha Republic in Russia

- Location of the airport in the Sakha Republic

Runways
Direction	Length		Surface
Direction	m	ft	Surface
01/19	2,500	8,202	Asphalt
- Sources: GCM, STV

Teply Klyuch Airport (Russian: Аэропорт Теплый Ключ) (IATA: KDY, ICAO: UEMH) is an airport serving the urban locality of Khandyga, Tomponsky District, in the Sakha Republic of Russia.

== See also ==
- List of airports in Russia
