= Keskil =

Keskil Кескил
- Selo
- Interactive map of Keskil
- Location of Keskil Keskil (Sakha Republic)
- Coordinates: 62°39′N 135°01′E
- Country: Russia
- Federal subject: Sakha Republic
- Administrative district: Tomponsky District
- Rural okrugSelsoviet: Sasylsky Rural Okrug

Population (2010 Census)
  - Total: 555
  - Estimate (2021): 550 (−0.9%)

Administrative status
  - Capital of: Sasylsky Rural Okrug

Municipal status
  - Municipal district: Tomponsky Municipal District
  - Rural settlement: Sasylsky Rural Settlement
  - Capital of: Sasylsky Rural Settlement
- Time zone: UTC+
- Postal code: 678728
- OKTMO ID: 98650430101

Keskil (Russian: Кескил; Yakut: Саhыл, Sahıl) is a rural locality (a selo), the only inhabited locality, and the administrative center of Sasylsky Rural Okrug in Tomponsky District of the Sakha Republic, Russia, located 40 kilometers (25 mi) from Khandyga, the administrative center of the district. Its population as of the 2010 Census was 555, up from 536 recorded during the 2002 Census.

The name Keskil means future or prospect in the Sakha language. It is also a Sakha first name used by people such as Keskil Baishev.
