= Megino-Aldan =

Megino-Aldan Мегино-Алдан
- Selo
- Interactive map of Megino-Aldan
- Location of Megino-Aldan Megino-Aldan (Sakha Republic)
- Coordinates: 62°41′N 134°38′E
- Country: Russia
- Federal subject: Sakha Republic
- Administrative district: Tomponsky District
- Rural okrugSelsoviet: Megino-Aldansky Rural Okrug

Population (2010 Census)
  - Total: 1,020
  - Estimate (2021): 913 (−10.5%)

Administrative status
  - Capital of: Megino-Aldansky Rural Okrug

Municipal status
  - Municipal district: Tomponsky Municipal District
  - Rural settlement: Megino-Aldansky Rural Settlement
  - Capital of: Megino-Aldansky Rural Settlement
- Time zone: UTC+
- Postal code: 678725
- OKTMO ID: 98650415101

Megino-Aldan (Russian: Мегино-Алдан; Yakut: Мэҥэ Алдан, Meŋe Aldan) is a rural locality (a selo), the only inhabited locality, and the administrative center of Megino-Aldansky Rural Okrug of Tomponsky District in the Sakha Republic, Russia, located 65 kilometers (40 mi) from Khandyga, the administrative center of the district. Its population as of the 2010 Census was 1,020, down from 1,075 recorded during the 2002 Census. It is located by the Aldan, opposite the mouth of the Tompo.
