= Dzhebariki-Khaya =

Dzhebariki-Khaya Джебарики-Хая
- Urban-type settlement

Other transcription(s)
  - Yakut: Дьабарыкы-Хайа
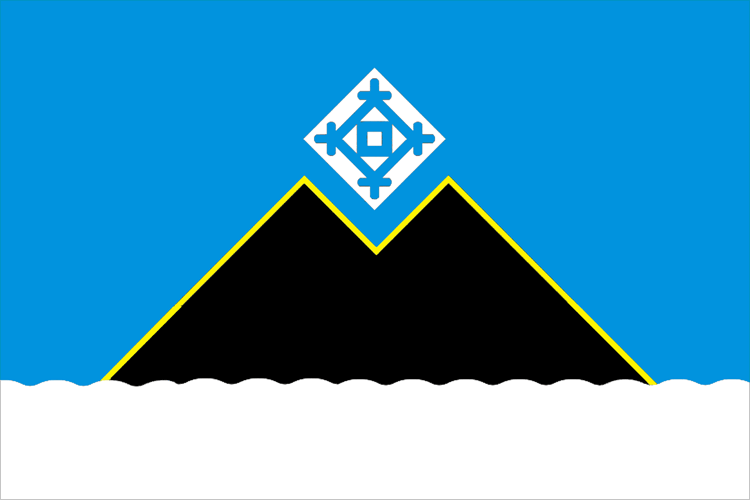
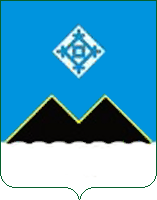
- Flag Coat of arms
- Interactive map of Dzhebariki-Khaya
- Location of Dzhebariki-Khaya Dzhebariki-Khaya (Sakha Republic)
- Coordinates: 62°13′N 135°50′E
- Country: Russia
- Federal subject: Sakha Republic
- Administrative district: Tomponsky District
- SettlementSelsoviet: Dzhebariki-Khaya
- Founded: 1941
- Urban-type settlement status since: 1974

Population (2010 Census)
  - Total: 1,694
  - Estimate (2023): 1,008 (−40.5%)

Administrative status
  - Capital of: Settlement of Dzhebariki-Khaya

Municipal status
  - Municipal district: Tomponsky Municipal District
  - Urban settlement: Dzhebariki-Khaya Urban Settlement
  - Capital of: Dzhebariki-Khaya Urban Settlement
- Time zone: UTC+
- Postal code: 678711
- OKTMO ID: 98650152051
- Website: www.sakha.gov.ru/section/88/settlement/2955

Dzhebariki-Khaya population
- 2010 Census: 1,694
- 2002 Census: 2,125
- 1989 Census: 3,825
- 1979 Census: 3,256

Dzhebariki-Khaya (Russian: Джебарики-Хая; Yakut: Дьабарыкы-Хайа, Cabarıkı Xaya) is an urban locality (an urban-type settlement) in Tomponsky District of the Sakha Republic, Russia, located 60 kilometers (37 mi) from Khandyga, the administrative center of the district. As of the 2010 Census, its population was 1,694.

== History ==
Urban-type settlement status was granted to it in 1974.

== Administrative and municipal status ==
Within the framework of administrative divisions, the urban-type settlement of Dzhebariki-Khaya is incorporated within Tomponsky District as the Settlement of Dzhebariki-Khaya. As a municipal division, the Settlement of Dzhebariki-Khaya is incorporated within Tomponsky Municipal District as Dzhebariki-Khaya Urban Settlement.
