= Aeroporto =

Aeroporto may refer to:

- Aeroporto, Príncipe, a settlement in São Tomé and Príncipe
- Aeroporto (film), directed by Peter Costa; see List of Italian films of 1944

== See also ==
- Aeroporto station (disambiguation)
- Airport (disambiguation)
