= Aeroport, Tomponsky District, Sakha Republic =

Aeroport Аэропорт
- Selo
- Interactive map of Aeroport
- Location of Aeroport Aeroport (Sakha Republic)
- Coordinates: 62°47′09″N 136°49′46″E
- Country: Russia
- Federal subject: Sakha Republic
- Administrative district: Tomponsky District
- Rural okrugSelsoviet: Teploklyuchevsky Rural Okrug

Population
  - Estimate (2002): 243 )

Municipal status
  - Municipal district: Tomponsky Municipal District
  - Rural settlement: Teploklyuchevsky Rural Settlement
- Time zone: UTC+
- Postal code: 678655
- OKTMO ID: 98650433106

Aeroport (Russian: Аэропорт) is a rural locality (a selo), and one of three settlements in Teploklyuchevsky Rural Okrug of Tomponsky District in the Sakha Republic, Russia, in addition to Teplyy Klyuch, the administrative center of the Rural Okrug and Razbilka. It is located 75 kilometers (47 mi) from Khandyga, the administrative center of the district and 2 kilometers (1.2 mi) from Teplyy Klyuch. Its population as of the 2002 Census was 243.
