= Airport (disambiguation) =

An airport is a location where aircraft take off and land. Airport may also refer to:

== Transportation ==
=== Airports ===
- Airport, Pinellas County, FL, St. Pete–Clearwater International Airport, Florida, United States
- Airports, Los Angeles Department of, the airport operations department for the city of Los Angeles, California, United States
- List of airports for all major airports

=== Rail stations ===
- Airport (MARTA station), a rail station in Atlanta, Georgia, United States
- Airport (MBTA station), a rail station in East Boston, Massachusetts, United States
- Airport (Delhi Metro), on the Delhi Airport Express Line of the Delhi Metro
- Airport (OC Transpo), a bus stop in Ottawa, Canada
- Airport (Tyne and Wear Metro), or Newcastle Airport Metro station, a light rail station in Newcastle upon Tyne, England
- Airport (UTA station), a Transit Authority station in Utah, United States

== Places ==
- Airport, California, a census-designated place in Stanislaus County, California, United States
- Airport, Roanoke, Virginia, a neighborhood in Roanoke, Virginia, United States

== Arts, entertainment, and media ==
=== Films ===
- Airport (1953 film), 1953 Spanish comedy directed by Luis Lucia
- Airport (film series), 1970s series of four airplane-themed disaster films
  - Airport (1970 film), a film based on Arthur Hailey's book
  - Airport 1975, sequel to the 1970 film
  - Airport '77, sequel to Airport 1975
  - The Concorde... Airport '79, 1979 sequel to Airport '77
- Airport (1993 film), a 1993 Tamil action film

=== Television ===
- Airport (TV series), a 1996 British reality series
- The Airport, 1992 episode of Seinfeld
- "The Airport" (Outnumbered), a 2008 episode

=== Other arts, entertainment, and media ===
- Airport (Hailey novel), a 1968 novel by Arthur Hailey
- Airport (Loiko novel), a 2015 novel by Sergey Loiko
- Airport (album series), a series of albums by Moka Only, released annually from 2007 to 2012
- "Airport" (song), 1978 single by English band The Motors
- "Airports", the tenth expansion park for the city building game Cities: Skylines

== Other uses ==
- AirPort, a product range and implementation of the IEEE 802.11 ("Wi-Fi") protocol by Apple Inc.

== See also ==
- Aeroport (disambiguation)
