= Terreiro Velho =

- Settlement
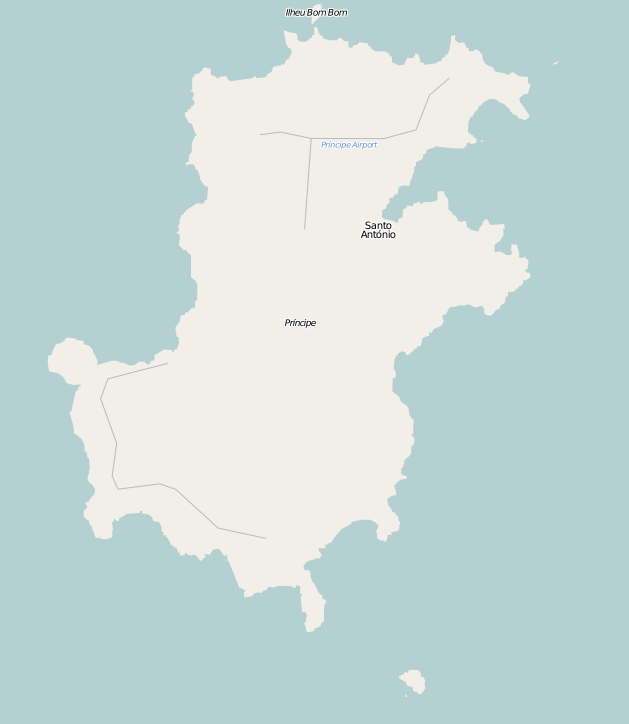
- Location on Príncipe Island
- Coordinates: 1.6115°N 7.4227°E
- Country: São Tomé and Príncipe
- Autonomous Region: Príncipe

Population (2012)
  - Total: 152
- Time zone: UTC+1 (WAT)

Terreiro Velho is a village in the southeastern part of Príncipe Island in São Tomé and Príncipe. Its population is 152 (2012 census). Terreiro Velho lies 3 km south of the island capital of Santo António and 1 km southwest of Nova Estrela. In the mid-1990s, Italian businessman Claudio Corallo bought an abandoned 120 hectares cocoa plantation in Terreiro Velho, and restored it to produce high quality chocolate.

== Population history ==
Historical population
Year	Pop.	±%
2001	69	—
2008	79	+14.5%
2012	152	+92.4%
