= Tompo =

Tompo Томпо
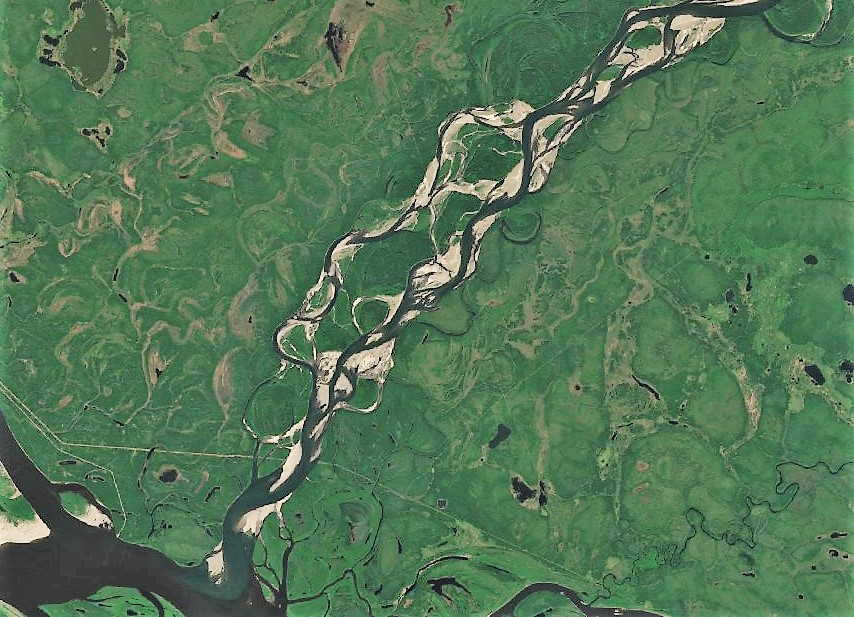
- Confluence of the Tompo and the Aldan Sentinel-2 image

- Mouth location in Yakutia, Russia

Location
- Country: Russian Federation

Physical characteristics
- Source: Elgi Plateau
  - coordinates: 64°29′02″N 139°10′59″E
  - elevation: 1,638 m (5,374 ft)
- Mouth: Aldan River
  - coordinates: 62°42′24″N 134°42′34″E
  - elevation: 106 m (348 ft)
- Length: 570 km (350 mi)
- Basin size: 42,700 km^{2} (16,500 sq mi)
- Discharge
  - average: 158.6 m^{3}/s (5,600 cu ft/s)

Basin features
- Progression: Aldan→ Lena→ Laptev Sea

The Tompo (Russian: Томпо; Yakut: Томпо) is a river in the Sakha Republic (Yakutia), Russia, a right tributary of the Aldan, part of the Lena basin. It has a length of 570 kilometres (350 mi) and a drainage basin area of 42,700 square kilometres (16,500 mi^{2}).

River Tompo gives its name to the Tompo District. It flows across desolate regions, Topolinoye being the only inhabited place in the long course of the river. The Tompo is not navigable.

== Course ==
The Tompo originates in the southern slopes of the Elgi Plateau. For about 400 km (250 mi), the river displays the characteristics of a typical mountain river, flowing within a deep and narrow valley bound by steep slopes.

In its uppermost course the Tompo runs roughly northward along the northern side of the Suntar-Khayata mountains; after roughly 80 km (50 mi) it turns and follows a generally westward direction for about 200 km (120 mi) through the southern part of the Elgi Plateau. Downstream from the mouth of the Delinya, its 2nd largest tributary, which flows from the central part of the Yana-Oymyakon Highlands, the Tompo bends SSE into a roughly 130 km (81 mi) long deep gorge, separating the Verkhoyansk Range proper to the northwest and the group of three parallel ranges formed by the Ulakhan-Bom, Sette-Daban and the Skalisty Range to the southeast. After the mouth of the Menkule River, it emerges from the mountains and, flowing in a southwesterly direction, enters the eastern side of the Central Yakutian Plain, where its valley becomes very wide and swampy, its riverbed dividing into lazily-flowing arms as the speed of the flow decreases. Finally the Tompo meets the right bank of the Aldan River, opposite Megino-Aldan village, upstream of the mouth of the Baray.

=== Tributaries ===
The main tributaries of the Tompo are the 189 km (117 mi) long Khunkhada and 357 km (222 mi) long Delinya from the right, as well as the 225 km (140 mi) long Menkule and 186 km (116 mi) long Tomporuk from the left. There are 1,662 lakes in the basin of the Tompo with a total area of 43.9 km^{2} (16.9 sq mi).

== See also ==
- List of rivers of Russia
- Yana-Oymyakon Highlands§Hydrography
