= Elgi Plateau =

High plain in Far Eastern Russia

- Эльгинское плоскогорье Эльгэ хаптал хайалаах сир
- Location within Sakha Republic

Highest point
- Peak: Tuoydakh Peak
- Elevation: 1,590 m (5,220 ft)

Dimensions
- Area: 30,000 km^{2} (12,000 mi^{2})

Geography
- Country: Russia
- Federal subject: Sakha
- Range coordinates: 64°40′N 139°0′E
- Parent range: Yana-Oymyakon Highlands; East Siberian System

Geology
- Rock age: Proterozoic
- Rock type(s): Sandstone, siltstone

The Elgi Plateau (Russian: Эльгинское плоскогорье; Yakut: Эльгэ хаптал хайалаах сир) is a plateau in the Sakha Republic, Far Eastern Federal District, Russian Federation.

The area is named after the Elgi River, a left tributary of the Indigirka. Formerly there was the Elginsky urban-type settlement by the left bank of river Elgi. It belonged to the Oymyakon District and was abolished in 2007.

== Geography ==
The Elgi Plateau covers the central Yana-Oymyakon Highlands, in the upper Elgi, Tompo and Delinya basins. The plateau is bound by the Verkhoyansk Range to the west and the Chersky Range to the northeast, the Yana Plateau to the northwest, the Suntar-Khayata Range to the southwest and the Oymyakon Plateau to the southeast.

The average height of the plateau surface is between 1,200 meters (3,900 ft) and 1,400 meters (4,600 ft). Dome-shaped peaks rise between the interfluves, where there are areas of small lakes and moorland. The highest point of the Elgi Plateau is 1,590 metres (5,220 ft) high Tuoydakh Peak.

== Flora ==
Forests of larch taiga generally cover the flat areas and lower slopes, and in the higher elevations Siberian pine, giving way to alpine tundra in the mountaintops. Willows and poplars may grow in the floodplains of the intermontane basins.
