= Fyodor Okhlopkov =

Soviet sniper (1908–1968)

- Born: 3 March 1908; Krest-Khaldzhay, Russian Empire
- Died: 28 May 1968 (aged 60); Krest-Khaldzhay, Yakut ASSR, Russian SFSR, Soviet Union
- Military career
- Allegiance: Soviet Union
- Branch: Infantry
- Service years: 1941–1945
- Rank: Sergeant
- Unit: 234th Infantry Regiment
- Conflicts: World War II
- Awards: Hero of the Soviet Union

Fyodor Matveyevich Okhlopkov (Russian: Фёдор Матве́евич Охло́пков, Yakut: Маппыай уола Сүөдэр Охлопков, romanized: Mappyay uola Süöder Okhlopkov; 3 March 1908 – 28 May 1968) was a Soviet sniper during World War II credited with 429 kills. Nominated for the title Hero of the Soviet Union in 1944 after tallying his first 420 sniper kills but rejected for unclear reasons, he was belatedly awarded the title in May 1965 over twenty years later to coincide with the anniversary of Victory Day. He is considered as one of the deadliest snipers in history.

== Early life ==
Okhlopkov was born on 3 March 1908 to a Yakut peasant family in Krest-Khaldzhay. Having only a primary education and being orphaned at the age of twelve, he held down a variety of jobs from a young age to support his family, working as a hauler in a mine and later as a machine operator on a collective farm. When he was not working he attended sharpshooting training with Osoaviakhim, earning a "Voroshilov shooter" badge for his accuracy; he had been a member of the Komsomol since 1929.

== World War II ==
Upon being drafted into the Red Army in September 1941, he was posted as a machine gunner in the 1243rd Infantry Regiment of the 375th Infantry Division, which was composed mostly of Siberians and included his brother Vasily, who was killed in action in January 1942. Before becoming a sniper, Okhlopkov had become commander of a squad of machine gunners.

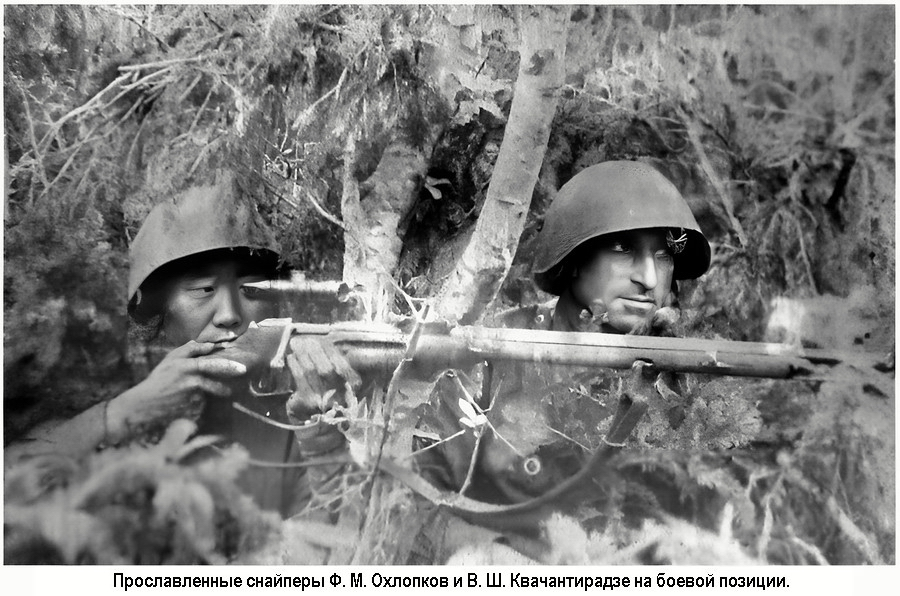
Snipers Fyodor Okhlopkov and Vaso Kvachantiradze in combat position

By October 1942, less than a year after arriving at the warfront in December 1941, Fyodor was sent to the 234th Infantry Regiment where he was made a sniper owing to his background as a skilled marksman; earlier in August he had been wounded in combat for a fourth time, with the extent of his injuries requiring him to be evacuated to a hospital in Ivanovo. That month his division lost nearly 80% of its personnel to enemy attacks. Upon returning to the front lines as a sniper, he quickly increased his tally of kills, for which he was awarded a variety of medals. Renowned among his colleagues for his accurate marksmanship, he rarely had to fire more than one shot to hit his target. He engaged in prolonged duels against enemy snipers, waiting for them to give up their position before firing one shot at their position; in addition to sniper activities he learned to fire an anti-tank rifle and participated in reconnaissance missions behind enemy lines.

On 7 June 1944, he was nominated for the title Hero of the Soviet Union for having killed 420 enemy soldiers, but the nomination was later downgraded to the Order of the Red Banner instead. Later that month on 23 June 1944, he sustained a severe chest wound during intense fighting for Belorussia; it was the twelfth time he was wounded in battle. After being airlifted to a medical unit he was sent to recover in a hospital behind the front lines, but the extent of the injury left him unfit for military service until spring 1945, shortly before the end of the war. His official sniper tally at the end of the war was 429 enemy soldiers killed, not counting an additional 27 enemy soldiers that he took out with his machine gun.

== Postwar ==
After marching in the Moscow Victory Day parade on 24 June 1945 he was subsequently demobilized from the military. Upon return to his hometown he was enthusiastically greeted by his countrymen, although many of his colleagues were left wondering why he was not awarded the Gold Star considering his sniper tally. From then to 1949 he headed the military department of the Tattinsky District Communist Party committee, in addition to becoming a member of the Council of Nationalities of the Supreme Soviet in 1946. From 1949 to 1951, he was director of the Tattinsky office for the procurement of furs, and from then to 1954, he was manager of the Tattinsky district office of the Yakutsk meat trust. From 1954 until he retired in 1960, he worked on a collective farm. On 6 May 1965 he was belatedly awarded the title Hero of the Soviet Union and the Order of Lenin, but he died just a few years later on 28 May 1968. He and his wife Anna, awarded Mother Heroine, had ten children.

== Awards ==
- Hero of the Soviet Union (6 May 1965)
- Order of Lenin (6 May 1965)
- Order of the Red Banner (26 July 1944)
- Order of the Patriotic War 2nd class (17 October 1943)
- Two Order of the Red Star (27 August 1942 and 4 December 1942)
- Medal "For Courage" (18 July 1944)
- Campaign and jubilee medals
