= Topolinoye =

Topolinoye Тополиное
- Selo
- Interactive map of Topolinoye
- Location of Topolinoye Topolinoye (Sakha Republic)
- Coordinates: 64°04′24″N 135°58′29″E
- Country: Russia
- Federal subject: Sakha Republic
- Administrative district: Tomponsky District
- Rural okrugSelsoviet: Tomponsky National Rural Okrug

Population (2010 Census)
  - Total: 915
  - Estimate (2021): 929 (+1.5%)

Administrative status
  - Capital of: Tomponsky National Rural Okrug

Municipal status
  - Municipal district: Tomponsky Municipal District
  - Rural settlement: Tomponsky National Rural Settlement
  - Capital of: Tomponsky National Rural Settlement
- Time zone: UTC+
- Postal code: 678723
- OKTMO ID: 98650435101

Topolinoye (Russian: Тополиное) is a rural locality (a selo), the only inhabited locality, and the administrative center of Tomponsky National Rural Okrug of the Tompo District in the Sakha Republic, Russia. It is located on the left bank of the Tompo River, 294 kilometers (183 mi) from Khandyga, the administrative center of the district. Its population as of the 2010 Census was 915, of whom 458 were male and 457 female, up from 880 as recorded during the 2002 Census.
