= Belo Monte, São Tomé and Príncipe =

Settlement on the island of Principe

Belo Monte
- Former plantation currently nature resort
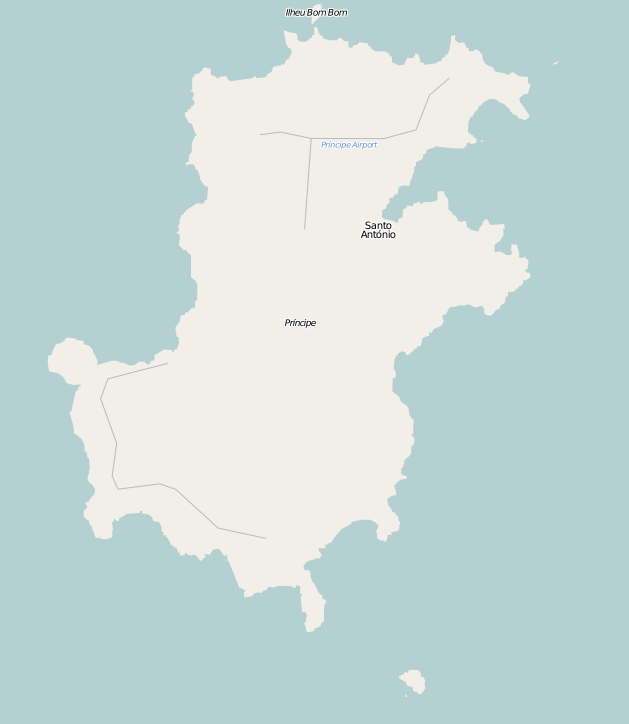
- Location on Príncipe Island
- Coordinates: 1.6846°N 7.4431°E
- Country: São Tomé and Príncipe
- Autonomous Region: Príncipe

Population (2012)
  - Total: 75
- Time zone: UTC+1 (WAT)

Belo Monte is the name of a former cacao plantation (1922) in the northeastern part of Príncipe Island in São Tomé and Príncipe. It has been recently restored and is currently operated as a nature resort. The population of the nearby village, constructed for the plantation personnel, is 75 (2012 census). The settlement is located northeast of the island capital Santo António and Picão. The plantation grounds include Praia Banana, one of the iconic beaches of Principe.

== Population history ==
Historical population
Year	Pop.	±%
2001	97	—
2008	111	+14.4%
2012	75	−32.4%
