= Autonomous Region of Príncipe =

Subdivision of São Tomé and Príncipe

Autonomous Region of Príncipe Região Autónoma do Príncipe
- Autonomous Region
- Flag

- Map of São Tomé and Príncipe highlighting Príncipe Region near the top right corner
- Coordinates: 1°37′N 7°24′E
- Country: São Tomé and Príncipe
- Capital: Santo António

Area
  - Total: 142 km^{2} (55 sq mi)
- Elevation: 947 m (3,107 ft)

Population (2018)
  - Total: 8,420
  - Density: 59.3/km^{2} (154/sq mi)
- Time zone: UTC+0
- ISO 3166 code: ST-P

The Autonomous Region of Príncipe (Portuguese: Região Autónoma do Príncipe) is an autonomous administrative division of the Republic of São Tomé and Príncipe. Established on 29 April 1995, it covers the island of Príncipe and a number of small uninhabited islands around it, with an area of 142 km^{2} (55 sq mi) in total. As defined by the constitution of São Tomé and Príncipe, the Autonomous Region of Príncipe has a Regional Assembly and a Regional Government. Its population was 7,324 at the 2012 census; the latest official estimate was 8,420. It is coextensive with and consists of a single district: Pagué. Its seat is the town Santo António.

== Islands ==
The main island of the autonomous region is Príncipe. Smaller offshore islets are:

- Ilhéu Bom Bom
- Ilhéu Caroço
- Tinhosa Grande
- Tinhosa Pequena

== History ==
In 1995, a few years after the country's democratic transition, Príncipe became an autonomous region. The island's first regional government was elected in the same year. The central government's failure to hold any local election in the years thereafter caused another popular protest in June 2006 that forced Príncipe's regional government to step down.

== Population ==
Population of Pagué District/Autonomous Region of Príncipe (1940—2012)
Year	Population
1940	3,144
1950	4,390
1960	4,563
1970	4,576
1981	5,255
1991	5,471
2001	5,966
2012	7,324

== Settlements ==
Pagué District, ARP

The main settlement is the town of Santo António. Other settlements are:

- Aeroporto
- Belo Monte
- Bom Viver
- Hospital Velho
- Ilhéu Bom Bom
- Nova Estrela
- Picão
- Portinho
- Porto Real
- Praia Inhame
- Santa Rita
- São Joaquim
- Sundy (or Sundi)
- Terreiro Velho

== Notable persons ==
- Damião Vaz d'Almeida, a former president of the regional government of Príncipe from 1995 to 2002, and subsequently a prime minister of São Tomé and Príncipe from 2004 to 2005.

== See also ==
- List of presidents of the Regional Government of Príncipe
