= Aviaport =

Aviaport (Russian: Авиапорт) is the name of several rural localities in the Sakha Republic, Russia:

- Aviaport, Kobyaysky District, Sakha Republic, a selo under the administrative jurisdiction of the Settlement of Sangar in Kobyaysky District
- Aviaport, Olyokminsky District, Sakha Republic, a selo under the administrative jurisdiction of the Town of Olyokminsk in Olyokminsky District

== See also ==
- Aeroport (disambiguation)
