= Maksym Shapoval =

Ukrainian military intelligence officer (1978–2017)

Colonel Maksym Shapoval
- Максим Шаповал
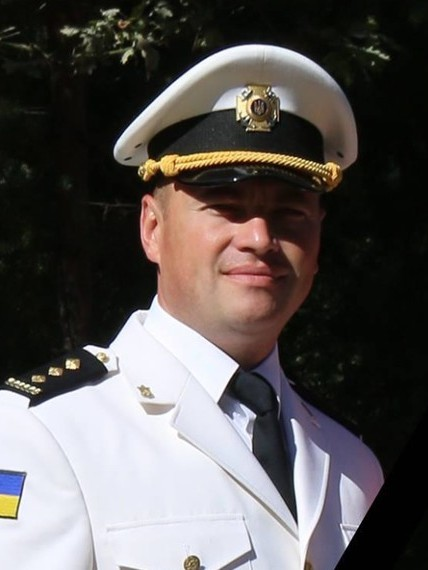
- Shapoval in 2015
- Born: 6 July 1978; Vinnytsia, Ukrainian SSR, Soviet Union
- Died: 27 June 2017 (aged 38); Kyiv, Ukraine
- Spouse: Iryna Shapoval
- Children: 2
- Military career
- Allegiance: Ukraine
- Branch: Chief Directorate of Intelligence of the Ministry of Defence of Ukraine
- Rank: Colonel
- Commands: Chief of HUR MOU 10th Special Detachment
- Conflicts: Russo-Ukrainian war; War in Donbas; Siege of Sloviansk; First Battle of Donetsk Airport
- Awards: Order of the Gold Star (posthumously)

Maksym Mykhailovych Shapoval (Ukrainian: Максим Михайлович Шаповал; 6 July 1978 – 27 June 2017) was a senior officer (Colonel) in the Ukrainian military and head of the special forces of the Chief Intelligence Directorate. He was assassinated in a car bomb attack in central Kyiv on 27 June 2017, having only recently returned from the conflict zone in eastern Ukraine. At the time of his death, Shapoval was investigating Russian involvement in Eastern Ukraine. He collected intel on their locations and weapons, which was able to substantiate Ukraine's position in the war criminal trial in The Hague on Russia's armed aggression.

== Early life ==
Maksym Shapoval was born in Vyshenka district of Vinnytsia in a civilian pilot's house, and was an only child. Maksym's father, Mykhailo, commander of the AN-2 aircraft crew, worked at the Vinnytsia Airport, where he died in 1985 aged 33 y.o.

Maksym Shapoval graduated from the military academy, choosing a military career like his grandfather, Leonid. His uncle also served in the armed forces in Kyiv, retiring with the rank of colonel. Shapoval joined the Kyiv Higher Engineering Radio Engineering College of Air Defense, and in 1999 became a member of the newly established Military Institute of NTUU "KPI", the Faculty of Encryptors, and graduated in 2000.

== Military career ==
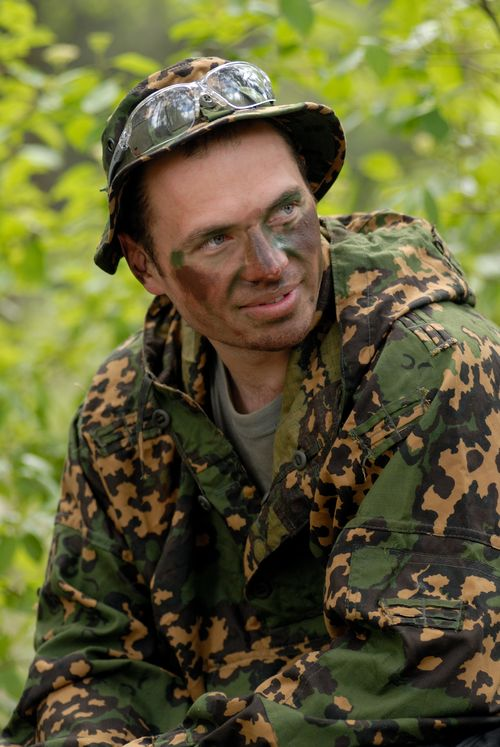
Shapoval in 2008

Shapoval began his military service as an officer in the Encrypted Communications and Security Mode of the Defense Intelligence of the Ministry of Defense of Ukraine. He also participated in a peacekeeping mission in Sierra Leone. Upon his return he served as a senior officer, commander of a group of scuba divers. In 2010–2012, he served in the Department of State Protection for the Protection of the First Person of the State. After UDO, he returned to his position as Chief of the Instructor Service and was subsequently appointed Deputy Commander of the Military Unit then made the Commander of the Military Unit.

== Involvement in the War of Donbas ==
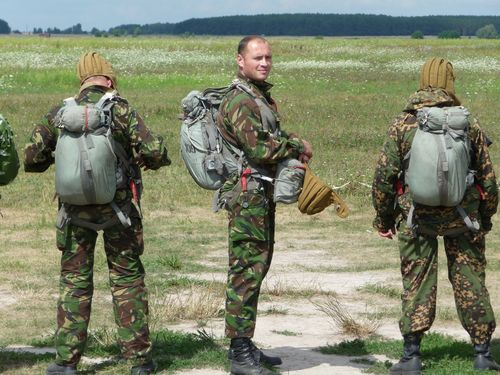
Shapoval with his special forces unit team in 2009

Shapoval served 3 years leading special operations forces in combat missions in Eastern Ukraine, as commander of the 10th Special Detachment of the Main Directorate of Intelligence of the Ministry of Defense of Ukraine. The "ten" unit has the unofficial name of "Island", based on Rybalsky Island. Shapoval was the commander of a special appointment group, which in May 2014 retook Donetsk airport from pro-Russian separatists.

He was directly involved in the planning and conducting of reconnaissance raids into the enemy's deep rear, using the means of documenting the presence of Russian occupying troops, their movements, the availability of up-to-date models of EW systems and means of destruction. Including in such a way that it could serve as an absolute proof of Russia's armed aggression against Ukraine, especially in the use of full-fledged BTRGs and the latest defeat systems, which are produced only in Russia. Some intelligence operations concerned timely notification of the deployment of Russian artillery, including long-range artillery, which significantly reduced casualties among Ukrainian military and civilians. Shapoval also served as a frontline special forces commander early on in the Siege of Sloviansk in which the pro-Russian insurgents were eventually pushed out of the city of Sloviansk after nearly three months of fighting in July 2014.

According to Ukrainian intelligence, on 7 June 2017, Shapoval's unit liquidated one senior officer, Colonel Cherkashin Yuri Mikhailovich of the FSB special forces unit Vympel in the occupied territory of Donbas who was responsible for organising terrorist acts on Ukraine.

== Assassination ==
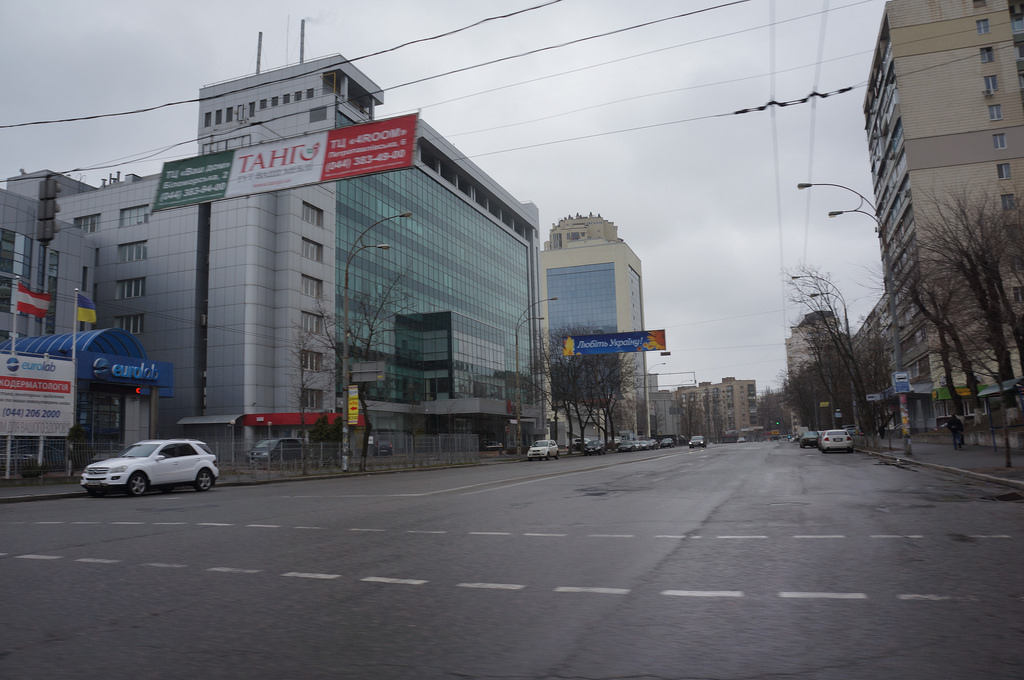
Crossing of Solomianska and Mekhanizatoriv (now General Shapoval) streets in Kyiv, near the site where the assassination took place

On 27 June 2017, Shapoval was assassinated in a car bomb attack in central Kyiv. At 8:16 (UTC) the Mercedes Benz vehicle he was driving exploded in a detonation from a bomb planted underneath the vehicle, killing him instantly and wounding two bystanders: a female passerby with shrapnel wounds to her leg and a 71-year-old man with wounds to his neck. Kyiv police have branded the incident a "terrorist attack"; Russian intelligence is suspected to be behind the car bomb.

On the same day a similar car bomb explosion in Kostiantynivka, Donetsk Oblast killed another colonel and wounded three more officers of the Security Service of Ukraine. Colonel Yuri Vozny, head of the counterintelligence department, was killed as a result. Russian intelligence was also blamed for the attack.

A short time after the assassination, a cyberattack was launched. Former government adviser in Georgia and Moldova Molly K. McKew believed Shapoval's assassination was related with this cyberattack. She also stated that Shapoval was a "huge asset" to Ukraine's security.

Shapoval is survived by his wife, Iryna, a five-year-old daughter and a two-year-old son at the time of his death.

== Investigation and aftermath ==
On 17 April 2019, Head of SBU Vasyl Hrytsak announced the name of the saboteur who laid the blast; Oleg Shutov, who was a resident of Donetsk, an employee of the so-called "DPR Ministry of Civil Defense" Special Operations Center. Shutov rented an apartment in the same house where Shapoval lived. After the attack, he left for Donetsk.

Ukraine held the chief of the counter-intelligence operations department of the FSB of the Russian Federation Lieutenant-General Dmitry Minaev, personally responsible for ordering the assassinations of both Col. Shapoval and another special service operative Col. Oleksandr Kharaberyush of the SBU back on 31 March 2017. He was present at the time in the Donbas in the so-called center of special operations of the "DPR Ministry of Civil Defense" during the explosions of Kharaberyush and Shapoval's cars.

On 27 July 2026, Oleg Shutov was killed by an explosion in occupied Donetsk. He was accused of killing HUR Colonel Maksym Shapoval in 2017.

== Awards ==
- Promoted to the rank of Major general posthumously on 30 June 2017.
- Awarded posthumously with the “Golden Star” Order of Hero of Ukraine on 7 September 2017.

== See also ==
- Denis Voronenkov
- List of unsolved murders (2000–present)
- Pavel Sheremet
