= Teryut =

Teryut Терют
- Selo
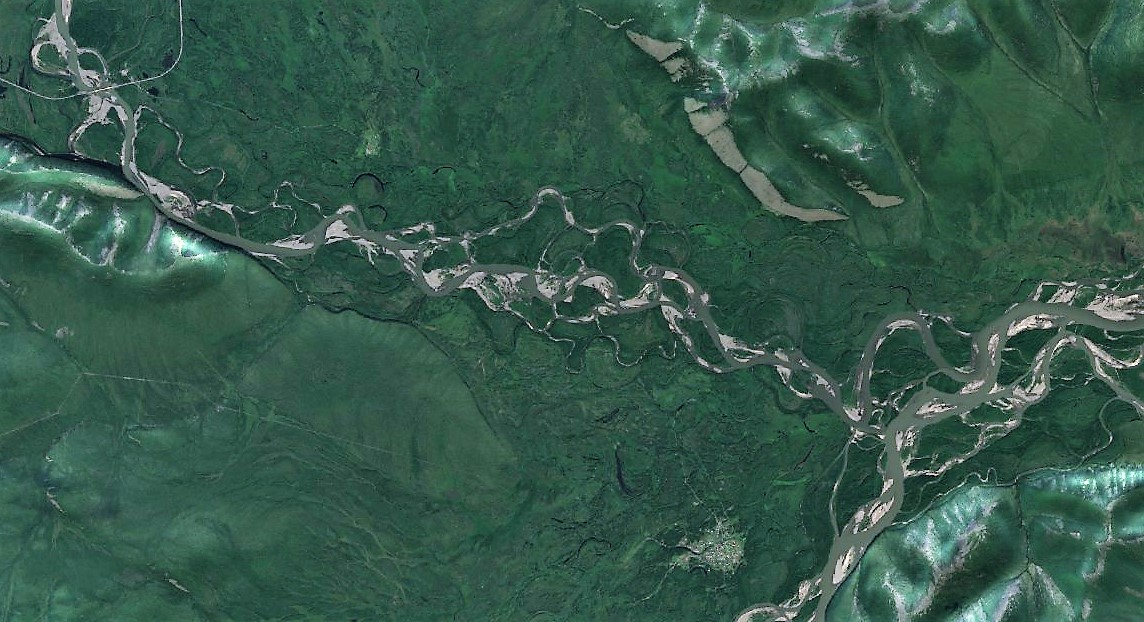
- Interactive map of Teryut
- Location of Teryut Teryut (Sakha Republic)
- Coordinates: 64°14′42″N 142°04′46″E
- Country: Russia
- Federal subject: Sakha Republic
- Administrative district: Oymyakonsky District
- Rural okrugSelsoviet: Teryutsky Rural Okrug
- Elevation: 564 m (1,850 ft)

Population (2010 Census)
  - Total: 355
  - Estimate (2021): 340 (−4.2%)

Administrative status
  - Capital of: Teryutsky Rural Okrug

Municipal status
  - Municipal district: Oymyakonsky Municipal District
  - Rural settlement: Teryutsky Rural Settlement
  - Capital of: Teryutsky Rural Settlement
- Time zone: UTC+
- Postal code: 678743
- OKTMO ID: 98639432101

Teryut (Russian: Терют; Yakut: Төрүт, Törüt) is a rural locality (a selo), the only inhabited locality, and the administrative center of Teryutsky Rural Okrug of Oymyakonsky District in the Sakha Republic, Russia, located 120 kilometers (75 mi) from Ust-Nera, the administrative center of the district. Its population as of the 2010 Census was 355, of whom 164 were male and 158 female, down from 411 as recorded during the 2002 Census.

== Geography ==
Teryut is located 2 km (1.2 mi) to the southwest of the confluence of the Elgi and the Indigirka.
