= Hospital Velho =

- Settlement
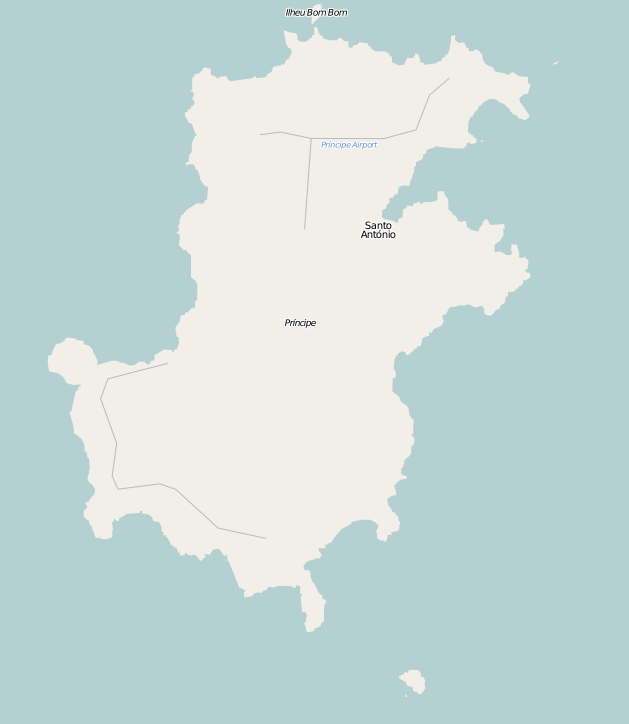
- Location on Príncipe Island
- Coordinates: 1.6435°N 7.4292°E
- Country: São Tomé and Príncipe
- Autonomous Region: Príncipe

Population (2012)
  - Total: 335
- Time zone: UTC+1 (WAT)

Hospital Velho is a settlement in the eastern part of Príncipe Island in São Tomé and Príncipe. It lies east of the island capital Santo António, on the coast. Its population is 335 (2012 census).

== Population history ==
Historical population
Year	Pop.	±%
2001	252	—
2008	287	+13.9%
2012	335	+16.7%
