= Saydy, Tomponsky District, Sakha Republic =

Saydy Сайды
- Selo
- Interactive map of Saydy
- Location of Saydy Saydy (Sakha Republic)
- Coordinates: 62°36′22″N 135°27′36″E
- Country: Russia
- Federal subject: Sakha Republic
- Administrative district: Tomponsky District
- Rural okrugSelsoviet: Ynginsky Rural Okrug

Population
  - Estimate (2002): 177 )

Municipal status
  - Municipal district: Tomponsky Municipal District
  - Rural settlement: Ynginsky Rural Settlement
- Time zone: UTC+
- Postal code: 678726
- OKTMO ID: 98650440106

Saydy (Russian: Сайды; Yakut: Сайдыы, Saydıı) is a rural locality (a selo), and one of two settlements in the Ynginsky Rural Okrug of the omponsky District in the Sakha Republic, Russia, along with Novy, the administrative center of the Rural Okrug. It is located 11 kilometers (6.8 mi) from Khandyga, the administrative center of the district and 3 kilometers (1.9 mi) from Novyy. Its population as of the 2002 Census was 177.
