= Ary-Tolon =

Ary-Tolon Ары-Толон
- Selo
- Interactive map of Ary-Tolon
- Location of Ary-Tolon Ary-Tolon (Sakha Republic)
- Coordinates: 62°51′N 134°18′E
- Country: Russia
- Federal subject: Sakha Republic
- Administrative district: Tomponsky District
- Rural okrugSelsoviet: Bayagantaysky Rural Okrug

Population
  - Estimate (2021): 167 )

Municipal status
  - Municipal district: Tomponsky Municipal District
  - Rural settlement: Bayagantaysky Rural Settlement
- Time zone: UTC+
- Postal code: 678724
- OKTMO ID: 98650405106

Ary-Tolon (Russian: Ары-Толон; Yakut: Арыы Толоон, Arıı Toloon) is a rural locality (a selo) in Bayagantaysky Rural Okrug of Tomponsky District in the Sakha Republic, Russia, located 102 kilometers (63 mi) from Khandyga, the administrative center of the district and 12 kilometers (7.5 mi) from Krest-Khaldzhay, the administrative center of the rural okrug. Its population as of the 2002 Census was 172.
