= Elgi =

River in Yakutia, Russia

Elgi Эльги / Эльгэ
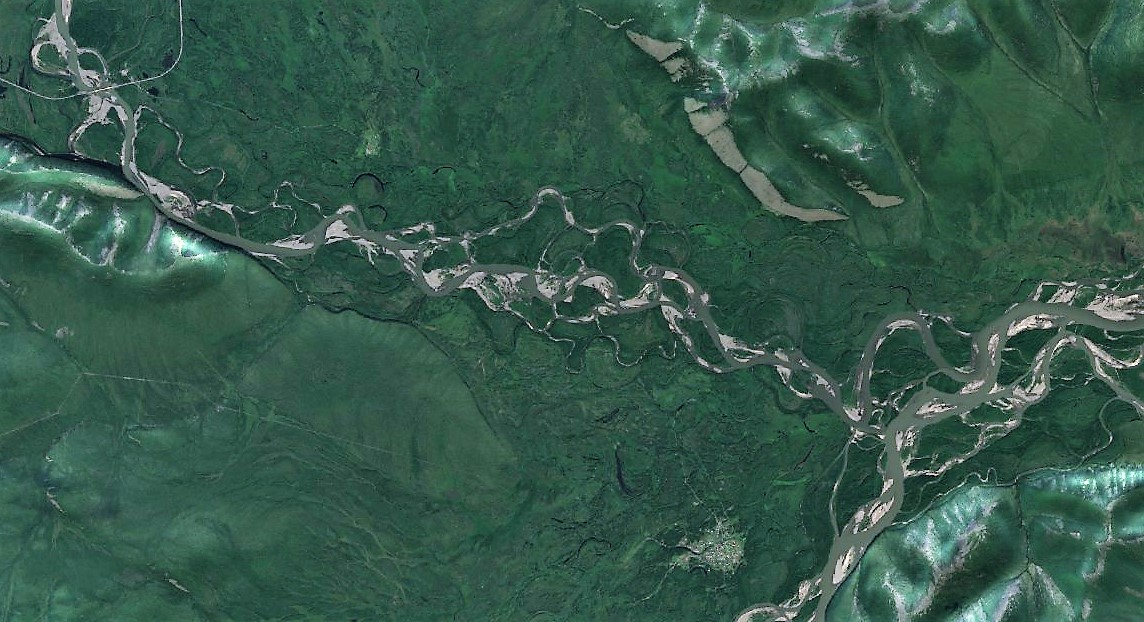
- Confluence of the Elgi and the Indigirka Sentinel-2 image

Location
- Country: Russia

Physical characteristics
- Source: Degdega and Kao confluence
  - coordinates: 64°19′02″N 138°45′20″E
  - elevation: ca 1,100 m (3,600 ft)
- Mouth: Indigirka
  - location: SW of Ust-Nera
  - coordinates: 64°16′16″N 142°10′03″E
  - elevation: 550 m (1,800 ft)
- Length: 394 km (245 mi)
- Basin size: 68,200 km^{2} (26,300 sq mi)

Basin features
- Progression: Indigirka→ East Siberian Sea

The Elgi (Russian: Эльги; Yakut: Эльгэ) is a river in Yakutia in Russia, a left tributary of the Indigirka. The Elgi Plateau is named after the Elgi River. The river's length is 394 km (245 mi) and its drainage basin 68,200 square kilometres (26,300 mi^{2}).

Teryut village is located close to the confluence of the Elgi and the Indigirka. Formerly there was a settlement called Elginsky on the left bank of the Elgi, about 40 kilometres (25 mi) upstream from the confluence. It belonged to the Oymyakon District and was abolished in 2007.

== Course ==
The Elgi is formed by the confluence of the Degdega and Kao rivers. It flows across the Elgi Plateau in a wide arch, first approximately westwards and then roughly eastwards. After 394 kilometres (245 mi) it meets the left bank of the upper Indigirka, about 70 kilometres (43 mi) upstream from Ust-Nera.

The Elgi freezes up in the second half of October and remains icebound until late May through early June.

=== Tributaries ===
The main tributaries of the Elgi are the 108 km (67 mi) long Tobychan and the 150 km (93 mi) long Utachan on the left, as well as the 140 km (87 mi) long Ulakhan Selerikan (Улахан Сэлэрикээн) and the 125 km (78 mi) long Ayaaba (Айааба) on the right. The river freezes before mid October and stays frozen until mid May. There are an estimated 3,700 lakes in the river basin.

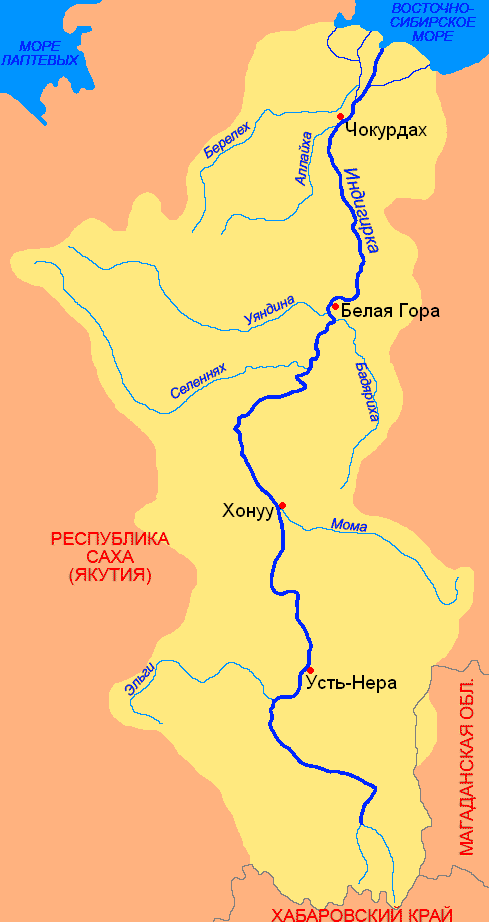
Indigirka basin with the Elgi in the lower left

== See also ==
- List of rivers of Russia
- Yana-Oymyakon Highlands§Hydrography
