= ISO 3166-2:ST =

Entry for São Tomé and Príncipe in ISO 3166-2

ISO 3166-2:ST is the entry for São Tomé and Príncipe (written without diacritics in the standard) in ISO 3166-2, part of the ISO 3166 standard published by the International Organization for Standardization (ISO), which defines codes for the names of the principal subdivisions (e.g., provinces or states) of all countries coded in ISO 3166-1.

Currently for São Tomé and Príncipe, ISO 3166-2 codes are defined for one autonomous region and six districts. Each code consists of two parts separated by a hyphen. The first part is ST, the ISO 3166-1 alpha-2 code of São Tomé and Príncipe. The second part is a letter for an autonomous region or two digits for a district.

== Current codes ==
Subdivision names are listed as in the ISO 3166-2 standard published by the ISO 3166 Maintenance Agency (ISO 3166/MA).

Code	Subdivision name (pt)	Subdivision category
ST-01	Água Grande	district
ST-02	Cantagalo	district
ST-03	Caué	district
ST-04	Lembá	district
ST-05	Lobata	district
ST-06	Mé-Zóchi	district
ST-P	Príncipe	autonomous region

== Changes ==
The following changes to the entry have been announced by the ISO 3166/MA since the first publication of ISO 3166-2 in 1998:

Effective date	Short description of change
2020-11-24	Deletion of province ST-S; Change of subdivision category from province to autonomous region for ST-P; Addition of district ST-01, ST-02, ST-03, ST-04, ST-05, ST-06; Update List Source

== See also ==
- Subdivisions of São Tomé and Príncipe
- FIPS region codes of São Tomé and Príncipe
