= Sergey Loiko =

Sergey L. Loiko
- Сергей Леонидович Лойко
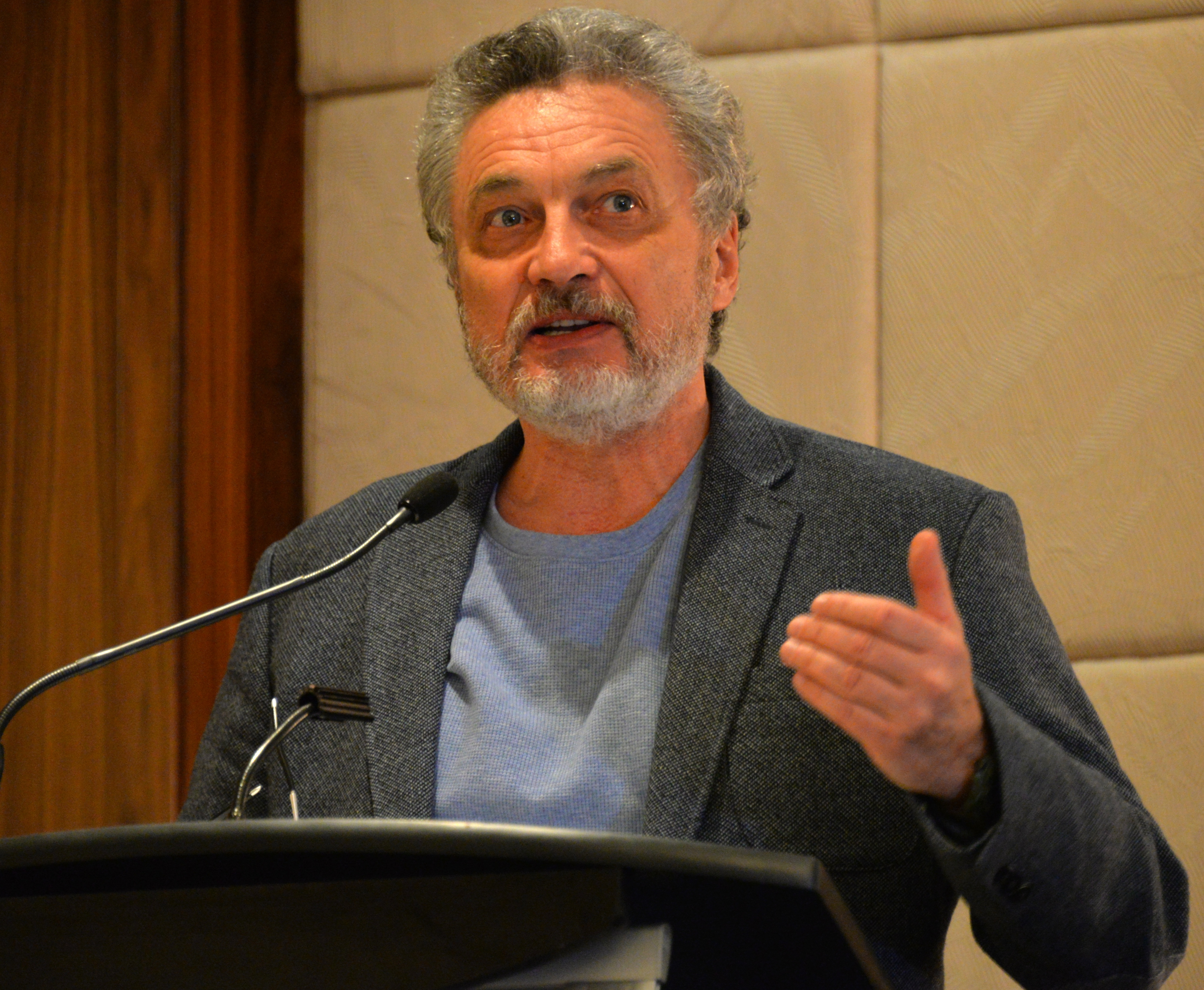
- Born: 26 February 1953 (age 73); Mikkeli, Southern Savonia, Finland
- Citizenship: Soviet Union → Russia
- Education: Moscow State University
- Occupations: Writer, War photographer, journalist

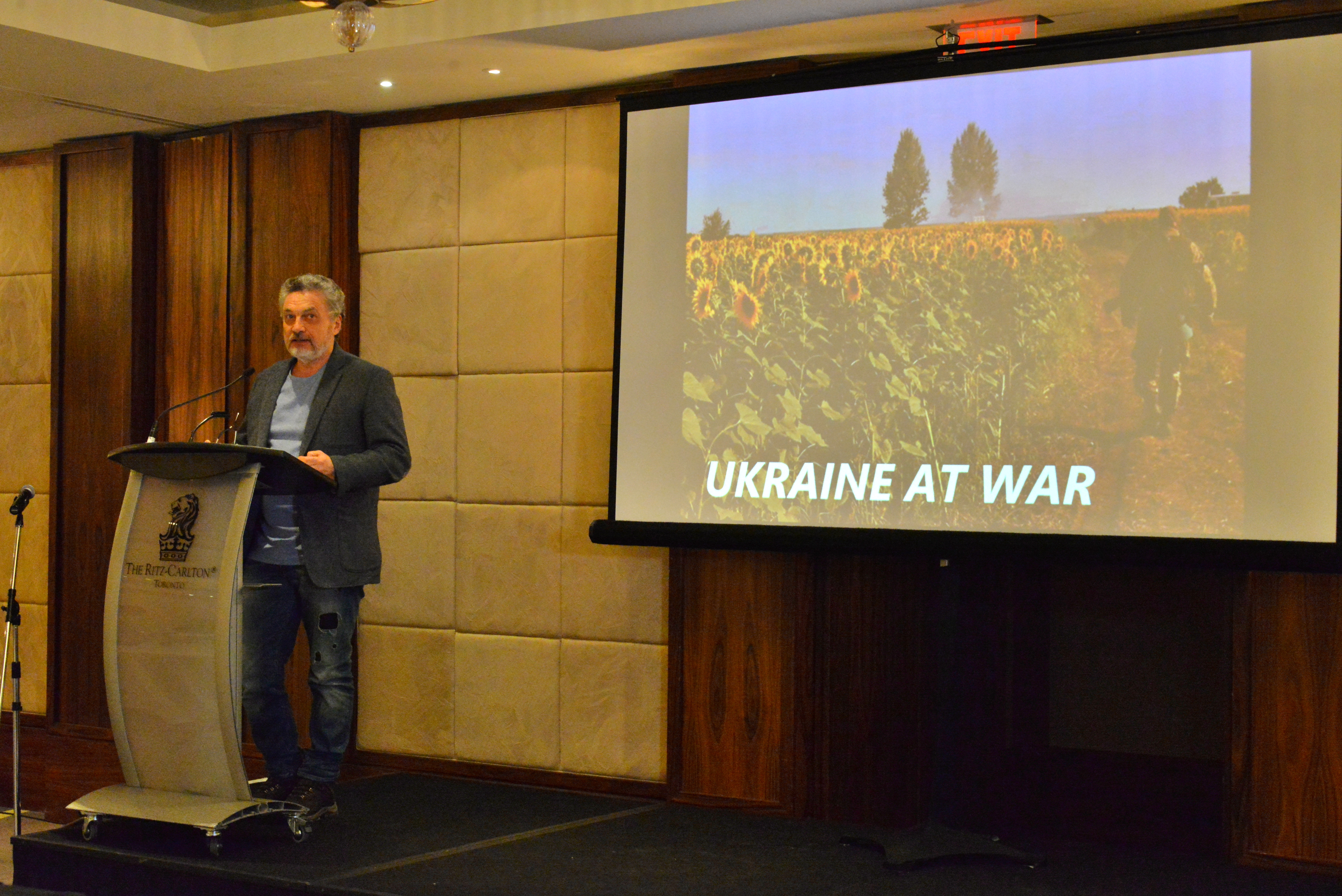
Toronto Book Presentation

Sergey Leonidovich Loiko (Russian: Сергей Леонидович Лойко, born 26 February 1953 in Moscow USSR, is a writer, war photographer, and journalist. As a journalist and photographer he has covered armed conflicts in Russia and the former USSR since 1991 (Romania, Tajikistan, Chechnya, Georgia) working primarily for the Los Angeles Times. In 2001, Loiko covered the war in Afghanistan and in 2003, the war in Iraq.

In 2004, he published his first book Shock and Awe, War in Iraq. In 2015, he published Airport a book about the battle of Donetsk airport. In 2017, Loiko published Flight about the shooting down of MH17.

Loiko was awarded with the 2014 Overseas Press Club’s Bob Considine Award and the 2015 Los Angeles Times Editorial Award. His novels Airport (ru: "Аэропорт", 2015; American award Overseas Press Club Bob Considine award) and Flight (ru: "Рейс", 2017) are translated into many languages.

Loiko has been working as a war reporter in Ukraine since 2014. In 2024 the Investigative Committee of Russia put Loiko on a wanted list allegedly for high treason.

== Journalistic activity in military zones ==
=== The War in Iraq (2003-2011) ===
During the Iraq war, Sergei Loiko became one of the most prominent journalists to describe Operation Shock and Shake. His reports for Novaya Gazeta, of which he was a correspondent, were published in the Los Angeles Times, aired on Echo of Moscow, and reprinted in other world publications. Materials from his reports and diary were included in the book "Shock and awe. The War in Iraq ”Novaya Gazeta nominated Serhiy Loyko for the 2003 Union of Journalists of Russia.

=== Russian-Ukrainian War (2014 ‒) ===
As a military journalist, photographer and writer, he has been covering the war in eastern Ukraine since 2014. He made a series of reports from Donbas as a correspondent for the Los Angeles Times. Sergei Loiko became the only foreign correspondent to visit the Donetsk airport besieged by Russian militants. At the end of October 2014, he spent four days there among the Ukrainian military and volunteers from the Right Sector, which resulted in an article with a gallery of his own photos on the front page of the Los Angeles Times.

Serhiy Loyko's report on October 29 on Echo of Moscow radio about the fighting around Donetsk airport was considered by Roskomnadzor to justify the practice of war crimes and contradict the Federal Law of July 25, 2002 № 114-FZ "On Countering Extremist Activities." The publication and the Echo of Moscow radio channel, as well as their founder, were warned about the inadmissibility of violating the legislation of the Russian Federation, and a transcript of the interview was immediately removed from the Echo of Moscow website. However, the leaders of "Echo of Moscow" said that they would seek to lift the warning in court.

Serhiy Loyko's materials, shot by him for the Los Angeles Times, received additional publicity due to the fact that his producer Victoria Butenko was nominated for an Emmy Award for a story about the Maidan.

On September 3, 2015, a presentation of Serhiy Loyko's book "Airport" took place in Kyiv. According to the author, he wrote the book about the war between Russia and Ukraine, as "it can not be called otherwise." The author said that he was obsessed with the novel during his stay with the "cyborgs" at the Donetsk airport in October 2014. "From the very beginning, I realized that this must be a novel, because in the chronicle, in the documentary evidence, it is impossible to express the full depth of the tragedy, meanness, heroism, hatred, passion inherent in this war. I could not talk about it in a cold, detached tone of a chronicler, "Loiko wrote in his blog in the publication" New Time ".

On March 15, 2018, the premiere of Sergey Loyko's television documentary four-episode series "Hybrid History" about the events of recent years in eastern Ukraine took place on the Pryamiy channel.

On April 2, 2019, on the Russian propaganda TV show "Meeting Place" (Russian: Место встречи), Sergey Loiko gave a speech in defense of Euromaidan. After the speech, Russian propagandist and host Andrei Norkin disappeared from the studio. As it became known later, the propagandist had a hypertensive crisis and was in hospital at the time of his death.

On March 11, 2022, in a video recorded during the Russian invasion of Ukraine, Loyko announced he was no longer a journalist and he had joined Ukrainian Territorial Defence Forces.

== Awards ==
In 2015, for his work in the war in Ukraine, Sergei Loiko was awarded one of the highest awards in American journalism - the Overseas Press Club Bob Considine award "for courage, authenticity, originality, depth and expressiveness of what was described." In the same year, Sergei was awarded the prestigious Los Angeles Times editorial award for "best reports of 2014".

In 2017, the book "Airport" was nominated for the National Prize of Ukraine named after Taras Shevchenko in the category of literature.
