= Airport (Loiko novel) =

2015 novel by Sergei Loiko

- Author: Sergey Loiko
- Language: Russian (also available in Ukrainian)
- Subject: War in Donbas
- Genre: Novel
- Publication date: 2015

Airport (Ukrainian: Аеропорт, romanized: Aeroport) is a novel by American war correspondent Sergey Loiko. The book is based on the heroic events of the defense of the Donetsk airport by servicemen of the Armed Forces of Ukraine and volunteers in September 2014 — February 2015. A separate chapter of the novel is devoted to the annexation of Crimea by Russia in March 2014. The slogan of the book is "The main book about the war that should not have been. And about heroes who wanted to live, but died." (Ukrainian: «Головна книга про війну, якої не мало бути. Та про героїв, які хотіли жити, але помирали»)

The book was published on September 3, 2015, by the Kyiv publishing house Bright Star Publishing in Russian. Simultaneously with the Russian original, a Ukrainian translation made by Olha Honchar also appeared. The publishers plan to translate and publish the book entirely in English and individual chapters in German.

== Background ==
The novel is conducted on behalf of a journalist-photographer, whose image resembles Sergei Loiko himself. Throughout the novel, the journalist talks about the heroic events of the defense of the Donetsk airport by servicemen of the Armed Forces of Ukraine and volunteers in September 2014 — February 2015.

== Creation of the novel ==
To convey the entire tragedy of the events of the "Russian-Ukrainian War", as the author calls it, he uses the form of artistic narration:

"Working at the Donetsk airport since October 2014 turned out to be a threshold, after which I was literally obsessed with the romance that was torn from me. I could no longer think and think about anything else. From the very beginning, I understood that it should be a novel, because in a chronicle, in a documentary evidence, it is impossible to express the full depth of tragedy, meanness, heroism, hatred, passion inherent in this war. I could not talk about it in the cold, detached tone of a chronicler." (Note: Ukrainian: «Робота в Донецькому аеропорту з жовтня 2014 року виявилася порогом, після якого я був буквально одержимий романом, що рвався з мене. Ні про що інше думати і розмірковувати я більше не міг. З самого початку я зрозумів, що це повинен бути саме роман, тому що в хроніці, в документальному свідоцтві не можна виразити всю глибину трагедії, підлості, героїзму, ненависті, пристрасті, притаманних цій війні. Я не міг розповідати про неї холодним, відстороненим тоном літописця.» — Сергій Лойко)

Starting from November 2014, according to Sergey Loiko, he mentally laid out the storylines of the future novel, pondered quotes and monologues. At the beginning of June, work on the novel went into an active stage and the first lines appeared on the computer monitor screen. In a month, the work was completed. According to the author's plan, the central image in the book was to be the image of the Donetsk airport.

"Before my eyes, one of the brightest achievements of civilization, one of the best and most modern monuments of architecture, technology and design, turned into a soot ruin, among which people continued to kill each other. Some defended their homeland, others carried out criminal orders in a war that should not have happened and for which there were no reasonable grounds, not the least significant reason." (Note: Ukrainian: «На моїх очах одне з найяскравіших досягнень цивілізації, одна з кращих і сучасних пам'яток архітектури, технології та дизайну перетворювалась на чадні руїни, серед яких люди продовжували вбивати один одного. Одні захищали свою батьківщину, інші виконували злочинні накази у війні, якої не повинно було бути і для якої не було ніяких розумних підстав, жодної щонайменше значущої причини.») — Сергій Лойко

According to the author, the war described in the book became his home. After all, in the Russian-Ukrainian war, peoples close to Serhiy Loiko are fighting and dying on different sides: Ukrainians and Russians.

== Publication of the book in Ukraine ==
=== Book-trailer ===
Immediately after the release of the book in Ukraine in early September 2015, a Ukrainian book trailer for the book appeared, which used a fragment of the Ukrainian folk song "Oh, someone's horse is standing" performed by the band "Okean Elzy".

=== Presentation of the book in Ukraine ===
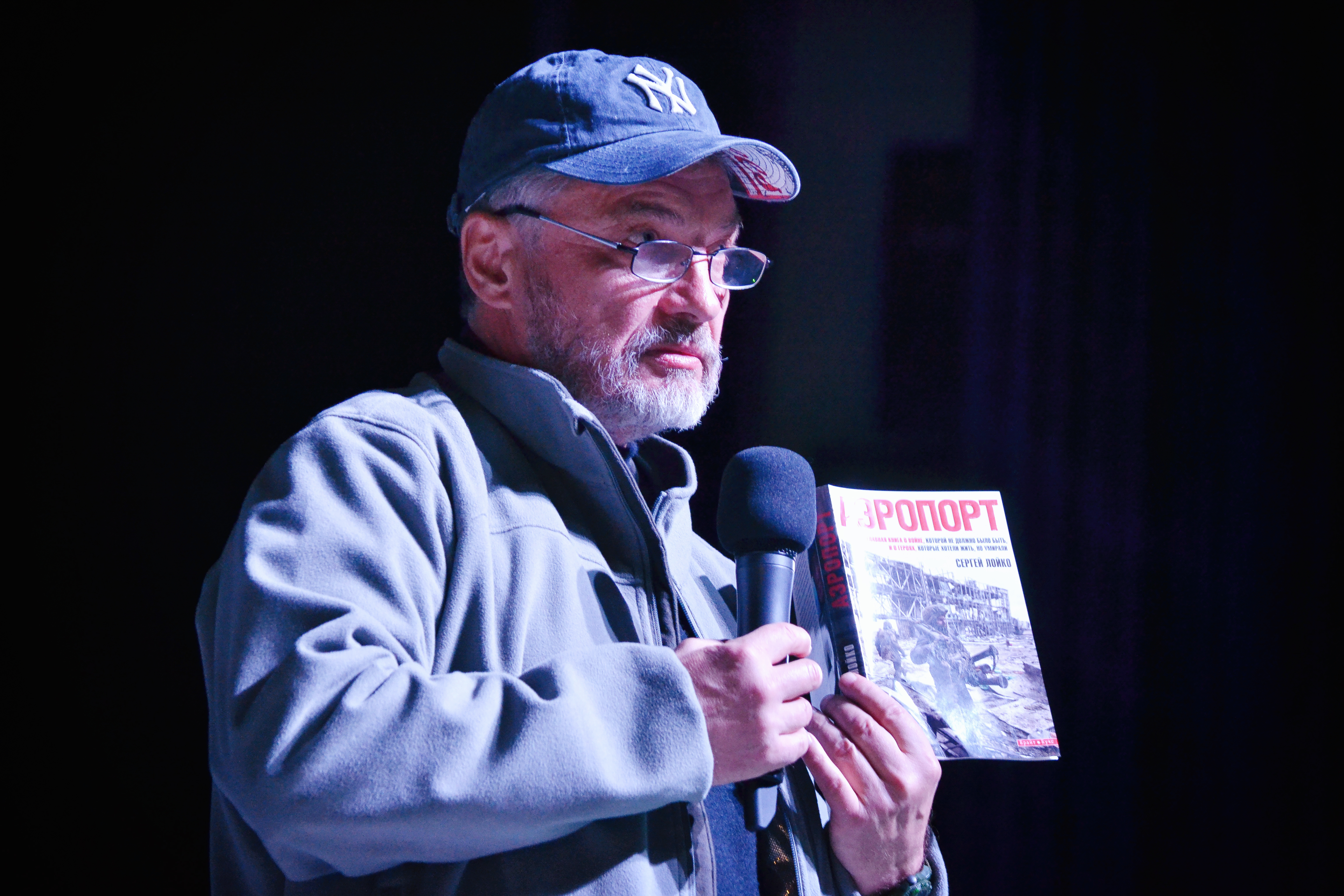
Sergey Loiko at the presentation of the book in Mykolaiv

On September 3, in Kyiv, in the Ukrainian House, the book was presented to readers in a crowded hall. Sergey Loiko read out a fragment from the novel, after which the "cyborgs" — military personnel-defenders of the Donetsk airport, who served as prototypes of the characters of the book, appeared on the stage. Among the visitors of the presentation was the wife of the President of Ukraine Petro Poroshenko, Maryna Poroshenko. At the end of the presentation, everyone was able to get autographs from the author and the "cyborgs".

Presentations of the book took place in major Ukrainian cities: Kharkiv (October 3, 2015), Dnipropetrovsk (October 5, 2015), Mykolaiv (October 9, 2015) and others.

== Translations into Ukrainian ==
Printed edition

- Serhiy Loiko. Airport. Translated from Russian: Olga Gonchar. Kyiv: Bright Books. 2015. 344 p. ISBN 978-966-2665-68-0 (1st edition)
  - (reprint) Serhiy Loiko. Airport. Translated from Russian: Olga Gonchar. Kyiv: Bright Books. 2016. 344 p. ISBN 978-966-2665-93-2 (2nd edition)

Audiobook

In January 2016, a CD audiobook of Ukrainian translation with excerpts from the novel also appeared. Excerpts of the novel were read by Ukrainian actor Oleksiy Gorbunov, and the author of the novel, Sergey Loiko, voiced a chapter about the mother of a Moscow soldier - an occupier who comes to the place of his death in Ukraine. The audiobook also uses musical works "Warriors of Light" by BRUTTO, "Earth" by Riffmaster and Sashko Polozhynskyi, "Oh Whose Horse Stands" performed by Okean Elzy, "I Don't Want to Be a Hero of Ukraine" by Tartak and "Smell of War" by TiK.

- (excerpts of the novel)
  - Sergey Loiko. Airport. Translated from Russian: Olga Gonchar. Kyiv: Bright Books. 2016. Duration: 11 hours 30 minutes 51 seconds; format: MP3
