= Reggio di Calabria Aeroporto railway station =

Train station in Italy

Reggio di Calabria Aeroporto

General information
- Location: Reggio Calabria, Province of Reggio Calabria, Calabria; Italy
- Coordinates: 38°04′02″N 15°39′06″E
- Owner: Rete Ferroviaria Italiana
- Operator: Trenitalia
- Line: Jonica railway

History
- Opened: 21 February 2013; 13 years ago
Location
- Location within Italy

Reggio di Calabria Aeroporto is a railway station in Reggio Calabria serving Reggio Calabria Airport, Italy. The station is located on the Jonica railway . The train services are operated by Trenitalia.

The station lies 1 km from the airport; there is a free shuttle bus service between the two.

== Train services ==
The station is served by the following service(s):

- Regional services (Treno regionale) Cantanzaro Lido - Roccella Jonica - Melito di Porto Salvo - Reggio Calabria
- Metropolitan services (Treno regionale) Rosarno - Villa San Giovanni - Reggio Calabria - Melito di Porto Salvo
