= Udarnik, Voronezh Oblast =

Udarnik Ударник
- Selo
- Location within Voronezh Oblast Location within Russia
- Coordinates: 50°55′N 40°43′E
- Country: Russia
- Region: Voronezh Oblast
- District: Buturlinovsky District
- Time zone: UTC+3:00

Udarnik (Russian: Ударник) is a rural locality (a selo) in Chulokskoye Rural Settlement, Buturlinovsky District, Voronezh Oblast, Russia. The population was 490 as of 2010. There are 10 streets.

== Geography ==
Udarnik is located 19 km northeast of Buturlinovka (the district's administrative centre) by road. Chulok is the nearest rural locality.
