= São Joaquim, São Tomé and Príncipe =

São Joaquim
- Settlement
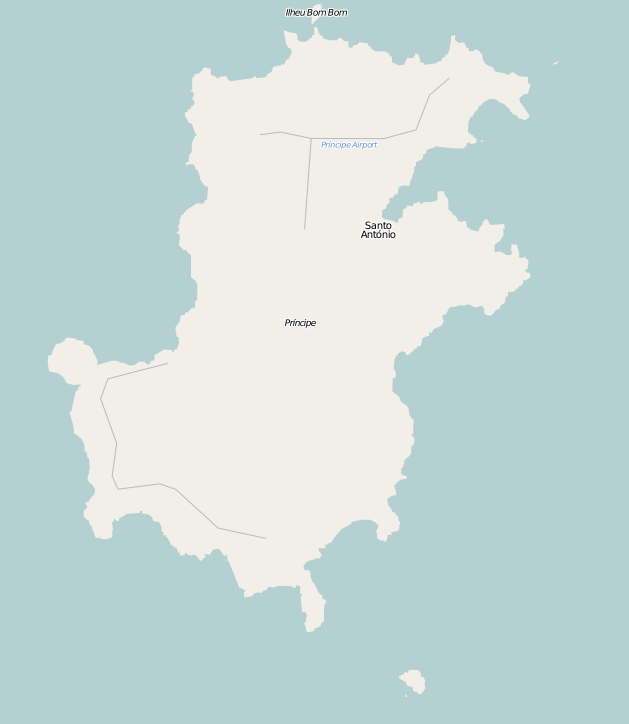
- Location on Príncipe Island
- Coordinates: 1.6207°N 7.377°E
- Country: São Tomé and Príncipe
- Autonomous Region: Príncipe

Population (2012)
  - Total: 93
- Time zone: UTC+1 (WAT)

São Joaquim is a village in the western part of Príncipe Island in São Tomé and Príncipe. Its population is 93 (2012 census). São Joaquim is located 5 km southwest of the island capital of Santo António.

== Population history ==
Historical population
Year	Pop.	±%
2001	110	—
2008	125	+13.6%
2012	93	−25.6%
