= Aéroport =

- Quartier
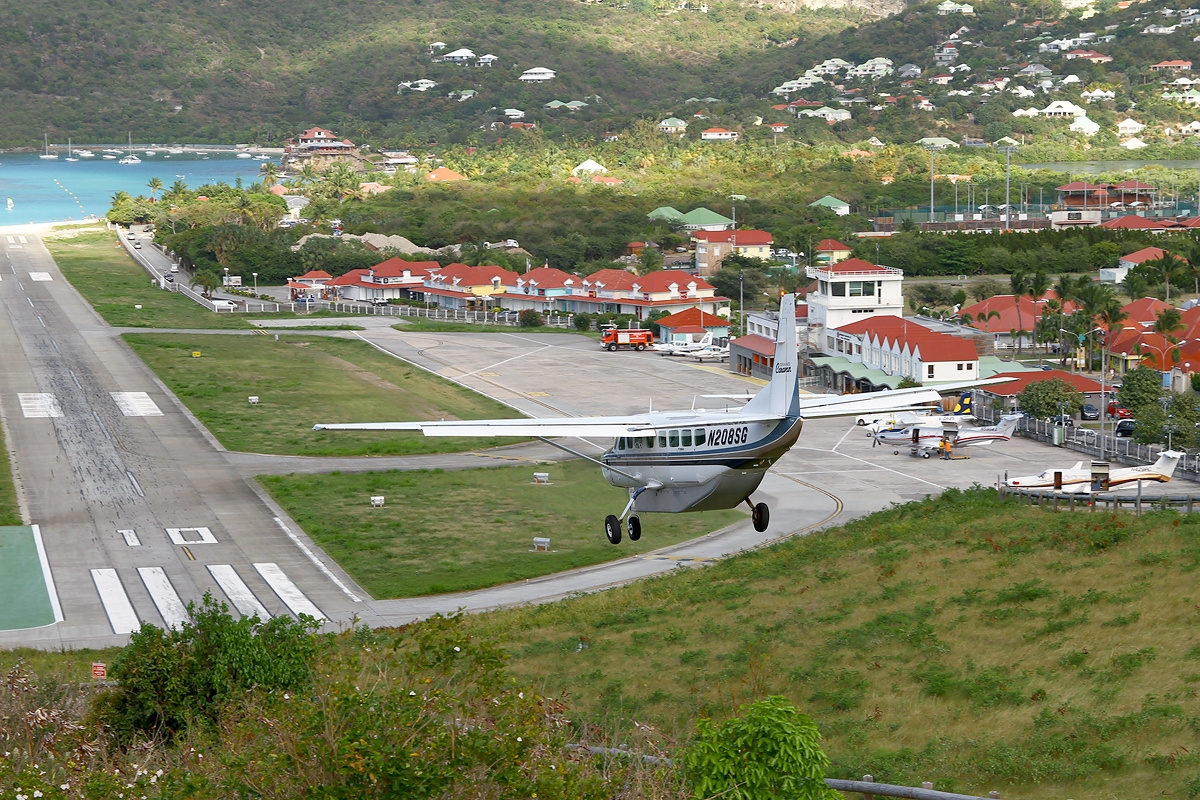

- The quartier of Aéroport marked 15.
- Coordinates: 17°54′12″N 62°50′35″W
- Country: France
- Overseas collectivity: Saint Barthélemy

Aéroport (French pronunciation: [aeʁɔpɔʁ]) is the place of Gustaf III Airport, in quartier Saint-Jean of Saint Barthélemy in the Caribbean. It is located in the northern part of the island. As the name suggests, it contains the airport runway.
