= Tyoply Klyuch, Republic of Bashkortostan =

Tyoply Klyuch Тёплый Ключ
- Village
- Location within Bashkortostan Location within Russia
- Coordinates: 55°19′N 58°41′E
- Country: Russia
- Region: Bashkortostan
- District: Kiginsky District
- Time zone: UTC+5:00

Tyoply Klyuch (Russian: Тёплый Ключ) is a rural locality (a village) in Verkhnekiginsky Selsoviet, Kiginsky District, Bashkortostan, Russia. The population was 71 as of 2010. There is 1 street.

== Geography ==
Tyoply Klyuch is located 12 km southeast of Verkhniye Kigi (the district's administrative centre) by road. Tuguzly is the nearest rural locality.
