= Portinho, São Tomé and Príncipe =

Portinho
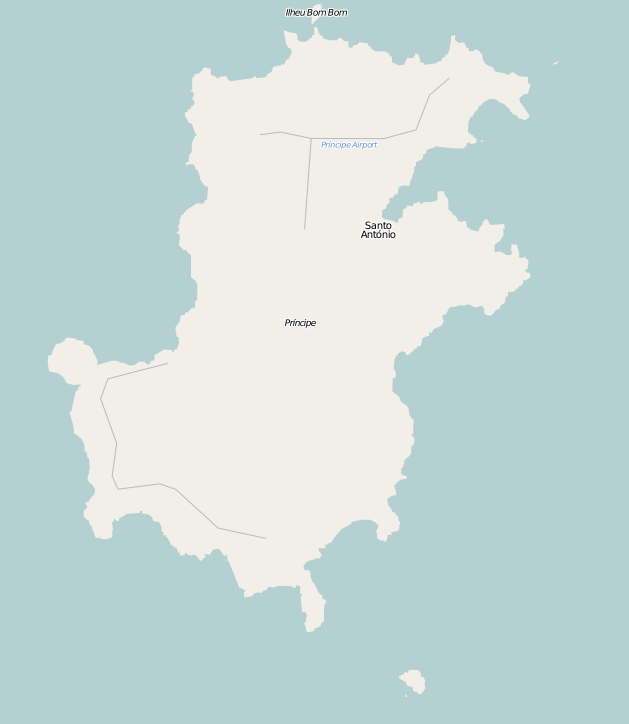
- Location on São Tomé Island
- Coordinates: 1°38′N 7°26′E
- Country: São Tomé and Príncipe
- Autonomous Region: Príncipe

Population (2012)
  - Total: 3
- Time zone: UTC+1 (WAT)

Portinho is a village on Príncipe Island in the nation of São Tomé and Príncipe located 2 km east of the island capital Santo António. Its population is 3 (2012 census).
