= Aeroporto, Príncipe =

Aeroporto
- Settlement
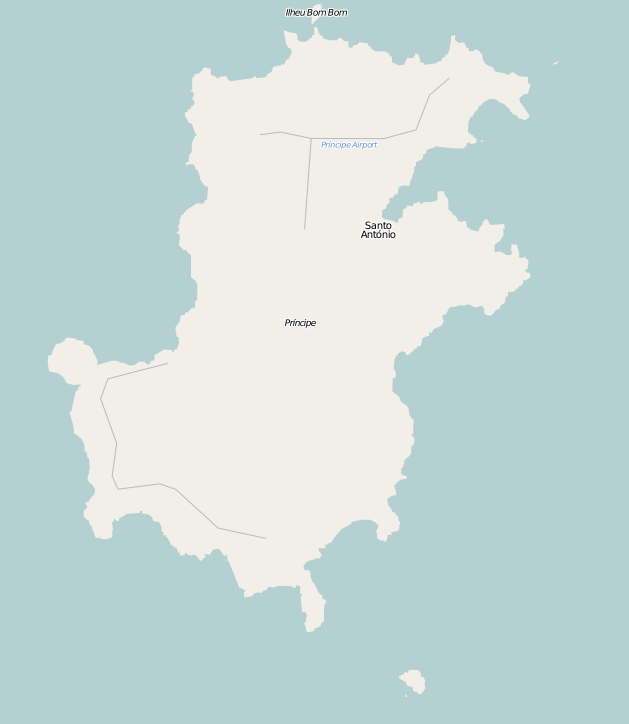
- Location on Príncipe Island
- Coordinates: 1.6652°N 7.4132°E
- Country: São Tomé and Príncipe
- Autonomous Region: Príncipe

Population (2012)
  - Total: 243
- Time zone: UTC+1 (WAT)

Aeroporto is a settlement in the northern part of Príncipe Island in São Tomé and Príncipe. Its population is 243 (2012 census). Aeroporto settlement lies directly east of the Príncipe Airport (hence the name) and north of the island capital Santo António.

== Population history ==
Historical population
Year	Pop.	±%
2001	304	—
2008	347	+14.1%
2012	243	−30.0%
