= Tomponsky District =

Tomponsky District Томпонский улус (Russian)
- District

Other transcription(s)
  - Sakha: Томпо улууhа
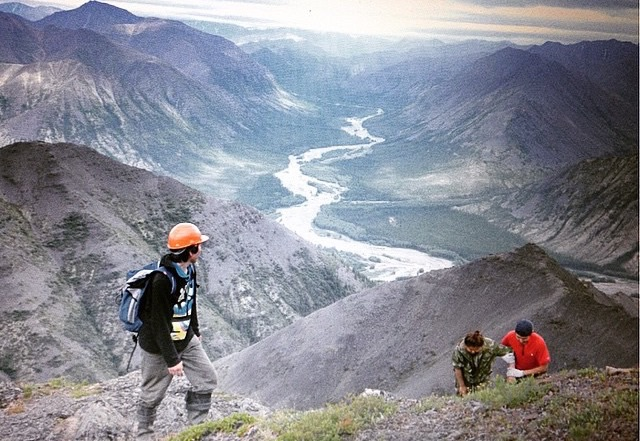
- Suntar-Khayata Zakaznik (nature park), Tomponsky District

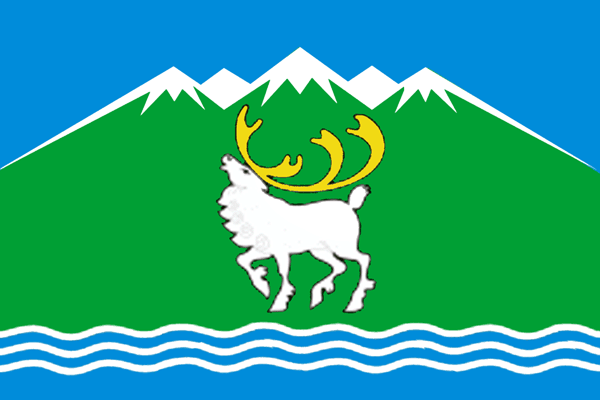
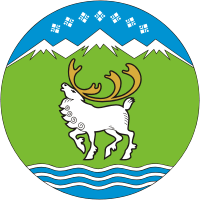
- Flag Coat of arms
- Location of Tomponsky District in the Sakha Republic
- Coordinates: 62°39′12″N 135°33′33″E
- Country: Russia
- Federal subject: Sakha Republic
- Established: May 20, 1931
- Administrative center: Khandyga

Area
  - Total: 135,800 km^{2} (52,400 sq mi)

Population (2010 Census)
  - Total: 14,099
  - Density: 0.1038/km^{2} (0.2689/sq mi)
  - Urban: 59.1%
  - Rural: 40.9%

Administrative structure
  - Administrative divisions: 2 Settlements, 7 Rural okrugs
  - Inhabited localities: 2 urban-type settlements, 12 rural localities

Municipal structure
  - Municipally incorporated as: Tomponsky Municipal District
  - Municipal divisions: 2 urban settlements, 7 rural settlements
- Time zone: UTC+
- OKTMO ID: 98650000
- Website: https://mr-tomponskij.sakha.gov.ru/

Tomponsky District (Russian: Томпонский улу́с; Yakut: Томпо улууһа, Tompo uluuha) is an administrative and municipal district (raion, or ulus), one of the thirty-four in the Sakha Republic, Russia. It is located in the east of the republic and borders with Momsky District in the northeast, Oymyakonsky District in the east, Ust-Maysky District in the southeast, Tattinsky District in the southwest, Ust-Aldansky and Kobyaysky Districts in the west, and with Verkhoyansky District in the north and northwest. The area of the district is 135,800 square kilometers (52,400 sq mi). Its administrative center is the urban locality (a settlement) of Khandyga. Population: 14,099 (2010 census); 15,275 (2002 Census); 22,844 (1989 Soviet census). The population of Khandyga accounts for 47.1% of the district's total population.

Historical population
Year	Pop.	±%
1970	13,205	—
1979	18,004	+36.3%
1989	22,844	+26.9%
2002	15,275	−33.1%
2010	14,099	−7.7%
2021	11,241	−20.3%
Source: Census data

== Geography ==
The landscape of the district is mostly mountainous. Its main rivers include the Aldan, the Tompo, Adycha, Nelgese, Derbeke and the Khandyga. Emanda is a lake located on the Yana Plateau, in the northern part of the district.

=== Climate ===
Average January temperature ranges from −38 to −42 °C (−36 to −44 °F) and average July temperature ranges from +10 to +17 °C (50 to 63 °F). Annual precipitation is 250–300 millimeters (9.8–11.8 in).

== History ==
The district was established on May 20, 1931.

== Demographics ==
As of the 2021 Census, the ethnic composition was as follows:

- Yakuts: 44.3%
- Russians: 38.2%
- Evens: 10.3%
- Ukrainians: 1.4%
- other ethnicities: 5.8%

== Economy ==
The economy of the district is based on mining, production of construction materials, and agriculture. There are deposits of tin, tungsten, copper, lead, zinc, antimony, molybdenum, gold, silver, coal, gypsum, marble, and other minerals.

== Inhabited localities ==
Municipal composition
Urban settlements	Population	Male	Female	Inhabited localities in jurisdiction
Dzhebariki-Khaya (Джебарики-Хая)	1694	844 (49.8%)	850 (50.2%)	**Urban-type settlement of Dzhebariki-Khaya**
Khandyga (Хандыга)	6638	3326 (49.8%)	3312 (50.2%)	Urban-type settlement of Khandyga (administrative centre of the district)
Rural settlements	Population	Male	Female	Rural localities in jurisdiction*
Bayagantaysky Nasleg (Баягантайский наслег)	1823	884 (48.5%)	939 (51.5%)	**selo of Krest-Khaldzhan**; selo of Ary-Tolon; selo of Udarnik
Megino-Aldansky Nasleg (Мегино-Алданский наслег)	1020	490 (48.0%)	530 (52.0%)	**selo of Megino-Aldan**
Okhot-Perevozovsky Nasleg (Охот-Перевозовский наслег)	142	70 (49.3%)	72 (50.7%)	**selo of Okhotsky-Perevoz**
Sasylsky Nasleg (Сасыльский наслег)	555	275 (49.5%)	280 (50.5%)	**selo of Keskil**
Teploklyuchevsky Nasleg (Теплоключевский наслег)	887	447 (50.4%)	440 (49.6%)	**selo of Teply Klyuch**; selo of Aeroport; selo of Razvilka
Tomponsky National Nasleg (Томпонский национальный наслег)	915	458 (50.1%)	457 (49.9%)	**selo of Topolinoye**
Ynginsky Nasleg (Ынгинский наслег)	425	217 (51.1%)	208 (48.9%)	**selo of Novy**; selo of Saydy

Divisional source:
Population source:
*Administrative centers are shown in bold
