= Khandyga =

Khandyga Хандыга
- Urban-type settlement

Other transcription(s)
  - Yakut: Хаандыга
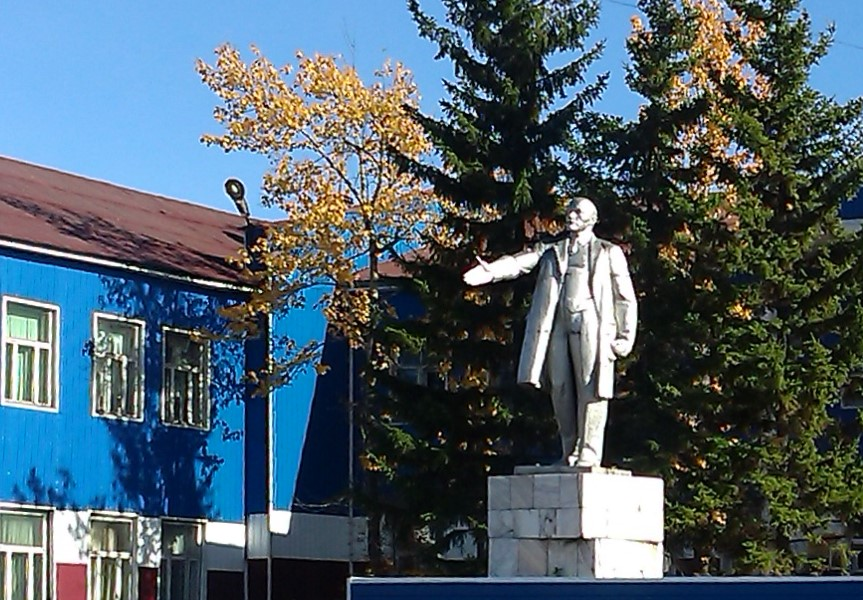

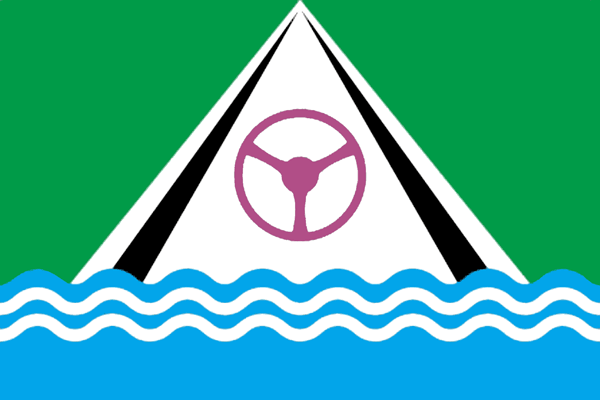
- Flag
- Interactive map of Khandyga
- Location of Khandyga Khandyga (Sakha Republic)
- Coordinates: 62°39′09″N 135°34′03″E
- Country: Russia
- Federal subject: Sakha Republic
- Administrative district: Tomponsky District
- SettlementSelsoviet: Khandyga
- Founded: 1938
- Urban-type settlement status since: 1957

Population (2010 Census)
  - Total: 6,638
  - Estimate (2023): 5,179 (−22%)

Administrative status
  - Capital of: Tomponsky District, Settlement of Khandyga

Municipal status
  - Municipal district: Tomponsky Municipal District
  - Urban settlement: Khandyga Urban Settlement
  - Capital of: Tomponsky Municipal District, Khandyga Urban Settlement
- Time zone: UTC+
- Postal codes: 678719, 678720
- OKTMO ID: 98650151051
- Website: www.sakha.gov.ru/section/88/settlement/2719

Khandyga population
- 2010 Census: 6,638
- 2002 Census: 7,025
- 1989 Census: 9,536
- 1979 Census: 7,176

Khandyga (Russian: Хандыга; Yakut: Хаандыга, Xaandıga) is an urban locality (an urban-type settlement) and the administrative center of Tomponsky District in the Sakha Republic, Russia, 380 kilometers (240 mi) northeast of Yakutsk, the capital of the republic. As of the 2010 Census, its population was 6,638.

== Geography ==
Khandyga is located on the northeast corner of the Aldan River, by a bend where the river turns from north to west. The R504 Kolyma Highway passes through the town and the Ulakhan-Bom and Sette-Daban mountain ranges rise to the east.

== History ==
It was founded in 1938 as a base for the construction of the Kolyma Highway towards Magadan. During World War II, an airfield was built here for the Alaska-Siberian air route used to ferry American Lend-Lease aircraft to the Eastern Front. From 1951 until 1954, it served as a base for Yanstroy forced-labor camp of the gulag network.

In 1954, Khandyga became the administrative center of Tomponsky District. It was granted urban-type settlement status in 1957.

== Administrative and municipal status ==
Within the framework of administrative divisions, the urban-type settlement of Khandyga serves as the administrative center of Tomponsky District. As an administrative division, it is incorporated within Tomponsky District as the Settlement of Khandyga. As a municipal division, the Settlement of Khandyga is incorporated within Tomponsky Municipal District as Khandyga Urban Settlement.

== Transportation ==
There was a summer hydrofoil service to Yakutsk. (The hydrofoil service was cancelled in 1998.) Khandyga is also served by the Teply Klyuch Airport (IATA: KDY).
