= List of islands of São Tomé and Príncipe =

São Tomé and Príncipe is an island country off the coast of West Africa, located in the Gulf of Guinea. The two main islands are São Tomé Island and Príncipe, which are part of the Cameroon Line of volcanic islands. An incomplete list of the other, smaller islands in the country:

- Ilhéu Bom Bom
- Ilhéu das Cabras
- Ilhéu Caroço
- Ilhéu Gabado
- Ilhéu dos Mosteiros
- Pedra da Galé
- Ilhéu Quixibá
- Ilhéu das Rolas
- Ilhéu de Santana
- Ilhéu de São Miguel
- Sete Pedras
- Tinhosa Grande
- Tinhosa Pequena
