= Geography of São Tomé and Príncipe =

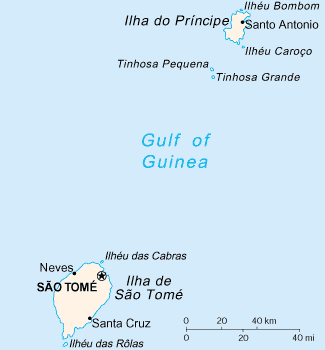
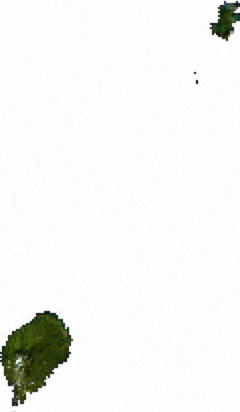
Map of São Tomé and Príncipe

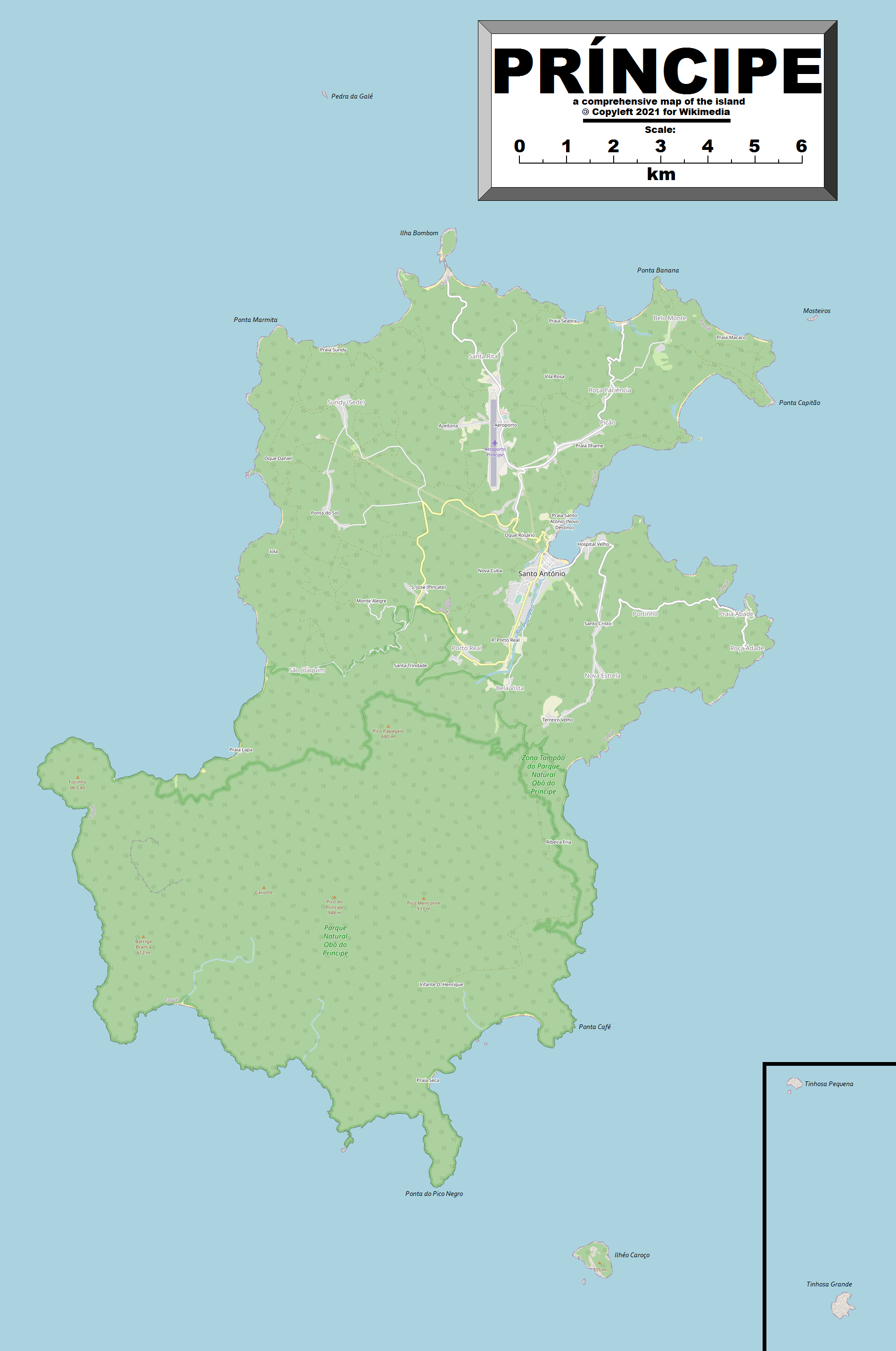
Enlargeable, detailed map of Príncipe

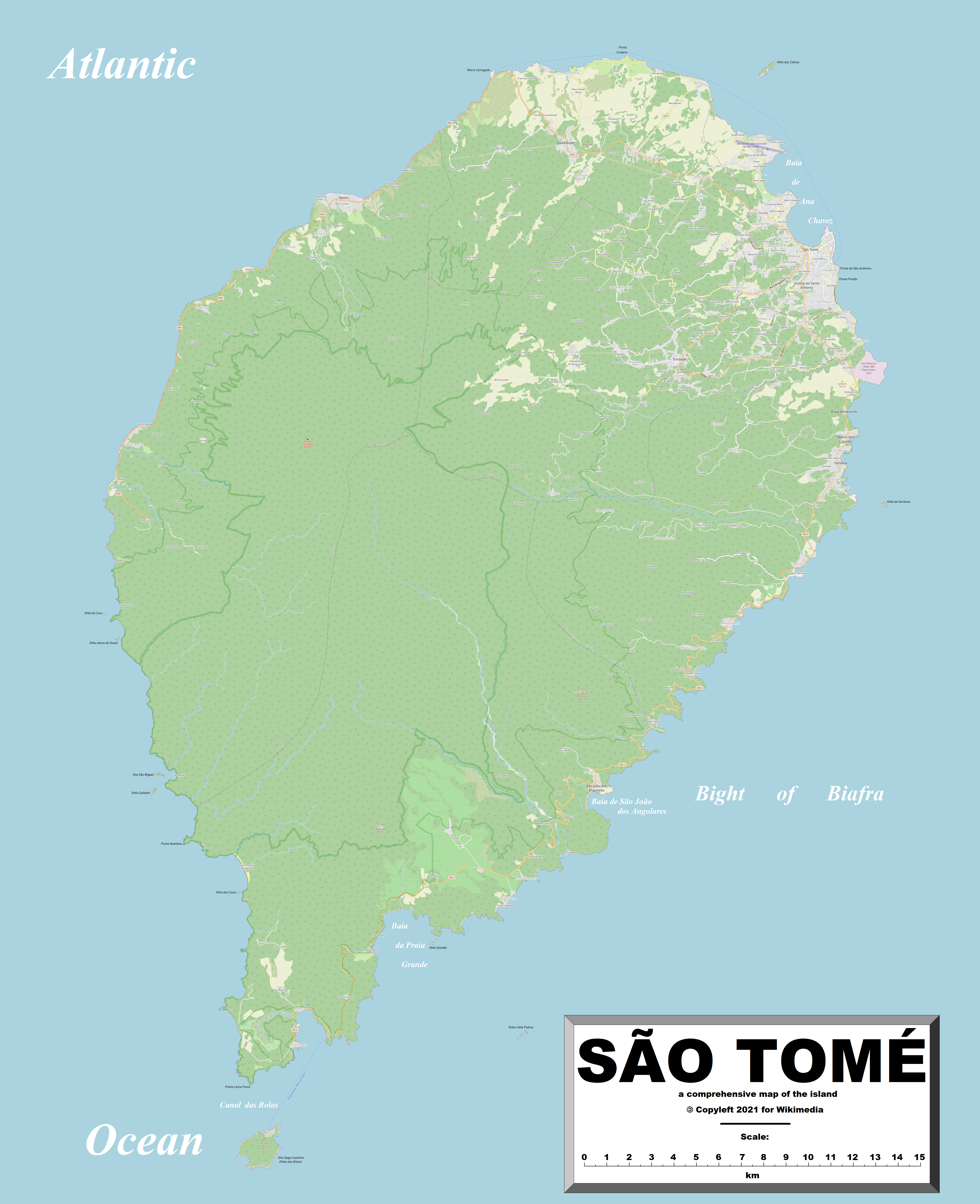
Enlargeable, detailed map of Sao Tome

São Tomé and Príncipe is a small island country composed of an archipelago located in the Gulf of Guinea of the equatorial Atlantic Ocean. The nation's main islands are São Tomé and Príncipe, for which the country is named. These are located about 300 and 250 kilometres (190 and 160 mi), respectively, off the northwest coast of Gabon in Central Africa.

São Tomé and Príncipe constitute one of Africa's smallest countries, with 209 km (130 mi) of coastline. Both are part of an extinct volcanic mountain range called the Cameroon line, which also includes the island of Bioko in Equatorial Guinea to the northeast and Mount Cameroon on the mainland coast further northeast. São Tomé is 50 km (30 mi) long and 30 km (20 mi) wide and the more mountainous of the two islands. Its peaks reach 2,024 m (6,640 ft) - Pico de São Tomé. Principe is about 30 km (19 mi) long and 6 km (4 mi) wide, making it the smaller of the two. Its peaks reach 948 m (3,110 ft) - Pico de Príncipe. This makes the total land area of the country 1,001 km^{2} (386 sq mi), about five times the size of Washington, D.C. Both islands are crossed by swift streams radiating down the mountains through lush forest and cropland to the sea. Both islands at a distance of 150 km^{2} (60 sq mi). The equator lies immediately south of São Tomé Island, passing through an islet Ilhéu das Rolas.

The Pico Cão Grande (Great Dog Peak) is a landmark volcanic plug peak, located at 0°7′0″N 6°34′00″E in southern São Tomé. It rises dramatically over 300 m (1,000 ft) above the surrounding terrain and the summit is 663 m (2,175 ft) above sea level.

== Climate ==
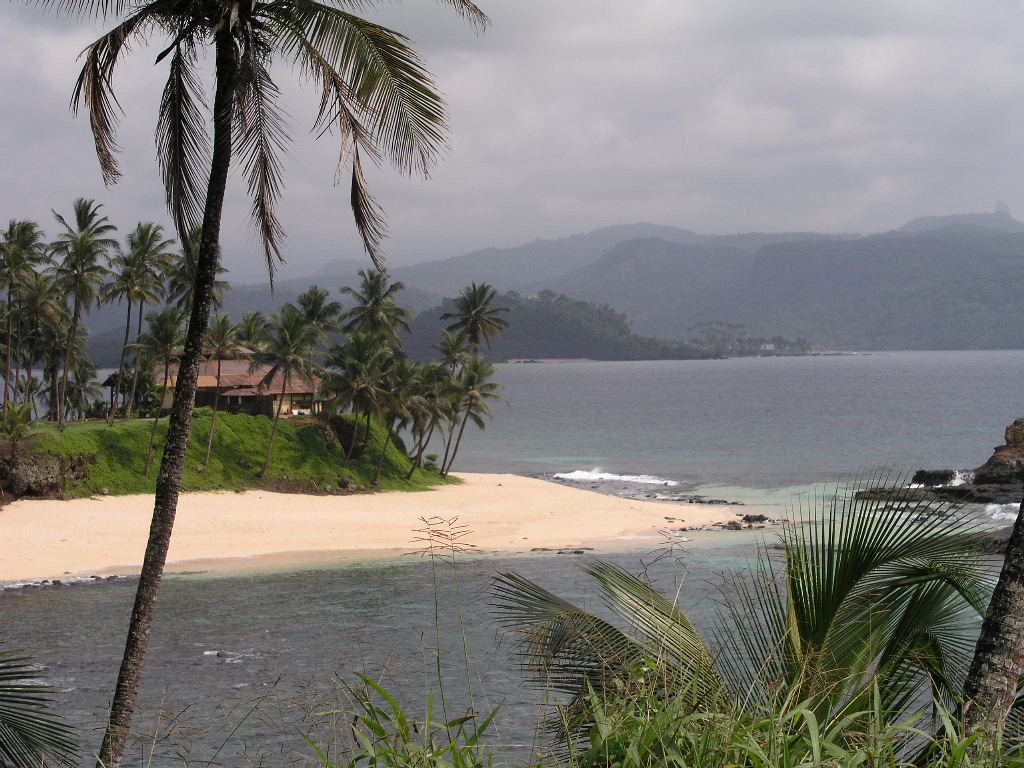
Beach scenery on São Tomé.

At sea level, the climate is tropical—hot and humid with average yearly temperatures of about 27 °C (80.6 °F) and little daily variation. At the interior's higher altitudes, the average yearly temperature is 20 °C (68 °F), and nights are generally cool. Annual rainfall varies from 5,000 mm (196.9 in) on the southwestern slopes to 1,000 mm (39.4 in) in the northern lowlands. The rainy season runs from October to May.

Climate data for São Tomé (São Tomé International Airport)
Month	Jan	Feb	Mar	Apr	May	Jun	Jul	Aug	Sep	Oct	Nov	Dec	Year
Record high °C (°F)	32.0 (89.6)	33.6 (92.5)	33.5 (92.3)	33.4 (92.1)	33.9 (93.0)	31.0 (87.8)	30.7 (87.3)	31.0 (87.8)	31.7 (89.1)	31.5 (88.7)	31.6 (88.9)	32.0 (89.6)	33.9 (93.0)
Mean daily maximum °C (°F)	29.4 (84.9)	29.9 (85.8)	30.2 (86.4)	30.1 (86.2)	29.3 (84.7)	28.0 (82.4)	27.3 (81.1)	27.7 (81.9)	28.6 (83.5)	28.7 (83.7)	29.0 (84.2)	29.1 (84.4)	28.9 (84.0)
Daily mean °C (°F)	25.9 (78.6)	26.2 (79.2)	26.4 (79.5)	26.4 (79.5)	26.0 (78.8)	24.7 (76.5)	23.8 (74.8)	24.1 (75.4)	25.0 (77.0)	25.2 (77.4)	25.5 (77.9)	25.6 (78.1)	25.4 (77.7)
Mean daily minimum °C (°F)	22.4 (72.3)	22.5 (72.5)	22.6 (72.7)	22.6 (72.7)	22.6 (72.7)	21.4 (70.5)	20.4 (68.7)	20.5 (68.9)	21.3 (70.3)	21.8 (71.2)	22.0 (71.6)	22.1 (71.8)	21.8 (71.2)
Record low °C (°F)	19.1 (66.4)	19.6 (67.3)	19.2 (66.6)	19.4 (66.9)	18.5 (65.3)	14.0 (57.2)	14.0 (57.2)	13.4 (56.1)	16.0 (60.8)	18.3 (64.9)	18.8 (65.8)	19.6 (67.3)	13.4 (56.1)
Average rainfall mm (inches)	81 (3.2)	84 (3.3)	131 (5.2)	122 (4.8)	113 (4.4)	19 (0.7)	0 (0)	1 (0.0)	17 (0.7)	110 (4.3)	99 (3.9)	108 (4.3)	885 (34.8)
Average rainy days (≥ 0.1 mm)	8	8	12	11	10	3	2	3	6	12	11	8	94
Average relative humidity (%)	85	84	83	83	84	79	77	78	79	82	85	85	82
Mean monthly sunshine hours	142.6	135.6	139.5	126.0	145.7	165.0	161.2	148.8	120.0	114.7	135.0	142.6	1,676.7
Mean daily sunshine hours	4.6	4.8	4.5	4.2	4.7	5.5	5.2	4.8	4.0	3.7	4.5	4.6	4.6
Source: Deutscher Wetterdienst

Climate data for Santo Antonio
Month	Jan	Feb	Mar	Apr	May	Jun	Jul	Aug	Sep	Oct	Nov	Dec	Year
Mean daily maximum °C (°F)	29.0 (84.2)	29.6 (85.3)	29.6 (85.3)	29.4 (84.9)	28.8 (83.8)	27.6 (81.7)	26.8 (80.2)	27.1 (80.8)	27.4 (81.3)	27.5 (81.5)	28.2 (82.8)	28.6 (83.5)	28.3 (82.9)
Daily mean °C (°F)	25.5 (77.9)	24.8 (76.6)	25.8 (78.4)	25.8 (78.4)	25.4 (77.7)	24.2 (75.6)	23.5 (74.3)	23.8 (74.8)	24.3 (75.7)	24.4 (75.9)	24.8 (76.6)	25.2 (77.4)	24.8 (76.6)
Mean daily minimum °C (°F)	22.0 (71.6)	20.0 (68.0)	22.0 (71.6)	22.1 (71.8)	21.9 (71.4)	20.7 (69.3)	20.2 (68.4)	20.4 (68.7)	21.2 (70.2)	21.4 (70.5)	21.4 (70.5)	21.8 (71.2)	21.2 (70.2)
Average rainfall mm (inches)	113 (4.4)	105 (4.1)	186 (7.3)	233 (9.2)	229 (9.0)	89 (3.5)	21 (0.8)	36 (1.4)	146 (5.7)	398 (15.7)	174 (6.9)	142 (5.6)	1,872 (73.6)
Average rainy days (≥ 0.1 mm)	14	11	16	18	18	7	14	12	21	25	18	14	188
Average relative humidity (%)	88	86	86	87	88	83	83	83	86	89	88	87	86
Source: Deutscher Wetterdienst

=== Climate change ===
Between 1950 and 2010, São Tomé and Príncipe experienced an increase of 1.5 °C in average annual temperature due to climate change. The country is considered highly vulnerable to its impacts. Climate change is projected to lead to an increased number of warm days and nights, hotter temperatures and increased precipitation. Sea level rise and saltwater intrusion will be major issues for the islands and climate change will have major impacts on agriculture in the country. The government began developing a National Adaptation Plan in 2022 to implement climate adaptation efforts, with support from the United Nations Environment Programme.

== Wildlife ==
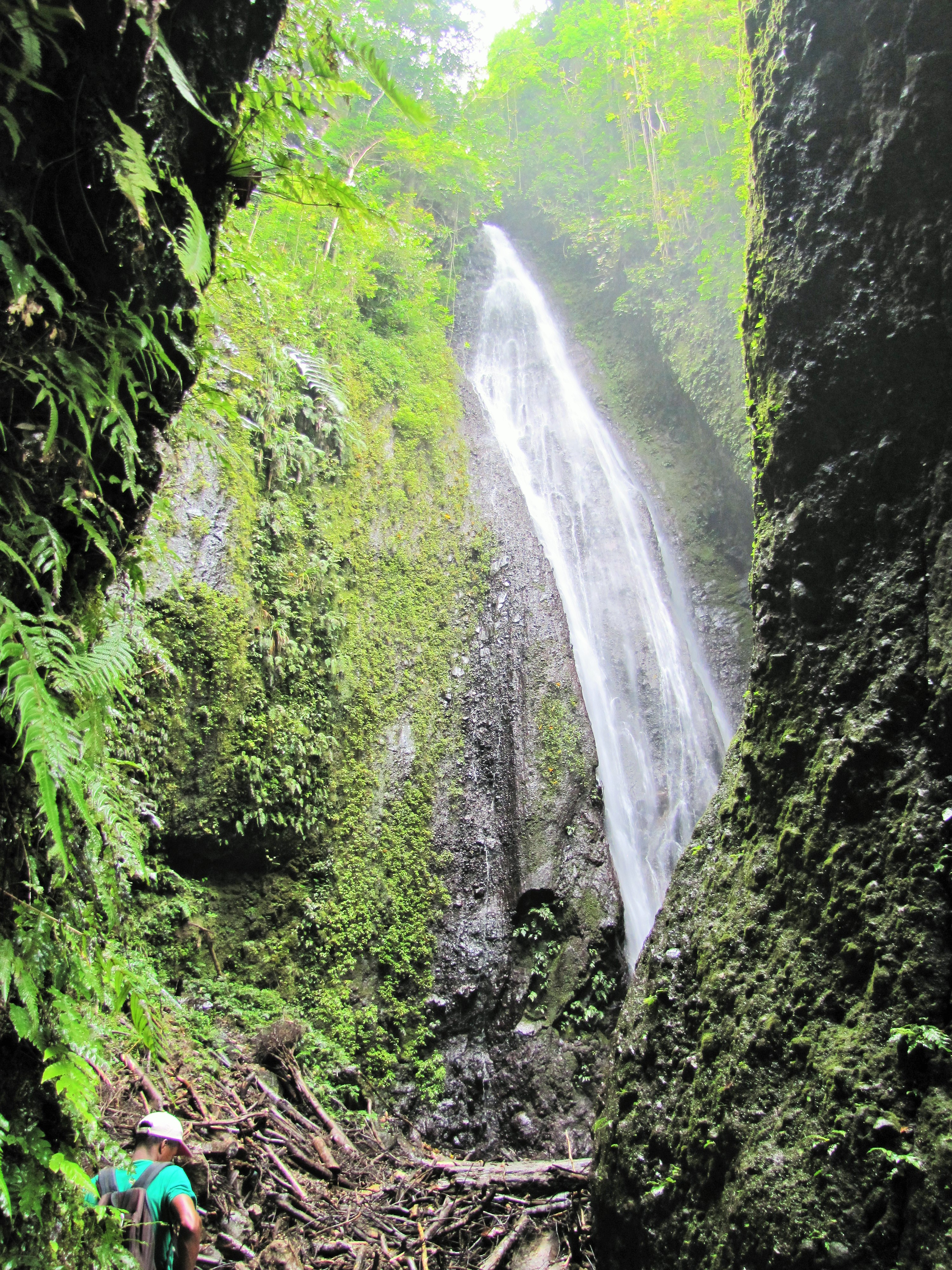
Waterfalls near Ponta Figo, São Tomé and Príncipe

The two islands are oceanic islands which have always been separate from mainland Central Africa and so there is a relatively low diversity of species, restricted to those that have managed to cross the sea to the islands. However the level of endemism is high with many species occurring nowhere else in the world.

== Statistics ==
Maritime claims:

- Measured from claimed archipelagic baselines
- Exclusive economic zone: 200 nmi (370.4 km; 230.2 mi)
- Territorial sea: 12 nmi (22.2 km; 13.8 mi)
Climate
Tropical; hot, humid; one rainy season (October to May)
Terrain
Volcanic, mountainous
Elevation extremes
- Lowest point: Atlantic Ocean 0 m (0 ft)
Natural resources
Fish, hydropower:
Environment—current issues
Deforestation; soil erosion and exhaustion
Environment—international agreements
- Party to: Biodiversity, Climate Change, Desertification, Environmental Modification, Law of the Sea, Ship Pollution
- Signed, but not ratified: None of the selected agreements

== Extreme points ==
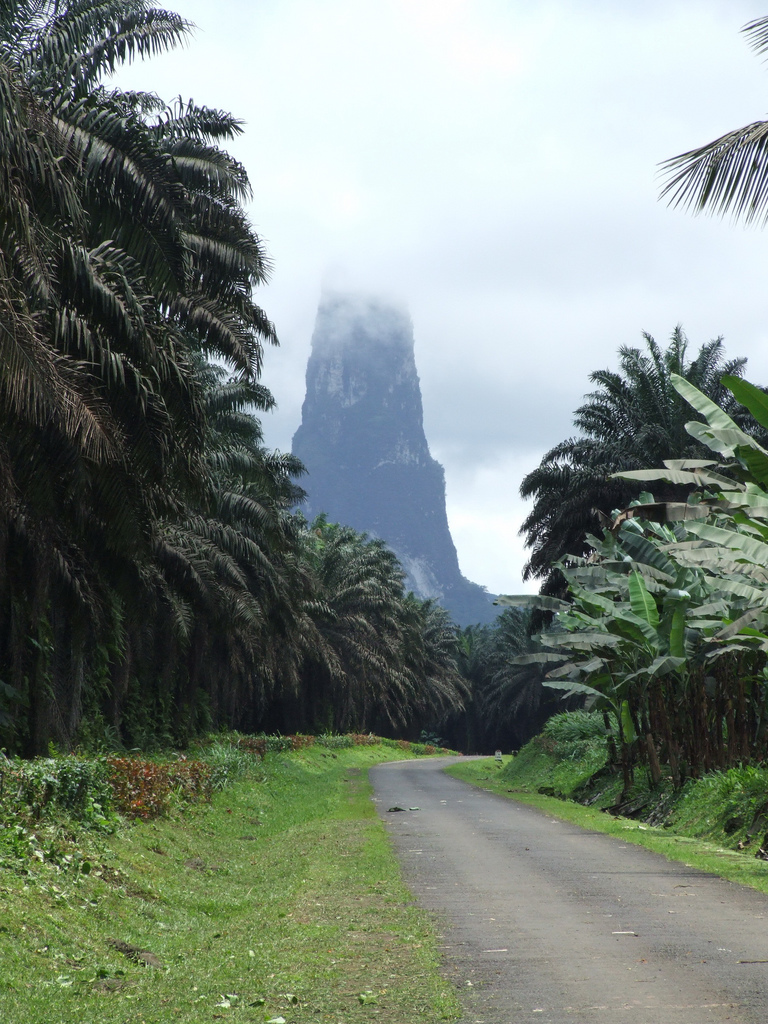
Pico Cão Grande.

This is a list of the extreme points of São Tomé and Príncipe, the points that are farther north, south, east or west than any other location.

- Northernmost point - unnamed headland on Ilhéu Bom Bom
- Easternmost point - Ponta Capitão, Príncipe
- Southernmost point - unnamed headland on Ilhéu das Rolas
- Westernmost point - Ponta Azeitona

== See also ==
- São Tomé and Príncipe
