= Caué District =

District of São Tomé and Príncipe

Caué
- District
- Location within São Tomé and Príncipe
- Coordinates: 0°5′N 6°35′E
- Country: São Tomé and Príncipe
- Island: São Tomé
- Seat: São João dos Angolares

Area
  - Total: 267 km^{2} (103 sq mi)

Population (2012)
  - Total: 6,031
  - Density: 22.6/km^{2} (58.5/sq mi)
- Time zone: UTC+0 (UTC)

Caué is a district of São Tomé and Príncipe, on São Tomé Island. Covering 267 km^{2} (103 sq mi), it is the largest of the nation's seven districts in terms of area. In population it is the smallest, with 6,031 residents (2012). The district seat is São João dos Angolares. It is divided into the two statistical subdistricts São João dos Angolares and Malanza.

== Geography ==
The district includes the small islet of Rolas where the equator passes right though the islet's only settlement. Other islets of the district include Ilhéu Quixibá and Sete Pedras. Much of the district lies within Parque Natural Obô de São Tomé. The most notable natural landmark is the volcanic vent Pico Cão Grande.

== Population ==
Population of Caué District (1940—2012)
| Year | Population |
|---|---|
| 1940 | 6,653 |
| 1950 | 6,917 |
| 1960 | 5,848 |
| 1970 | 3,837 |
| 1981 | 4,607 |
| 1991 | 5,322 |
| 2001 | 5,501 |
| 2012 | 6,031 |

== Settlements ==
The main settlement is the town of São João dos Angolares. Other settlements are:

- Angra Toldo
- Dona Augusta
- Ilhéu das Rolas
- Monte Mário
- Ponta Baleia
- Porto Alegre
- Praia Pesqueira
- Ribeira Peixe
- Santa Josefina
- Vila Clotilde
- Vila Malanza

== Politics ==
Caué currently has five seats in the National Assembly.
