= Angra =

Angra may refer to:

== Places ==
- Bay of Angra (Baía de Angra), within Angra do Heroísmo on the Portuguese island of Terceira in the archipelago of the Azores
- Angra do Heroísmo, a municipality in the Azores, Portugal
- Angra dos Reis, a municipality in the state of Rio de Janeiro, Brazil
- Angra Nuclear Power Plant in Brazil
- Angra Pequena or Lüderitz Bay in Namibia, Africa
- Angra Toldo

== Other ==
- Angra (band), a Brazilian power metal band
- Angra (insect), a genus of burrowing bugs in the subfamily Sehirinae
- Angra labeo, species of fish in the family Cyprinidae
- SS Angra, a number of ships with this name
- Angra Mainyu, the destructive spirit (or evil) in the Zoroastrian faith
