= Praia Inhame =

Beach in São Tomé, São Tomé and Príncipe

- Beach
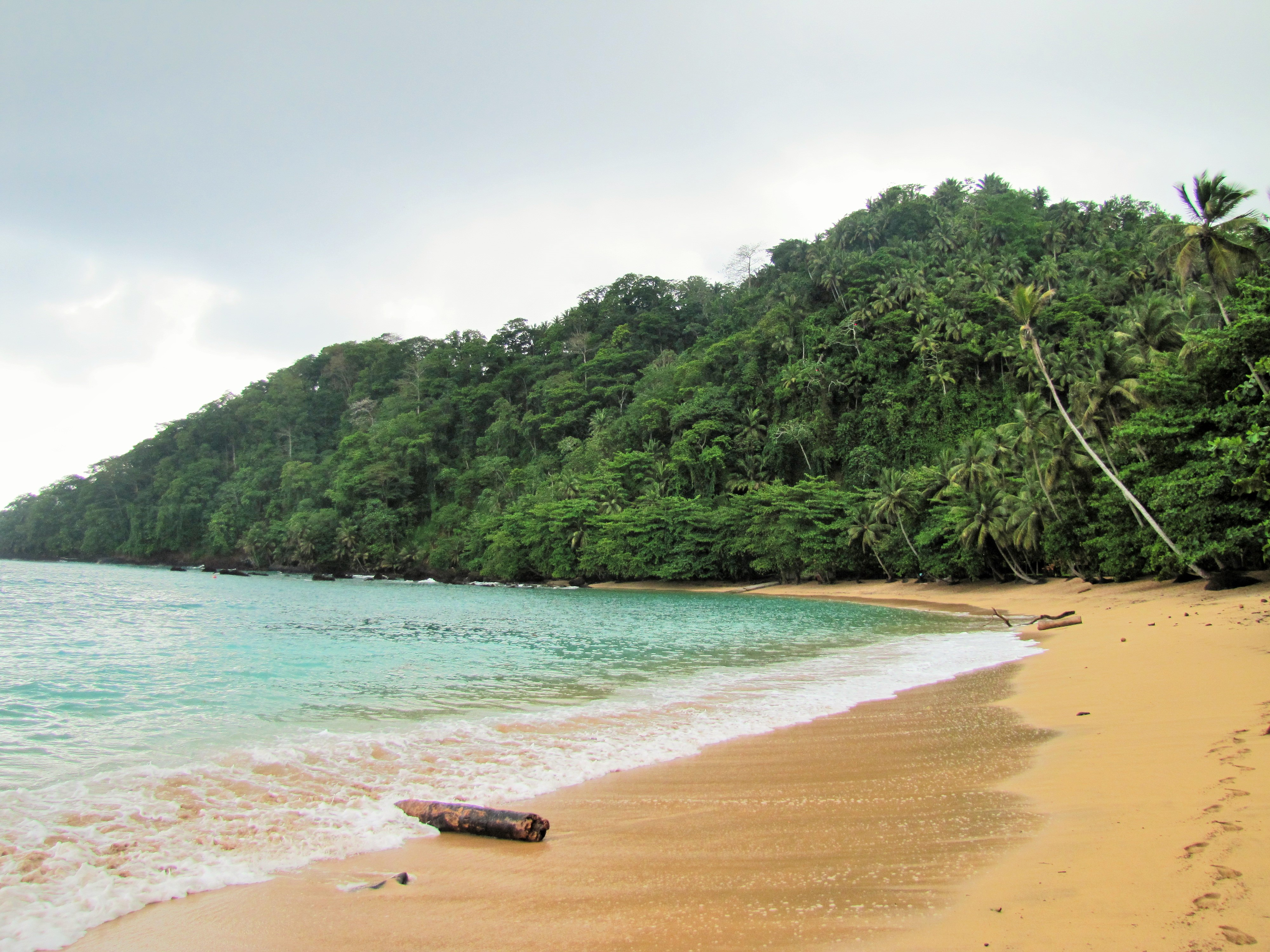
- Praia Inhame

- Praia Inhame
- Coordinates: 0.0248°N 6.5197°E
- Location: Southern island of São Tomé, São Tomé and Príncipe near Porto Alegre

Praia Inhame is a beach in the southernmost part of the island of São Tomé in São Tomé and Príncipe. It lies directly east of the southernmost point of the island, Ponta Homem da Capa, and 2 km southwest of the village Porto Alegre. There is an eco lodge near the beach. The Canal das Rolas separates it from Ilhéu das Rolas.

A new species of snake was found near the beach in 2017. It was named Naja peroescobari, named after the 15th century Portuguese explorer Pêro Escobar.

== See also ==
- List of beaches of São Tomé and Príncipe
