= Tinhosa =

Tinhosa may refer to two islets in São Tomé and Príncipe:

- Tinhosa Grande, an islet in Príncipe Province, São Tomé and Príncipe
- Tinhosa Pequena, an islet in Príncipe Province, São Tomé and Príncipe
