= Vila Clotilde =

- Village
- Location on São Tomé Island
- Coordinates: 0.116°N 6.5932°E
- Country: São Tomé and Príncipe
- Island: São Tomé
- District: Caué

Population (2012)
  - Total: 519
- Time zone: UTC+1 (WAT)

Vila Clotilde is a village in Caué District on São Tomé Island in São Tomé and Príncipe. Its population is 53 (2012 census). Vila Clotilde lies 6.5 km west of São João dos Angolares. 3 km to its west is Pico Cão Grande, an iconic needle-shaped volcanic plug, whose summit is 663 m (2,175 ft) above sea level.

== Population history ==
Historical population
Year	Pop.	±%
2001	455	—
2008	519	+14.1%
2012	53	−89.8%
