= Vila Malanza =

- Village
- Location on São Tomé Island
- Coordinates: 0.0458°N 6.5289°E
- Country: São Tomé and Príncipe
- Island: São Tomé
- District: Caué

Population (2012)
  - Total: 550
- Time zone: UTC+1 (WAT)

Vila Malanza is a village in Caué District on São Tomé Island in São Tomé and Príncipe. Its population is 550 (2012 census). Vila Malanza lies 1.5 km north of Porto Alegre and 17 km southwest of São João dos Angolares.

== Population history ==
Historical population
Year	Pop.	±%
2001	393	—
2008	448	+14.0%
2012	550	+22.8%
