= List of beaches of São Tomé and Príncipe =

São Tomé and Príncipe have a number of beaches.

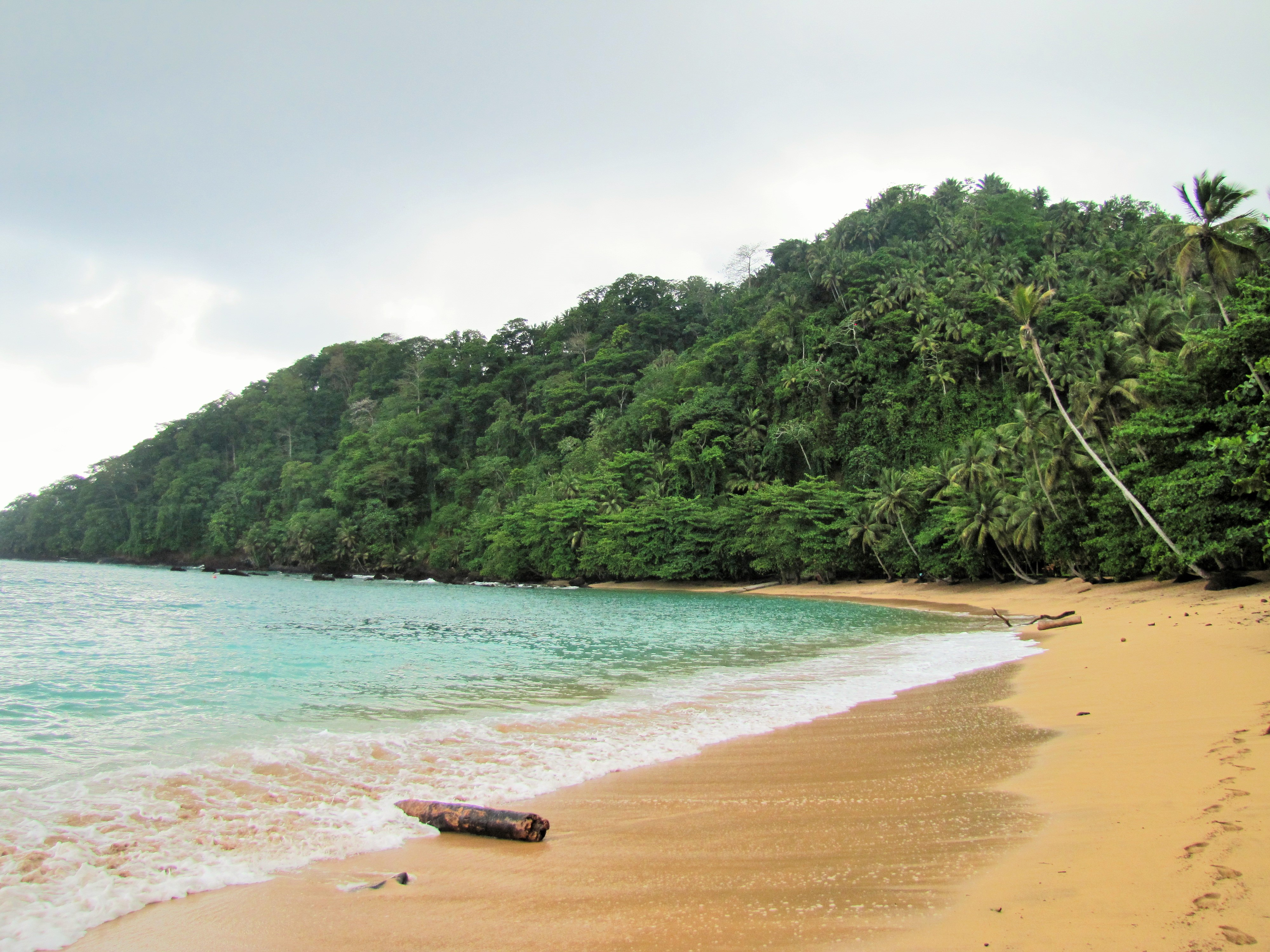
Praia Inhame

== São Tomé ==
Beaches on São Tomé Island include:

- Praia dos Tamarinos
- Praia das Conchas
- Praia Guegue
- Praia Samérica
- Praia da Mutamba
- Praia das Plancas
- Praia Grande
- Praia de Rosema
- Praia das Furnas
- Praia da Moça
- Praia do Fogo
- Praia de Santa Catarina
- Praia Capito
- Praia da Palma
- Praia da Pipa
- Praia da Lança
- Praia Sambangombe
- Praia do Portinho
- Praia Xixi
- Praia Vá Inhá
- Praia Jalé
- Praia da Piscina
- Praia Inhame
- Praia Istanga (Ponta Cavingui)
- Praia Istanga (Ponta Baleia)
- Praia Micondo
- Praia de Monte Mário
- Praia Grande
- Praia Zongonhin
- Praia da Mandioca
- Praia de Diogo Afonso
- Praia Capitango
- Praia Pesqueira
- Praia da Azeitona
- Praia Ió Grande
- Praia do Gato
- Praia Angobó
- Praia de Angra Toldo
- Praia da Colónia Açoriana
- Praia do Morrão
- Praia do Rei
- Praia do Amador
- Praia Congo
- Praia do Almoxarife
- Praia das Pombas
- Praia do Melão
- Praia do Lagarto
- Praia da Nazaré
- Praia Gamboa
- Praia da Cruz
- Praia Còracòra
- Praia Mussacavu
- Praia Martins Mendez
- Praia Picão
- Praia de Algés
- Praia Micoló
- Praia Fernão Dias
- Praia Sete Ondas

== Príncipe ==
Beaches on Príncipe include:

- Praia de Santa Rita
- Praia da Ribeira Izé
- Praia Pequena
- Praia Iõla
- Prainha (Ilha do Príncipe)
- Praia do Caixão
- Praia Formiga
- Praia de São Tomé
- Praia Seca
- Praia Grande
- Praia de Cabinda
- Praia do Boi
- Praia Periguito
- Praia Évora
- Praia do Inhame
- Praia das Bananas
- Praia das Burras

== Ilhéu das Rolas ==
Beaches on Ilhéu das Rolas include:

- Praia Pesqueira
- Praia do Pombo
- Praia da Escada
- Praia de Santo António
