= Santa Josefina, São Tomé and Príncipe =

Santa Josefina
- Village
- Location on São Tomé Island
- Coordinates: 0.0718°N 6.5288°E
- Country: São Tomé and Príncipe
- Island: São Tomé
- District: Caué

Population (2008)
  - Total: 17
- Time zone: UTC+1 (WAT)

Santa Josefina (Portuguese for Saint Josephine) is a village in the southern part of São Tomé Island in São Tomé and Príncipe. Its population is 17 (2008 est.). It lies 4 km north of Porto Alegre.

== Population history ==
Historical population
Year	Pop.	±%
2001	15	—
2008	17	+13.3%
