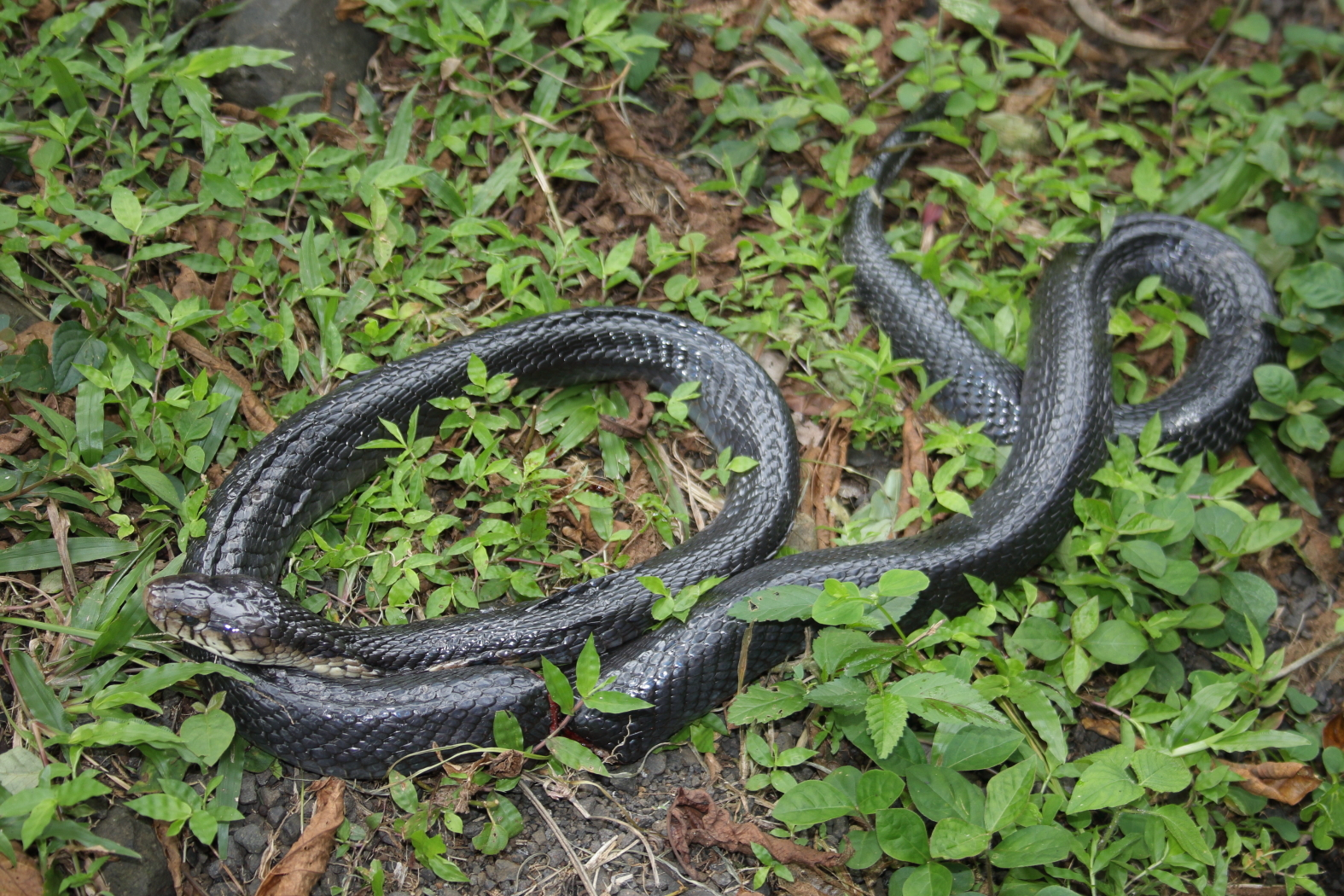

Conservation status
- Endangered (IUCN 3.1)

Scientific classification
- Kingdom: Animalia
- Phylum: Chordata
- Class: Reptilia
- Order: Squamata
- Suborder: Serpentes
- Family: Elapidae
- Genus: Naja
- Species: N. peroescobari

Binomial name
- Naja peroescobari Ceríaco, Marques, Schmitz & Bauer, 2017

= Naja peroescobari =

Species of snake

Naja peroescobari, the São Tomé island forest cobra or Pero Escobar's cobra, is a species of snake in the family Elapidae.

It was previously considered to be the same species as the forest cobra (Naja melanoleuca) found on the African mainland, and was believed to have been introduced by Portuguese settlers to limit the proliferation of rats. In 2017 it was discovered to be a different species endemic to the island of São Tomé, São Tomé and Príncipe. The holotype was found near the beach Praia Inhame, southwest of Porto Alegre. It is named after the Portuguese explorer Pêro Escobar.

Naja peroescobari is one of the few predators on the island of terrestrial mammals such as black rats (Rattus rattus) and least weasels (Mustela nivalis). Not much is known about the venom of this species, but it likely has slightly cytotoxic and neurotoxic properties.
