= Pedras Tinhosas =

Coordinates: 1°22′N 7°17′E

Designations

Ramsar Wetland
- Official name: Ilots Tinhosas
- Designated: 21 August 2006
- Reference no.: 1632

Pedras Tinhosas is a small archipelago of two uninhabited islets, Tinhosa Grande and Tinhosa Pequena, south-west of the island of Príncipe in the Atlantic Ocean. Since 2012, it has formed part of UNESCO's Island of Príncipe Biosphere Reserve, which includes the island of Príncipe and the surrounding islets.

== Environment ==
Both islets are covered with brushwood, and serve as a nesting ground for a wide variety of sea birds, including Anous stolidus, Anous minutus, Onychoprion fuscatus, white-tailed tropic bird (Phaethon lepturus) and the brown booby (Sula leucogaster). The islets have been recognised as an Important Bird Area (IBA) by BirdLife International for their seabird colonies.
