= Monte Mário =

- Village
- Location on São Tomé Island
- Coordinates: 0.0592°N 6.5548°E
- Country: São Tomé and Príncipe
- Island: São Tomé
- District: Caué

Population (2012)
  - Total: 200
- Time zone: UTC+1 (WAT)

Monte Mário is a settlement in Caué District on São Tomé Island in São Tomé and Príncipe. Its population is 200 (2012 census). The locality lies 5 km northeast of Porto Alegre.

== Population history ==
Historical population
Year	Pop.	±%
2001	172	—
2008	196	+14.0%
2012	200	+2.0%
