= Pestana Equador =

Beach resort in São Tomé and Príncipe

Coordinates: 0°0′19″S 6°31′35″E

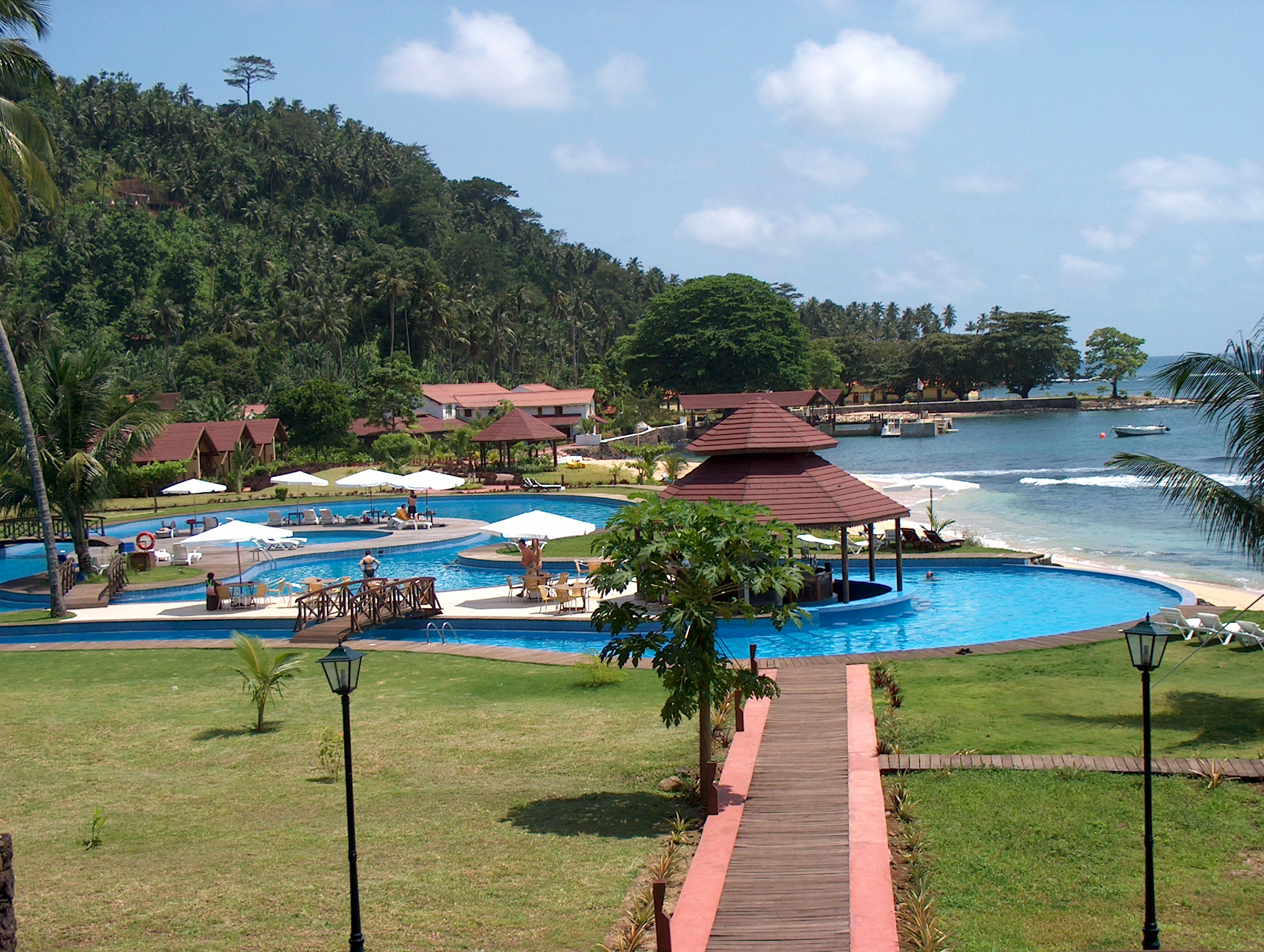
Pestana Equador or the Equador Resort

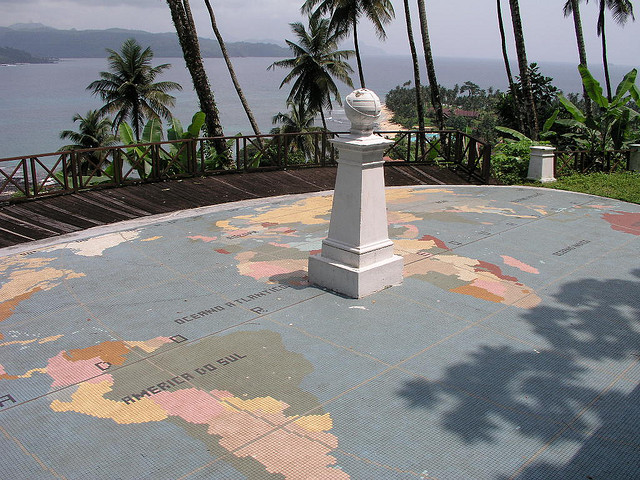
Mark of the Equator erected by Gago Coutinho southwest of the resort and the view of São Tomé Island

The Pestana Equador is a beach resort on the Ilhéu das Rolas, at the southern tip of São Tomé and Príncipe. It is owned and operated by the Pestana Group of hotels and resorts. It is one of the very few resorts on Earth that crosses the equator and lies in two hemispheres. The area forms the settlement of Ilhéu das Rolas.

The resort lies just north of the equator, and is 60 km from the capital city, São Tomé. The resort can only be accessed by boat, departing from Ponta Baleia on the island of São Tomé. It is in the area in that portion the very tiniest part of the country being in the Southern Hemisphere.

The resort has a monument of the marcation of the equator, right on the equator marking the division of the northern and the southern hemispheres, southwest of the resort.
