= Dona Augusta, São Tomé and Príncipe =

Dona Augusta
- Village
- Location on São Tomé Island
- Coordinates: 0°6′20″N 6°37′30″E
- Country: São Tomé and Príncipe
- Island: São Tomé
- District: Caué

Population (2012)
  - Total: 166
- Time zone: UTC+1 (WAT)

Dona Augusta is a village on São Tomé Island in São Tomé and Príncipe. Its population is 166 (2012 census). Dona Augusta is located 4 km southwest of São João dos Angolares and 1 km northeast of Praia Pesqueira.

== Population history ==
Historical population
Year	Pop.	±%
2001	168	—
2008	191	+13.7%
2012	166	−13.1%
