= Praia Pesqueira =

- Village
- Location on São Tomé Island
- Coordinates: 0.0981°N 6.6226°E
- Country: São Tomé and Príncipe
- Island: São Tomé
- District: Caué

Population (2012)
  - Total: 201
- Time zone: UTC+1 (WAT)

Praia Pesqueira is a seaside village in Caué District on São Tomé Island in São Tomé and Príncipe. Its population is 201 (2012 census). The locality is located just south of Dona Augusta and 5 km southwest of São João dos Angolares.

== Population history ==
Historical population
Year	Pop.	±%
2001	181	—
2008	206	+13.8%
2012	201	−2.4%
