= Canal das Rolas =

Strait of the Atlantic Ocean

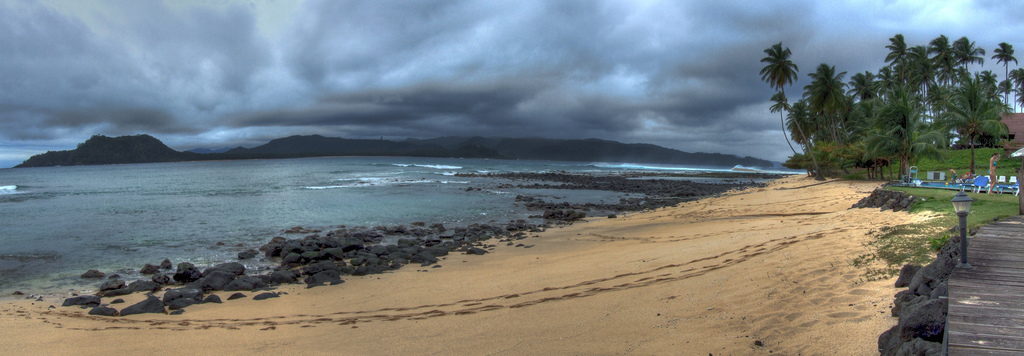
- Canal das Rolas as seen from Ilhéu das Rolas

- Location in São Tomé and Príncipe
- Coordinates: 0.01°N 6.52°E
- Ocean/sea sources: Atlantic Ocean
- Basin countries: São Tomé and Príncipe
- Max. width: 1.2 nmi (2.2 km; 1.4 mi)
- Islands: Ilhéu das Rolas

The Canal das Rolas ("Rolas Channel") is a strait of the Atlantic Ocean separating the small Ilhéu das Rolas (also: Ilhéu Gago Coutinho) from the southernmost point of the island of São Tomé, in São Tomé and Príncipe. It is 1.2 nautical miles (2.2 km; 1.4 mi) wide. There is a ferry departing from Ponta Baleia on São Tomé Island to Ilhéu das Rolas.
