= Richard Greeff =

German zoologist

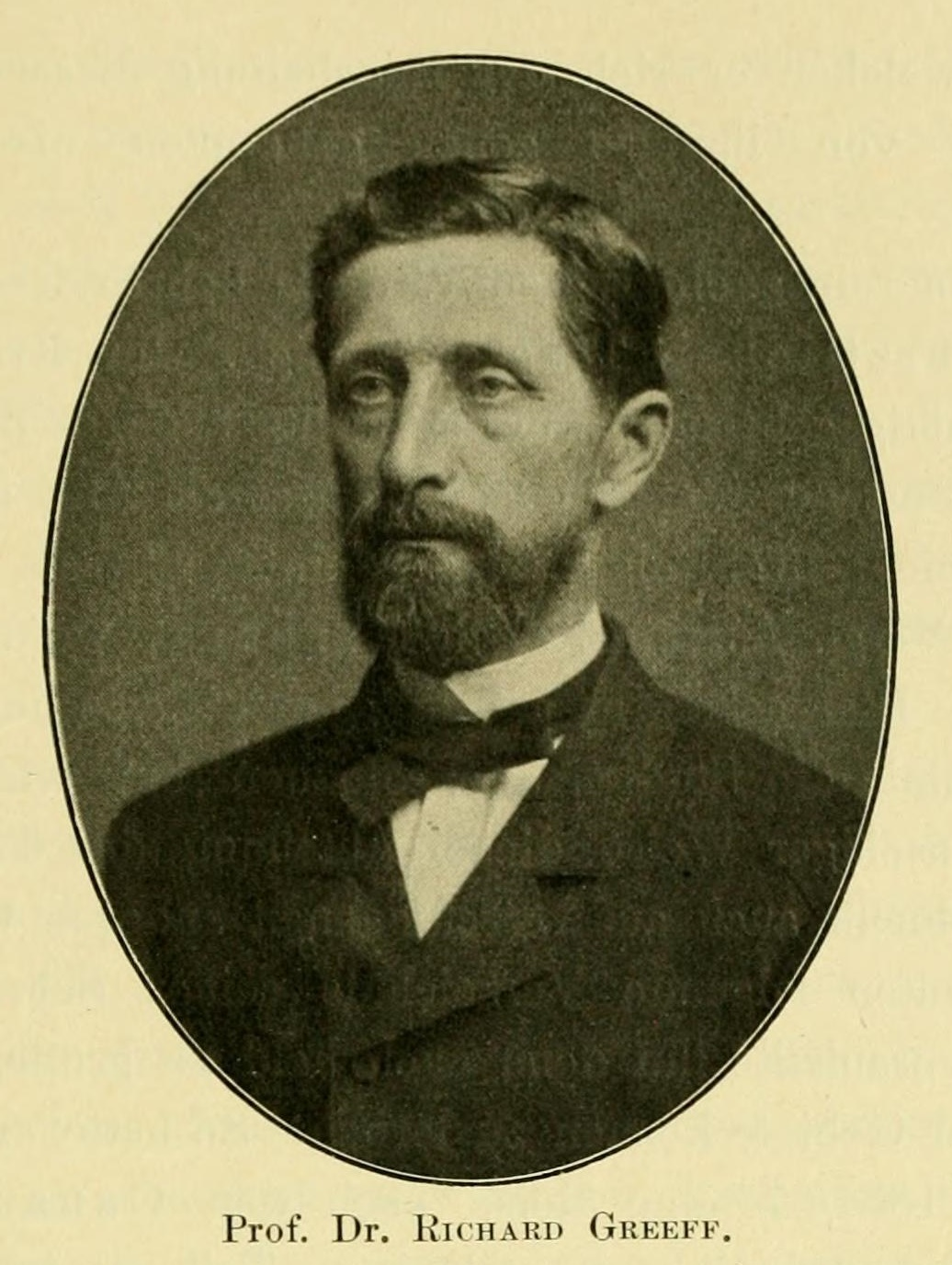

Richard Greeff (14 March 1828, Elberfeld – 30 August 1892, Marburg) was a German zoologist.

He studied medicine in Würzburg, Heidelberg and Berlin, receiving his medical doctorate in 1857. Following graduation, he worked as a hospital assistant in Danzig, returning to Elberfeld in 1859 as a physician. Soon afterwards he quit his medical practice in favor of zoological research, subsequently obtaining his habilitation for zoology at the University of Bonn in 1863. In 1871 he succeeded Carl Friedrich Wilhelm Claus as professor of zoology and comparative anatomy at the University of Marburg.

He traveled extensively during his career, conducting zoological investigations in Portugal, the Adriatic Coast, the African tropics and the Canary Islands. Inspired by the work of Bonn professor Max Schultze, he focused his attention on the anatomical construction and reproductive behaviour of protozoa, especially Rhizopoda. He also made significant contributions in his research of annelids and echinoderms.

The nematode genus Greeffiella is named after him, as are species with the epithet of greeffii, e.g. Acinetoides greeffii.

A species of gecko, Hemidactylus greeffii, was named in his honor in 1886 by Portuguese zoologist José Vicente Barbosa du Bocage.

== Selected works ==
- Untersuchungen über den Bau und die Naturgeschichte von Echinorhynchus miliarius Zenker (E. polymorphus), 1864 - Research on the construction and natural history of Echinorhynchus polymorphus.
- Reise nach den Canarischen Inseln, 1868 - Journey to the Canary Islands.
- Madeira und die canarischen Inseln in naturwissenschaftlicher besonders zoologischer Beziehung, 1872 - Madeira and the Canary Islands in regards to natural sciences, especially zoological relationships.
- Ueber pelagische anneliden von der küste der Canarischen inseln, 1879 - On pelagic annelids off the coasts of the Canary Islands.
- Studien über Protozoen, 1888 - Study of Protozoa.

== Taxon described by him ==
- See Category:Taxa named by Richard Greeff
