= Angra Toldo =

- Village
- Location on São Tomé Island
- Coordinates: 0.1577°N 6.6707°E
- Country: São Tomé and Príncipe
- Island: São Tomé
- District: Caué

Population (2012)
  - Total: 433
- Time zone: UTC+1 (WAT)

Angra Toldo is a village in Caué District on São Tomé Island in São Tomé and Príncipe. Its population is 433 (2012 census). It is located on the coast, northeast of São João dos Angolares and southwest of Ribeira Afonso.

== Population history ==
Historical population
Year	Pop.	±%
2001	260	—
2008	296	+13.8%
2012	433	+46.3%
