= Greeff's giant gecko =

Conservation status
- Near Threatened (IUCN 3.1)

Scientific classification
- Kingdom: Animalia
- Phylum: Chordata
- Class: Reptilia
- Order: Squamata
- Suborder: Gekkota
- Family: Gekkonidae
- Genus: Hemidactylus
- Species: H. greeffii

Binomial name
- Hemidactylus greeffii Bocage, 1886

Species of lizard

Greeff's giant gecko (Hemidactylus greeffii), also known commonly as Greeff's gecko, is a species of lizard in the family Gekkonidae. The species is found on islands in the Gulf of Guinea off the west coast of Africa.

== Etymology ==
The specific name, greeffii, is in honor of German zoologist Richard Greeff, who collected the holotype when he lived on São Tomé Island in 1879–1880.

== Geographic range ==
H. greeffii is endemic to the island of São Tomé and the associated islet of Ilhéu das Rolas, both in the nation of São Tomé and Príncipe. It does not occur on the island of Príncipe.

== Habitat ==
H. greeffii is found at altitudes from sea level to 1,400 m (4,600 ft). Although its natural habitat at these elevations has been disturbed, it is still found on tree trunks, stone walls, concrete structures such as culverts and tunnels, and on the exterior of buildings. Unlike other gecko species, it does not live inside inhabited houses.

== Reproduction ==
H. greeffii is oviparous.

== Taxonomy ==
The species H. greeffii was described and named by José Vicente Barbosa du Bocage in 1886.
