= Trachylepis adamastor =

Scientific classification
- Kingdom: Animalia
- Phylum: Chordata
- Class: Reptilia
- Order: Squamata
- Family: Scincidae
- Genus: Trachylepis
- Species: T. adamastor

Binomial name
- Trachylepis adamastor Ceriaco, 2015

Species of lizard

The Adamastor skink (Trachylepis adamastor) is a species of skink in the family Scincidae. The species is endemic to the some 20-hectare islet of Tinhosa Grande southwest of Príncipe in São Tomé and Príncipe. It was first described in 2015.
