= Pico Cão Grande =

Geographic landmark in São Tomé and Príncipe

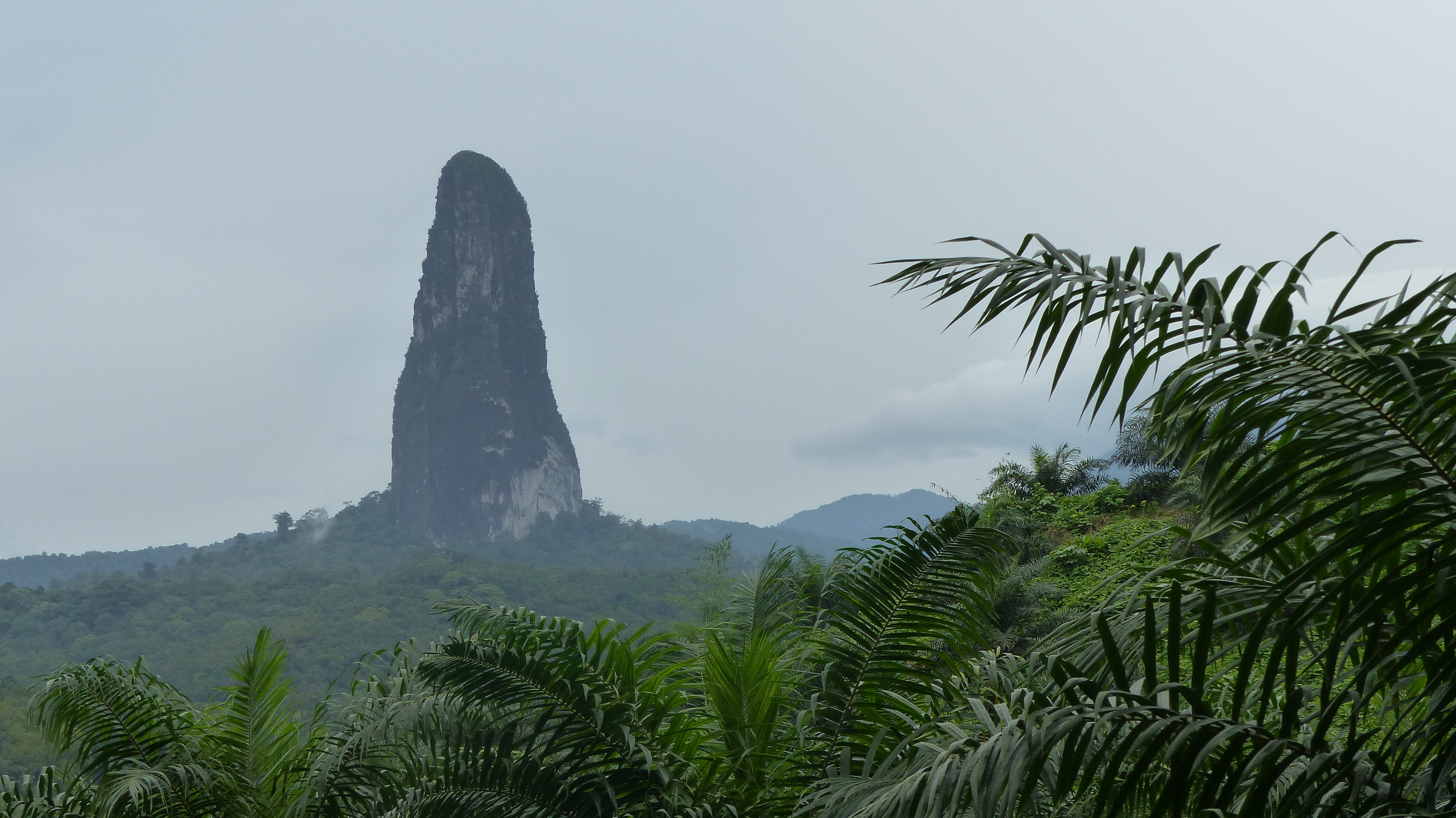
- Pico Cao Grande in 2014.

Highest point
- Elevation: 663 m (2,175 ft)
- Prominence: 370 m (1,210 ft)
- Coordinates: 0°7′05″N 6°33′59″E

Geography
- Location within São Tomé
- Location: São Tomé Island, São Tomé and Príncipe

Geology
- Mountain type: Volcanic plug

Climbing
- First ascent: February 1991 by Japanese Group of climbers.

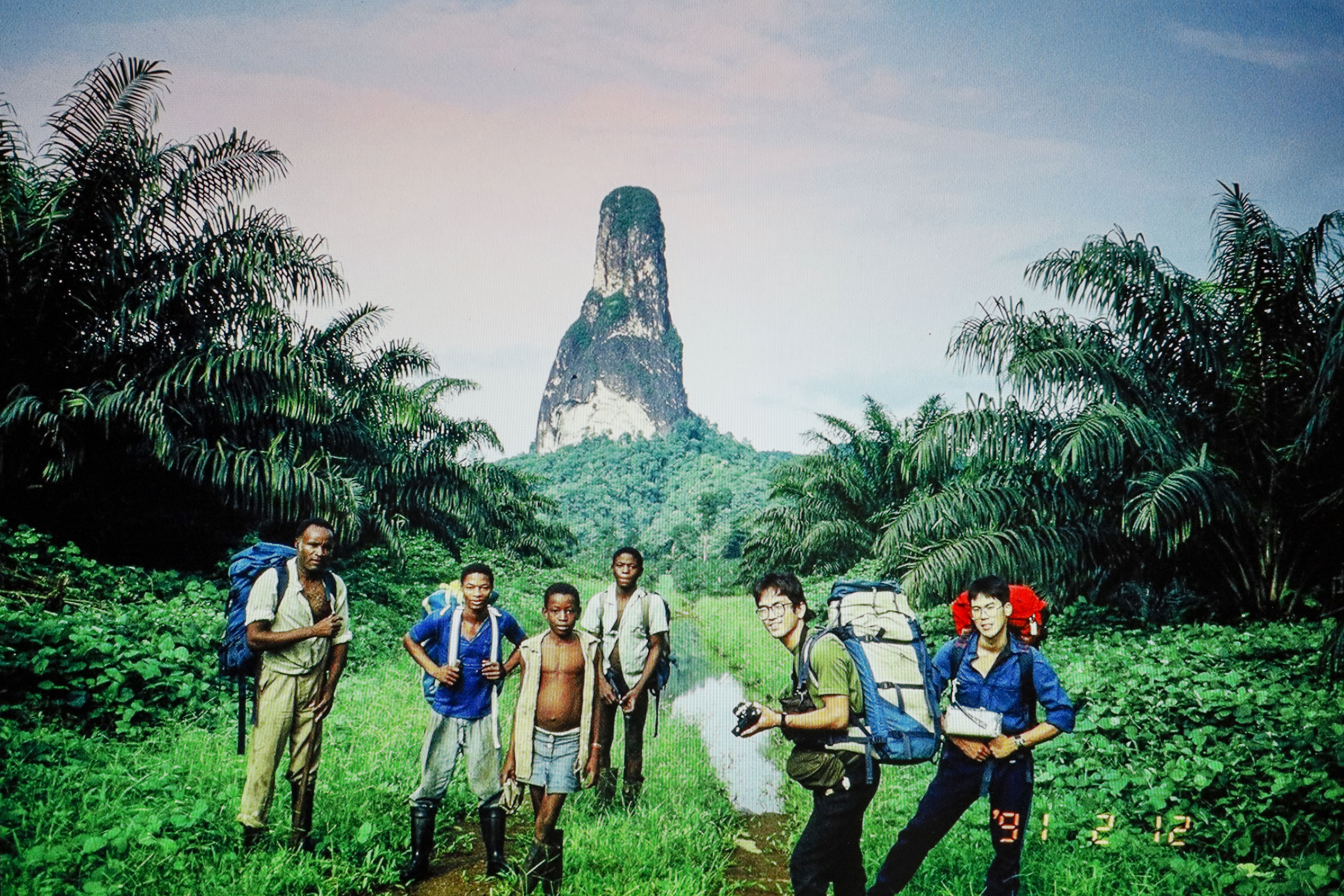
Japanese climbers on their way to the summit in 1991 (Naotoshi Agata on the right, Kenichi Moriyama second from the right)

The Pico Cão Grande (Portuguese for "Great Dog Peak") is a landmark needle-shaped volcanic plug peak in São Tomé and Príncipe, in the Caué District of São Tomé Island in Parque Natural Obô de São Tomé. Its summit is 663 m (2,175 ft) above sea level, and it rises about 370 m (1,210 ft) over the surrounding terrain. The volcanic plug was formed by magma solidifying in the vent of an active volcano. The nearest village is Vila Clotilde, 3 km to the east. The district seat São João dos Angolares is 9 km to the east.

== Geology ==
The volcanic plug is a relatively recent phenomenon, having formed as part of the Cameroon line of volcanoes roughly three and a half million years ago in the Pliocene. Its composition is mainly phonolite (also called clinkstone in vernacular English).

== Rock climbing ==
The moss growing on the rocks due to high moisture content, and the presence of snakes, make climbing here very difficult.

The first attempt to climb Pico Cão Grande was made in 1975 by a Portuguese team of climbers. However, the first successful ascent was achieved in February 1991 by a Japanese team consisting of Yosuke Takahashi, Kenichi Moriyama, and Naotoshi Agata.

In June 2016, Gareth Leah, from England, and Sergio Almada, from Mexico, established a new bolt-protected route on the peak. The pair spent four weeks on the peak producing a route which they named Nubivagant ("ascent into the clouds"). The route is 15 pitches (455 metres) in length and is graded F8b (5.13d). They climbed all but three pitches clean. The route is both extremely long and technically very demanding, and their climb was plagued with difficulties, including snakebites and blown battery chargers. The most difficult portions of the climb are in the first 100 meters, after which the difficulty drops considerably.

In July 2018, the Spanish brothers Iker and Eneko Pou completed a multi-day team redpoint ascent of a new route. They established the route ground up and without use of aid or removable bolts. The route is called Leve Leve and graded F8b+ (5.14a). They were also able to make the first all-free ascent of Nubivagant in team redpoint style over two days. This was followed two weeks later by another all-free ascent by a team of Americans, Sam Daulton and Remy Franklin.

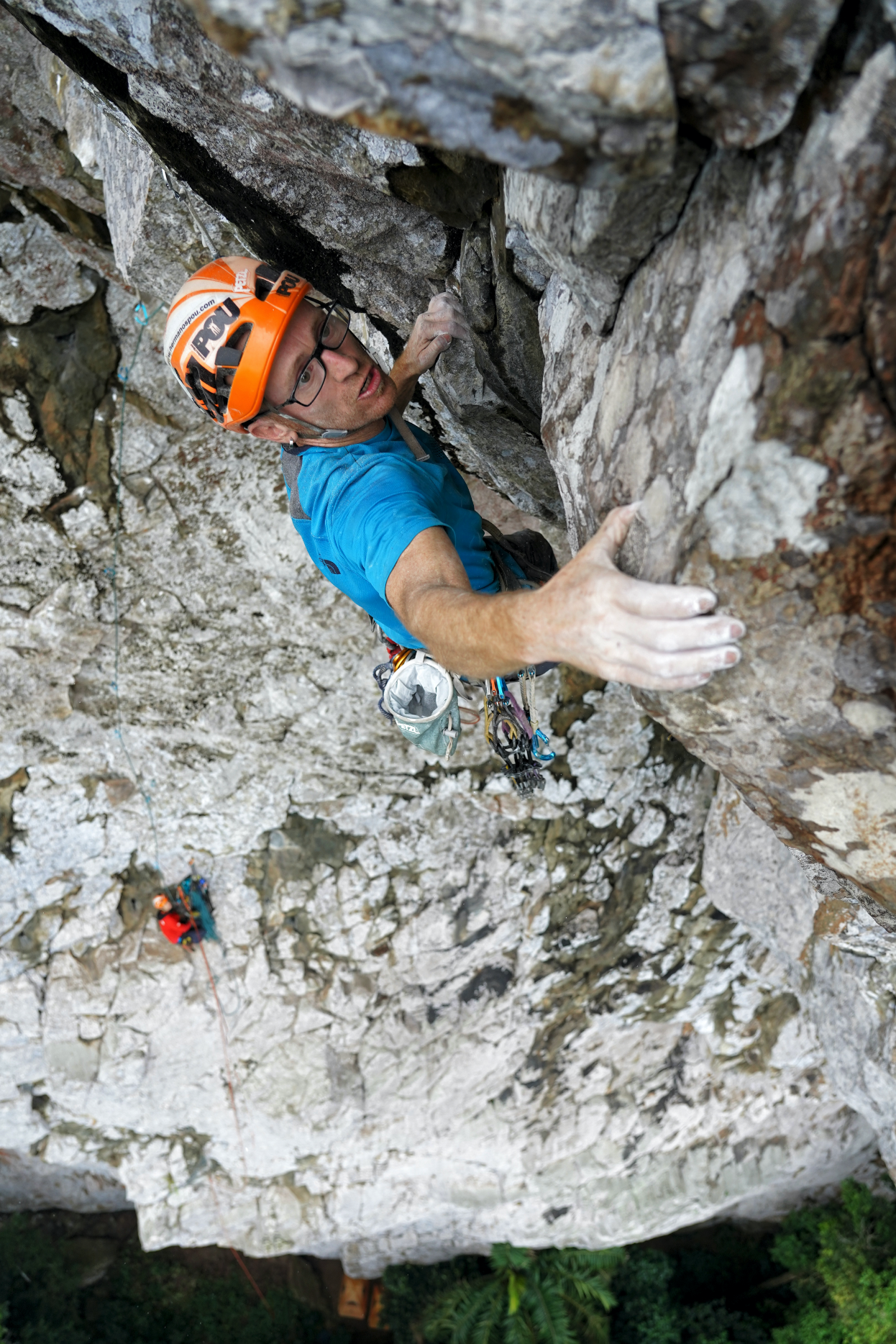
Iker Pou making the FA of Leve Leve (8b+, 450 m) on Pico Cão Grande (pitch 3)
