= Ponta Baleia =

- Village
- Location on São Tomé Island
- Coordinates: 0.0382°N 6.5476°E
- Country: São Tomé and Príncipe
- Island: São Tomé
- District: Caué

Population (2012)
  - Total: 43
- Time zone: UTC+1 (WAT)

Ponta Baleia (Portuguese for "whale point") is a headland and a settlement in the south of Caué District on São Tomé Island in São Tomé and Príncipe. Its population is 43 (2012 census). The locality lies 1.5 km east of Porto Alegre and 2 km southeast of Vila Malanza. A ferry goes from Ponta Baleia to Ilhéu das Rolas.

== Population history ==
Historical population
Year	Pop.	±%
2001	127	—
2008	145	+14.2%
2012	43	−70.3%
