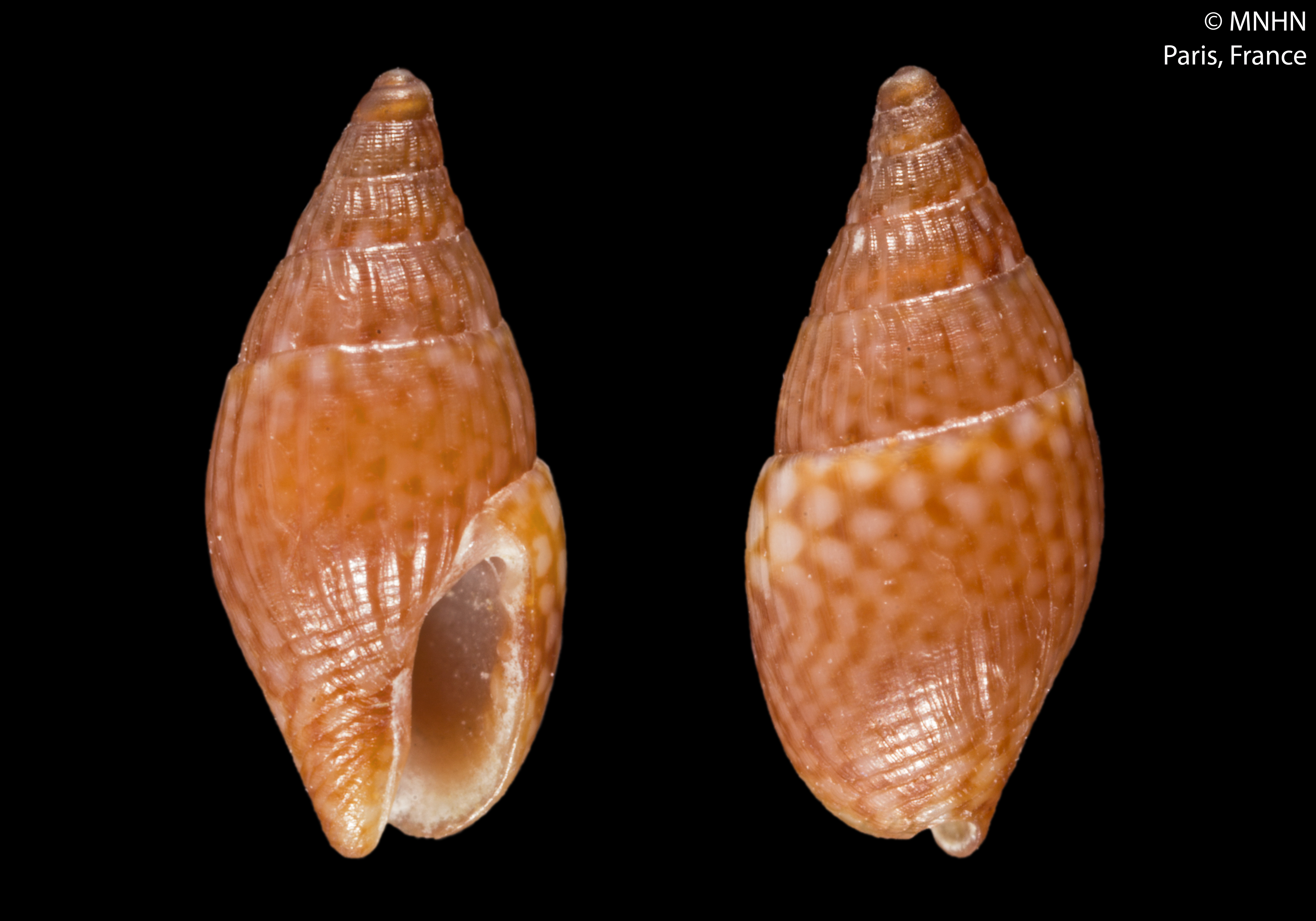
- Shell of Anachis xani (holotype at MNHN, Paris)

Scientific classification
- Kingdom: Animalia
- Phylum: Mollusca
- Class: Gastropoda
- Subclass: Caenogastropoda
- Order: Neogastropoda
- Family: Columbellidae
- Genus: Anachis
- Species: A. xani

Binomial name
- Anachis xani Rolán & Gori, 2012

= Anachis xani =

Species of gastropod

Anachis xani is a species of sea snail in the family Columbellidae, the dove snails. It was first described by Emilio Rolán and Sandro Gori in 2012.

== Description ==
The length of the shell is 5 mm.

== Distribution ==
This species is found in the Gulf of Guinea.
