= Ilhéu dos Mosteiros =

Islet in São Tomé and Príncipe

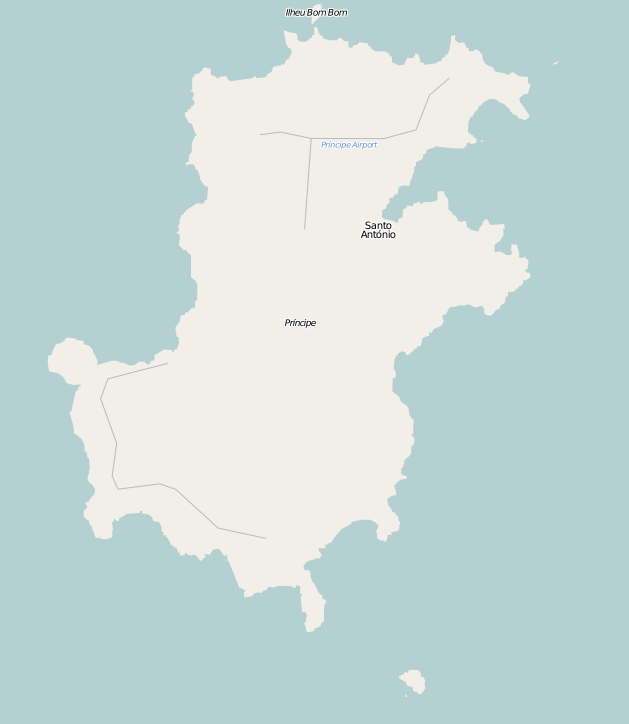
- Location off Príncipe Island

Geography
- Location: North of the island of Príncipe, São Tomé and Príncipe near Bom Bom
- Coordinates: 1.6845°N 7.4691°E
- Highest elevation: 20 m (70 ft)

Administration
- São Tomé and Príncipe

Demographics
- Population: 0

Ilhéu dos Mosteiros is an uninhabited islet in the Gulf of Guinea, part of São Tomé and Príncipe. It lies about 0.8 km off the northeast coast of the island of Príncipe. It is 20 metres high. Since 2012, the islet forms a part of Island of Príncipe Biosphere Reserve.

The islet is known for its striking volcanic rock formations.
