= Pedra da Galé =

Islet of São Tomé and Príncipe

- Location off Príncipe Island

Geography
- Location: North of the island of Príncipe, São Tomé and Príncipe near Bom Bom
- Coordinates: 1.7254°N 7.3802°E
- Highest elevation: 4 m (13 ft)

Administration
- São Tomé and Príncipe

Demographics
- Population: 0

Pedra da Galé is an uninhabited islet in the Gulf of Guinea, part of São Tomé and Príncipe. It lies 3.7 km west-northwest the north coast of the island of Príncipe. It is 190 meters long and up to 60 meters wide in its northern part, and four meters high. Since 2012, the islet forms a part of the Island of Príncipe Biosphere Reserve.
