= Island of Príncipe Biosphere Reserve =

Biosphere reserve in Sao Tome and Principe

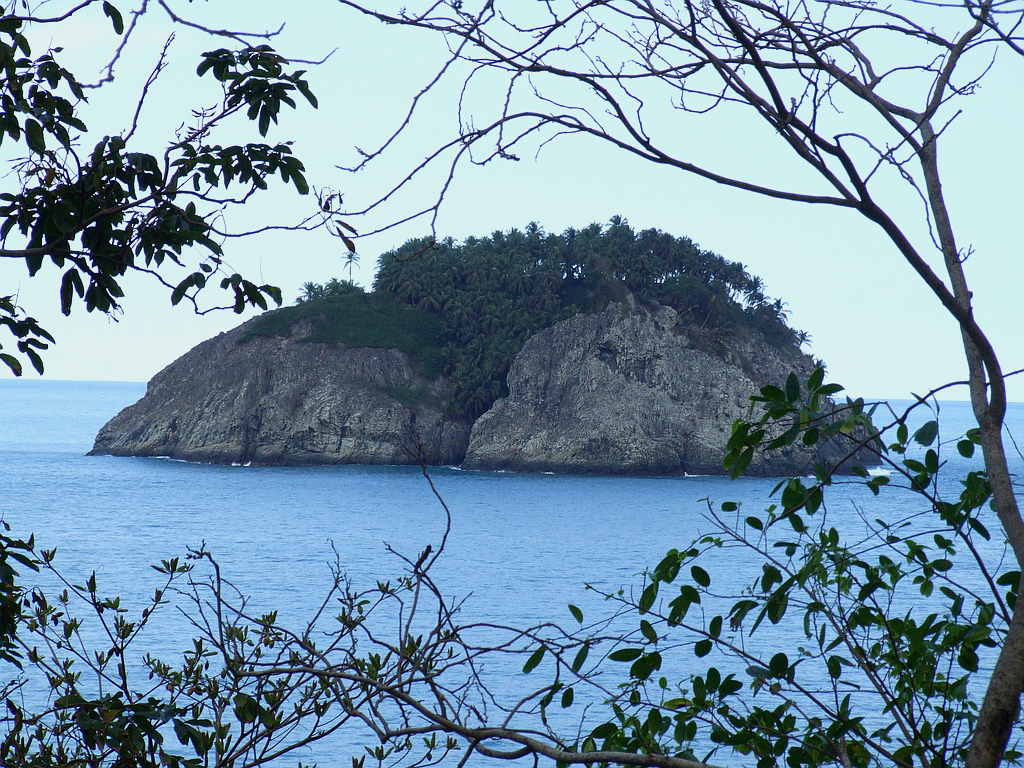
- Ilhéu Santana (Islet of Santana)

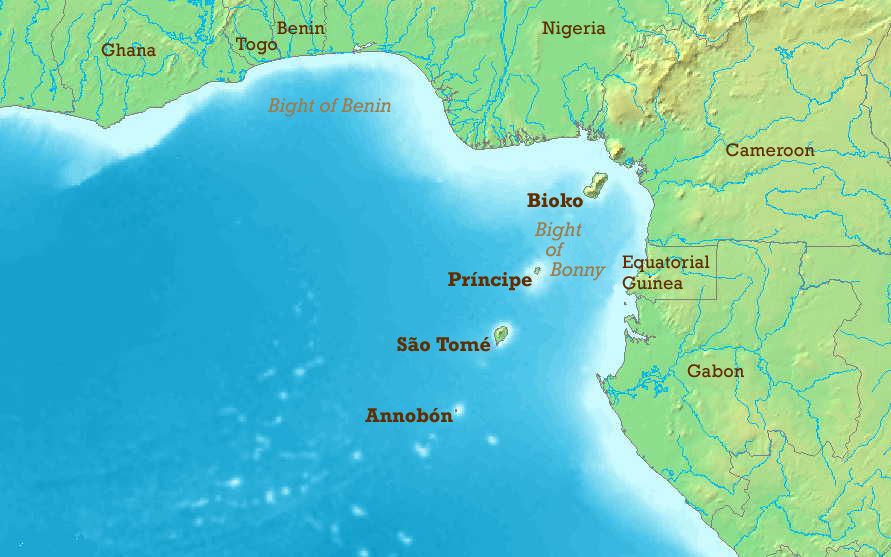
- Location of Príncipe in the Gulf of Guinea
- Location: São Tomé and Príncipe
- Coordinates: 1°35′N 7°23′E
- Area: 71,592.56 hectares (276.4204 sq mi)
- Established: 2012
- Governing body: Região Autónoma do Príncipe

The Island of Príncipe Biosphere Reserve (established 2012) is a UNESCO Biosphere Reserve in São Tomé and Príncipe. It encompasses the entire emerged area of the island of Príncipe, its islets Bom Bom, Boné do Jóquei, Mosteiros, and Pedra da Galé, and the Tinhosas islands (Tinhosa Grande and Tinhosa Pequena) as well as surrounding marine habitats. The reserve is located in the Gulf of Guinea off the west coast of Africa, and is managed by the regional government of Príncipe.

The surface area of the reserve is 71,592.5 hectares (276.420 sq mi), subdivided as follows:

- Core area: 17,242.37 hectares (66.57 sq mi) [marine 11,198.55 hectares (43.24 sq mi); land 6,043.82 hectares (23.34 sq mi)]
- Buffer zone: 11,769.92 hectares (45.44 sq mi) [marine 10,323.18 hectares (39.86 sq mi); land 1,446.74 hectares (5.59 sq mi)]
- Transition area: 42,580.27 hectares (164.40 sq mi) [marine 36,081.76 hectares (139.31 sq mi); land 6,498.51 hectares (25.09 sq mi)]

== Ecological characteristics ==
The island is characterized by its gentle relief in the northern half of the island and a mountain range in the southern half composed of several phonolitic peaks with altitudes between 500 and 948 meters (1,640 and 3,110 ft) where there is a patch of primary rainforest. The difference in geomorphology and terrain between the two sides, results in differentiated bioclimatology, and has influenced in the distribution of major types of ecosystems of the island, such as lotic (river) systems in the area of the massif and its valleys and lentic (lake) systems in the northern plains area.

The biosphere reserve is home to great biodiversity in terrestrial as well as in marine ecosystems, with high rates of endemism in many groups of organisms, especially vascular plants, molluscs, insects, birds, reptiles and bats. It is part of the biodiversity hotspot of tropical forests of West Africa, containing a wide range of plant communities and habitats of high international importance such as primary tropical forests, forest shade, palm trees and lowland riparian habitats.

Considering the importance that this area has for the reproduction of sea turtles, seabirds and cetaceans, as well as coral reefs, on the international scene, it is an area of great interest for the conservation of global biological diversity.

== Socio-economic characteristics ==
As of September 2012, the resident population in the reserve was 6.737 inhabitants, all of whom live in the transition zone as all the islets are uninhabited.

The economic activities in the biosphere reserve are essentially fishing and agriculture (especially cocoa, coffee and copra) besides a small tourist development, mainly composed of some tourism in the capital of Santo Antonio and an island resort in the area of Bom Bom. Agriculture and fisheries are mainly subsistence activities, particularly for consumption and trade surpluses in the local market. Agricultural and fish products are mainly consumed in their primary form, but there are some processed products such as dried fish, fried bananas, the “cacharamba” (local sugar cane rum) and palm wine.

== Sources ==
This article incorporates text from a free content work (license statement/permission). Text taken from UNESCO - MAB Biosphere Reserves Directory, UNESCO, UNESCO.
