= Tinhosa Pequena =

Islet in São Tomé and Príncipe

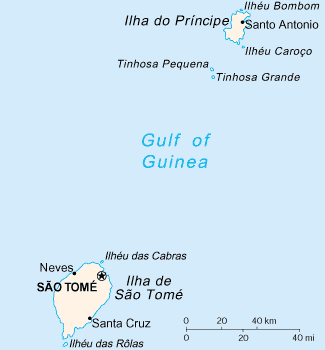
- Map of São Tomé and Príncipe with Tinhosa Pequena on the top

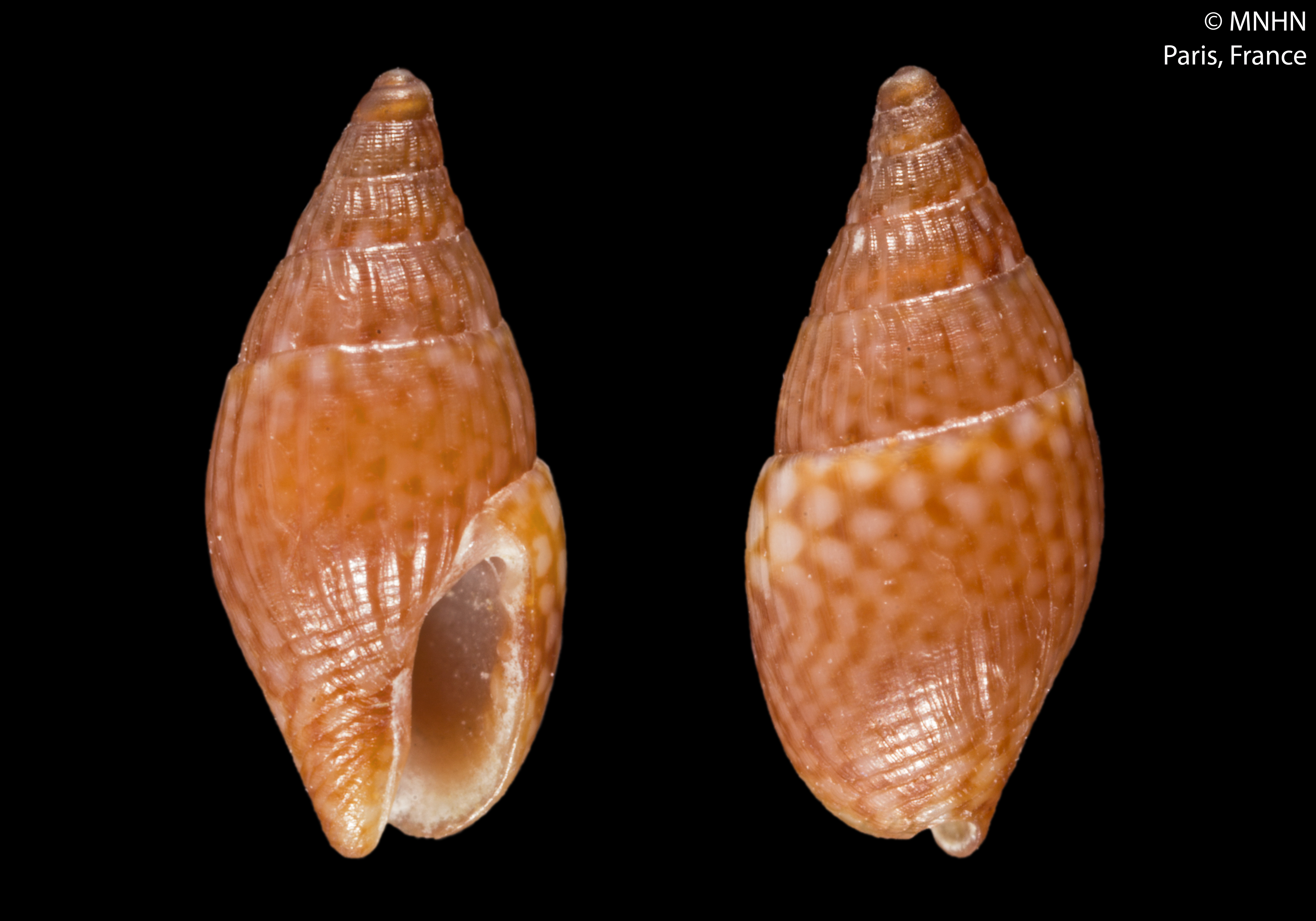
- Anachis xani, found on the island

Geography
- Location: São Tomé and Príncipe, SW of Príncipe
- Coordinates: 1.3829°N 7.2833°E
- Area: 0.03 km^{2} (0.012 sq mi)
- Highest elevation: 64 m (210 ft)

Administration
- São Tomé and Príncipe

Demographics
- Population: 0

Tinhosa Pequena is an uninhabited islet in São Tomé and Príncipe, located 20 km (12 mi) southwest of the island of Príncipe and 127 km (79 mi) northeast of the island of São Tomé. Together with the larger islet Tinhosa Grande, 4 kilometers to its south, it forms the Pedras Tinhosas group. The islet rises to 64 metres, and its area is 3 hectares (7.4 acres).

Since 2012, it has formed part of the UNESCO Island of Príncipe Biosphere Reserve (also known as Príncipe Biosphere Reserve as it encompasses its surrounding islands).
