= SS Angra =

A number of steamships were named Angra, including:

- SS Angra (1911), a coaster in service in 1919
- SS Angra (1915), a cargo ship in service 1928–33
- SS Angra (1920), a tanker in service 1938–42
