= Ilhéu Quixibá =

Ilhéu Quixiba
- Location off São Tomé Island

Geography
- Location: Southeast of the island of São Tomé, São Tomé and Príncipe
- Coordinates: 0.0733°N 6.5861°E

Administration
- São Tomé and Príncipe

Demographics
- Population: 0

Ilhéu Quixibá is an uninhabited islet in the Gulf of Guinea and is one of the smaller islands of São Tomé and Príncipe. The islet lies 0.3 km off the southeast coast of the island of São Tomé. Located 375 m southeast of the southernmost part of São Tomé Island, the triangular shaped islet is covered by forest.
