= Porto Alegre, São Tomé and Príncipe =

Porto Alegre
- Village
- Location on São Tomé Island
- Coordinates: 0°2′N 6°32′E
- Country: São Tomé and Príncipe
- Island: São Tomé
- District: Caué

Population (2012)
  - Total: 795
- Time zone: UTC+1 (WAT)

Porto Alegre (Portuguese for "Happy Port") is a village in Caué District on São Tomé Island in São Tomé and Príncipe. Its population is 795 (2012 census). Porto Alegre lies 2.5 km northeast of the southernmost point of São Tomé Island, Ponta Homem da Capa. It is 1.5 km west of Ponta Baleia, 17 km southwest of São João dos Angolares and 40 km southwest of the capital São Tomé.

Across the Canal das Rolas lies the Ilhéu das Rolas.

On the east side of Ponta Homem da Capa is the beach Praia Inhame. The plantation complex Roça de Porto Alegre was established around 1890 by Jacinto Carneiro de Sousa e Almeida. The oldest preserved building dates from 1918.

== Population history ==
Historical population
Year	Pop.	±%
2001	461	—
2008	525	+13.9%
2012	795	+51.4%

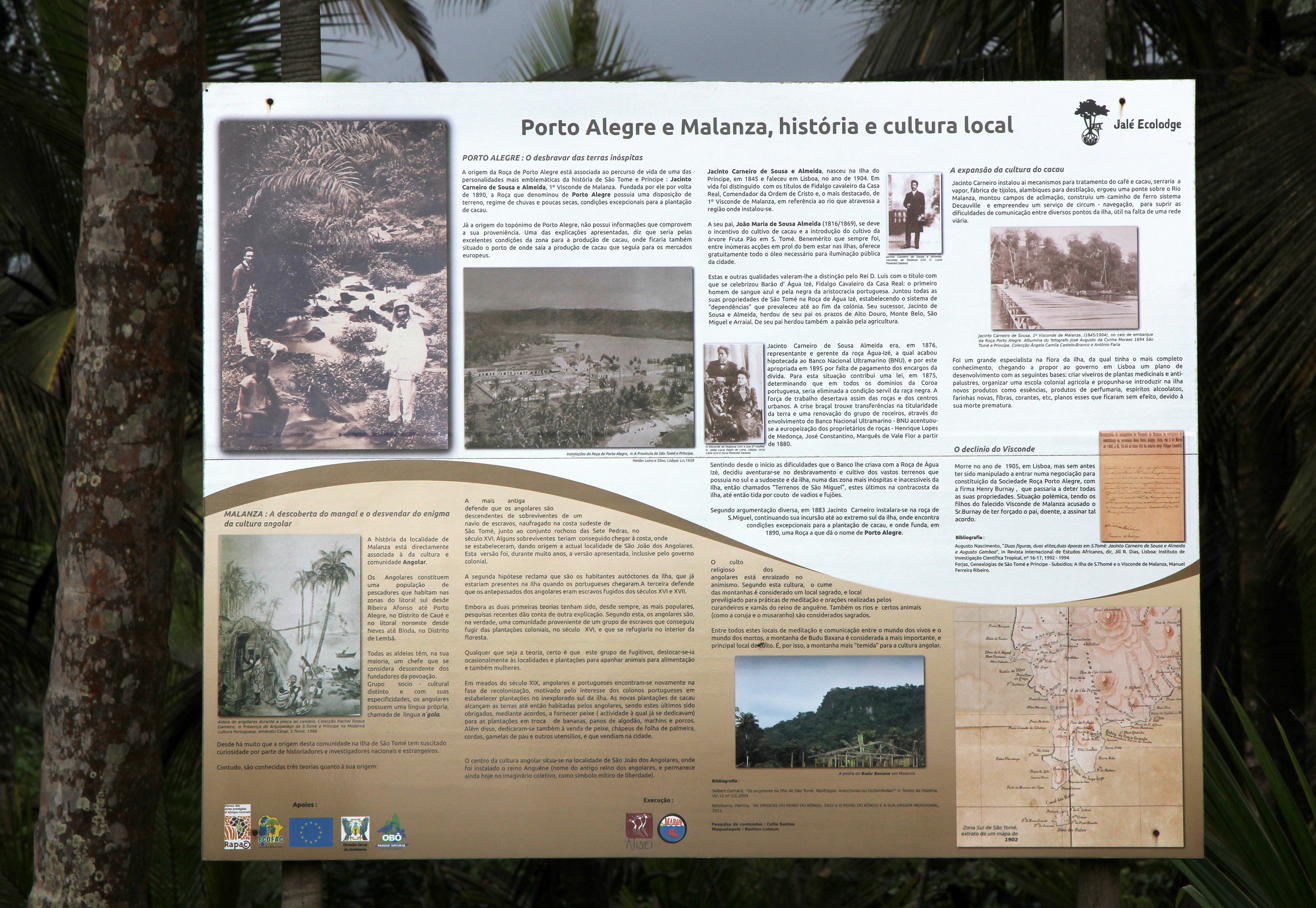
Information wall on the history of Roça Porto Alegre

== Climate ==
Porto Alegre has a tropical monsoon climate (Am) with heavy to very heavy rainfall in all months except June, July and August.

Climate data for Porto Alegre
Month	Jan	Feb	Mar	Apr	May	Jun	Jul	Aug	Sep	Oct	Nov	Dec	Year
Mean daily maximum °C (°F)	29.1 (84.4)	29.5 (85.1)	29.8 (85.6)	29.6 (85.3)	29.0 (84.2)	27.6 (81.7)	26.9 (80.4)	27.2 (81.0)	28.4 (83.1)	28.4 (83.1)	28.7 (83.7)	28.5 (83.3)	28.6 (83.4)
Daily mean °C (°F)	25.7 (78.3)	26.1 (79.0)	26.1 (79.0)	26.2 (79.2)	25.7 (78.3)	24.4 (75.9)	23.5 (74.3)	23.8 (74.8)	24.8 (76.6)	25.0 (77.0)	25.3 (77.5)	25.3 (77.5)	25.2 (77.3)
Mean daily minimum °C (°F)	22.3 (72.1)	22.7 (72.9)	22.5 (72.5)	22.8 (73.0)	22.5 (72.5)	21.3 (70.3)	20.1 (68.2)	20.5 (68.9)	21.2 (70.2)	21.7 (71.1)	21.9 (71.4)	22.2 (72.0)	21.8 (71.3)
Average rainfall mm (inches)	292 (11.5)	249 (9.8)	347 (13.7)	390 (15.4)	344 (13.5)	77 (3.0)	12 (0.5)	64 (2.5)	209 (8.2)	493 (19.4)	431 (17.0)	330 (13.0)	3,238 (127.5)
Source: Climate-Data.org
