= Tinhosa Grande =

Islet in São Tomé and Príncipe

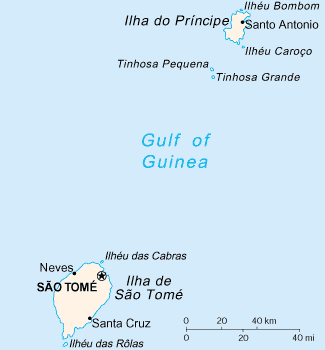
- Map of São Tomé and Príncipe with Tinhosa Grande on the top
- Interactive map of Tinhosa Grande

Geography
- Location: São Tomé and Príncipe, SW of Príncipe
- Coordinates: 1.3421°N 7.2917°E
- Archipelago: Pedras Tinhosas
- Area: 0.2 km^{2} (0.077 sq mi)
- Highest elevation: 55 m (180 ft)

Administration
- São Tomé and Príncipe

Demographics
- Population: 0

Tinhosa Grande is an uninhabited islet in São Tomé and Príncipe, located 23 km (14 mi) southwest of the island of Príncipe and 124 km (77 mi) northeast of the island of São Tomé in the Atlantic Ocean. Together with the smaller islet Tinhosa Pequena, 4 kilometers to its north, it forms the Pedras Tinhosas group. The islet covers an area of 20 hectares (49 acres), and has a maximum elevation of 55 metres.

It is a designated Ramsar site. Since 2012, it has formed part of the UNESCO's Island of Príncipe Biosphere Reserve. A species of skink found on the islet, Trachylepis adamastor, was first described in 2015.
