= Sete Pedras =

Islets in São Tomé and Príncipe

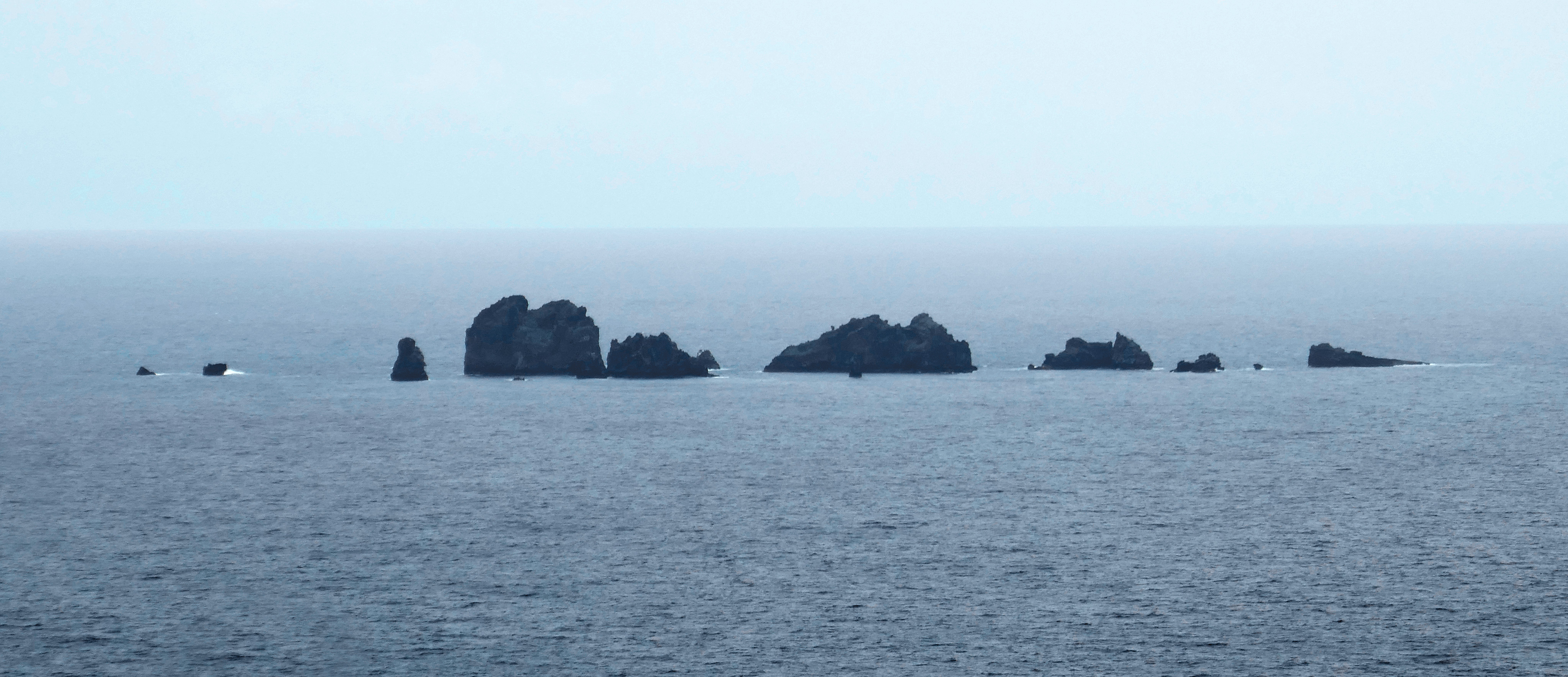

- Location within São Tomé Island

Geography
- Location: Southeast of the island of São Tomé, São Tomé and Príncipe
- Coordinates: 0.0388°N 6.62261°E
- Highest elevation: 42 m (138 ft)

Administration
- São Tomé and Príncipe

Demographics
- Population: 0

Sete Pedras (Portuguese for "seven stones") is a group of rocky islets in the Gulf of Guinea, and one of the smallest islands of São Tomé and Príncipe. The islets lie about 2.5 nmi (4.6 km) off the southeast coast of the island of São Tomé. The largest islet is 42 metres high. The islets were mentioned as "Seven Steen" (17th century Dutch for "seven stones") in the 1665 map by Johannes Vingboons.
