= Ilhéu Bom Bom =

Islet in São Tomé and Príncipe

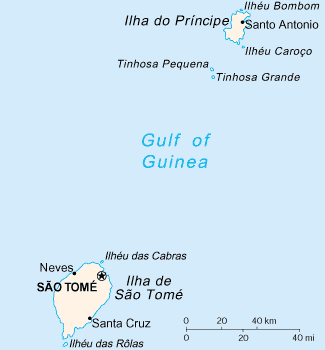
- Map of São Tomé and Príncipe with Ilhéu Bombom at the top
- Interactive map of Ilhéu Bom Bom

Geography
- Location: São Tomé and Príncipe
- Coordinates: 1.698855°N 7.402632°E

Administration
- São Tomé and Príncipe

Demographics
- Population: 15 (2008)

Ilhéu Bom Bom, also written as Ilhéu Bombom, is an island in the Gulf of Guinea. The islet is located near the north coast of the island of Príncipe, one of the main islands of São Tomé and Príncipe, and is almost completely forested. Its population is 15 (2008 est.). There is a tourist resort on the island. The island is connected to the main island of Príncipe by a footbridge. There is a lighthouse on the island built in 1997. Its focal height is 64 meters (210 ft) and its range is 12 nmi (22 km; 14 mi).

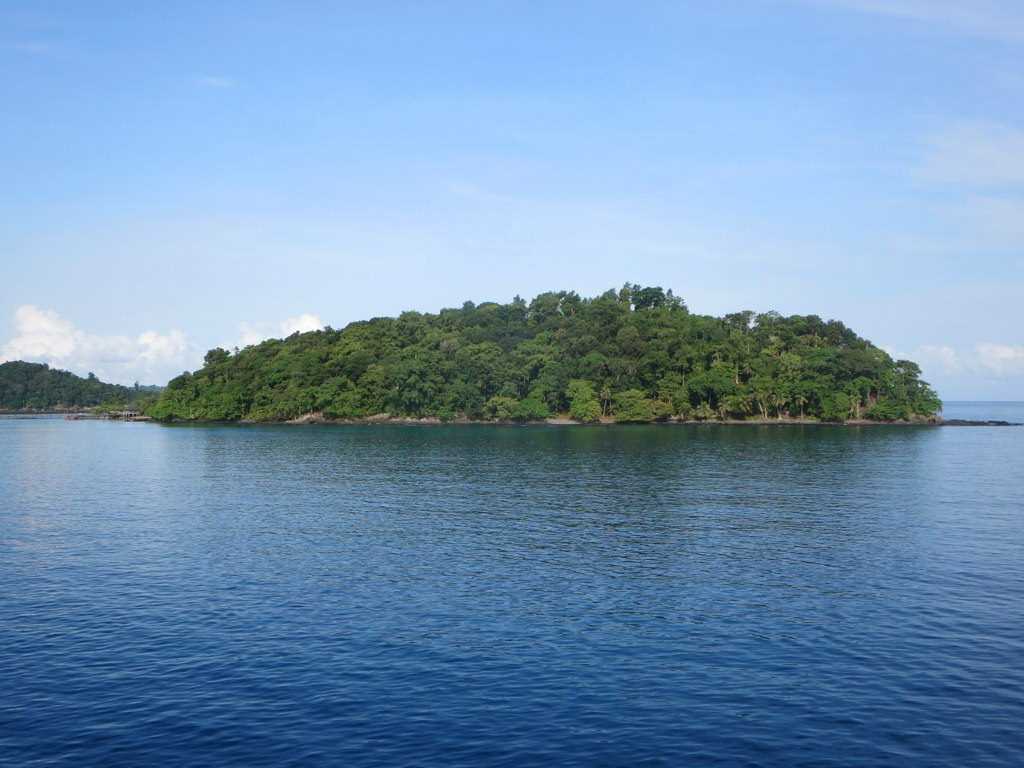
Ilhéu Bom Bom

Since 2012, it forms a part of the UNESCO's Island of Príncipe Biosphere Reserve.
