= São João dos Angolares =

- Town
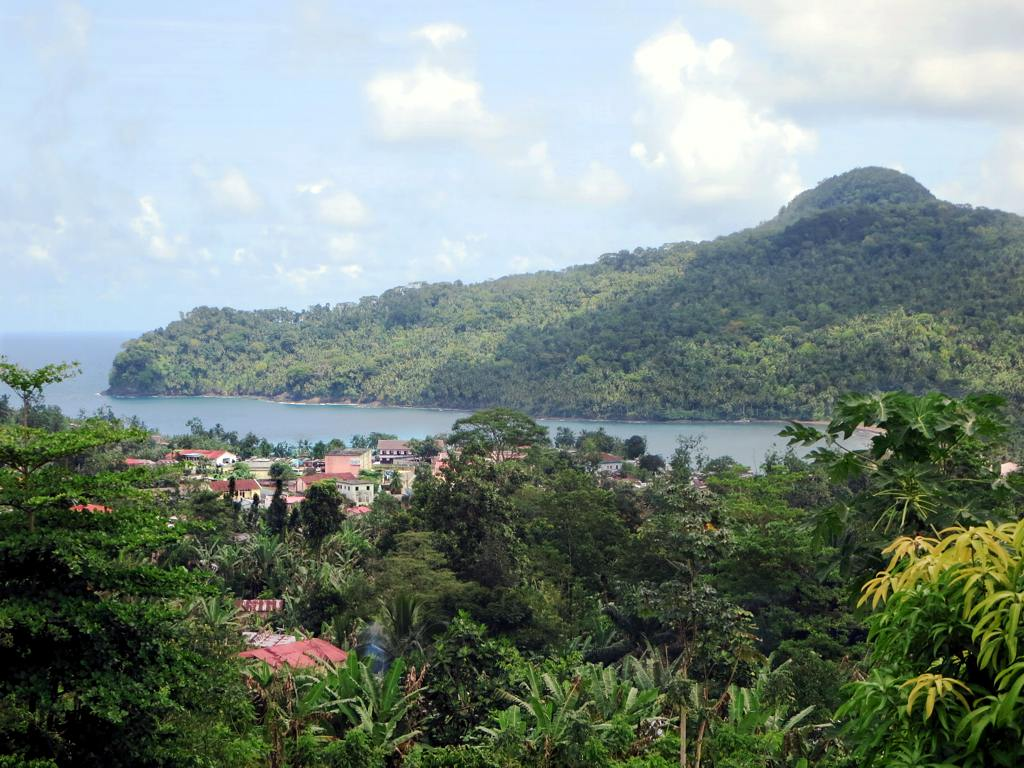

- Location on São Tomé Island
- Coordinates: 0°8′N 6°39′E
- Country: São Tomé and Príncipe
- Island: São Tomé
- District: Caué

Population (2012)
  - Total: 3,605
- Time zone: UTC+1 (WAT)

São João dos Angolares is a small town on the east coast of São Tomé Island in São Tomé and Príncipe. It is the seat of Caué District. Its population is 3,605 (2012). The town lies 17 km southwest of Santana, 17 km northeast of Porto Alegre and 24 km southwest of the capital São Tomé. The Portuguese-based creole language Angolar (Ngola) is spoken in and around São João dos Angolares. The plantation complex Roça São João has been restored and is now a restaurant, hotel and arts centre. The town's football (soccer) club is UDRA (União Desportiva Rei Amador).

== Population history ==
Year	Population
2001 (census)	1,862
2012 (census)	3,605
