= Ilhéu das Rolas =

Islet in São Tomé and Príncipe

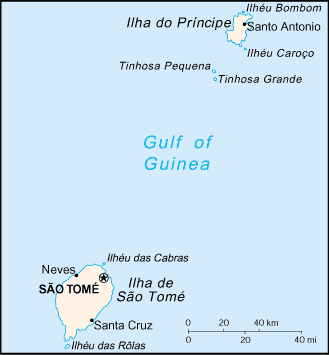
- Map of São Tomé and Príncipe
- Interactive map of Ilhéu das Rolas

Geography
- Coordinates: 0°0′14″S 6°31′21″E
- Area: 2 km^{2} (0.77 sq mi)
- Highest elevation: 96 m (315 ft)
- Highest point: Mount São Francisco

Administration
- São Tomé and Príncipe
- District: Caué

Demographics
- Population: 76 (2012)

Ilhéu das Rolas (also: Ilheu Gago Coutinho) is an islet in the African island nation of São Tomé and Príncipe. It lies on the Equator, off the southern tip of São Tomé Island, separated by Canal das Rolas. Its maximum elevation is 96 m (315 ft). Its population was 76 at the 2012 census. It is part of the Caué District. Access to the island is only by ferry from Ponta Baleia on São Tomé Island. There is a lighthouse on the islet, built in 1929, whose focal height is 106 metres (348 ft) and range is 12 nmi (22 km; 14 mi). The island is home to a small resort, the Pestana Equador.

Historical population
Year	Pop.	±%
2001	224	—
2008	255	+13.8%
2012	76	−70.2%

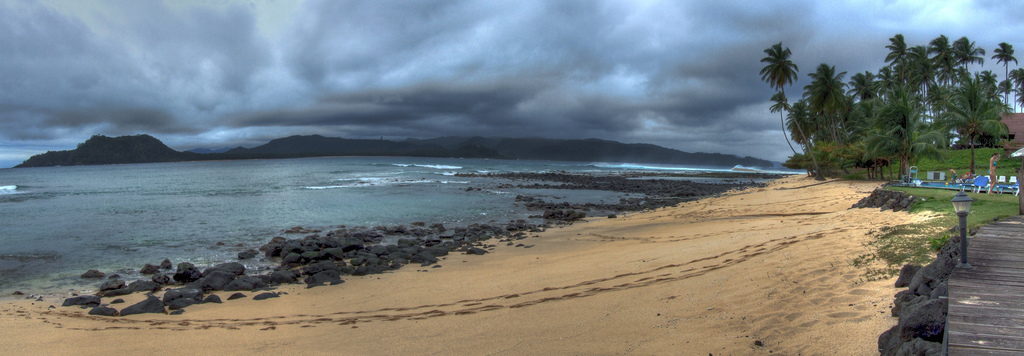
Ilhéu das Rolas with the view of nearby São Tomé

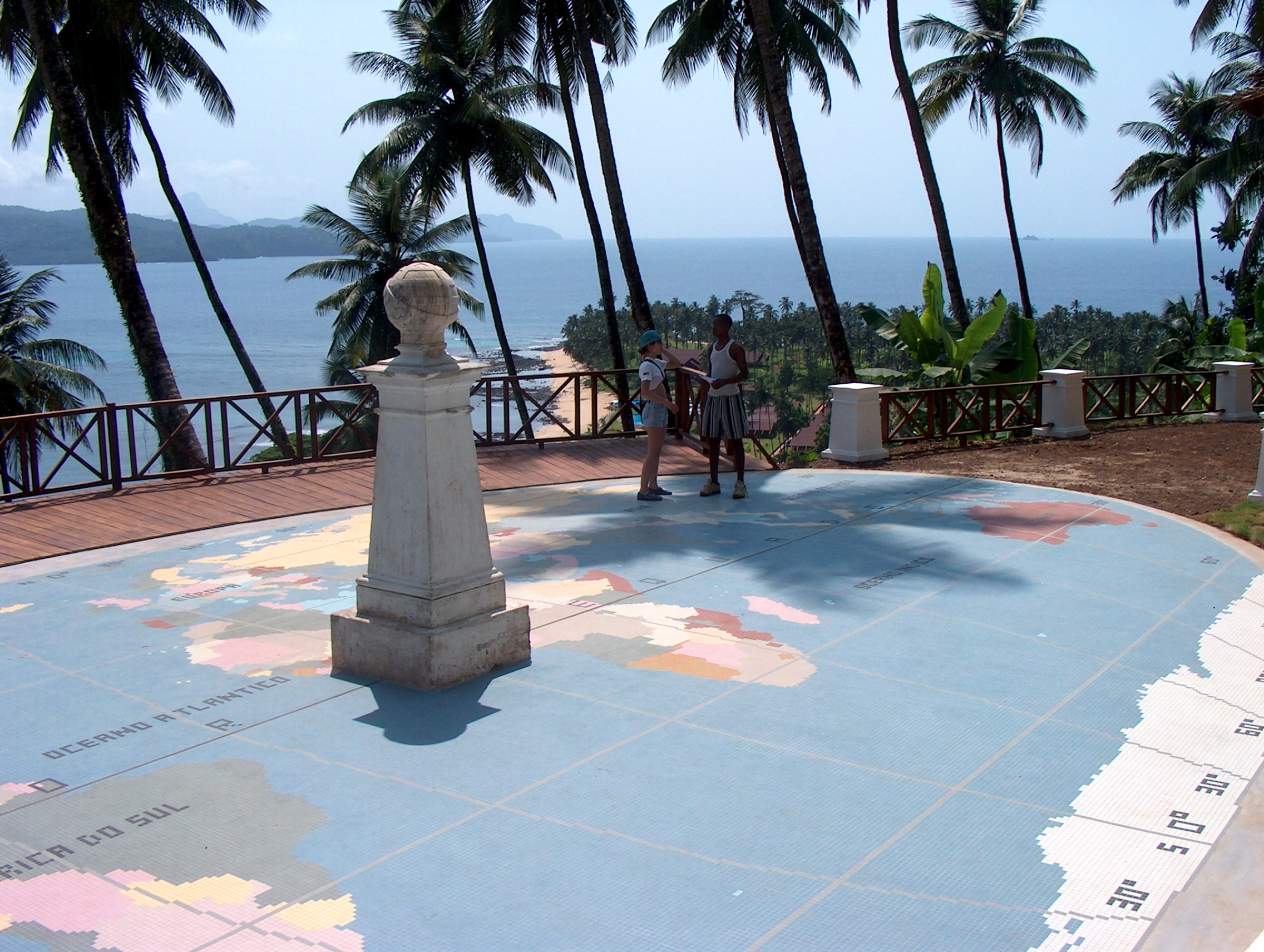
A monument that shows the equator marked as it crosses Ilhéu das Rolas. The shadow points SW, indicating that the sun is several degrees north; likely late April or early August, about 1-2 hours before noon.

== History ==
The island was mentioned as "Illie de Rolle" in a 1665 map by Johannes Vingboons. and as "I. de Rolle" in a 1780 map by A. Dalrymple.

Gago Coutinho (1869–1959), officer of the Portuguese Navy, navigator and historian, headed a geodesic mission to São Tomé between 1915 and 1918, when marks were placed as a basis for a geodetic network in the archipelago. After that, observations for triangulation, precise base measurement and astronomical observations were made.

In the process, Gago Coutinho proved that Ilhéu das Rolas is crossed by the equatorial line. The resulting map was published in 1919, together with the Report of the Geodetic Mission on São Tomé Island 1915–1918, that was officially considered the first complete work of practical geodesy in the Portuguese colonies.

== Nature ==
The islet is abundant in flora and fauna. Some endemic species are Greeff's giant gecko, birds such as the São Tomé prinia and the São Tomé weaver and frogs such as Phrynobatrachus leveleve and Schistometopum thomense.

== Gallery ==
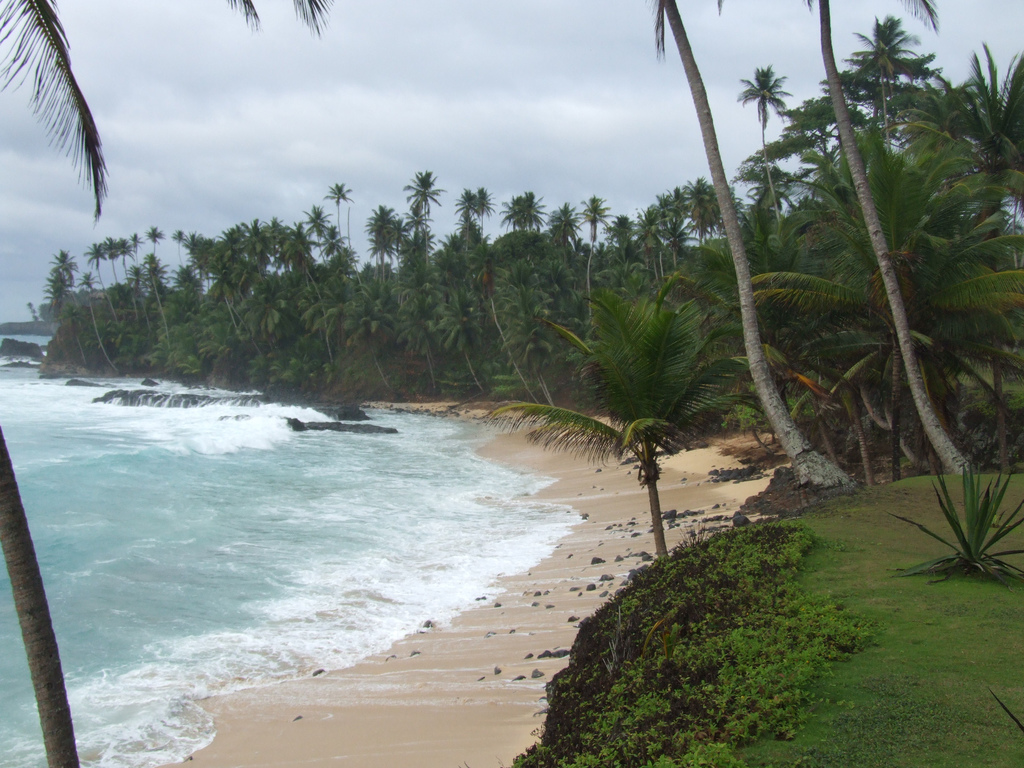
Praia de Santo António

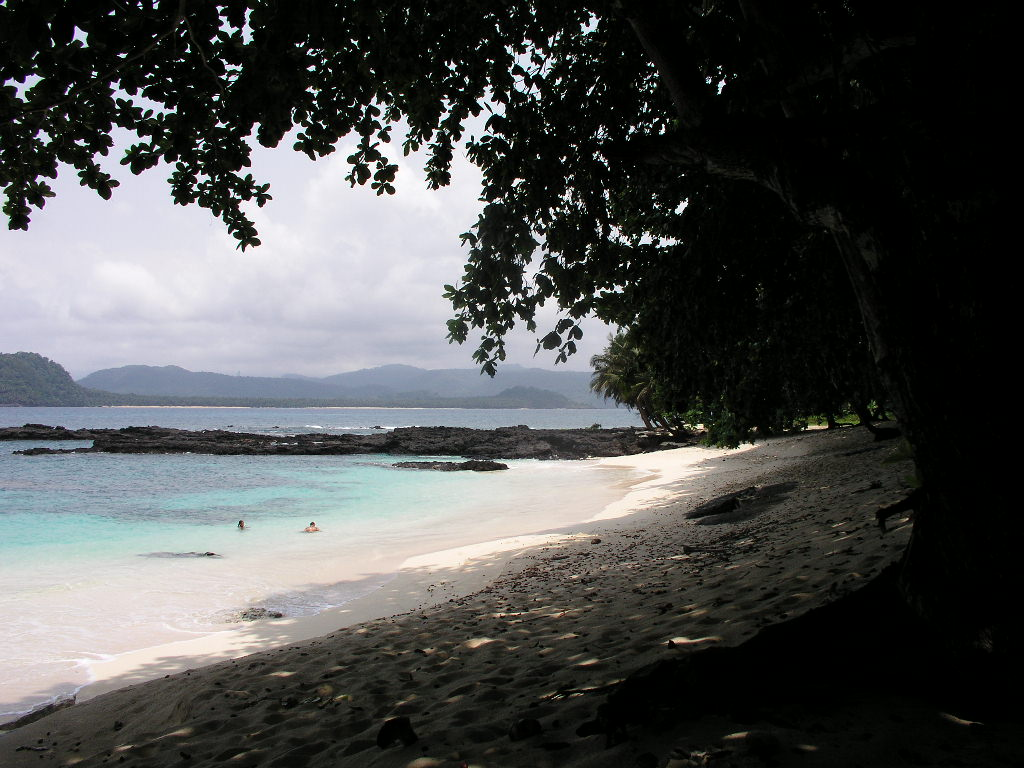
Beach scenery in São Tomé and Príncipe

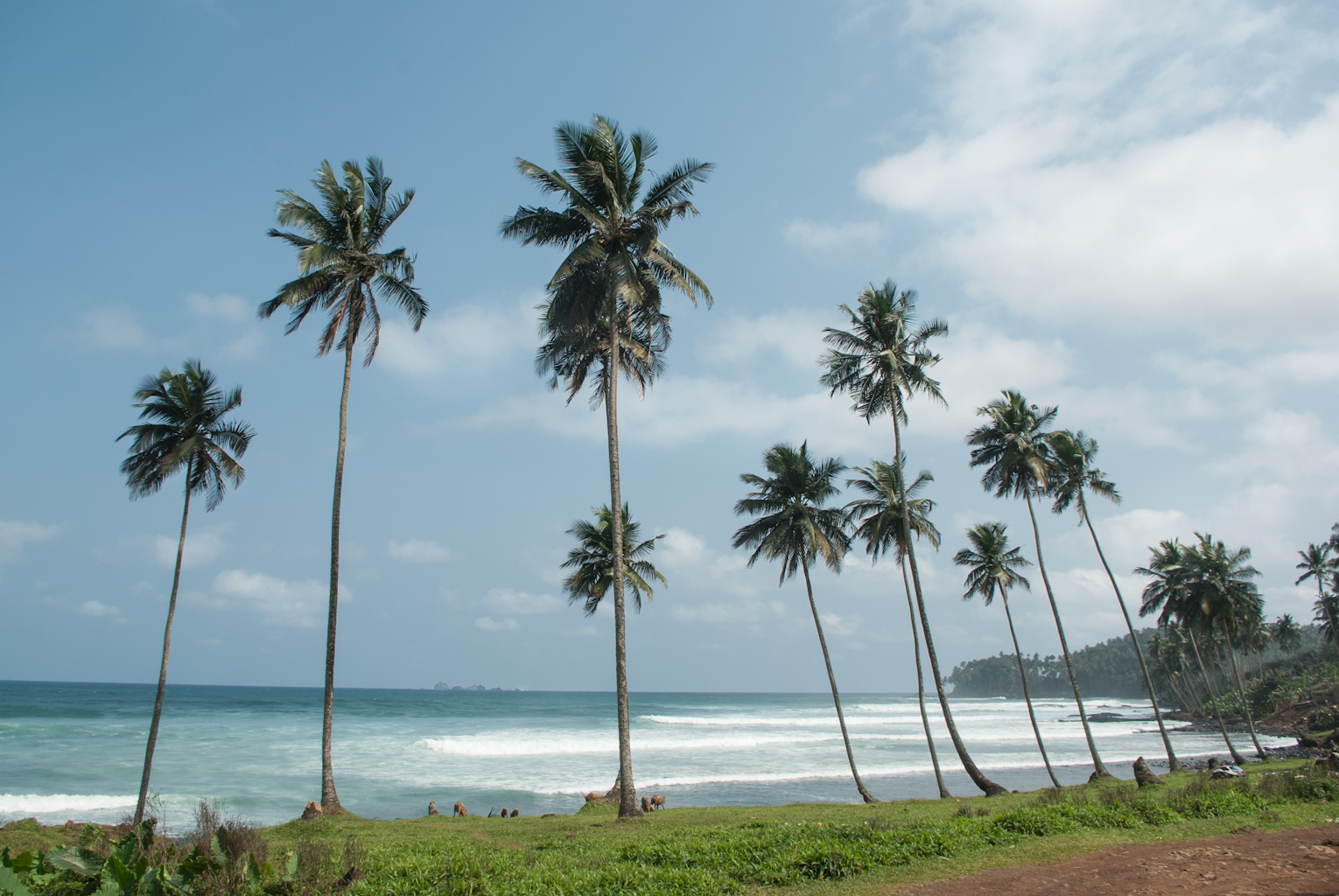
Ilhéu das Rolas

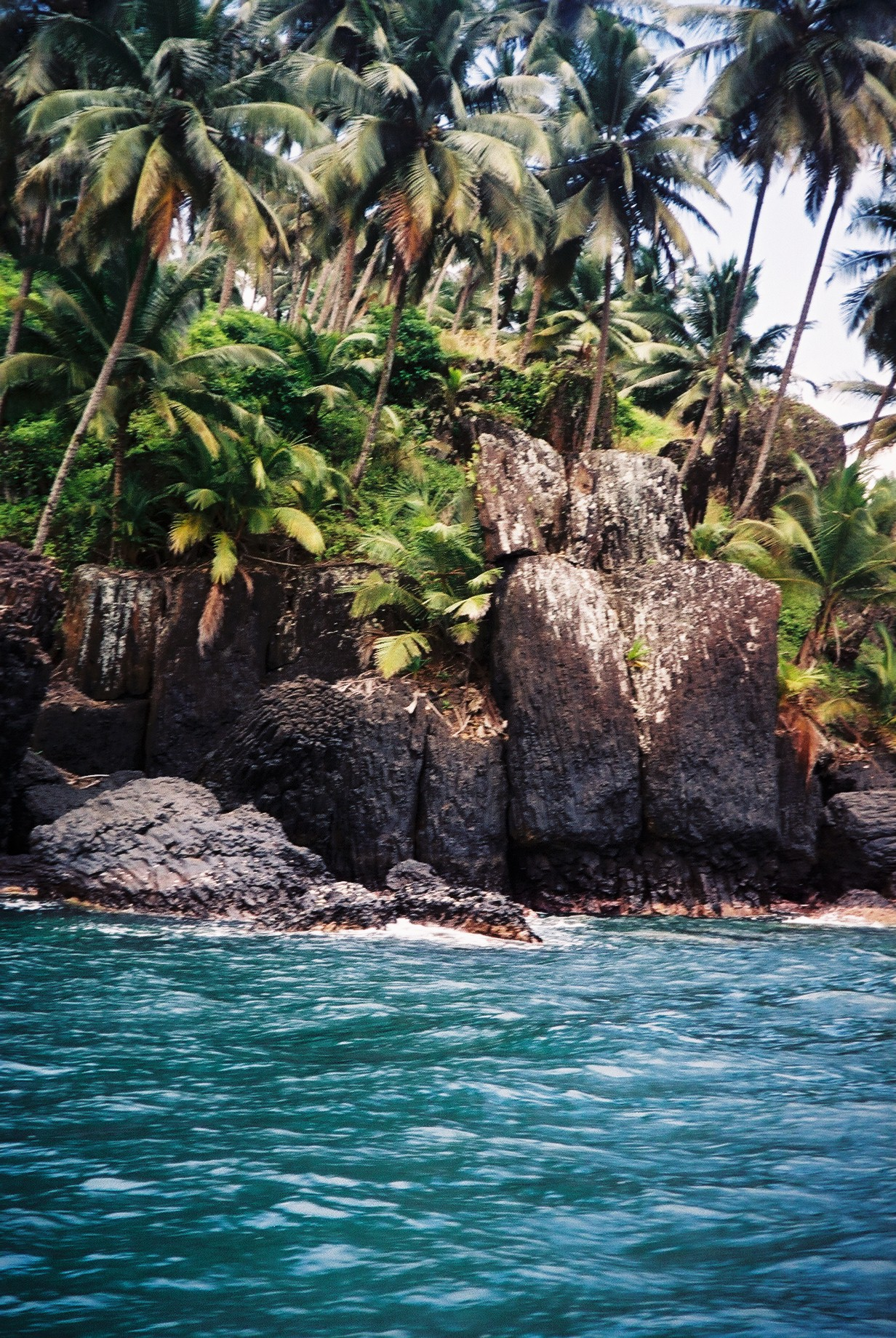
Ilhéu das Rolas

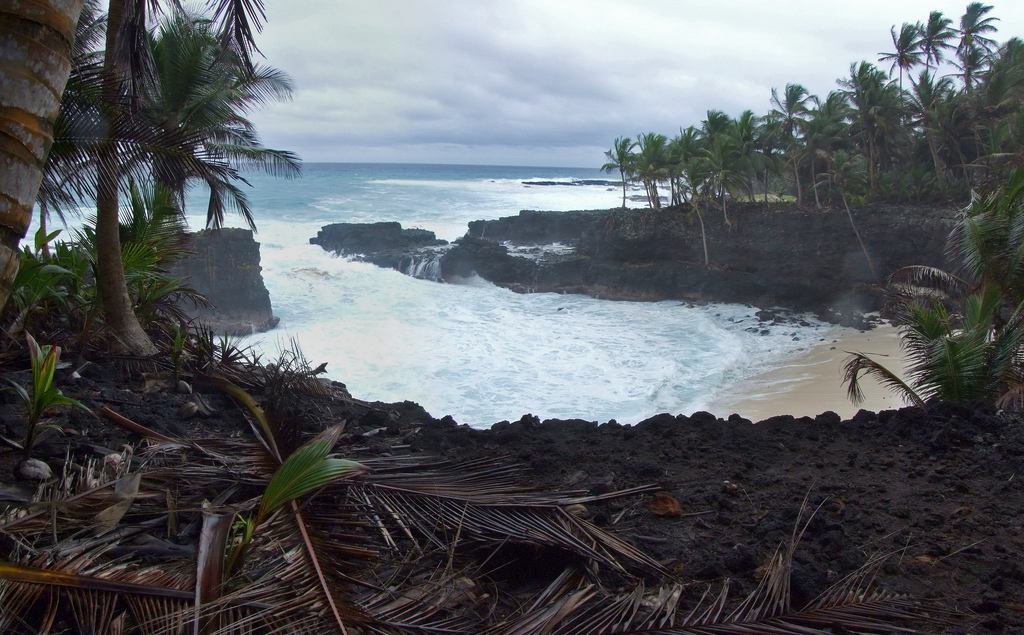
São Tomé and Príncipe

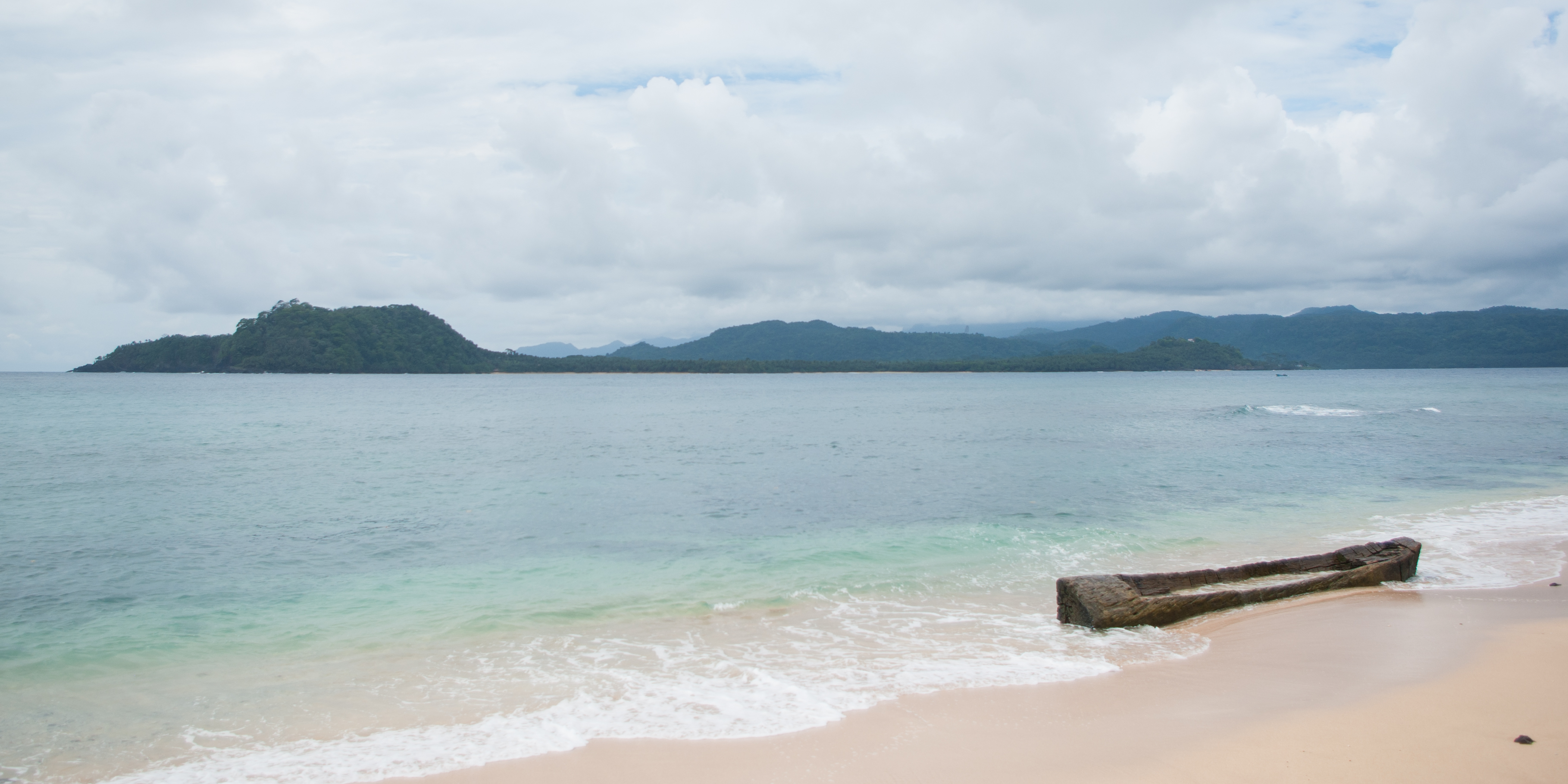
São Tomé and Príncipe

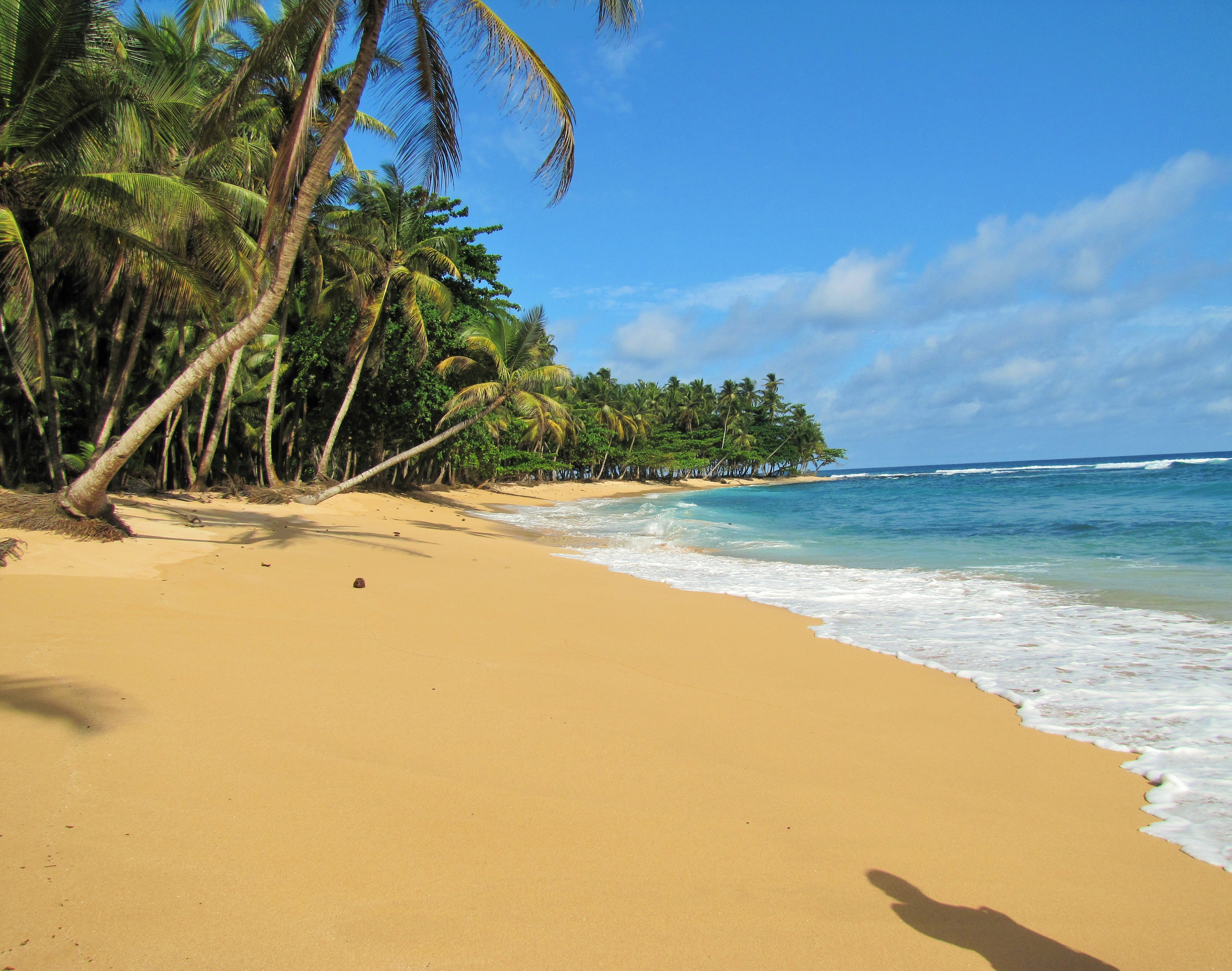
Beach close to Ilhéu das Rolas, São Tomé and Príncipe

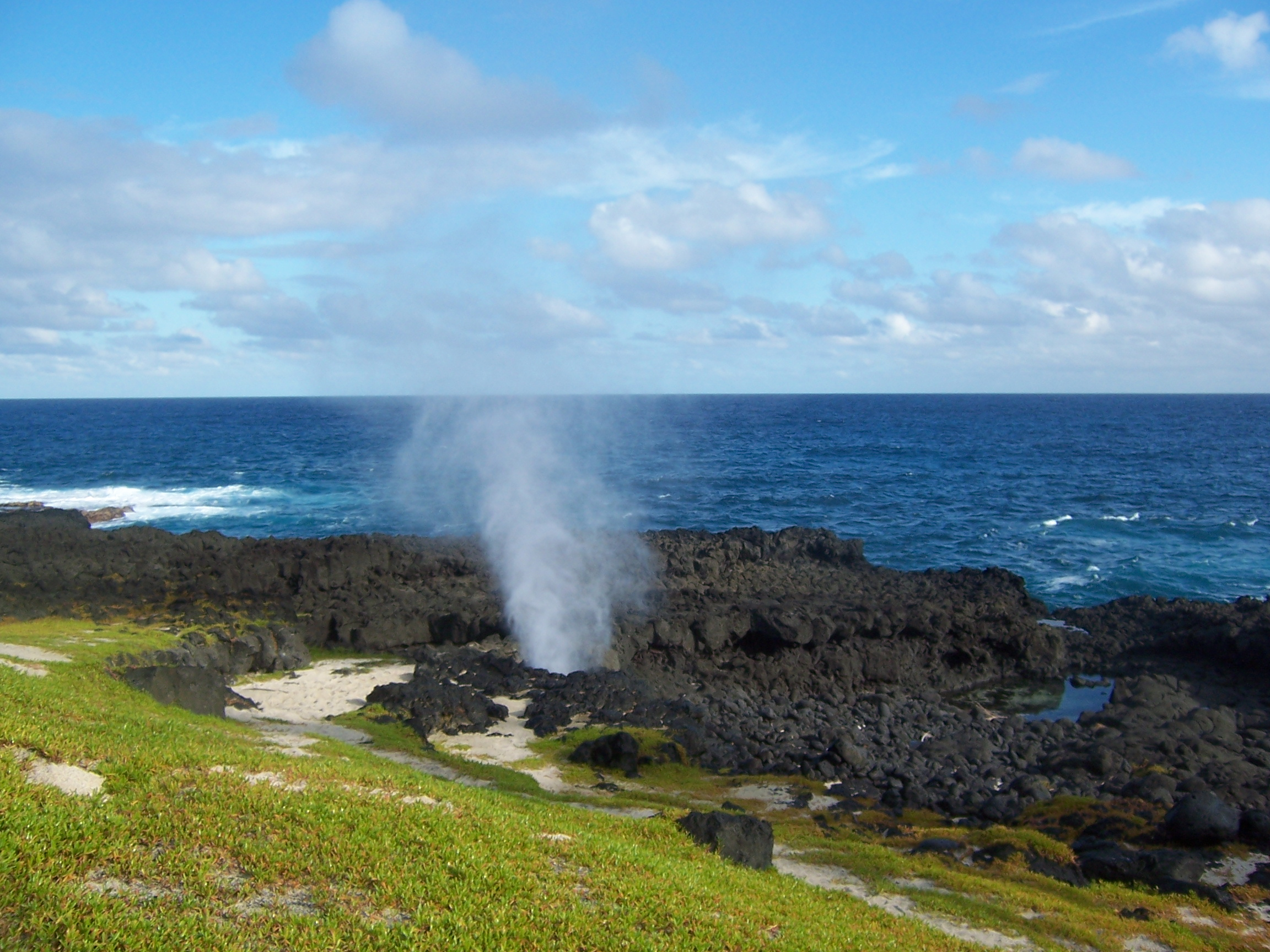
Furnas, a blowhole in Rolas
