= São Tomé, Príncipe, and Annobón forests =

Terrestrial ecoregion in Africa

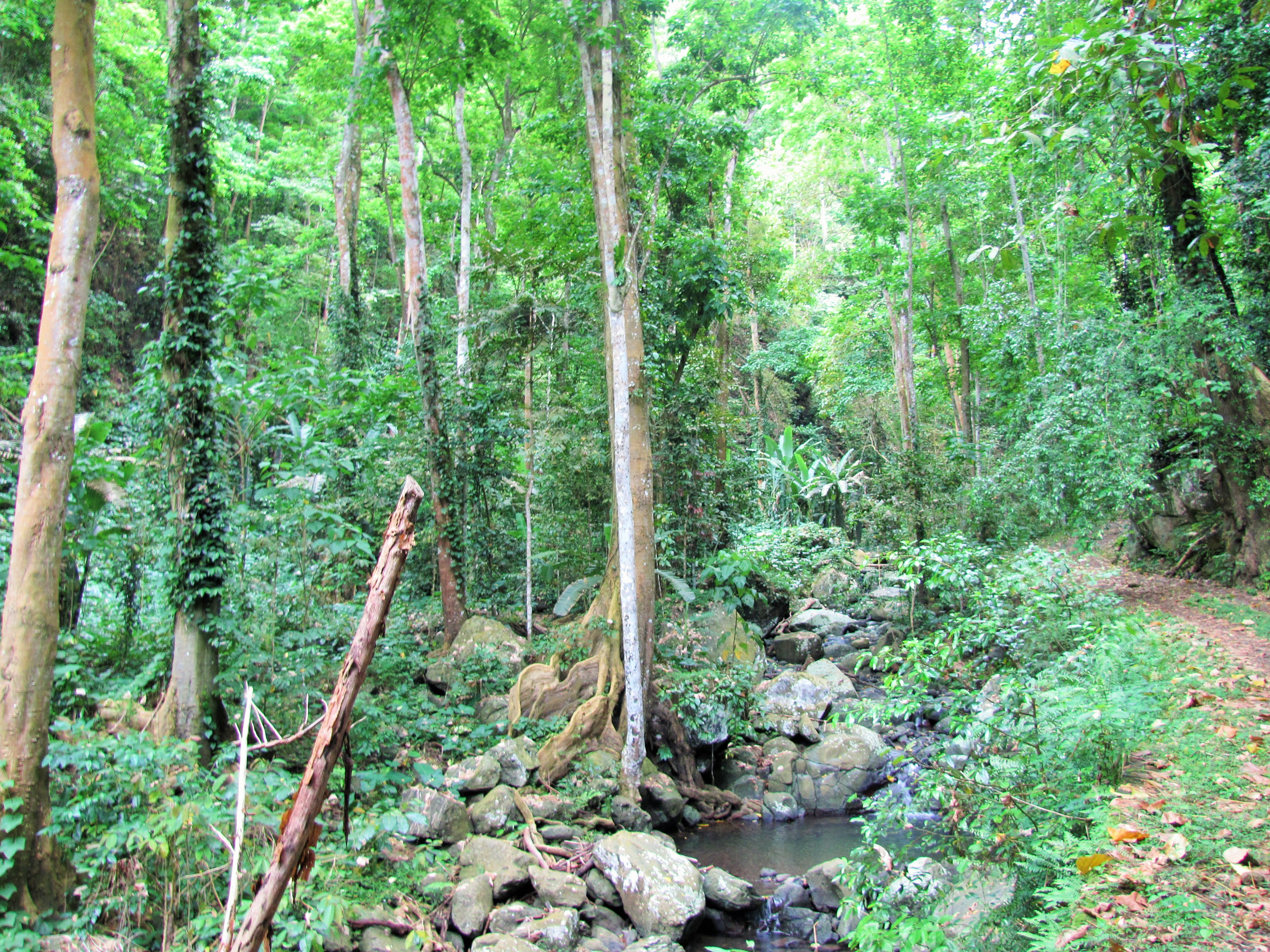
- forest on São Tomé

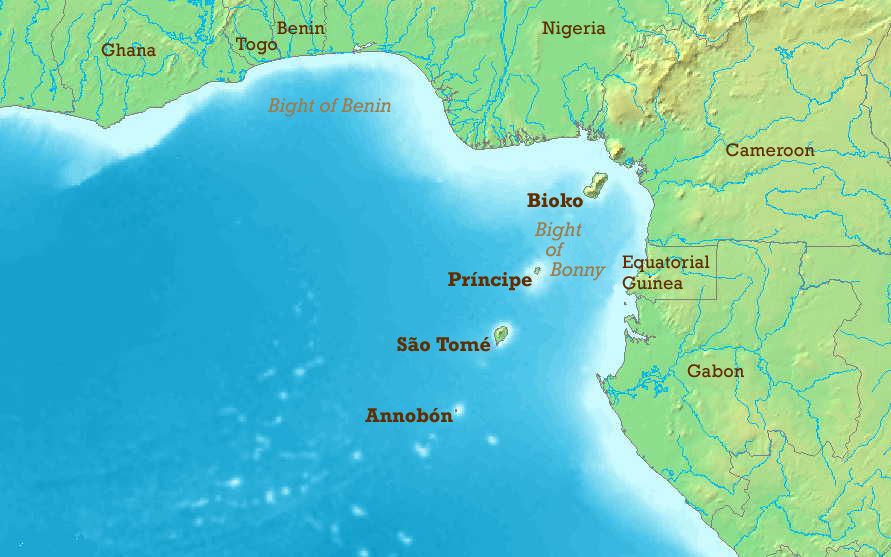
- Map of the Gulf of Guinea, showing São Tomé, Príncipe, and Annobón. These islands, together with the island of Bioko and Mount Cameroon on the African mainland, are part of the Cameroon line of volcanoes.

Ecology
- Realm: Afrotropical
- Biome: tropical and subtropical moist broadleaf forests

Geography
- Area: 978 km^{2} (378 mi^{2})
- Countries: São Tomé and Príncipe; Equatorial Guinea
- Coordinates: 0.25°N 6.6°E

Conservation
- Conservation status: Vulnerable
- Global 200: yes
- Protected: 323 km² (33%)

The São Tomé, Príncipe, and Annobón forests, also known as the São Tomé, Príncipe, and Annobón moist lowland forests, is a tropical moist broadleaf forest ecoregion that covers the islands of São Tomé and Príncipe, which form the island nation of São Tomé and Príncipe, as well as the island of Annobón, which is part of Equatorial Guinea.

== Setting ==
The three islands are volcanic, part of the Cameroon Line of volcanoes that extends from Annobón in the southwest, through the islands of São Tomé, Príncipe, and Bioko, and onto the mainland as Mount Cameroon and the volcanoes of the Cameroon Highlands.

Príncipe is the northernmost island, and lies closest to the African mainland, with an area of 128 km^{2}. São Tomé is the largest of the islands, approximately 836 km^{2}, and lies southwest of Príncipe. Annobón is the southernmost island and lies furthest from the African coast, with an area of 17 km^{2}. The islands are mountainous, with the highest peaks reaching to 2,024 meters on São Tomé (Pico de São Tomé), 948 meters on Príncipe (Pico do Príncipe), and 598 meters on Annobón (Pico Quioveo).

Príncipe is the oldest of the islands, with the oldest rocks dating back 31 million years. São Tomé is 14 million years old, and Annobón 4.8 million years old. None of the islands have been connected to mainland Africa.

The Tinhosas islands are two unvegetated rocky islets lying 22 km south of Príncipe. Tinhosa Grande has an area of 22 hectares, and reaches 56 meters elevation, and Tinhosa Pequena is 3 hectares in area and 65 meters elevation. See also: Wildlife of São Tomé and Príncipe.

== Flora ==
The natural vegetation of the islands consisted of forests, which varied based on exposure and elevation, including wet lowland forests on the south and southwest portion of the islands, facing the prevailing winds, and drier lowland forests to the north and east in the islands' rain shadow. On São Tomé, lowland forests extend from sea level to 800 meters elevation, montane forests from 800 to 1400 meters elevation, and cloud forests above 1400 meters elevation. The upper montane forests and cloud forests include plants characteristic of afromontane flora, including Olea capensis, Syzygium guineense, and Pauridiantha floribunda, and the endemic trees Afrocarpus mannii, Tabernaemontana stenosiphon, Homalium henriquesii, Croton stelluliferus, Polyscias quintasii, and Craterispermum montanum.

There are 37 endemic plant species on Príncipe, 95 on São Tomé (along with one endemic genus), and 20 on Annobón. Only 16 of the islands' endemic plants are shared by more than one island.

== Fauna ==
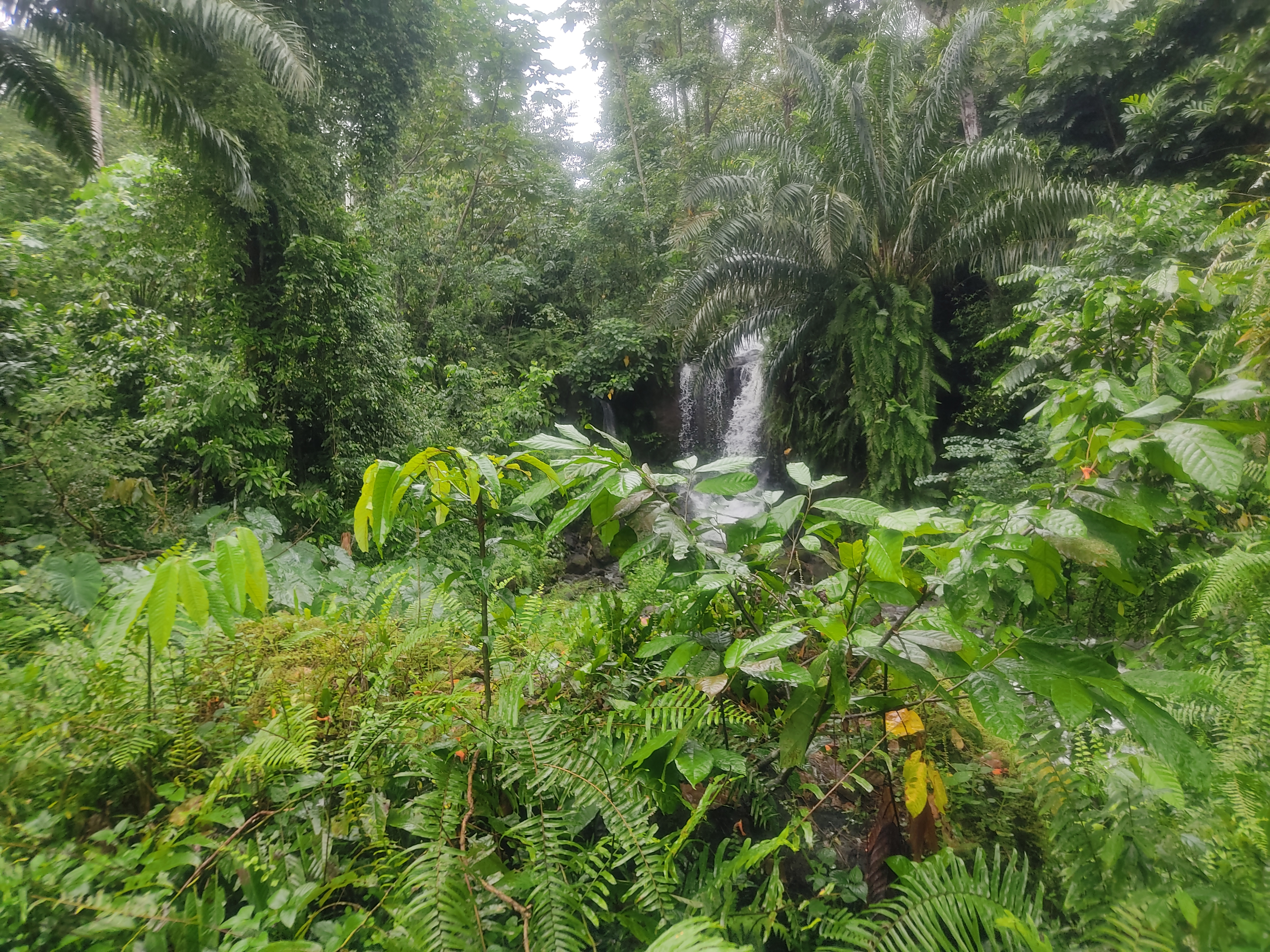
Forest of São Tomé Island

=== Birds ===
The islands are home to 143 species of birds, including 72 breeding resident species.

Twenty-eight bird species, all forest dwellers, are endemic to ecoregion. Seven species are endemic to Príncipe. The endemic subspecies of olive ibis on Príncipe, B. o. rothschildi, is probably the rarest bird in the archipelago. Sixteen species are endemic to São Tomé, with two endemic genera. These include the São Tomé ibis (Bostrychia bocagei), São Tomé olive pigeon (Columba thomensis), São Tomé scops-owl (Otus hartlaubi), São Tomé fiscal (Lanius newtoni), São Tomé shorttail (Amaurocichla bocagii), giant sunbird (Nectarinia thomensis), São Tomé grosbeak (Neospiza concolor) and São Tomé oriole (Oriolus crassirostris). Annobón is home to the endemic Annobón white-eye (Zosterops griseovirescens) and Annobón paradise-flycatcher, (Terpsiphone smithii). An additional four endemic species inhabit two or more of the islands, including the Príncipe speirops (Speirops leucophoeus) and velvet-mantled drongo (Dicrurus modestus), which inhabit both São Tomé and Príncipe, and the São Tomé bronze-naped pigeon (Columba malherbii) which inhabits both São Tomé and Annobón.

The Tinhosas islands are home to the largest seabird colonies in the Gulf of Guinea, with breeding colonies of sooty terns (Onychoprion fuscatus, 100,000 breeding pairs), black noddies (Anous minutus, 10,000–20,000 breeding pairs), brown noddies (Anous stolidus, 4,000–8,000 breeding pairs), brown boobies (Sula leucogaster, 1,500–3,000 breeding pairs) and small numbers of white-tailed tropicbirds (Phaethon lepturus).

=== Mammals ===
The ecoregion is home to three endemic mammal species: the São Tomé shrew (Crocidura thomensis), São Tomé collared fruit bat (Myonycteris brachycephala) and São Tomé free-tailed bat (Chaerephon tomensis).

== Protected areas ==
A 2017 assessment found that 323 km^{2}, or 33%, of the ecoregion is in protected areas. Protected areas in the ecoregion include Obo Natural Park, which includes the Tinhosas islands and portions of São Tomé and Príncipe islands, and the Annobón Natural Reserve on Annobón.
