= Wildlife of São Tomé and Príncipe =

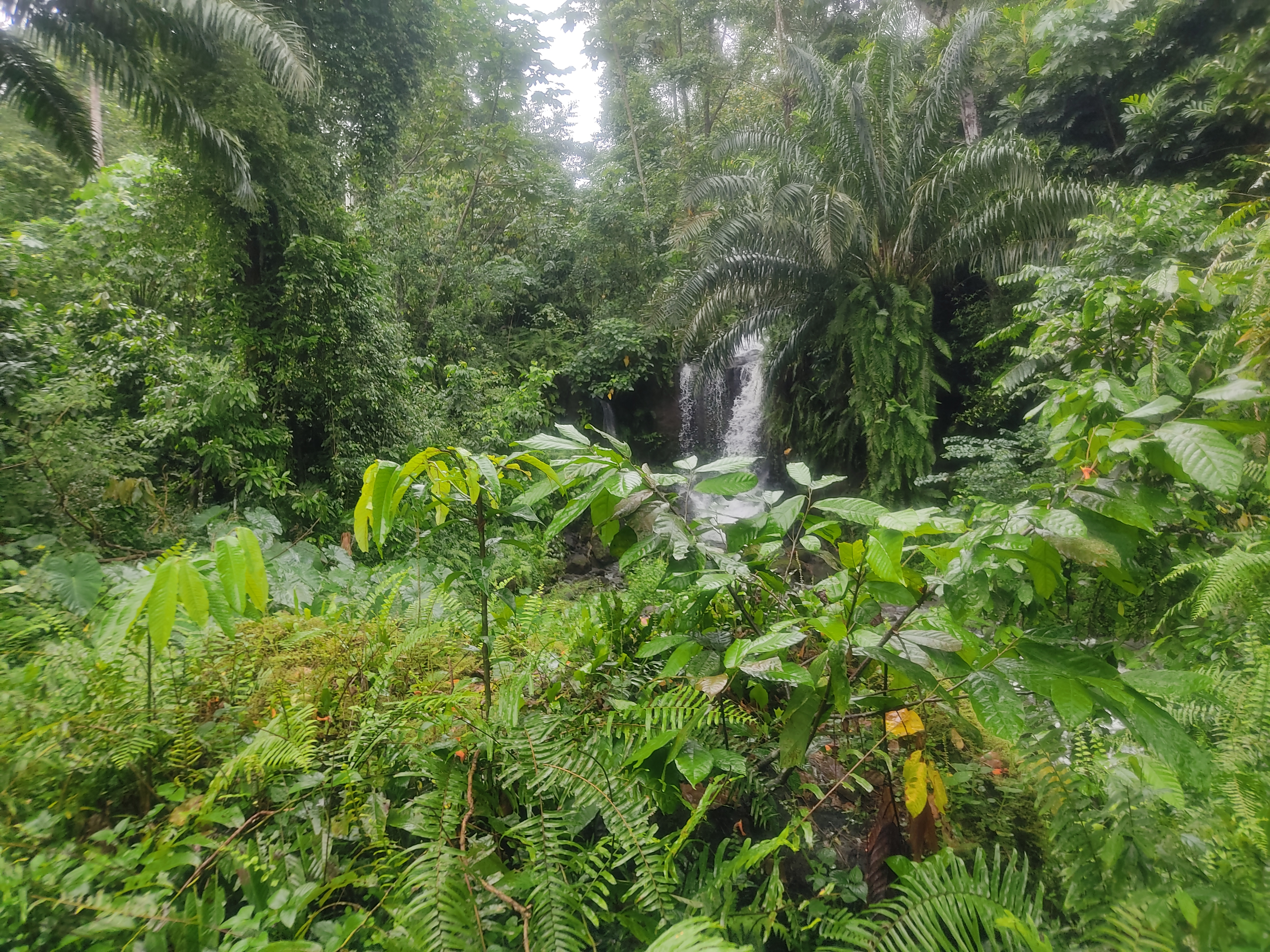
Forest of São Tomé Island

The wildlife of São Tomé and Príncipe is composed of its flora and fauna. São Tomé and Príncipe are oceanic islands which have always been separate from mainland West Africa and so there is a relatively low diversity of species, restricted to those that have managed to cross the sea to the islands. However the level of endemism is high with many species occurring nowhere else in the world.

== Setting ==
The four islands are volcanic, part of the Cameroon Line of volcanoes that extends from Annobón in the southwest, through the islands of São Tomé, Príncipe, and Bioko, and onto the mainland as Mount Cameroon and the volcanoes of the Cameroon Highlands. The rainfall precipitation is due in part to condensation of the ocean mist.

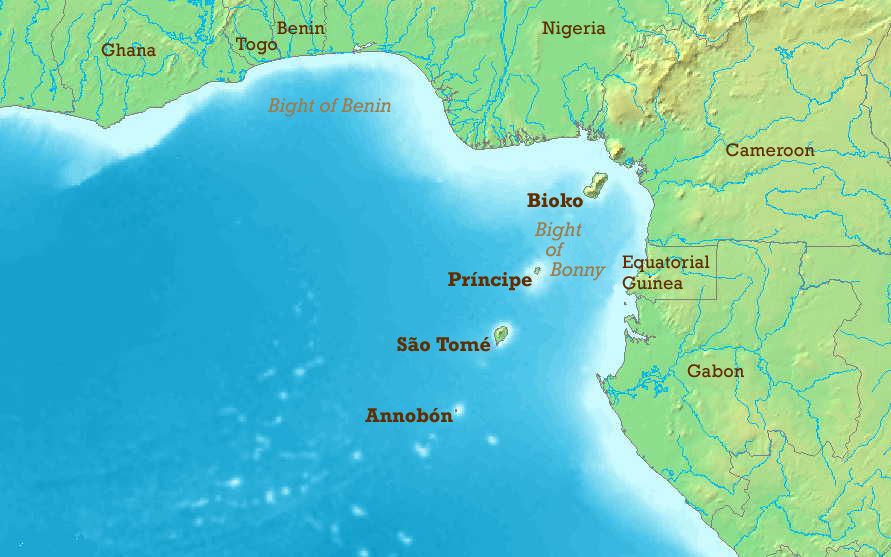
Map of the Gulf of Guinea, showing São Tomé, Príncipe, and Annobón. These islands, together with the island of Bioko and Mount Cameroon on the African mainland, are part of the Cameroon line of volcanoes.

São Tomé and Príncipe consists of two volcanic islands in the Gulf of Guinea. Rain forests cover almost three quarters of the total area and can be divided into three zones, named low altitude rainforest, submontane rain forest and Afromontane evergreen cloud forest. Much of the moist lowland forest has been cleared and currently comprises mainly savannah vegetation in the north and palm plantations and coconut tree plantations in the south. Still, the tropical montane cloud forest remains largely unchanged. The cloud forest is home to low tree of open canopy. São Tomé and Príncipe currently do not have any officially protected area. Most primary forests are still survived thanks to the inaccessibility of the steep slopes in the humid and inhospitable island, which are not suitable for farming activities or for humans to inhabit them.

Príncipe is the northernmost island, and lies closest to the African mainland, with an area of 128 km^{2}. São Tomé is the larger of the two islands, approximately 836 km^{2}, and lies southwest of Príncipe. Annobón is the southernmost island and lies furthest from the African coast, with an area of 17 km^{2}. The islands are mountainous, with the highest peaks reaching to 2,024 meters on São Tomé (Pico de São Tomé), 948 meters on Príncipe (Pico do Príncipe), and 598 meters on Annobón (Pico Quioveo).

Príncipe is the oldest of the islands, with the oldest rocks dating back 31 million years. São Tomé is 14 million years old, and Annobón 4.8 million years old. None of the islands have been connected to mainland Africa.

The Tinhosas islands are two unvegetated rocky islets lying 22 km south of Príncipe. Tinhosa Grande has an area of 22 hectares, and reaches 56 m (184 ft) elevation, and Tinhosa Pequena is 3 hectares (7.4 acres) in area and 65 m (213 ft) elevation.

Bioko and Annobón are extinct volcanos included in the same ecoregion as São Tomé e Príncipe. Annobon rises 598 m (1961 ft) above sea level. Both islands are part of Equatorial Guinea.

== Fauna ==
=== Mammals ===
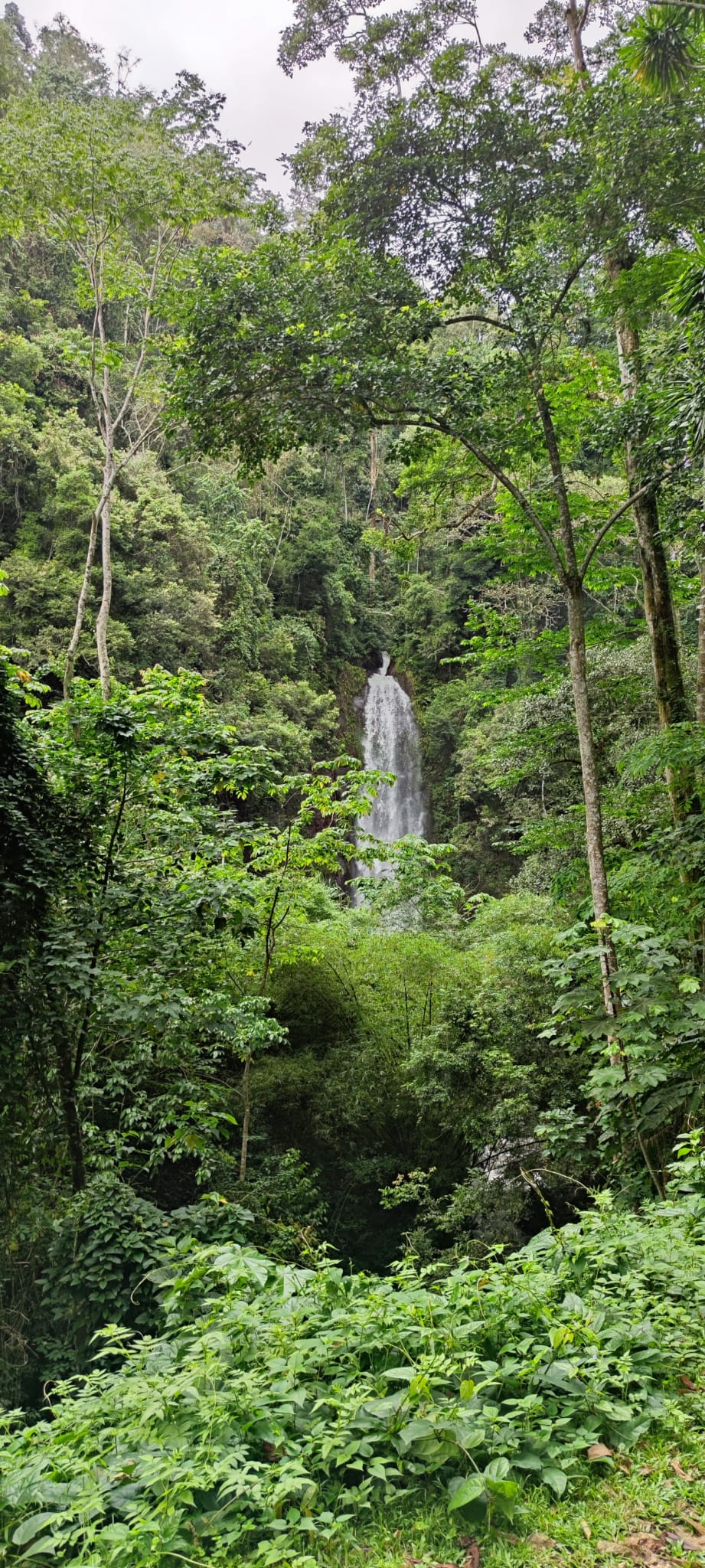
Waterfall in São Tomé Island

The diversity of mammals is low and there is only one endemic terrestrial mammal, the São Tomé shrew. There are several bats, including the recently described São Tomé free-tailed bat. Various cetaceans such as the humpback whale occur offshore and whaling formerly took place. A number of species have been introduced by man such as the mona monkey, rats and feral pigs.

=== Birds ===
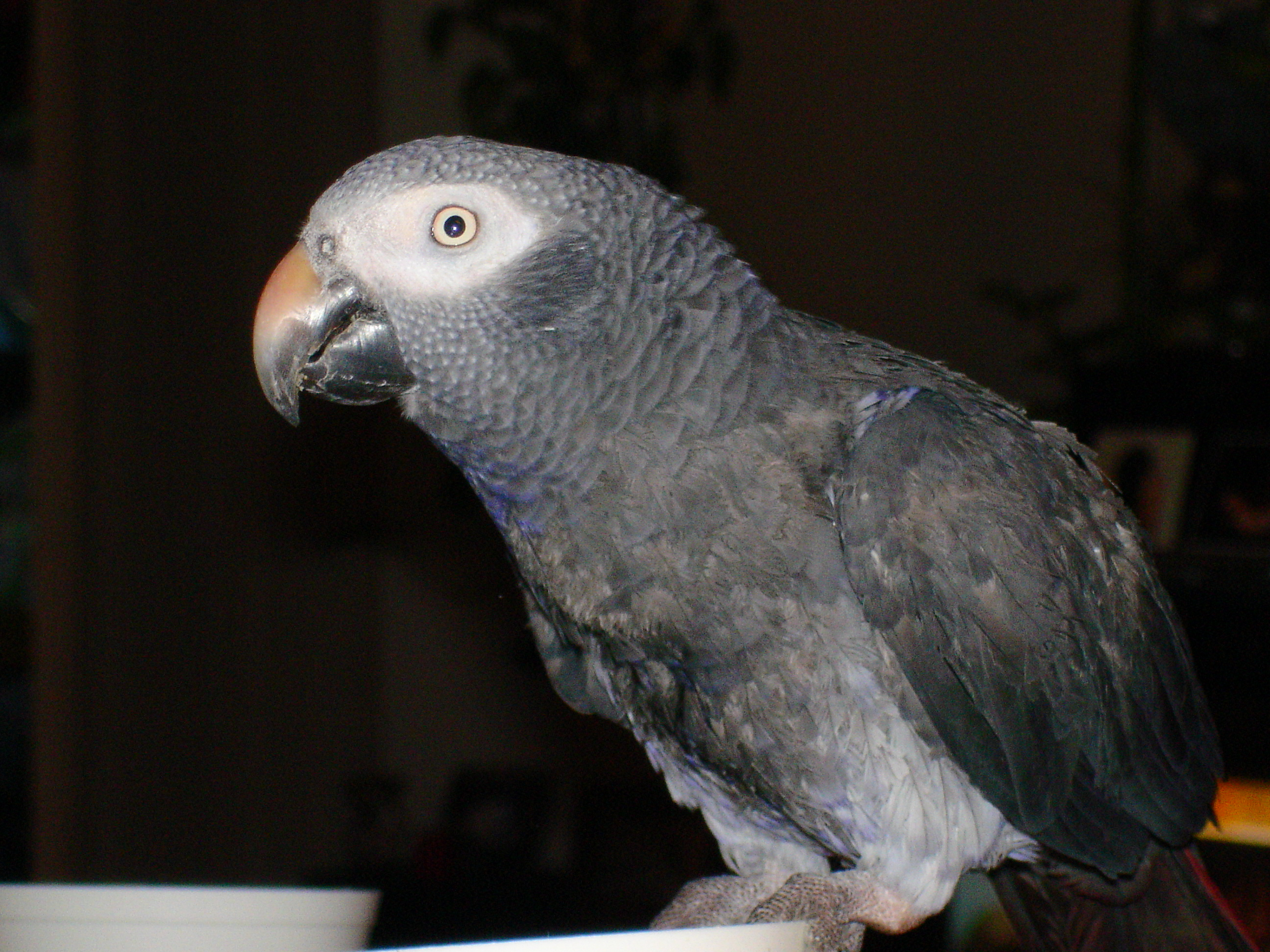
African grey parrot, threatened by trapping for the pet trade.

At least 114 bird species have occurred on the islands and there are about 26 endemics, depending on taxonomy. At least three have no close relatives and are classified in genera of their own, the São Tomé short-tail, São Tomé grosbeak and Dohrn's thrush-babbler. The islands' birds include the world's largest sunbird (the giant sunbird) and the smallest ibis (dwarf olive ibis). Large seabird colonies are found on some of the smaller islets. Several of the country's birds are considered to be threatened with extinction and three, the dwarf olive ibis, São Tomé fiscal and São Tomé grosbeak, are critically endangered.

=== Amphibians ===
There are seven amphibian species native to São Tomé and Príncipe, all of them endemic: six frogs (Leptopelis palmatus, Hyperolius molleri, H. thomensis, Phrynobatrachus dispar, P. leveleve, and Ptychadena newtoni) and one caecilian, the cobra bobo Schistometopum thomense. Exactly how these species (or their ancestors) have managed to colonize the islands is not obvious as amphibians generally have low tolerance to sea water. Dispersal by birds or storms seems unlikely, especially for the subterranean caecilian. Instead, it has been suggested that the most plausible explanation is rafting, with floating conglomerations of tree trunks, freshwater aquatic plants, and even soil, during periods when sea surface salinity was lower. A possible source of suitable rafts and freshwater plumes is the Congo River.

== Flora ==
There are about 895 species of vascular plant native to the islands, of which 95 are restricted to São Tomé and 37 occur only on Príncipe. The families Orchidaceae, Rubiaceae and Euphorbiaceae are well represented, as are the genera Calvoa and Begonia. The giant endemic begonias Begonia crateris and Begonia baccata can reach three metres in height. The islands are also rich in ferns. The only gymnosperm is a single endemic species from São Tomé, Afrocarpus mannii. Other endemic plants include:

- Leea tinctoria, from the grape family Vitaceae

There are four endemic species restricted to the cloud forest environments of the Pico de São Tomé, from 1,400 m (4,600 ft) to its peak: Afrocarpus mannii, Balthasaria mannii, Psychotria guerkeana and P. nubicola.

Rainforest covers about 74% of the country. Much of this is secondary forest that has grown on abandoned plantations, known as "capoeiras". In contrast, primary forests are called "obós". A large area of forest is protected by Obo National Park. Other habitats include savanna and small areas of beach sand dunes and mangroves.

== Bibliography ==
- Jones, P.J.; Burlison, J.P.; Tye, A. (1991). Conservação dos Ecossistemas Florestais na República Democrática de São Tomé e Príncipe (PDF) (in Portuguese). Gland, Switzerland and Cambridge, United Kingdom: IUCN. ISBN 2-88032-994-9.
- "Birding São Tomé e Príncipe". African Bird Club. 2008. Archived from the original on 2011-10-06.
- Gulf of Guinea Conservation Group (1999–2006) Gulf of Guinea Biodiversity Network. Accessed 1 July 2008.
- Warne, Sophie (2003) Gabon, São Tomé and Príncipe: the Bradt Travel Guide, Bradt. ISBN 1-84162-073-4
- "Sao Tome, Principe and Annobon moist lowland forests". Terrestrial Ecoregions. World Wildlife Fund. Accessed 1 July 2008.
