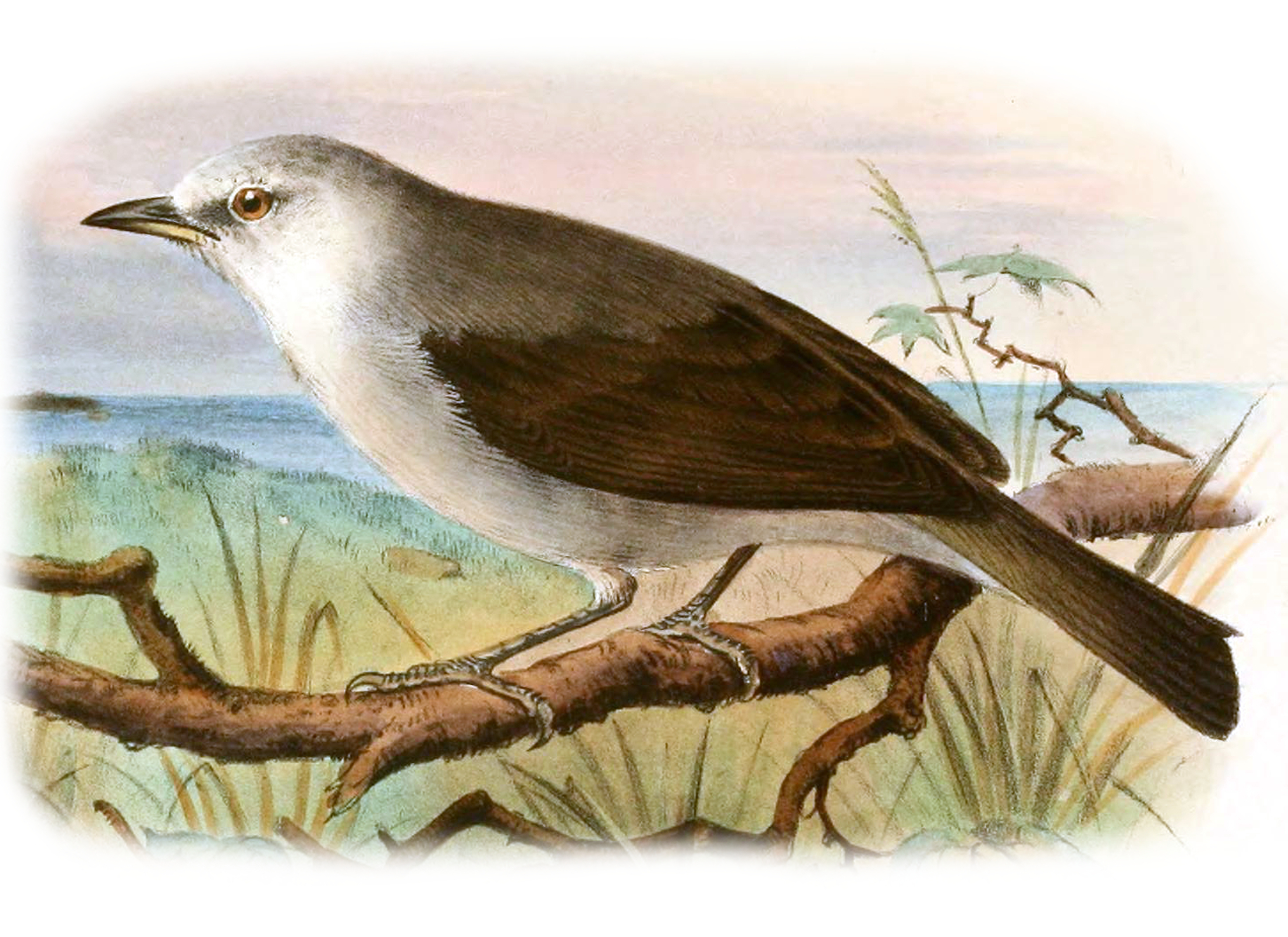
- Speirops leucophoeus

Scientific classification
- Kingdom: Animalia
- Phylum: Chordata
- Class: Aves
- Order: Passeriformes
- Family: Zosteropidae
- Genus: Zosterops; Vigors and Horsfield, 1827

= Speirops =

Genus of birds

Speirops are a group of birds in the white-eye family Zosteropidae. They are restricted to the islands of the Gulf of Guinea and a single mountain in Cameroon. It contains the following species:

- Fernando Po speirops (Zosterops brunneus)
- Príncipe speirops (Zosterops leucophaeus)
- Black-capped speirops (Zosterops lugubris)
- Mount Cameroon speirops (Zosterops melanocephalus)
