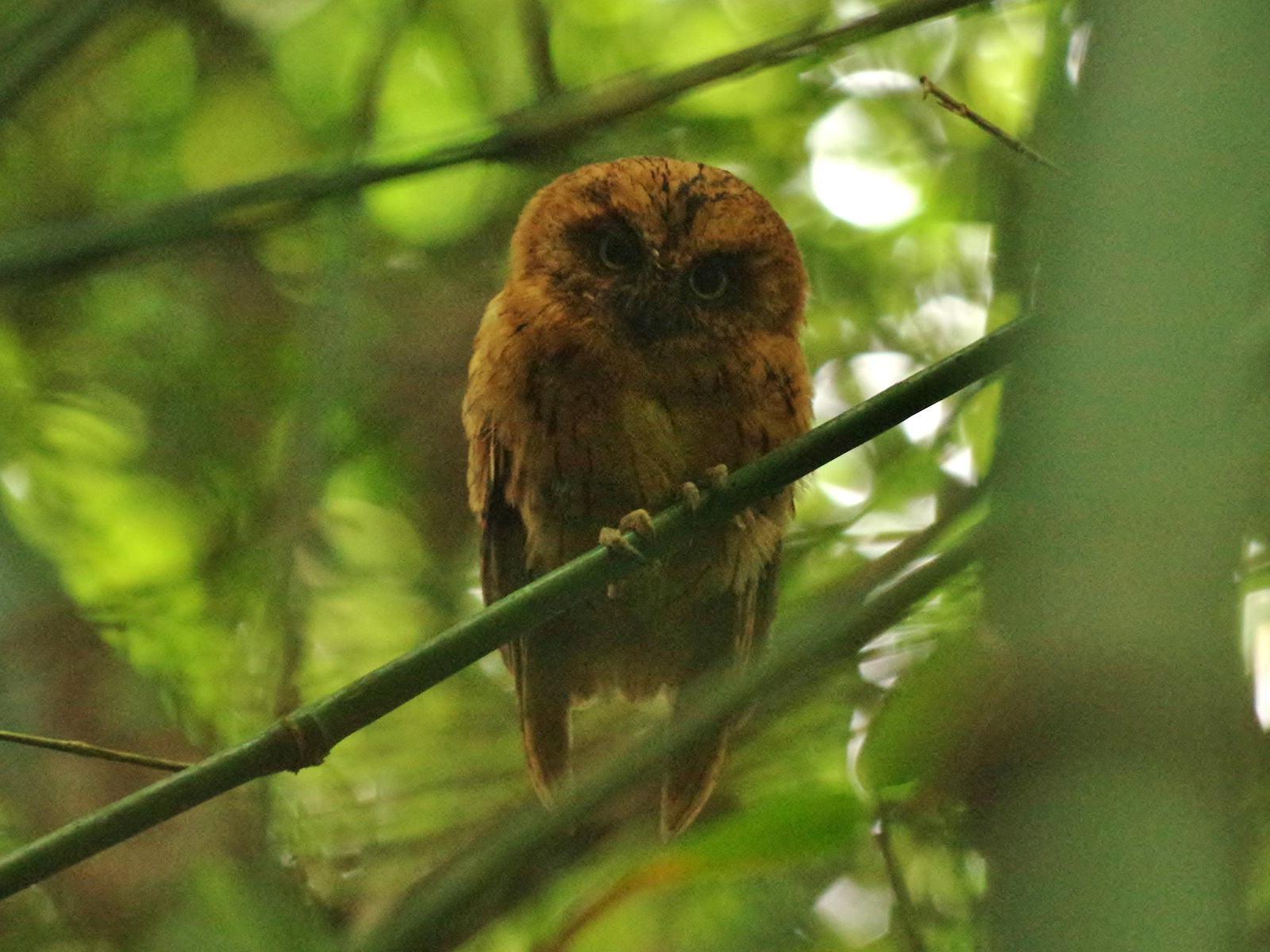

Conservation status
- Vulnerable (IUCN 3.1)
- CITES Appendix II

Scientific classification
- Kingdom: Animalia
- Phylum: Chordata
- Class: Aves
- Order: Strigiformes
- Family: Strigidae
- Genus: Otus
- Species: O. hartlaubi

Binomial name
- Otus hartlaubi (Giebel, 1872)

= São Tomé scops owl =

Species of owl

The São Tomé scops owl (Otus hartlaubi) is a species of owl in the true owl family, Strigidae. It is endemic to São Tomé Island, part of São Tomé and Príncipe, in the Gulf of Guinea, off the western equatorial coast of Central Africa.

== Description ==
The São Tomé scops owl is a small, secretive owl with small ear-tufts. It has a light reddish-brown facial disc with a white chin and white eyebrows. The crown and upper-parts are chestnut with rufous wavy markings and black shaft streaks. Their scapulars have white spots and black tips. The flight feathers are buff with white mottling and narrow. There are buff bars on the tail. The underparts are rufous with fine vermiculations of brown and white and bold black streaking. Juveniles are paler. It is a small owl, about 18 cm (7.1 in) long, weighing about 79 g (2.8 oz). Females of the species are somewhat larger than males.

=== Voice ===
The São Tomé scops owl's voice is a high-pitched 'hu-hu-hu', and also a low-pitched, raucous 'kwow'. It differs from the African scops owl (Otus senegalensis) and the flute sounds of the Eurasian scops owl (Otus scops).

== Distribution and habitat ==
This owl species is endemic to São Tomé Island, which is part of São Tomé and Príncipe, in the Gulf of Guinea, off the western equatorial coast of Central Africa.

This owl's natural habitats are subtropical or tropical moist lowland forest and subtropical or tropical moist montane forest where it is relatively widespread and the population is probably several hundred birds.

== Behaviour ==
This species of owl is the only one on the island, except for the common barn owl. Its diet consists of insects, grasshoppers, beetles, moths, and small lizards. This owl is nocturnal (like most owls) and is not shy toward humans. It roosts close to tree trunks or within them. It sometimes calls during the day.

== Conservation and status ==
The continued survival of the São Tomé scops owl depends upon stopping habitat loss in the remaining lowland rainforest of São Tomé, as does the survival of three other birds: the São Tomé ibis, São Tomé olive pigeon, and São Tomé oriole.

== See also ==
- Wildlife of São Tomé and Príncipe.
