= Mabana =

- Location in Equatorial Guinea
- Coordinates: 1°27′46″S 5°38′13″E
- Country: Equatorial Guinea
- Province: Annobón
- Elevation: 0 m (0 ft)
- Time zone: UTC+1

Mabana is a town located in the Province of Annobón in Equatorial Guinea.
