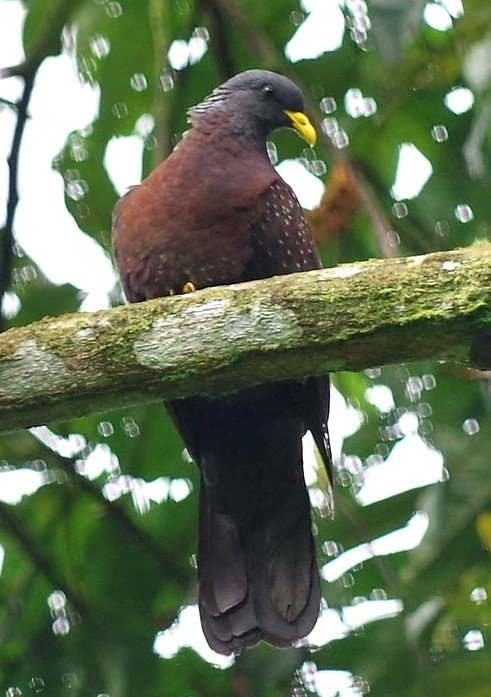

Conservation status
- Endangered (IUCN 3.1)

Scientific classification
- Kingdom: Animalia
- Phylum: Chordata
- Class: Aves
- Order: Columbiformes
- Family: Columbidae
- Genus: Columba
- Species: C. thomensis

Binomial name
- Columba thomensis Barboza du Bocage, 1888
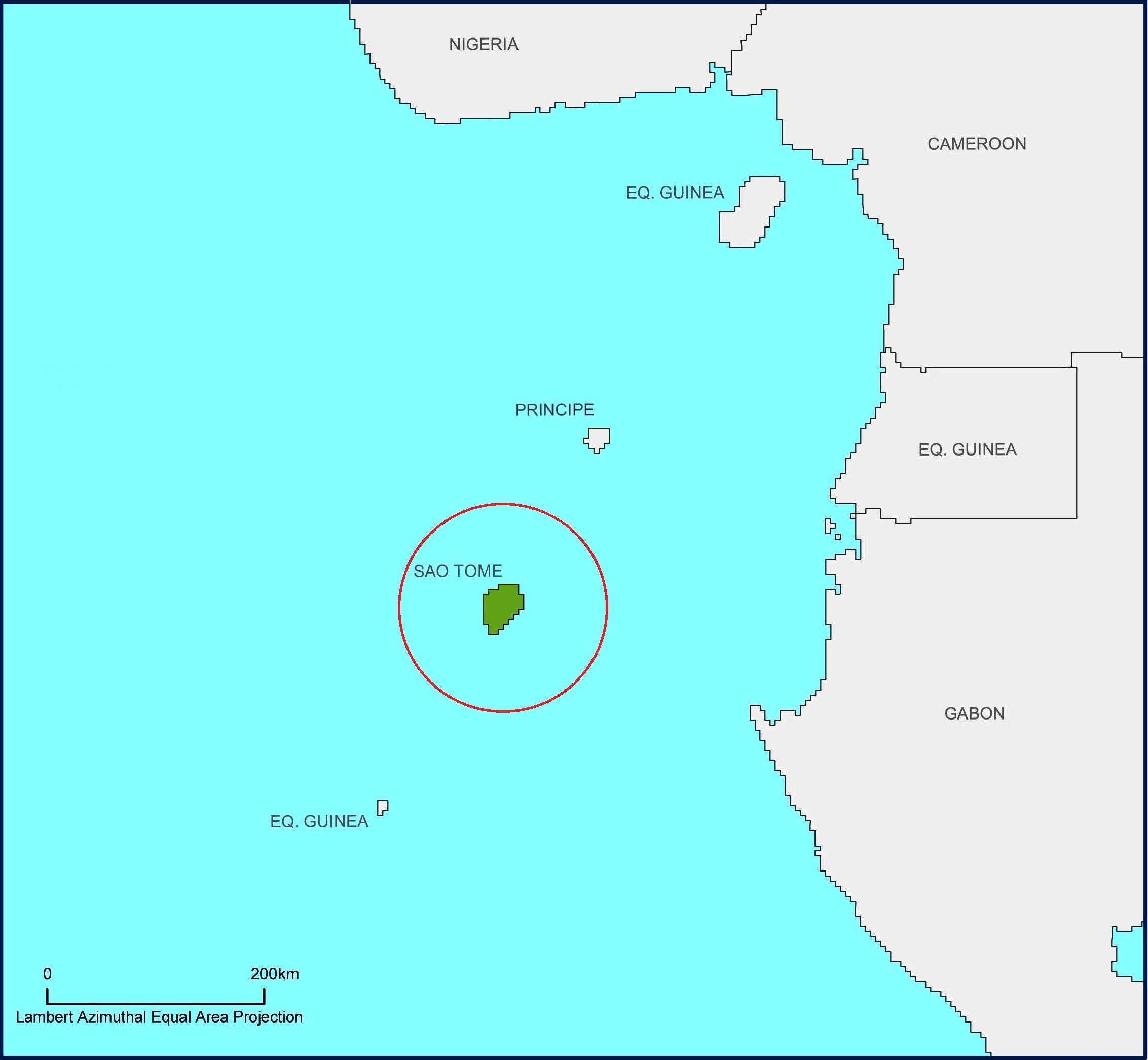
- range

= São Tomé olive pigeon =

Species of bird

The São Tomé olive pigeon or maroon pigeon (Columba thomensis) is an endangered species of pigeon which is endemic to the island of São Tomé off the coast of western Africa. It was described by José Vicente Barbosa du Bocage in 1888.

== Description ==
The bird is 37 to 40 centimetres (15 to 16 in) long. It has a grayish head, a burgundy body with scattered small white spots, and a bright yellow bill and legs.

== Distribution ==
The olive pigeon occurs in several parts of the island of São Tomé, including the northwest (Chamiço), the central massif (Lagoa Amelia, Zampalma, Nova Ceilão, Bombaim and the valley of Rio Io Grande near Formoso Pequeno), the southwest (valleys of the rivers Xufexufe and Ana Chaves) and in the southeast (west of Água Izé, on Pico Maria Fernandes and north of São João dos Angolares).

== Conservation and status ==
The continued survival of the São Tomé olive pigeon depends upon stopping habitat loss in the remaining lowland rainforest of São Tomé, as does the survival of three other birds: the São Tomé ibis, São Tomé oriole, and São Tomé scops owl.
