= List of mountains in São Tomé and Príncipe =

This is a list of mountains in São Tomé and Príncipe.

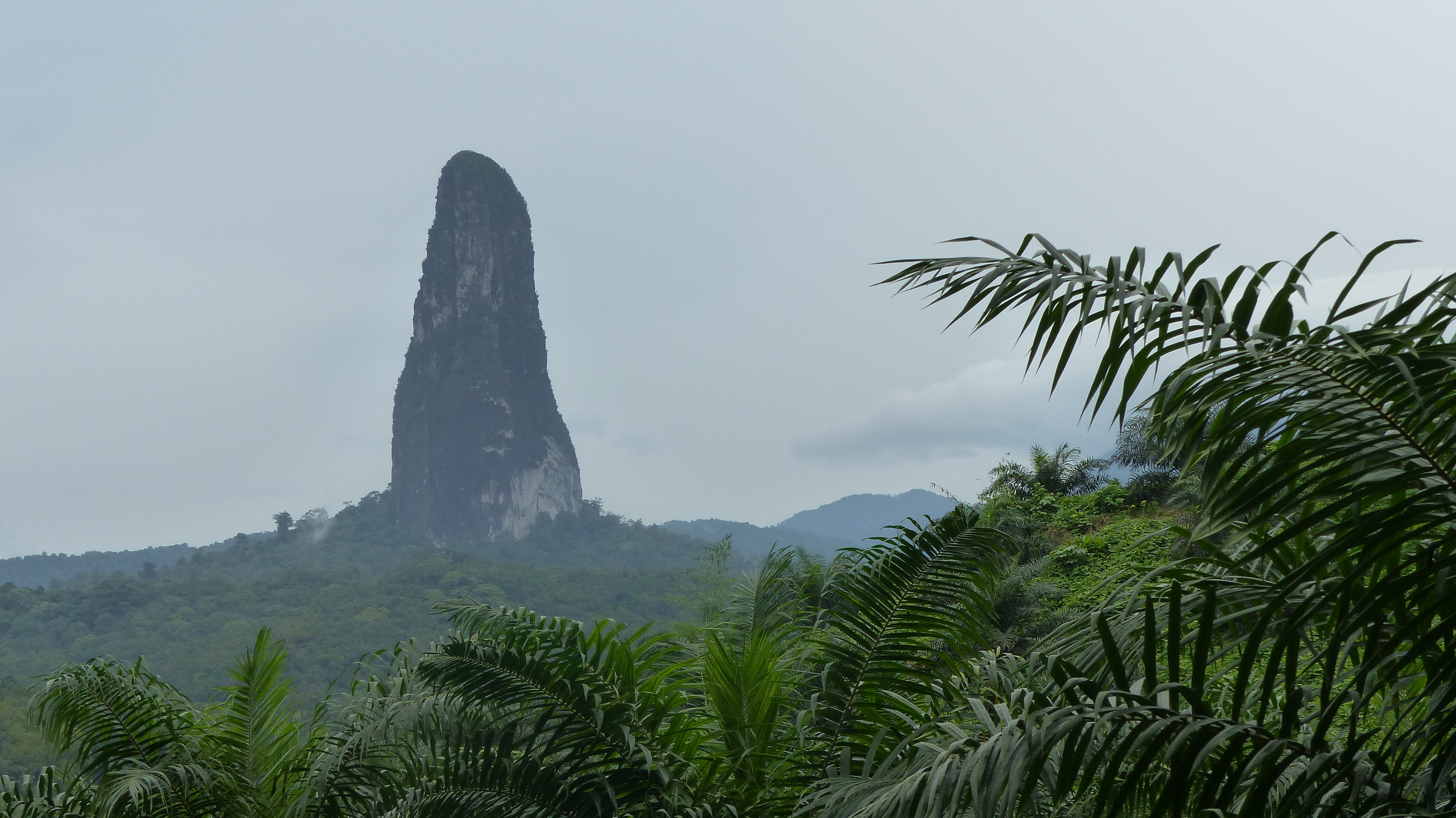
Pico Cão Grande (663 m), a volcanic plug in the south of the island of São Tomé

== List ==
Name	Island	Elevation (m)	Notes
Pico de São Tomé	São Tomé	2,024	(Note: Highest point in the island of São Tomé and the country)
Pico Ana Chaves	São Tomé	1,630	
Pico Kabumbe	São Tomé	1,403	
Pico do Príncipe	Príncipe	947	(Note: Highest point in Príncipe)
Pico Mencorne	Príncipe	921	
Pico Maria Fernandes	São Tomé	861	
Pico Papagaio	Príncipe	680	
Pico Cão Grande	São Tomé	663	
Pico Cão Pequeno	São Tomé	390	

== See also ==
- Lists of mountains by region
- Geography of São Tomé and Príncipe
