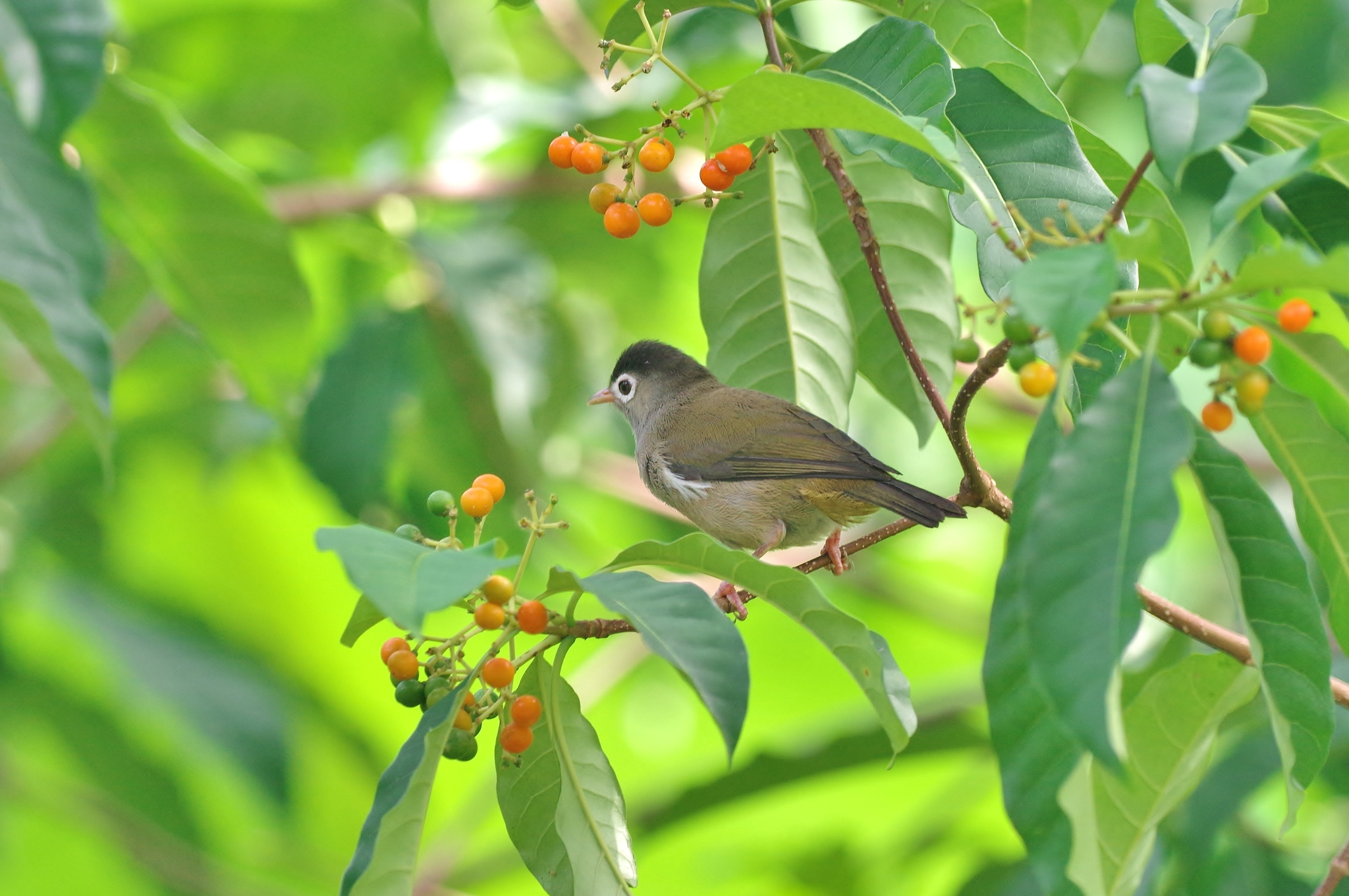

Conservation status
- Least Concern (IUCN 3.1)

Scientific classification
- Kingdom: Animalia
- Phylum: Chordata
- Class: Aves
- Order: Passeriformes
- Family: Zosteropidae
- Genus: Zosterops
- Species: Z. lugubris

Binomial name
- Zosterops lugubris Hartlaub, 1848
- range on São Tomé

Synonyms
- Speirops lugubris (Hartlaub, 1848)

= Black-capped speirops =

Species of bird

The black-capped speirops (Zosterops lugubris) is a species of bird in the family Zosteropidae. It was previously placed in the genus Speirops. It is endemic to São Tomé in São Tomé and Príncipe.
