= Xufexufe =

River on the island of São Tomé

Coordinates: 0.1280°N 6.4938°E

Rio Xufexufe

Location
- Country: São Tomé and Príncipe
- Island: São Tomé Island

Physical characteristics
- Mouth: Atlantic Ocean

Rio Xufexufe is a river in the island of São Tomé, São Tomé and Príncipe. The river flows southward through the southern part of the Lembá District and empties into the Atlantic Ocean between the beaches of Palma and Pipa, 10 km northwest of Vila Malanza. Its catchment area is 16.5 km^{2} (6.4 sq mi). The endangered birds São Tomé olive pigeon (Columba thomensis) and São Tomé fiscal (Lanius newtoni) have been observed in the catchment of the river.
