= Begonia crateris =

Conservation status
- Endangered (IUCN 3.1)

Scientific classification
- Kingdom: Plantae
- Clade: Tracheophytes
- Clade: Angiosperms
- Clade: Eudicots
- Clade: Rosids
- Order: Cucurbitales
- Family: Begoniaceae
- Genus: Begonia
- Species: B. crateris

Binomial name
- Begonia crateris Exell, 1944

Species of flowering plant

Begonia crateris is a plant species of the genus Begonia in the family Begoniaceae, first described by Arthur Wallis Exell in 1944. It is endemic to São Tomé Island, and grows up to 3 metres tall. It closest relative is Begonia baccata, also endemic to São Tomé.
