= Pico do Príncipe =

Mountain on Príncipe in the Gulf of Guinea

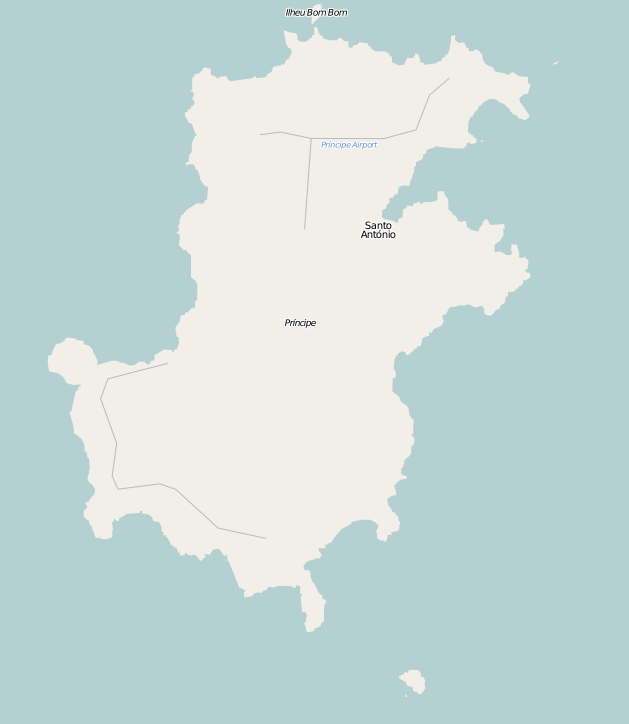
- Location within Príncipe

Highest point
- Elevation: 947 m (3,107 ft)
- Prominence: 947 m (3,107 ft)
- Listing: Island high point
- Coordinates: 1°34′47″N 7°22′56″E

Geography
- Location: Southern Príncipe Island, São Tomé and Príncipe

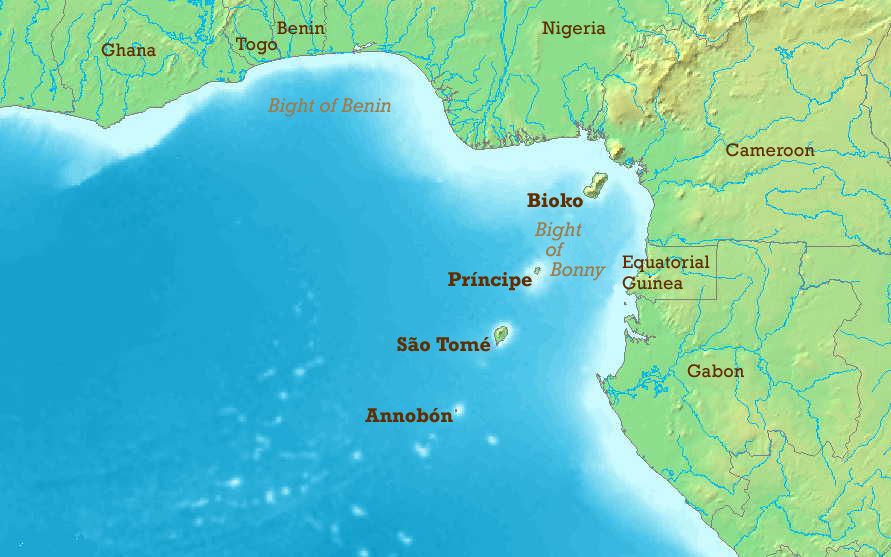
Map of the Gulf of Guinea, showing Principe in the chain of islands formed by the Cameroon line of volcanoes.

Pico do Príncipe is a mountain on the island of Príncipe, the smaller of the two inhabited islands of São Tomé and Príncipe. The elevation of the mountain is 947 metres (3,107 ft), making it the highest peak on the island. The island is one of the volcanic swells that make up the Cameroon line of extinct and active volcanoes.

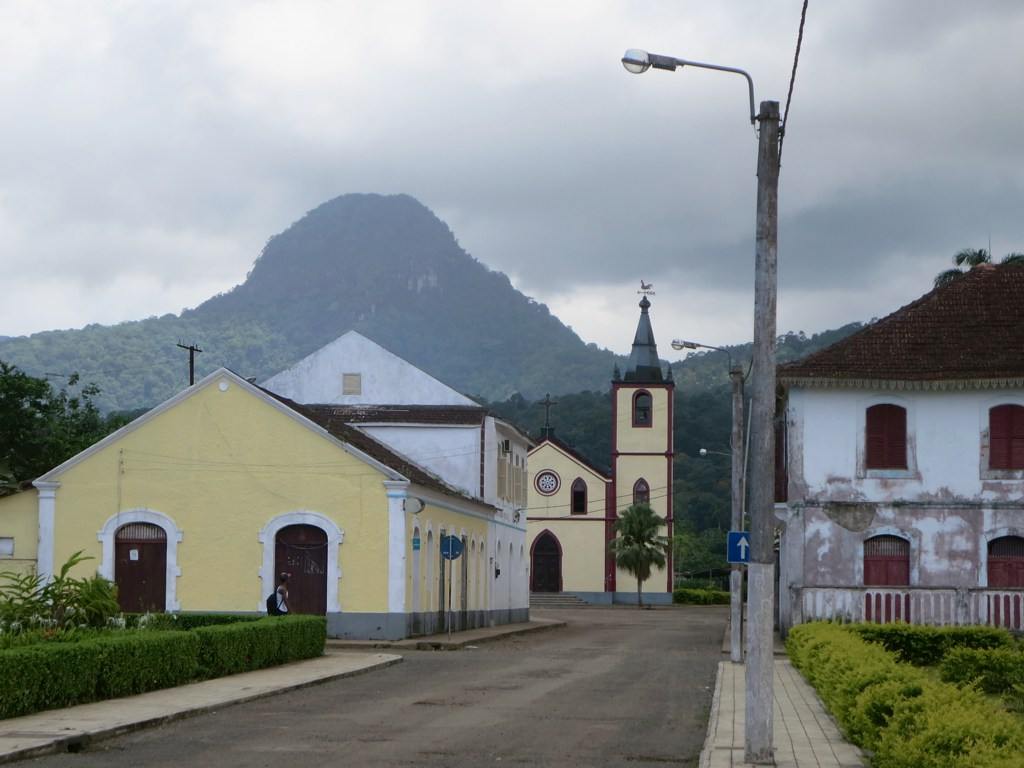
Pico Papagaio, the peak north of Pico do Príncipe

== Topology ==
The mountain is the remains of a volcano that has been inactive for 15.7 million years. The volcanoes on this island were at first primarily basalt, but later phonolite intruded in their cores. The basalt has been deeply eroded, leaving spectacular towers of the harder phonolite rising almost vertically from the rainforest.

The peak has only occasionally been explored, with the first expedition in 1929 having established a base on the top. A second trip was made in 1956, but could not make a serious botanical inventory due to poor weather. The 1999 trip found that the mountain rises from a heavily forested plateau with elevation 600 to 700 metres (2,000 to 2,300 ft). From there, a series of ridges lead to the summit. At higher elevations the trees are more open and there are more epiphytes - plants that grow on the trees. The summit is a small mound surrounded on three sides by precipices.

== Ecology ==
The 1999 expedition was by members of Ecofac, a Non-Government Organization that plans to assist in conservation through helping to develop ecotourism on the island. The ecology of the forests on and around the mountain has not been well-researched, but some endemic species of birds and orchids have been found, and it seem clear that there are many endemic plants and insects. A proposed conservation zone covering one third of Principe would include this mountain and three others higher than 500m: Mesa (537m), Pico Papagaio (680m) and Pico Mencorne (921m). 28 species of birds have been recorded in the area, of which seven are endemic to Principe and four are of global conservation concern. Other endemic species are the skink Feylinia polylepis, the burrowing snake Typhlops elegans and the frog Leptopelis palmatus. An endemic sub-species of the shrew Crocidura poensis is also present.

== See also ==
- List of mountains in São Tomé and Príncipe
