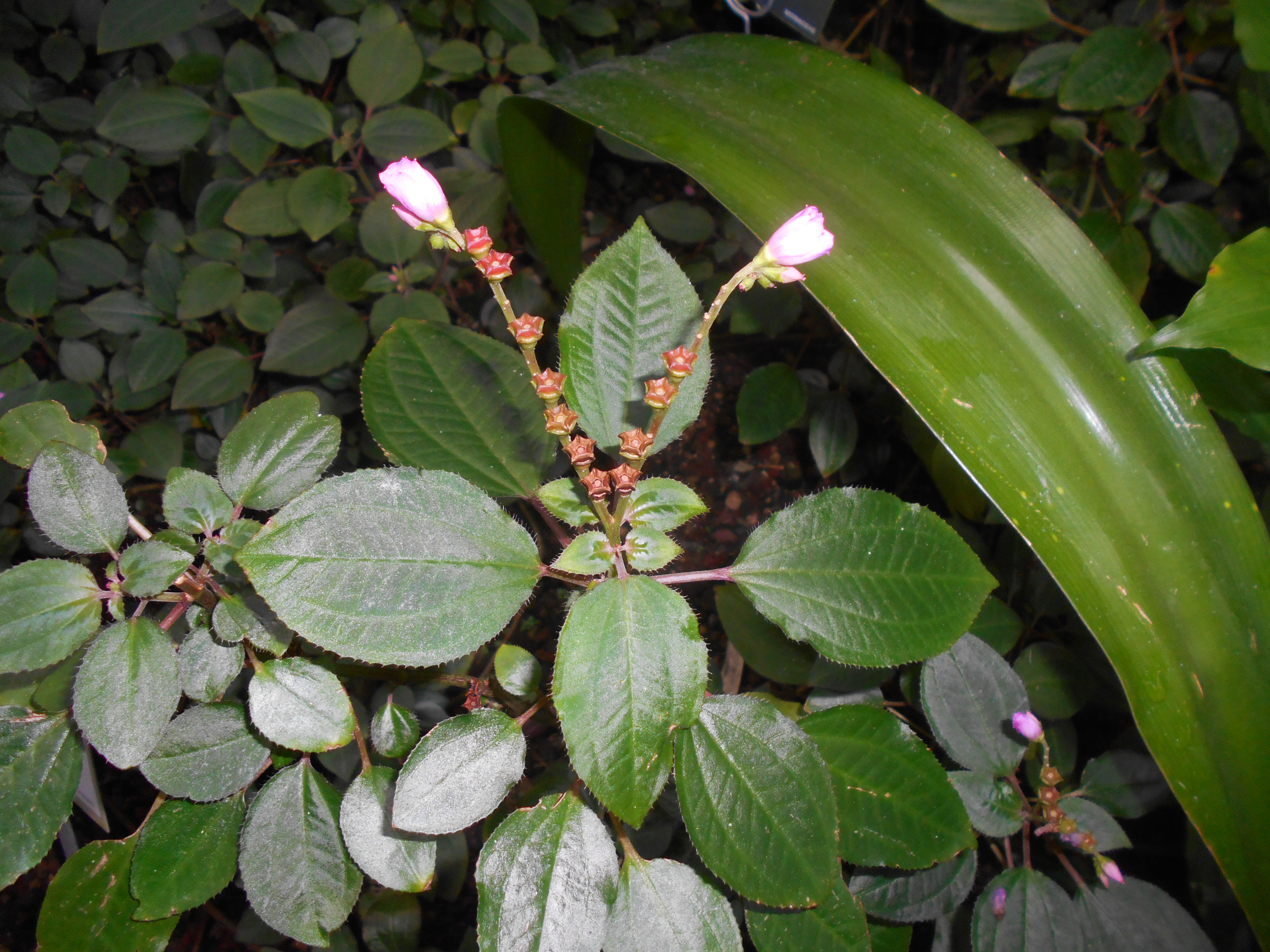
- Calvoa orientalis

Scientific classification
- Kingdom: Plantae
- Clade: Tracheophytes
- Clade: Angiosperms
- Clade: Eudicots
- Clade: Rosids
- Order: Myrtales
- Family: Melastomataceae
- Genus: Calvoa; Hook.f.

= Calvoa =

Genus of flowering plants

Calvoa is a genus of flowering plants belonging to the family Melastomataceae.

Its native range is Africa.

Species:

- Calvoa angolensis A.Fern. & R.Fern.
- Calvoa confertifolia Exell
- Calvoa crassinoda Hook.f. ex Triana
- Calvoa grandifolia Cogn.
- Calvoa hirsuta Hook.f. ex Triana
- Calvoa integrifolia Cogn.
- Calvoa jacques-felixii Figueiredo
- Calvoa leonardii Jacq.-Fél.
- Calvoa maculata M.E.Leal
- Calvoa monticola A.Chev., Hutch. & Dalziel
- Calvoa orientalis Taub.
- Calvoa pulcherrima Gilg ex Engl.
- Calvoa sapinii De Wild.
- Calvoa seretii De Wild.
- Calvoa sinuata Hook.f. ex Triana
- Calvoa sitaeana Jacq.-Fél.
- Calvoa stenophylla Jacq.-Fél.
- Calvoa subquinquenervia De Wild.
- Calvoa trochainii Jacq.-Fél.
- Calvoa zenkeri Gilg ex Engl.
