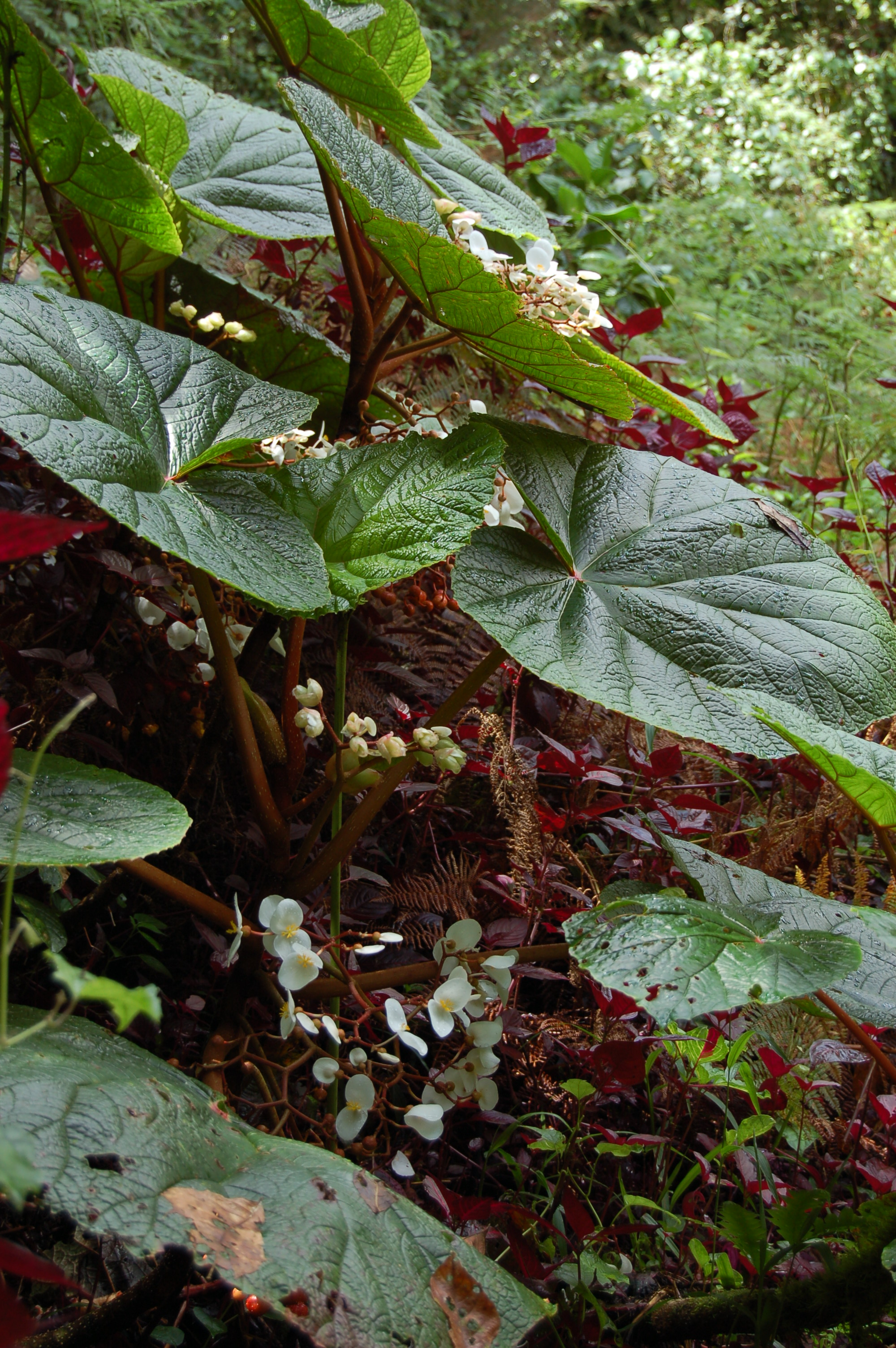

Conservation status
- Least Concern (IUCN 3.1)

Scientific classification
- Kingdom: Plantae
- Clade: Tracheophytes
- Clade: Angiosperms
- Clade: Eudicots
- Clade: Rosids
- Order: Cucurbitales
- Family: Begoniaceae
- Genus: Begonia
- Species: B. baccata

Binomial name
- Begonia baccata Hook.f.

= Begonia baccata =

Species of flowering plant

Begonia baccata is a plant species of the genus Begonia in the family Begoniaceae, first described by Joseph Dalton Hooker in 1866. It is endemic to São Tomé Island, and grows up to 4 metres tall. It closest relative is Begonia crateris, also endemic to São Tomé.

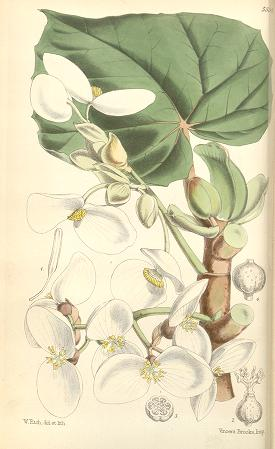
Illustration of Begonia baccata
