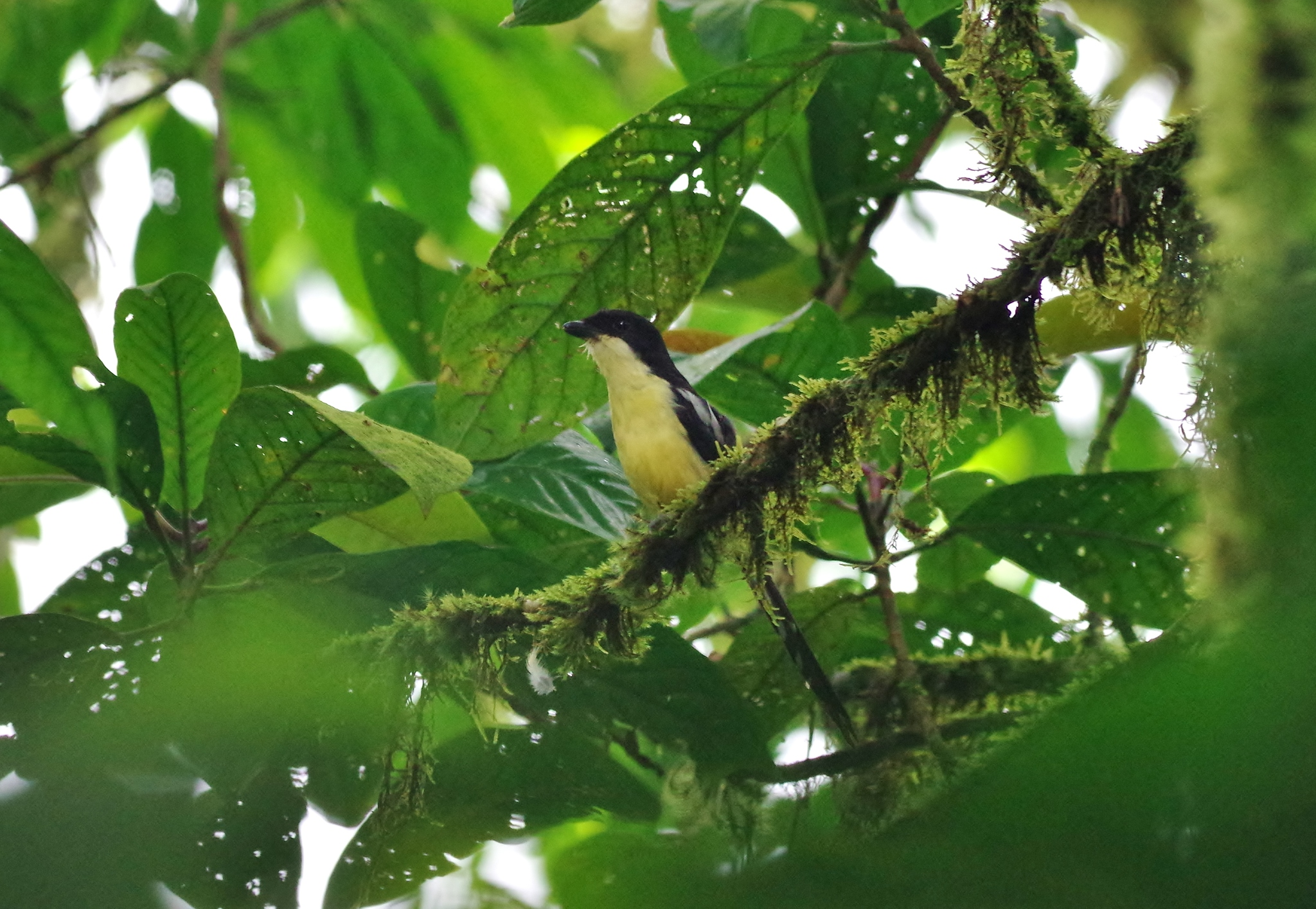

Conservation status
- Critically Endangered (IUCN 3.1)

Scientific classification
- Kingdom: Animalia
- Phylum: Chordata
- Class: Aves
- Order: Passeriformes
- Family: Laniidae
- Genus: Lanius
- Species: L. newtoni

Binomial name
- Lanius newtoni Barboza du Bocage, 1891
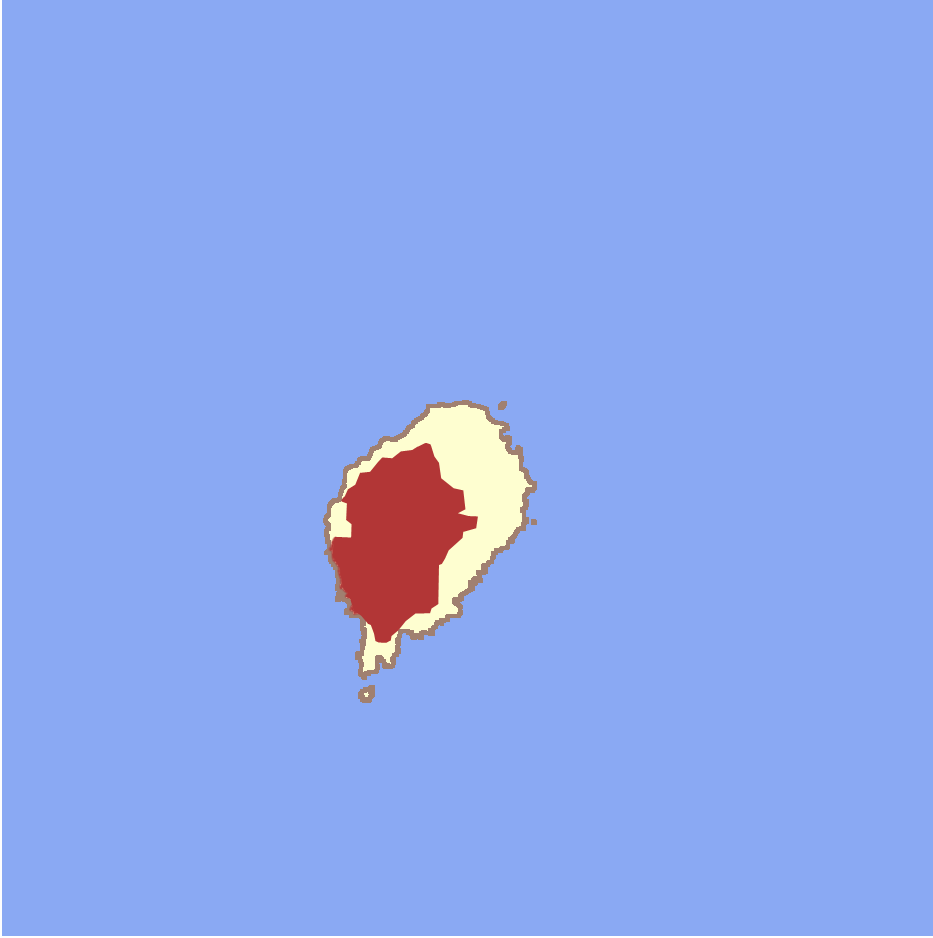
- Distribution of the São Tomé fiscal

= São Tomé fiscal =

Species of bird

The São Tomé fiscal (Lanius newtoni), or Newton's fiscal, is a species of bird in the family Laniidae. It is endemic to São Tomé Island, São Tomé and Príncipe. It is 20 to 21 centimeters long. The bird is black above with a white shoulder-scapular bar. The São Tomé fiscal has a pale yellow chin, breast, belly, flanks vent and under tail. Its graduated tail has all black central tail feathers and an increasing amount of white on outer web from inner to outer tail feathers. The Lanius newtoni has a clear voice with a whistle tiuh tiuh often repeated and metallic tsink tsink audible over a long distance.

The species lives on the island of São Tomé and is usually found under closed canopy. Its natural habitats are subtropical or tropical moist lowland forests and subtropical or tropical moist montane forests.

== Status ==
The São Tomé fiscal is a very rare bird. There were records of sightings in 1888 and again in 1928. Another individual was sighted in 1990 near the source of the Rio Xufexufe, and a number of birds have been spotted since then. All sightings have been in primary forest with rocky areas but little undergrowth, sometimes on low ridges or beside watercourses, and always below 1,400 m (4,600 ft). This type of habitat is decreasing as forests are cut to create coffee and cocoa plantations, and the building of new hydropower plants is another possible threat, even though it is a protected area (Parque Natural Obô de São Tomé). According to 2020 estimations, there are 50-249 mature individuals in the wild, it is considered to be a critically endangered bird by the International Union for Conservation of Nature.

== Threats ==
=== Historical Land Use and Forest Degradation ===
Historically, extensive areas of lowland and mid-altitude forests were cleared to make way for cocoa and coffee plantations. Although these plantations were subsequently abandoned, they left behind vast tracts of secondary forest. Unfortunately, this secondary forest is ill-suited for the São Tomé fiscal. Timber extraction, alongside the expansion and intensification of agriculture, pose further threats to the existing forested areas.

=== Predatory Threats ===
The presence of introduced species, including the Black rat, Mona monkey, African civet, and Feral cat, raises concerns regarding potential predators that may impact the São Tomé fiscal's survival in its environment. These non-native species can threaten the bird's nests and overall well-being.
