= Quioveo =

Extinct volcano in Equatorial Guinea

Coordinates: 1°26′13″S 5°37′59″E

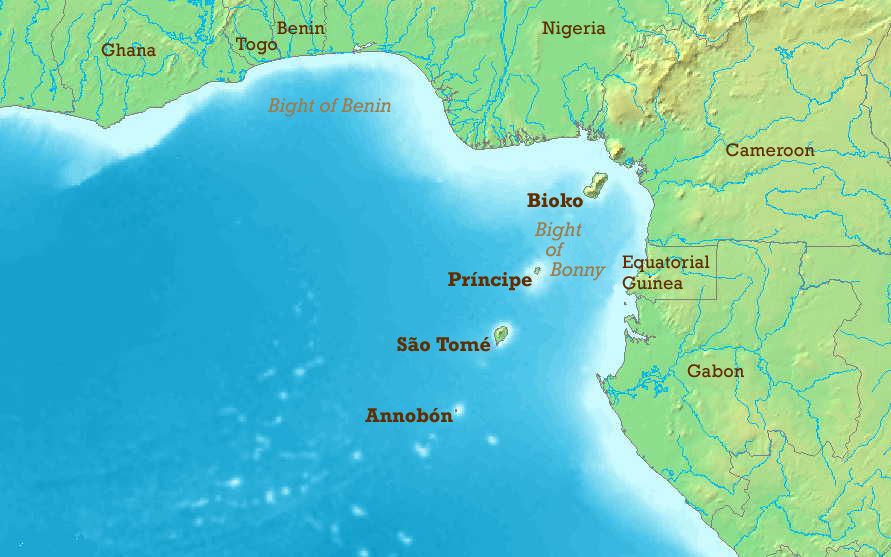
Map of the Gulf of Guinea, showing São Tomé, Príncipe, and Annobón.

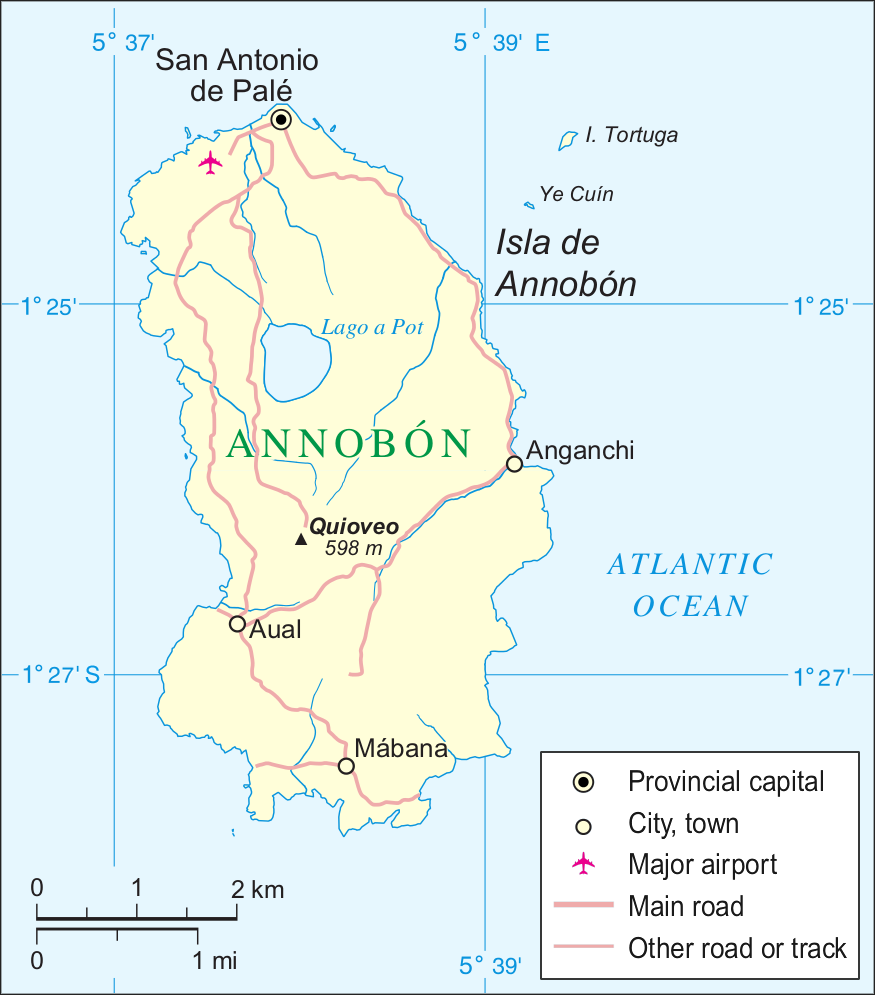
Map of Annobón showing the location of Quioveo on the island.

Quioveo is the extinct volcanic peak at the centre of the island of Annobón, Equatorial Guinea. It rises to a height of 598 metres.

The island of Annobón is part of the Cameroon line of volcanoes, together with the islands of São Tomé Island, Príncipe, Bioko, and Mount Cameroon on the African mainland.
