= Palm forest tree frog =

Conservation status
- Endangered (IUCN 3.1)

Scientific classification
- Kingdom: Animalia
- Phylum: Chordata
- Class: Amphibia
- Order: Anura
- Family: Arthroleptidae
- Genus: Leptopelis
- Species: L. palmatus

Binomial name
- Leptopelis palmatus (Peters, 1868)
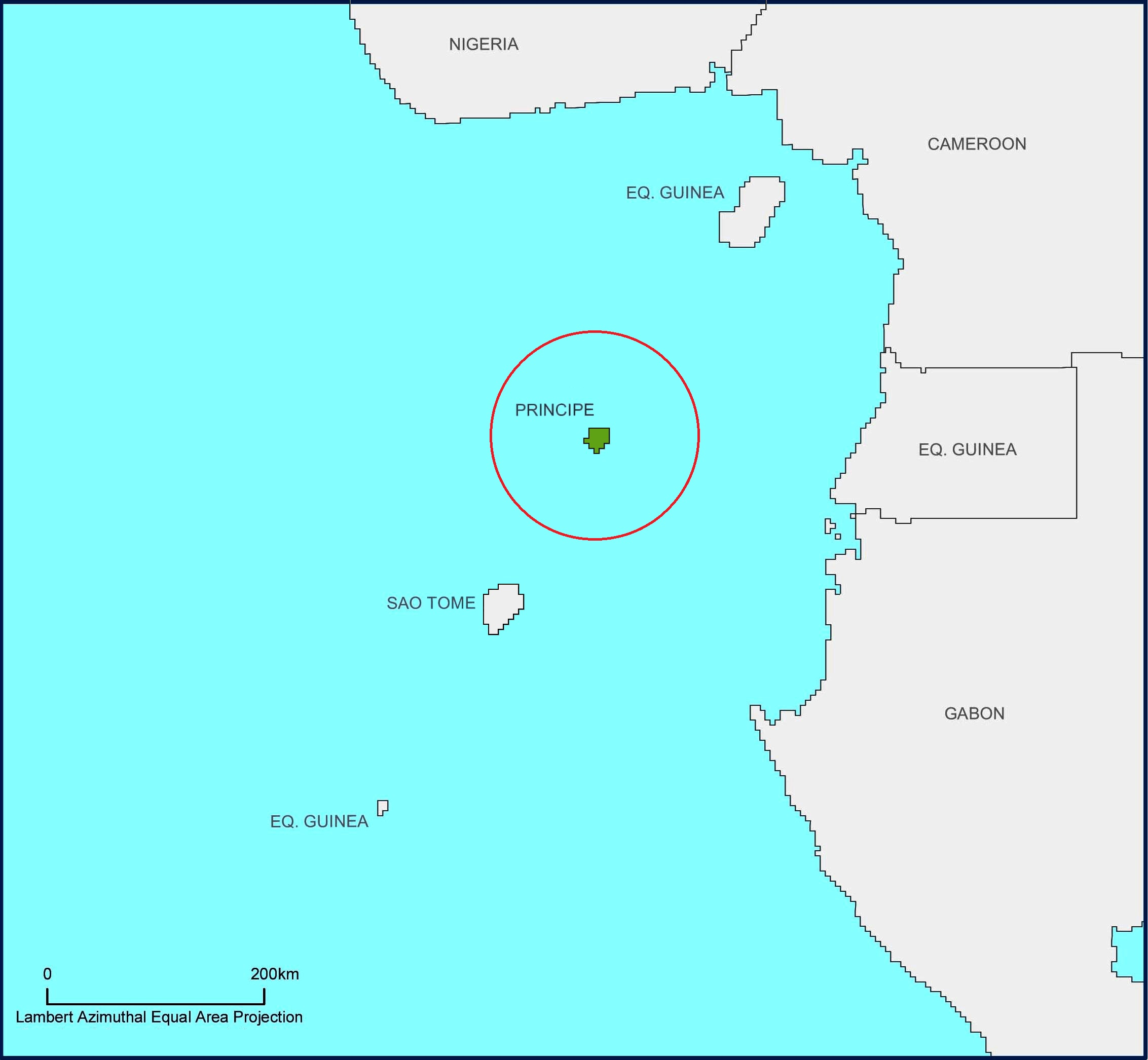
- range

Synonyms
- Hylambates palmatus Peters, 1868

Species of amphibian

The palm forest tree frog (Leptopelis palmatus) is a species of frog in the family Arthroleptidae which is endemic to Príncipe island in São Tomé and Príncipe. Red tree frog Leptopelis rufus from the African mainland was for a long time included in this species, but is now considered a distinct species.

== Description ==
The palm forest tree frog is a large species: females measure 81–110 mm (3.2–4.3 in) in snout–vent length. The tympanum is large and the feet are fully webbed. The colouring varies, but the dorsum is typically dark green to black, sometimes with many light spots giving the frog a marbled appearance. The ventrum is dark and has a granular surface. Compared to the red tree frog, this species has larger choanae (the apertures where the nasal passages join the throat), larger tympani and differences in skin texture.

== Habitat and conservation ==
The natural habitats of palm forest tree frog are wet forests along the edges of creeks and streams to 700 m (2,300 ft) above sea level, possibly to 1000 m. It also occurs in forest remnants and possibly in towns. It is believed that eggs are buried close to water; when they hatch, the tadpoles move into pools or streams where they complete their development.

It is a reasonably common species throughout the island, although habitat loss through development is a potential future threat. This frog is not present in any protected areas, and the International Union for Conservation of Nature has assessed its conservation status as being "endangered", and considers that the population requires careful monitoring.
