= São Tomé shorttail =

Conservation status
- Vulnerable (IUCN 3.1)

Scientific classification
- Kingdom: Animalia
- Phylum: Chordata
- Class: Aves
- Order: Passeriformes
- Family: Motacillidae
- Genus: Motacilla
- Species: M. bocagii

Binomial name
- Motacilla bocagii (Sharpe, 1892)

Synonyms
- Amaurocichla bocagii Sharpe, 1892; Amaurocichla bocagei Sharpe, 1892 [orth. error]

Species of bird

The São Tomé shorttail (Motacilla bocagii), also known as Bocage's longbill, is a species of passerine bird in the family Motacillidae. It has been classified as the sole member of the genus Amaurocichla, but a 2015 phylogenetic study placed it among the wagtails in the genus Motacilla. It is endemic to the central and southern parts of the island of São Tomé. Its natural habitat is subtropical or tropical moist lowland forests. This species has a small population and is threatened by habitat loss.
