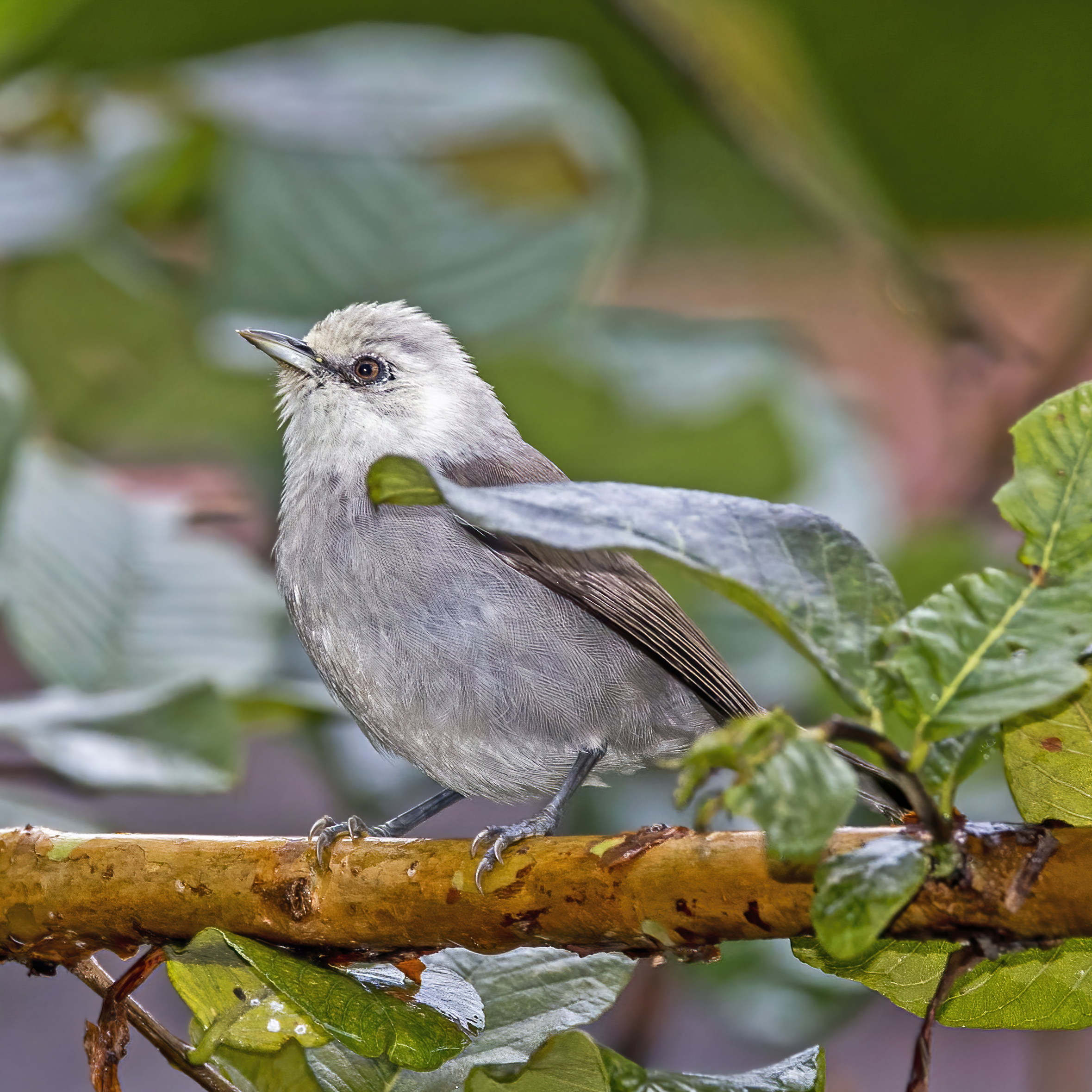

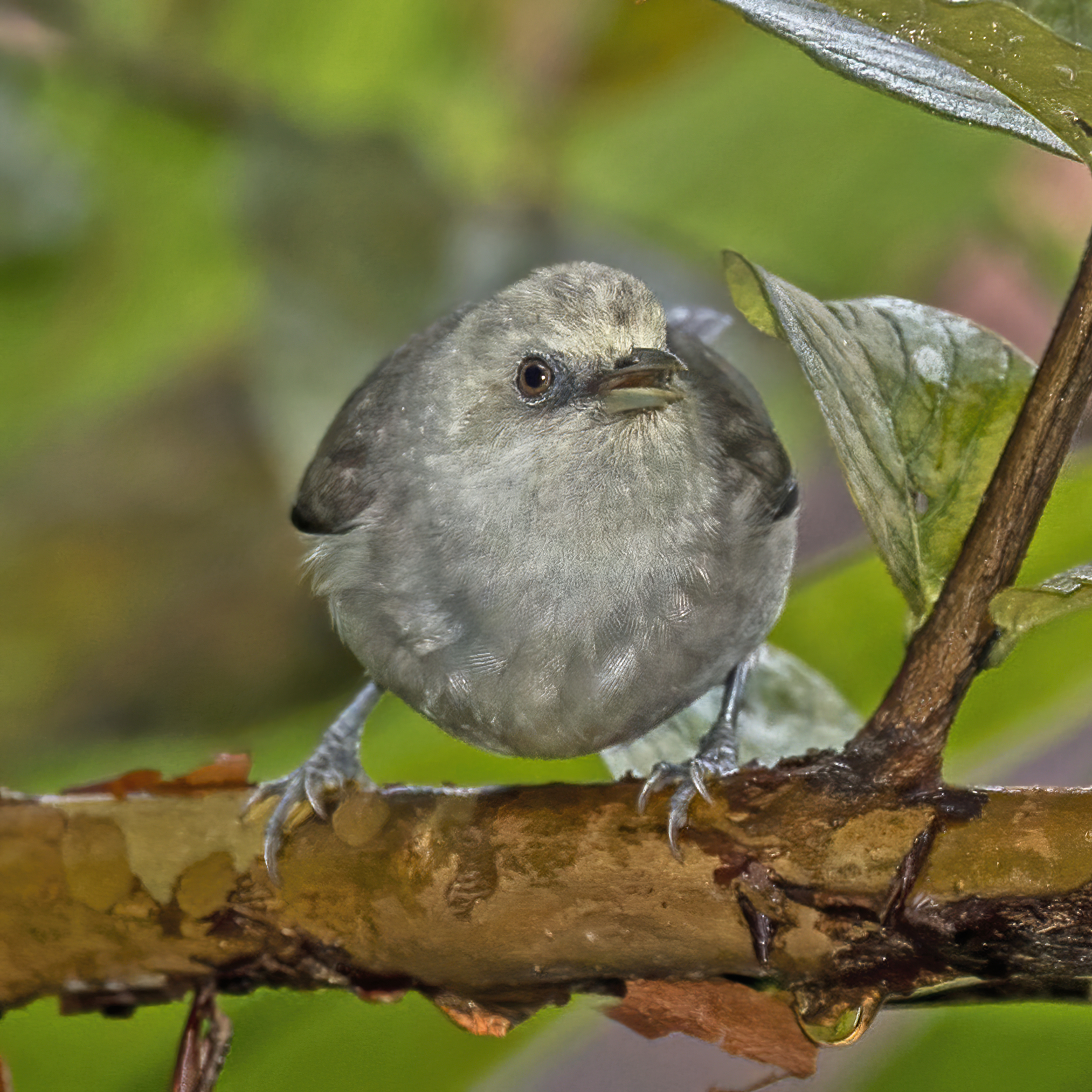
- Príncipe island

Conservation status
- Least Concern (IUCN 3.1)

Scientific classification
- Kingdom: Animalia
- Phylum: Chordata
- Class: Aves
- Order: Passeriformes
- Family: Zosteropidae
- Genus: Zosterops
- Species: Z. leucophaeus

Binomial name
- Zosterops leucophaeus (Hartlaub, 1857)
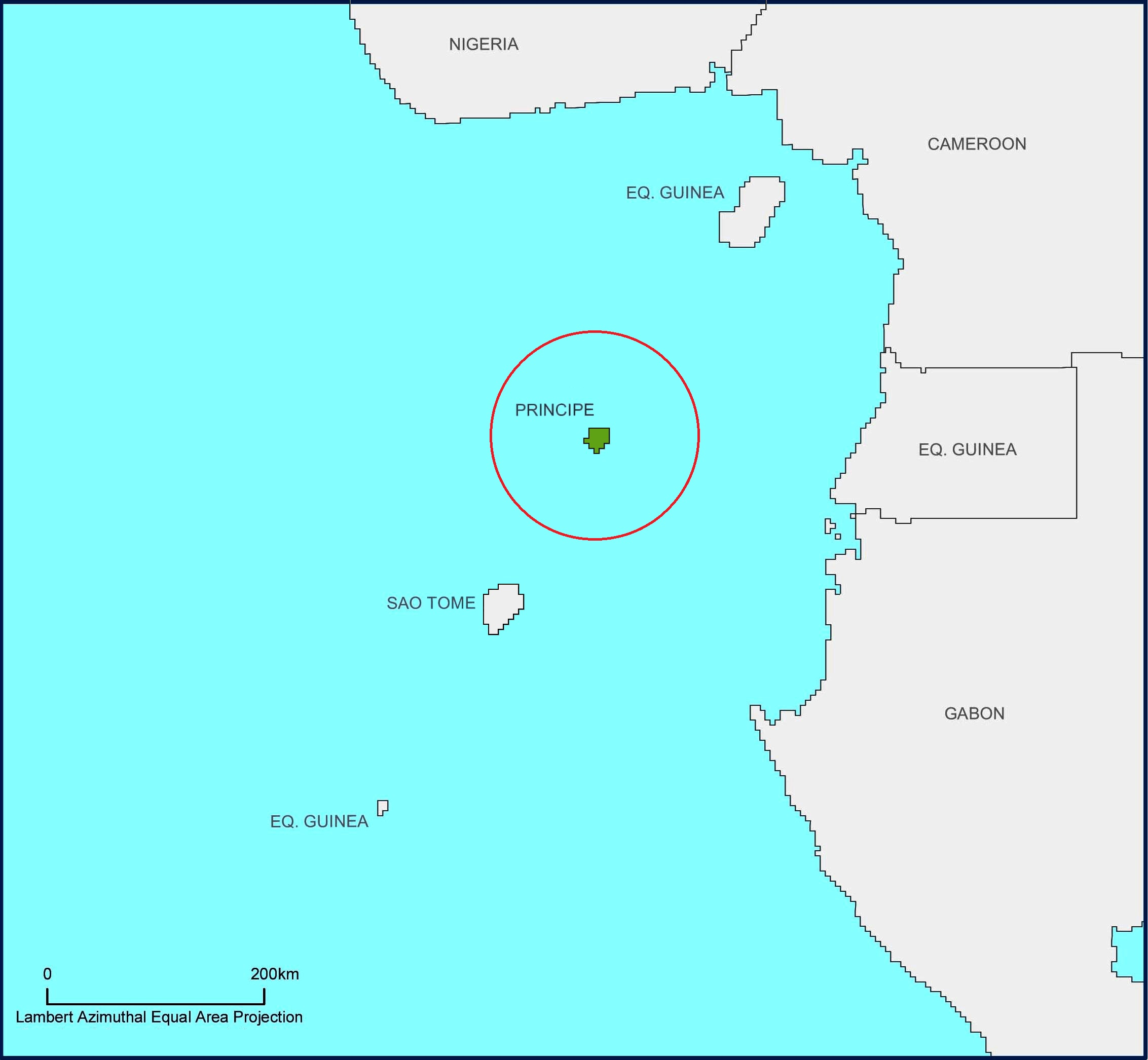
- range

Synonyms
- Speirops leucophaeus Hartlaub, 1857; Speirops leucophoeus Hartlaub, 1857

= Príncipe speirops =

Species of bird

The Príncipe speirops (Zosterops leucophaeus) is a species of bird in the family Zosteropidae. It is endemic to the island of Príncipe in São Tomé and Príncipe. Its natural habitats are subtropical or tropical moist lowland forests and plantations. It is threatened by habitat loss.
