= Annobón =

Southern island province of Equatorial Guinea

- Province
- Annobón circled in red, within Equatorial Guinea (far southwestern corner of the map)
- Country: Equatorial Guinea
- Capital: San Antonio de Palé

Area
  - Total: 20.9 km^{2} (8.1 sq mi)
- Highest elevation (Quioveo): 598 m (1,962 ft)

Population (2015)
  - Total: 5,323
  - Density: 255/km^{2} (660/sq mi)
- ISO 3166 code: GQ-AN

Designations

Ramsar Wetland
- Official name: Isla de Annobón
- Designated: 2 June 2003
- Reference no.: 1309

Location of Annobón Island in the Atlantic Ocean

Annobón (Spanish: [anoˈβon]; Portuguese: Ano-Bom) is a province of Equatorial Guinea. The province consists of the island of Annobón and its associated islets in the Gulf of Guinea. Annobón is the smallest province of Equatorial Guinea in both area and population. According to the 2015 census, Annobón had 5,323 inhabitants, a small population increase from the 5,008 registered by the 2001 census. The official language is Spanish but most of the inhabitants speak a creole form of Portuguese. The island's main industries are fishing and forestry.

Annobón is the only island of the country located in the Southern Hemisphere of the Atlantic Ocean. The provincial capital is San Antonio de Palé on the north side of the island. There are three other small settlements; Mabana, San Pedro and Aual. As of 1911, some passing ships visited for water and fresh provisions, of which Annobón offered an abundant supply. However, there was no regular shipping service to the rest of Equatorial Guinea, and ships called as infrequently as every few months.

== Name ==
Annobón derives its name from Portuguese ano bom 'good year'. The island was named for the date of its discovery by the Portuguese on New Year's Day in 1473. The province was formerly known as Anno Bom or Annabona.

During the final years of the Francisco Macías Nguema administration, the island was called Pigalu or Pagalu, from the Portuguese papagaio 'parrot'.

== History ==
The island was discovered by the Portuguese on 1 January 1473; it obtained its name from that date ("New Year"). However, Spanish explorer Diego Ramirez de la Diaz first spotted the island in 1470 and named it San Antonio. It was apparently uninhabited until colonized under the Portuguese from 1474, primarily by enslaved Africans from Angola via São Tomé Island. These slaves (who the Portuguese called escravos de regate) are considered the first members of Annobonese society.

Beginning in the early 16th century, many of these slaves who were now marrying Europeans gave birth to the next generations of Annobonese who were called forros (slaves about to be free). Forros began to develop a distinct identity and socio-economic powers. This period also saw the emergence of the Annobonese Creole language.

The island was passed to Spain by the 1778 Treaty of El Pardo. The treaty granted Spain control of the Portuguese islands of Annobón and Fernando Po (now Bioko) and the Guinea coast between the Niger and the Ogooué in exchange for Spanish acceptance of the Portuguese occupation of territories in Brazil west of the line established by the Treaty of Tordesillas. The Spanish colony thus formed would eventually be known as Spanish Guinea.

The island's populace was opposed to the arrangement and hostile toward the Spaniards. After the handover and when the Spanish flag was hoisted to affirm Spanish sovereignty, the islanders revolted against the newcomers, in part because they were considered heretical for placing dogs on their flag (the actual design represents lions). They expelled them according to a tradition of throwing witches to the sea. A state of anarchy ensued, leading to an arrangement by which the island was administered by a body of five natives, each of whom held the office of governor during the period that elapsed until ten ships landed at the island. This autonomous government continued, with the island claimed by both Spain and Portugal, until the authority of Spain was re-established in the latter part of the 19th century. The island briefly became part of the Elobey, Annobón and Corisco colony until 1909.

The British erected a fort at St Antony in 1801, eventually legalized through a lease from the Spanish government in 1827. The base was used by the British to suppress the Atlantic slave trade.

During the final years of the administration of Francisco Macías Nguema, the first president of Equatorial Guinea, the island was called Pigalu or Pagalu. The population felt prejudice against them in Equatorial Guinea and some began advocating separatist movements. In 1993, the central government isolated the island, expelling foreigners including humanitarian organizations. The population rebelled and attacked the governor's residence. The government replied with two extrajudicial executions. International pressure eased hostilities, and political prisoners were released.

It was mostly due to this small island that Equatorial Guinea asked for observer status just after the Community of Portuguese Language Countries was formed in 1996, which led to a visit to Equatorial Guinea, in 1998, by the Portuguese foreign minister, Jaime Gama. Its historic, ethnographic, and religious identity is reflected in its provincial flag. In 2006, Equatorial Guinea achieved observer status with the hand of São Tomé and Príncipe. It kept lobbying to become a full member, contrary to international pressure that wanted to isolate the country due to human rights violations, becoming a full member in 2014 with the very active support of Portuguese-speaking Africa, with the Portuguese language being restored as an official language.

== Geography and geology ==
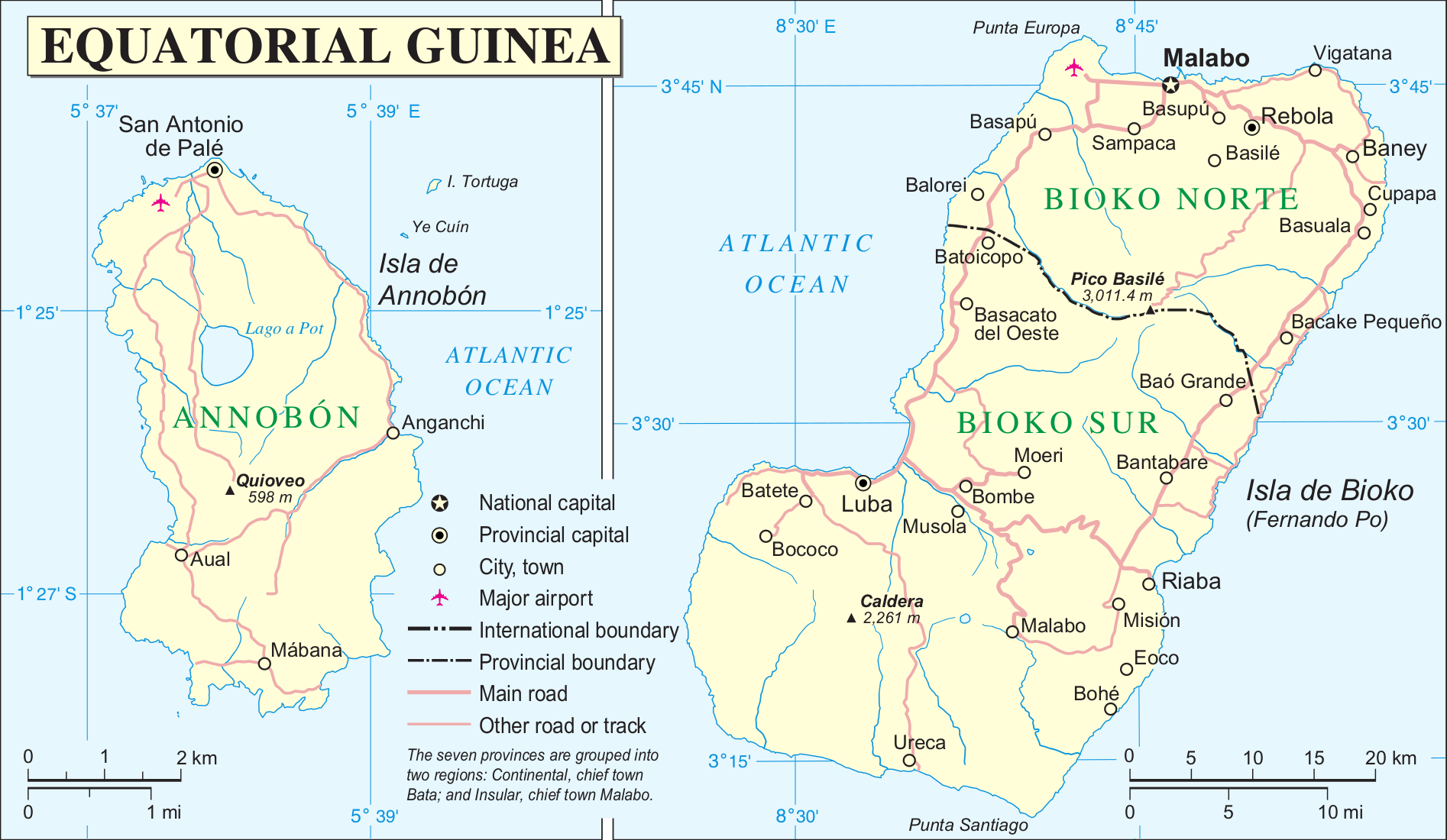
Detailed map of Annobón (left)

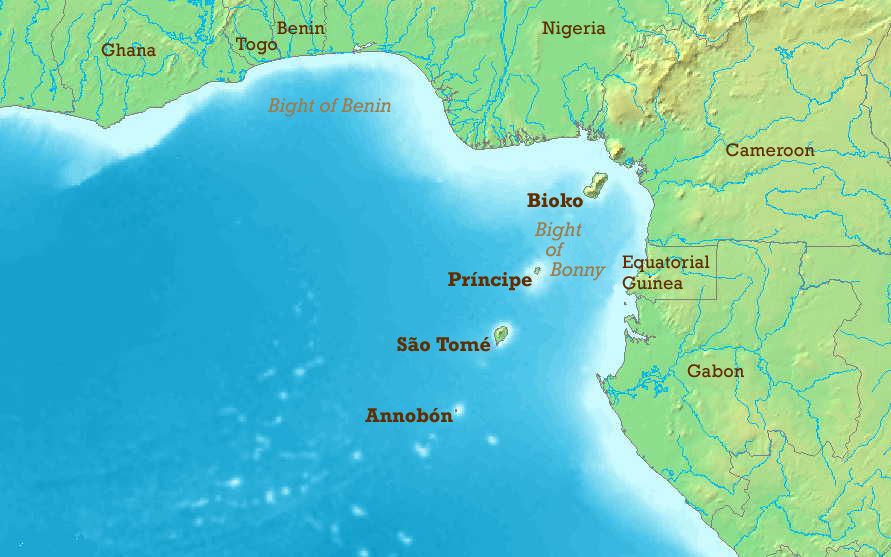
Location of Annobón in the Gulf of Guinea

Annobón is an extinct volcano, part of the Cameroon line, about 220 miles (350 km) west of Cape Lopez in Gabon and 110 miles (180 km) southwest of São Tomé Island. The main island measures about 4 miles (6.4 km) long by 2.02 miles (3.3 km) wide, with a total land area of 20.9 km^{2} (8.1 sq mi) (2,088 hectares), but a number of small rocky islets surround it, including Santarém to the south. Its central crater lake is named Lago A Pot and its highest peak is Quioveo, which rises 598 meters (1,962 ft). The island is characterized by a succession of lush valleys and steep mountains, covered with rich woods and luxuriant vegetation.

Annobón is often described as being "in the Gulf of Guinea", (Note: As, for example, by the Encyclopædia Britannica Eleventh Edition.) like the neighboring islands of São Tomé and Príncipe, but the formal boundary line for the Gulf of Guinea established by the International Hydrographic Organization actually runs north of it. (Note: From the 1953 Limits of Oceans and Seas: "(34) A line running south-eastwards from Cape Palmas in Liberia to Cape Lopez [in Gabon] (0°38' S, 8°42' E).")

== Flora and fauna ==
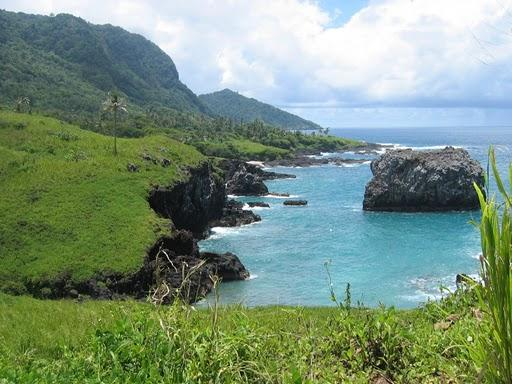
Annobón in 2011

Originally, this small equatorial island 335 km (208 mi) from the Gabonese coast was uninhabited and had great biological diversity. With colonisation, islanders used rafts or "cayucos" (canoe-like boats) to hunt humpback whales and their calves, and other cetaceans, with harpoons near to the island.

The Annobón white-eye and Annobón paradise flycatcher are endemic songbirds, as is the Sao Tome bronze-naped pigeon. There are also breeding black noddies. There are 29 species of bird (e.g. the Annobón scops owl) on the island, which has been designated an Important Bird Area (IBA) by BirdLife International.

There are also two bat species (one endemic); reptiles (five endemics): one snake, three geckos, two scincid lizards, three marine turtles; river fish: 18 species (one endemic); mosquitoes, scorpions, and huge centipedes. Introduced animals include fish, guinea fowl, rats, dogs, and cats. The island has no indigenous mammalian predators. Sharks are found in the surrounding sea.

There are 208 species of vascular plant (of which 15% are endemic) including the "point up" baobab, ceiba (used for cayuco construction), ficus, ferns and tree ferns, and great moss masses.

== Administration ==
A clickable map of Equatorial Guinea exhibiting its two regions and eight provinces. The island nation of São Tomé and Príncipe is not part of Equatorial Guinea.

The capital of the province is San Antonio de Palé (formerly St Antony). The island has three community councils (Consejos de Poblados): Anganchi, Aual, and Mabana.

== Demographics ==
The island had an estimated population of 3,000 through most of the 19th century. In 2013, Annobón had a population of 5,323 inhabitants.

=== Languages ===
The island's main language is a Portuguese creole known as Annobonese, Fa d'Ambu, or Falar de Ano Bom (Portuguese for 'Annobón speech'). The Portuguese creole has vigorous use in Annobón. It is common in all domains except government and education where Spanish is used. Spanish is not commonly spoken in Annobón. Non-creolized Portuguese is used as a liturgical language by local Catholics.

In February 2012, Equatorial Guinea's foreign minister signed an agreement with the International Portuguese Language Institute (IPLI) on the promotion of the Portuguese language in Equatorial Guinea. The adoption of Portuguese followed the announcement on 13 July 2007 by the President of Equatorial Guinea and a 2010 constitutional law which established Portuguese as an official language of the republic.

A sociolinguistic study by the IPLI in Annobón revealed strong connections with Portuguese creole-speaking communities in São Tomé and Príncipe, Cape Verde, and Guinea-Bissau.

=== Ethnicity ===
The island's inhabitants are of mixed Portuguese and Angolan descent, with some Spanish admixture. The early anti-Spanish sentiment, combined with the isolation from mainland Equatorial Guinea and the proximity of São Tomé and Príncipe—which is just 175 kilometers (109 mi) from the island—has helped preserve the island's cultural ties with Portugal. Its culture is very similar to that of São Tomé and the Afro-Portuguese peoples throughout Africa.

=== Religion ===
The population is Catholic, although with some form of syncretism, and religiosity remains a central feature of local lifestyle. Like Equatorial Guinea in general, Annobón has a majority of people who adhere to Christianity, especially Roman Catholics who are strongly influenced by the Portuguese culture. Places of worship on the island include a Roman Catholic mission, and an Assemblies of God church.

== Economy ==
Annobón is of strategic importance to Equatorial Guinea as through its ownership the Equatorial Guinean government claims extensive maritime territory to the south of its neighbour, São Tomé and Príncipe (which itself lies to the south of Equatorial Guinea's main land mass). Oil in the Gulf of Guinea represents more than 80% of Equatorial Guinea's economy, though supplies from current reserves were predicted by some sources to run out before 2020. Although no drilling is currently taking place in São Tomé, there are estimated to be 34 billion barrels (5.4×10^{9} m^{3}) of oil within its marine borders. Equatorial Guinea claims the right to explore for and produce hydrocarbons in a huge area of sea surrounding Annobón that stretches from 1°N to almost 5°S, and from 2°E to 7°E, an area larger than the entire land and sea borders of the rest of Equatorial Guinea.

The island has a 55-room hotel for tourists travelling in from mainland Equatorial Guinea.

== Infrastructure ==
The island has only one school, and essential services like electricity and clean drinking water are scarce or inconsistent. Most residents can only afford to leave the island by taking a weekly ferry or securing a berth on a ship that visits once or twice a month.

Annobón Airport and Annobón Port were opened at the northern tip of the island in 2010.

In 2015, a group of companies installed solar panels on the island to provide electricity to towns and the airport as part of the cross Equatorial Guinea development project 'Horizon 2020'. The electricity needs of the island are otherwise supplied by imported diesel fuelling diesel generators.

== Environment ==
Annobón has been used as a dumping ground for toxic waste, particularly in the 1980s and 1990s. In 1988, Teodoro Obiang Nguema Mbasogo, Equatorial Guinea's president, came to an agreement with a British company to host 10 million drums of toxic waste on Annobón. Der Spiegel reported on 28 August 2006 that Equatorial Guinea was being paid to bury nuclear waste there.

== Independence movement ==
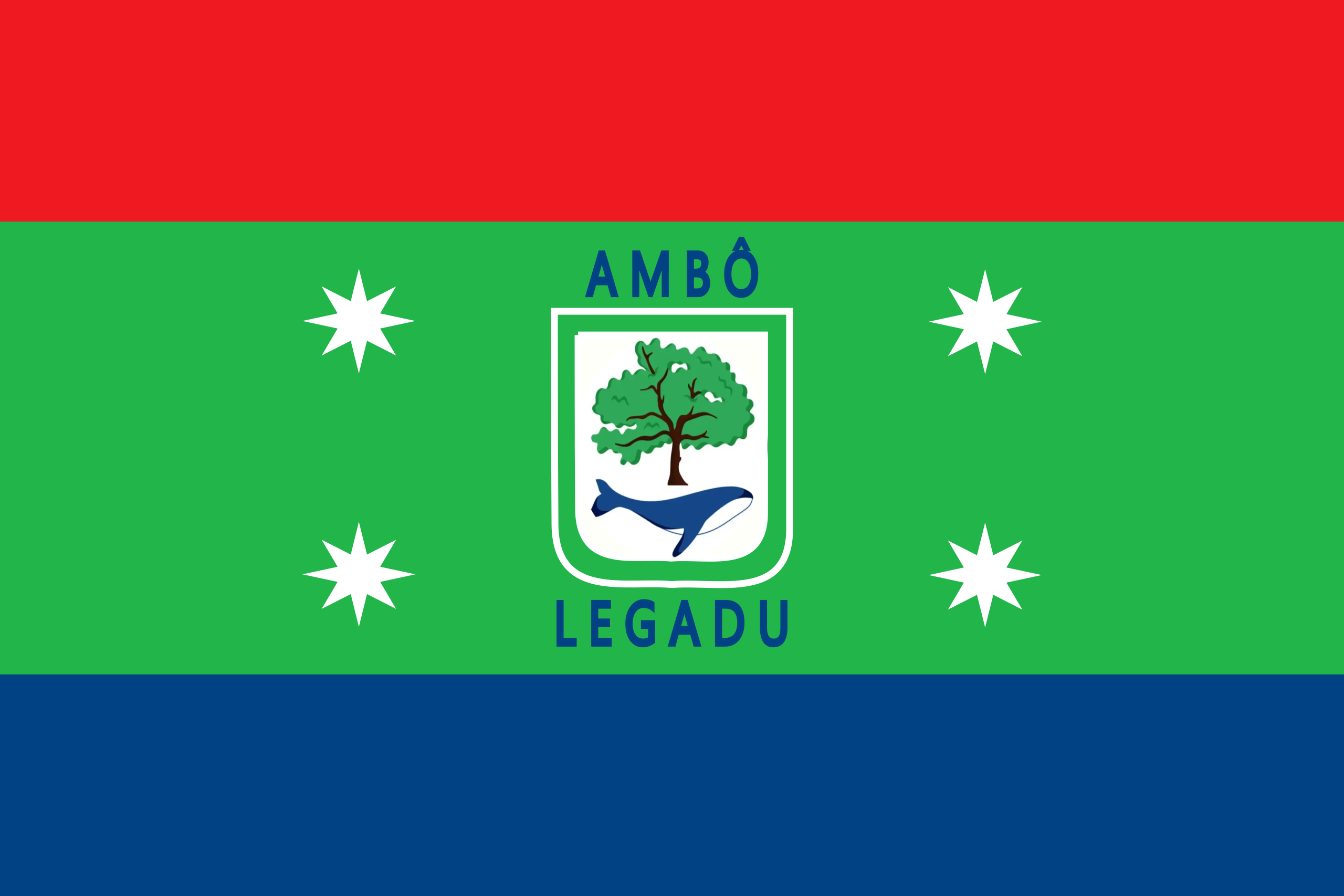
Flag of the self-proclaimed Republic of Annobón

The modern Annobonese separatist movement emerged with the establishment of Ambô Legadu in 2019 by Annobonese living in exile. The movement initially pursued greater political autonomy and internal self-determination for Annobón rather than immediate separation from Equatorial Guinea.

In 2021, the movement began a formal process seeking autonomy. On 1 April 2021, an Assembly General of the Annobonese People adopted Resolution 0001, requesting the exercise of internal self-determination and granting the government of Equatorial Guinea 90 days to respond to Annobonese aspirations for autonomy. According to the movement, the government did not respond. A second General Assembly held on 1 July 2021 adopted Resolution 0002, granting the government an additional 30 days and ordering the preparation of a legal report examining a possible unilateral declaration of independence.

After no response was received, a third General Assembly on 7 August 2021 granted a further seven-day deadline, while also resolving to establish a constitutional committee and begin preparations for a national government. A fourth assembly subsequently approved a demonstration held on 12 October 2021 that again demanded autonomy, and on 14 November a fifth General Assembly considered the conclusions of the legal report on a possible unilateral declaration of independence. On 15 December 2021, Resolution 005 set out the transition from demands for internal self-determination towards separation from Equatorial Guinea and the establishment of an independent Annobonese state.

On 8 July 2022, following the unsuccessful requests for autonomy, the movement unilaterally declared the independence of Annobón and proclaimed the Republic of Annobón. The self-proclaimed government is headed by President Pa Nando Palas Bahê, with Orlando Cartagena Lagar serving as Prime Minister and head of government. On 14 May 2024, the self-proclaimed Republic of Annobón was admitted as a member of the Unrepresented Nations and Peoples Organization (UNPO).

Following a peaceful petition by local islanders in July 2024 requesting an end to environmental destruction associated with the use of dynamite for mineral extraction projects, Equatorial Guinean authorities imposed an internet and telecommunications shutdown and arrested dozens of people in Annobón, Malabo, and Bata. Forty-two Annobonese were arrested between July and August 2024; five women were subsequently released, while 37 remained in detention.

In response to the arrests and wider allegations of human rights violations, representatives of the self-proclaimed Republic of Annobón, together with UNPO and Spanish human rights lawyer Aitor Martínez Jiménez, brought the situation before United Nations human rights mechanisms. A submission concerning the 37 remaining detainees was made to the United Nations Working Group on Arbitrary Detention (WGAD), while information concerning the broader human rights and environmental situation on the island was submitted to the UN Special Procedures.

In Opinion No. 13/2025, adopted in April 2025 and subsequently published in June, the United Nations Working Group on Arbitrary Detention concluded that the detention of the 37 Annobonese was arbitrary under Categories I, II, III and V of its methods of work. The Working Group found that the detentions lacked a sufficient legal basis; resulted from the exercise of rights protected under international law, including freedom of opinion, expression, peaceful assembly, association and political participation; and involved violations of the detainees' right to a fair trial. Under Category V, the Working Group further concluded that the deprivation of liberty was discriminatory, based on the detainees' ethnic origin, language and political opinion. It requested that Equatorial Guinea immediately release the 37 detainees, provide compensation and other reparations, conduct an independent investigation into the circumstances of their detention, and take measures against those responsible. The 37 detainees were subsequently released in June 2025.

On 28 August 2025, nine United Nations human rights mandates issued a joint allegation letter to the Government of Equatorial Guinea concerning the environmental crisis and alleged human rights violations in Annobón associated with the activities of the Moroccan construction company SOMAGEC. The communication was issued by the mandates concerning the right to a clean, healthy and sustainable environment; arbitrary detention; business and human rights; freedom of peaceful assembly and association; adequate housing; human rights defenders; minority issues; hazardous substances and wastes; and the human rights to safe drinking water and sanitation.

The UN experts described the Annobonese as a distinct ethnic minority within Equatorial Guinea and raised concerns regarding environmental degradation, access to drinking water, damage to housing and livelihoods, restrictions on freedom of expression, peaceful assembly and association, and the detention and intimidation of residents following protests against the use of explosives for mineral extraction. The communication further expressed concern that the alleged violations were aggravating what the experts described as the historical, systemic and generalized political exclusion of the population of Annobón, including its limited representation in national decision-making institutions. The experts requested information from the Equatorial Guinean government concerning measures taken to protect the population's human rights, investigate the alleged violations, address environmental damage, ensure access to essential services and prevent reprisals against residents and human rights defenders.

In May 2025, representatives of the self-proclaimed Republic of Annobón sought support from Argentina, proposing a relationship under which Annobón could become an associated state or potentially a province, citing the island's historical administrative connection to Buenos Aires through the Viceroyalty of the Río de la Plata.

== See also ==
- Provinces of Equatorial Guinea

== Sources ==
- Baynes, T. S., ed. (1878). "Anno Bom" . Encyclopædia Britannica. Vol. 2 (9th ed.). New York: Charles Scribner's Sons. p. 72.
- Chisholm, Hugh, ed. (1911). "Annobon" . Encyclopædia Britannica. Vol. 2 (11th ed.). Cambridge University Press. p. 74.
