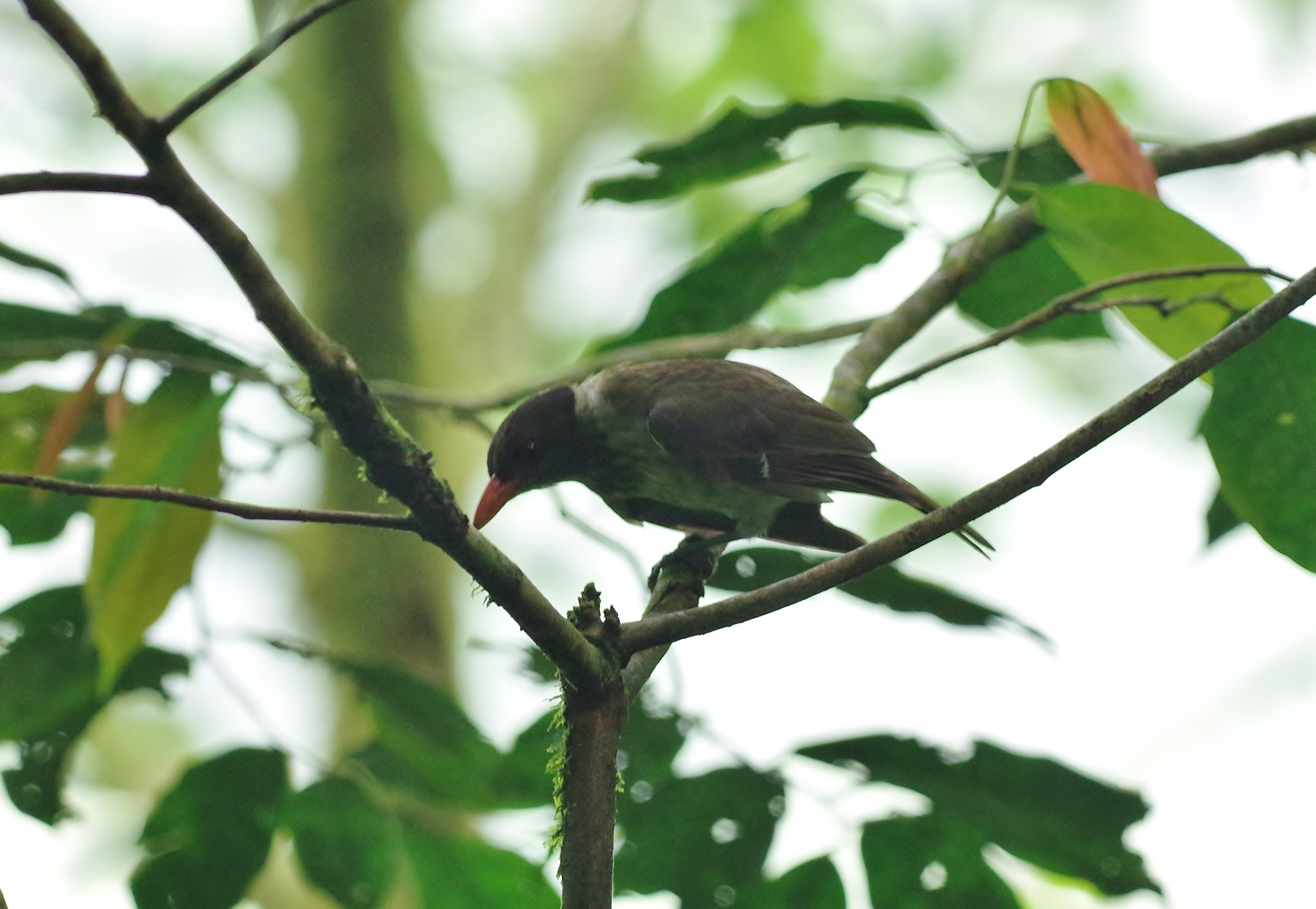
- Male
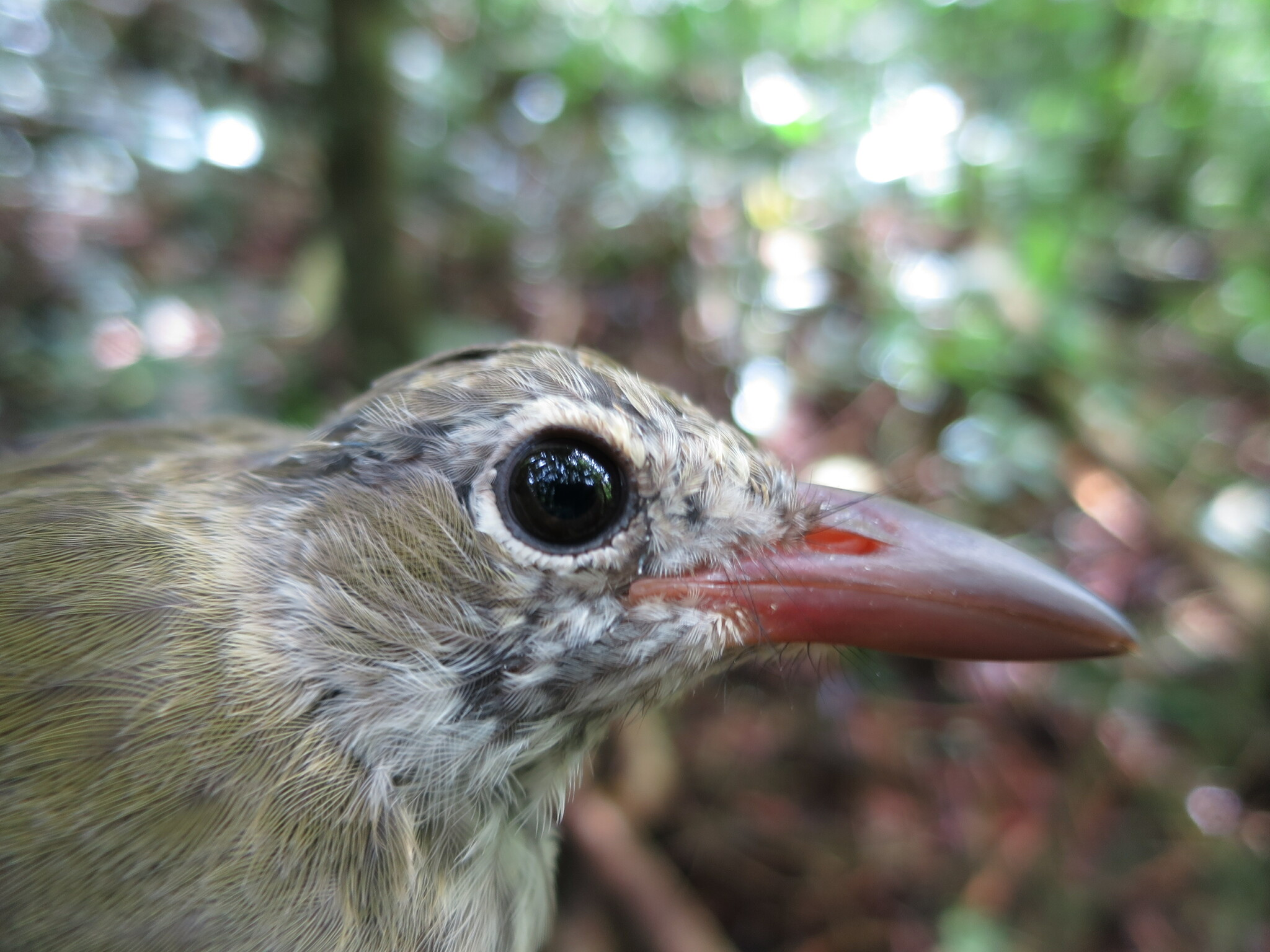
- Female

Conservation status
- Vulnerable (IUCN 3.1)

Scientific classification
- Kingdom: Animalia
- Phylum: Chordata
- Class: Aves
- Order: Passeriformes
- Family: Oriolidae
- Genus: Oriolus
- Species: O. crassirostris

Binomial name
- Oriolus crassirostris Hartlaub, 1857
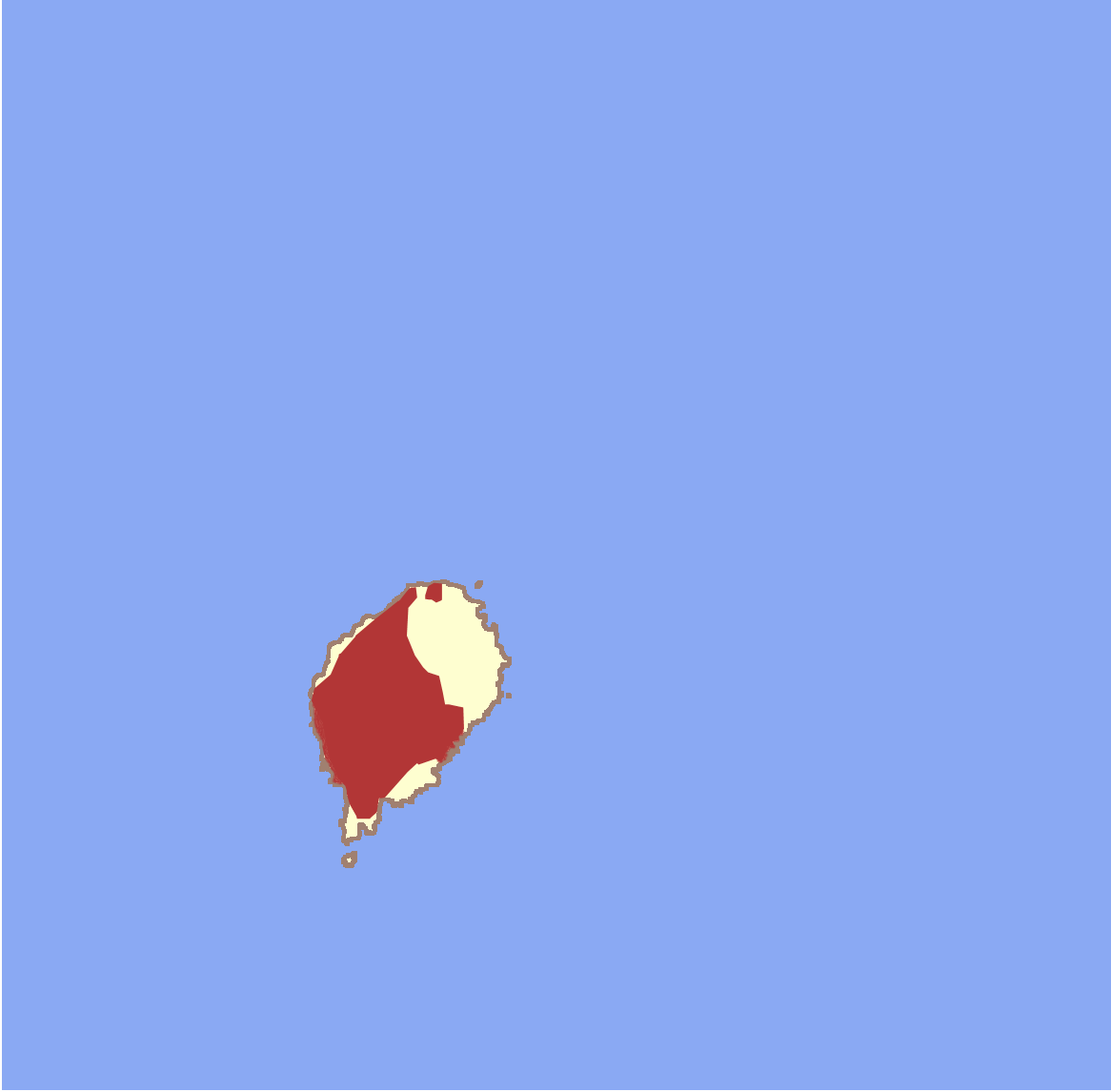
- Distribution on the island of São Tomé

= São Tomé oriole =

Species of bird

The São Tomé oriole (Oriolus crassirostris), or great-billed oriole, is a species of bird in the family Oriolidae. The species was named by Gustav Hartlaub in 1857. It is endemic to the island of São Tomé. Its natural habitats are subtropical or tropical moist lowland forests and subtropical or tropical moist montane forests. It is threatened by habitat loss.

== Distribution and habitat ==
It is widely distributed throughout the island of São Tomé, except the northeast (the urban area of São Tomé). It is most abundant in the southwest and on the central massif.

== Threats ==
The São Tomé oriole is threatened by habitat loss of the remaining lowland rainforest of São Tomé.
