= List of birds of São Tomé and Príncipe =

This is a list of the bird species recorded in São Tomé and Príncipe. As São Tomé and Príncipe is a series of islands, its avifauna grows whenever a "new" species arrives or is recorded for the first time; the list comprises 176 species, of which 25 are endemic, 4 have been introduced by humans, and several are rare or accidental (often termed "vagrants").

This list's taxonomic treatment (designation and sequence of orders, families and species) and nomenclature (common and scientific names) for the most part follow the conventions of The Clements Checklist of Birds of the World, 2022 edition. The family accounts at the beginning of each heading reflect this taxonomy, as do the species counts found in each family account. Introduced and accidental species are included in the total counts for São Tomé and Príncipe.

The following tags have been used to highlight several categories, but not all species fall into one of these categories. Those that do not are commonly occurring native species.

- (A) Accidental - a species that rarely or accidentally occurs in São Tomé and Príncipe
- (E) Endemic - a species endemic to São Tomé and Príncipe
- (I) Introduced - a species introduced to São Tomé and Príncipe as a consequence, direct or indirect, of human actions

== Ducks, geese, and waterfowl ==
Order: Anseriformes Family: Anatidae

Anatidae includes the ducks and most duck-like waterfowl, such as geese and swans. These birds are adapted to an aquatic existence with webbed feet, flattened bills, and feathers that are excellent at shedding water due to an oily coating.

- Fulvous whistling-duck, Dendrocygna bicolor
- Knob-billed duck, Sarkidiornis melanotos
- African pygmy-goose, Nettapus auritus (A)

== Guineafowl ==
Order: Galliformes Family: Numididae

Guineafowl are a group of African, seed-eating, ground-nesting birds that resemble partridges, but with featherless heads and spangled grey plumage.

- Helmeted guineafowl, Numida meleagris

== Pheasants, grouse, and allies ==
Order: Galliformes Family: Phasianidae

The Phasianidae are a family of terrestrial birds which consists of quails, partridges, snowcocks, francolins, spurfowls, tragopans, monals, pheasants, peafowls and jungle fowls. In general, they are plump (although they vary in size) and have broad, relatively short wings.

- Harlequin quail, Coturnix delegorguei
- Scaly francolin, Pternistis squamatus
- Red-necked spurfowl, Pternistis afer

== Flamingos ==
Order: Phoenicopteriformes Family: Phoenicopteridae

Flamingos are gregarious wading birds, usually 3 to 5 feet (0.9 to 1.5 m) tall, found in both the Western and Eastern Hemispheres. Flamingos filter-feed on shellfish and algae. Their oddly-shaped beaks are specially adapted to separate mud and silt from the food they consume and, uniquely, are used upside-down. There are 6 species worldwide and 1 or 2 species which occur in São Tomé and Príncipe.

- Greater flamingo, Phoenicopterus roseus
- Lesser flamingo, Phoenicopterus minor

== Pigeons and doves ==
Order: Columbiformes Family: Columbidae

Pigeons and doves are stout-bodied birds with short necks and short slender bills with a fleshy cere.

- Rock pigeon, Columba livia
- Rameron pigeon, Columba arquatrix
- Maroon pigeon, Columba thomensis (E)
- São Tomé pigeon, Columba malherbii
- Lemon dove, Columba larvata
- Laughing dove, Streptopelia senegalensis
- São Tomé green-pigeon, Treron sanctithomae (E)
- African green-pigeon, Treron calva

== Cuckoos ==
Order: Cuculiformes Family: Cuculidae

The family Cuculidae includes cuckoos, roadrunners and anis. These birds are of variable size with slender bodies, long tails and strong legs. The Old World cuckoos are brood parasites.

- Great spotted cuckoo, Clamator glandarius
- Pied cuckoo, Clamator jacobinus
- Klaas's cuckoo, Chrysococcyx klaas
- African emerald cuckoo, Chrysococcyx cupreus
- Common cuckoo, Cuculus canorus

== Swifts ==
Order: Caprimulgiformes Family: Apodidae

Swifts are small birds which spend the majority of their lives flying. These birds have very short legs and never settle voluntarily on the ground, perching instead only on vertical surfaces. Many swifts have long swept-back wings which resemble a crescent or boomerang.

- São Tomé spinetail, Zoonavena thomensis (E)
- Common swift, Apus apus (A)
- Pallid swift, Apus pallidus (A)
- Little swift, Apus affinis
- African palm-swift, Cypsiurus parvus

== Rails, gallinules, and coots ==
Order: Gruiformes Family: Rallidae

Rallidae is a large family of small to medium-sized birds which includes the rails, crakes, coots and gallinules. Typically they inhabit dense vegetation in damp environments near lakes, swamps or rivers. In general they are shy and secretive birds, making them difficult to observe. Most species have strong legs and long toes which are well adapted to soft uneven surfaces. They tend to have short, rounded wings and to be weak fliers.

- African rail, Rallus caerulescens
- African crake, Crex egregia
- Lesser moorhen, Paragallinula angulata
- Eurasian moorhen, Gallinula chloropus
- Allen's gallinule, Porphyrio alleni (A)

== Thick-knees ==
Order: Charadriiformes Family: Burhinidae

The thick-knees are a group of largely tropical waders in the family Burhinidae. They are found worldwide within the tropical zone, with some species also breeding in temperate Europe and Australia. They are medium to large waders with strong black or yellow-black bills, large yellow eyes and cryptic plumage. Despite being classed as waders, most species have a preference for arid or semi-arid habitats.

- Eurasian thick-knee, Burhinus oedicnemus (A)

== Plovers and lapwings ==
Order: Charadriiformes Family: Charadriidae

The family Charadriidae includes the plovers, dotterels and lapwings. They are small to medium-sized birds with compact bodies, short, thick necks and long, usually pointed, wings. They are found in open country worldwide, mostly in habitats near water.

- Black-bellied plover, Pluvialis squatarola
- European golden-plover, Pluvialis apricaria
- American golden-plover, Pluvialis dominica
- Spur-winged lapwing, Vanellus spinosus (A)
- Common ringed plover, Charadrius hiaticula (A)
- Little ringed plover, Charadrius dubius
- White-fronted plover, Charadrius marginatus

== Sandpipers and allies ==
Order: Charadriiformes Family: Scolopacidae

Scolopacidae is a large diverse family of small to medium-sized shorebirds including the sandpipers, curlews, godwits, shanks, tattlers, woodcocks, snipes, dowitchers and phalaropes. The majority of these species eat small invertebrates picked out of the mud or soil. Variation in length of legs and bills enables multiple species to feed in the same habitat, particularly on the coast, without direct competition for food.

- Whimbrel, Numenius phaeopus
- Eurasian curlew, Numenius arquata
- Bar-tailed godwit, Limosa lapponica
- Ruddy turnstone, Arenaria interpres
- Red knot, Calidris canutus (A)
- Ruff, Calidris pugnax (A)
- Curlew sandpiper, Calidris ferruginea
- Sanderling, Calidris alba (A)
- Little stint, Calidris minuta
- Pectoral sandpiper, Calidris melanotos
- Common sandpiper, Actitis hypoleucos
- Green sandpiper, Tringa ochropus
- Common greenshank, Tringa nebularia
- Marsh sandpiper, Tringa stagnatilis
- Wood sandpiper, Tringa glareola

== Pratincoles and coursers ==
Order: Charadriiformes Family: Glareolidae

Glareolidae is a family of wading birds comprising the pratincoles, which have short legs, long pointed wings and long forked tails, and the coursers, which have long legs, short wings and long pointed bills which curve downwards.

- Black-winged pratincole, Glareola nordmanni

== Skuas and jaegers ==
Order: Charadriiformes Family: Stercorariidae

The family Stercorariidae are, in general, medium to large birds, typically with grey or brown plumage, often with white markings on the wings. They nest on the ground in temperate and arctic regions and are long-distance migrants.

- Pomarine jaeger, Stercorarius pomarinus
- Parasitic jaeger, Stercorarius parasiticus (A)

== Gulls, terns, and skimmers ==
Order: Charadriiformes Family: Laridae

Laridae is a family of medium to large seabirds, the gulls, terns, and skimmers. Gulls are typically grey or white, often with black markings on the head or wings. They have stout, longish bills and webbed feet. Terns are a group of generally medium to large seabirds typically with grey or white plumage, often with black markings on the head. Most terns hunt fish by diving but some pick insects off the surface of fresh water. Terns are generally long-lived birds, with several species known to live in excess of 30 years.

- Sabine's gull, Xema sabini (A)
- Brown noddy, Anous stolidus
- Black noddy, Anous minutus
- Sooty tern, Onychoprion fuscatus
- Bridled tern, Onychoprion anaethetus
- Black tern, Chlidonias niger (A)
- White-winged tern, Chlidonias leucopterus
- Arctic tern, Sterna paradisaea (A)
- Sandwich tern, Thalasseus sandvicensis
- West African crested tern, Thalasseus albididorsalis (A)

== Tropicbirds ==
Order: Phaethontiformes Family: Phaethontidae

Tropicbirds are slender white birds of tropical oceans, with exceptionally long central tail feathers. Their heads and long wings have black markings.

- White-tailed tropicbird, Phaethon lepturus
- Red-billed tropicbird, Phaethon aethereus (A)

== Southern storm-petrels ==
Order: Procellariiformes Family: Oceanitidae

The southern storm-petrels are relatives of the petrels and are the smallest seabirds. They feed on planktonic crustaceans and small fish picked from the surface, typically while hovering. The flight is fluttering and sometimes bat-like.

- Wilson's storm-petrel, Oceanites oceanicus

== Northern storm-petrels ==
Order: Procellariiformes Family: Hydrobatidae

Though the members of this family are similar in many respects to the southern storm-petrels, including their general appearance and habits, there are enough genetic differences to warrant their placement in a separate family.

- European storm-petrel, Hydrobates pelagicus
- Band-rumped storm-petrel, Hydrobates castro

== Shearwaters and petrels ==
Order: Procellariiformes Family: Procellariidae

The procellariids are the main group of medium-sized "true petrels", characterised by united nostrils with medium septum and a long outer functional primary.

- Cory's shearwater, Calonectris diomedea (A)
- Great shearwater, Ardenna gravis
- Sooty shearwater, Ardenna griseus

== Storks ==
Order: Ciconiiformes Family: Ciconiidae

Storks are large, long-legged, long-necked, wading birds with long, stout bills. Storks are mute, but bill-clattering is an important mode of communication at the nest. Their nests can be large and may be reused for many years. Many species are migratory.

- White stork, Ciconia ciconia
- Yellow-billed stork, Mycteria ibis (A)

== Frigatebirds ==
Order: Suliformes Family: Fregatidae

Frigatebirds are large seabirds usually found over tropical oceans. They are large, black-and-white, or completely black, with long wings and deeply forked tails. The males have colored inflatable throat pouches. They do not swim or walk and cannot take off from a flat surface. Having the largest wingspan-to-body-weight ratio of any bird, they are essentially aerial, able to stay aloft for more than a week.

- Magnificent frigatebird, Fregata magnificens (A)

== Boobies and gannets ==
Order: Suliformes Family: Sulidae

The sulids comprise the gannets and boobies. Both groups are medium to large coastal seabirds that plunge-dive for fish.

- Masked booby, Sula dactylatra
- Brown booby, Sula leucogaster
- Red-footed booby, Sula sula (A)
- Cape gannet, Morus capensis

== Cormorants and shags ==
Order: Suliformes Family: Phalacrocoracidae

Phalacrocoracidae is a family of medium to large coastal, fish-eating seabirds that includes cormorants and shags. Plumage colouration varies, with the majority having mainly dark plumage, some species being black-and-white and a few being colourful.

- Long-tailed cormorant, Microcarbo africanus

== Herons, egrets, and bitterns ==
Order: Pelecaniformes Family: Ardeidae

The family Ardeidae contains the bitterns, herons and egrets. Herons and egrets are medium to large wading birds with long necks and legs. Bitterns tend to be shorter necked and more wary. Members of Ardeidae fly with their necks retracted, unlike other long-necked birds such as storks, ibises and spoonbills.

- Little bittern, Ixobrychus minutus
- Gray heron, Ardea cinerea
- Black-headed heron, Ardea melanocephala (A)
- Purple heron, Ardea purpurea
- Great egret, Ardea alba (A)
- Intermediate egret, Ardea intermedia (A)
- Little egret, Egretta garzetta
- Western reef-heron, Egretta gularis
- Black heron, Egretta ardesiaca
- Cattle egret, Bubulcus ibis
- Squacco heron, Ardeola ralloides (A)
- Striated heron, Butorides striata

== Ibises and spoonbills ==
Order: Pelecaniformes Family: Threskiornithidae

Threskiornithidae is a family of large terrestrial and wading birds which includes the ibises and spoonbills. They have long, broad wings with 11 primary and about 20 secondary feathers. They are strong fliers and despite their size and weight, very capable soarers.

- Olive ibis, Bostrychia olivacea
- São Tomé ibis, Bostrychia bocagei (E)

== Osprey ==
Order: Accipitriformes Family: Pandionidae

The family Pandionidae contains only one species, the osprey. The osprey is a medium-large raptor which is a specialist fish-eater with a worldwide distribution.

- Osprey, Pandion haliaetus

== Hawks, eagles, and kites ==
Order: Accipitriformes Family: Accipitridae

Accipitridae is a family of birds of prey, which includes hawks, eagles, kites, harriers and Old World vultures. These birds have powerful hooked beaks for tearing flesh from their prey, strong legs, powerful talons and keen eyesight.

- Palm-nut vulture, Gypohierax angolensis
- White-backed vulture, Gyps africanus (A)
- Black kite, Milvus migrans

== Barn-owls ==
Order: Strigiformes Family: Tytonidae

Barn-owls are medium to large owls with large heads and characteristic heart-shaped faces. They have long strong legs with powerful talons.

- Western barn owl, Tyto alba

== Owls ==
Order: Strigiformes Family: Strigidae

The typical owls are small to large solitary nocturnal birds of prey. They have large forward-facing eyes and ears, a hawk-like beak and a conspicuous circle of feathers around each eye called a facial disk.

- São Tomé scops-owl, Otus hartlaubi (E)
- African scops-owl, Otus senegalensis
- Principe scops owl, Otus bikegila (CR)

== Kingfishers ==
Order: Coraciiformes Family: Alcedinidae

Kingfishers are medium-sized birds with large heads, long pointed bills, short legs and stubby tails.

- Malachite kingfisher, Corythornis cristatus
  - Príncipe kingfisher, Corythornis cristatus nais (E)
  - São Tomé kingfisher, Corythornis cristatus thomensis (E)
- White-bellied kingfisher, Corythornis leucogaster
- Blue-breasted kingfisher, Halcyon malimbica
- Pied kingfisher, Ceryle rudis

== Rollers ==
Order: Coraciiformes Family: Coraciidae

Rollers resemble crows in size and build, but are more closely related to the kingfishers and bee-eaters. They share the colourful appearance of those groups with blues and browns predominating. The two inner front toes are connected, but the outer toe is not.

- European roller, Coracias garrulus
- Broad-billed roller, Eurystomus glaucurus (A)

== Falcons and caracaras ==
Order: Falconiformes Family: Falconidae

Falconidae is a family of diurnal birds of prey. They differ from hawks, eagles and kites in that they kill with their beaks instead of their talons.

- Red-footed falcon, Falco vespertinus
- Eurasian hobby, Falco subbuteo (A)
- Lanner falcon, Falco biarmicus (A)

== Old World parrots ==
Order: Psittaciformes Family: Psittaculidae

Characteristic features of parrots include a strong curved bill, an upright stance, strong legs, and clawed zygodactyl feet. Many parrots are vividly colored, and some are multi-colored. In size they range from 8 cm (3.1 in) to 1 m (3.3 ft) in length. Old World parrots are found from Africa east across south and southeast Asia and Oceania to Australia and New Zealand.

- Red-headed lovebird, Agapornis pullarius

== New World and African parrots ==
Order: Psittaciformes Family: Psittacidae

Most of the more than 150 species in this family are found in the New World.

- Gray parrot, Psittacus erithacus

== Old World orioles ==
Order: Passeriformes Family: Oriolidae

The Old World orioles are colourful passerine birds. They are not related to the New World orioles.

- Eurasian golden oriole, Oriolus oriolus (A)
- São Tomé oriole, Oriolus crassirostris (E)

== Drongos ==
Order: Passeriformes Family: Dicruridae

The drongos are mostly black or dark grey in colour, sometimes with metallic tints. They have long forked tails, and some Asian species have elaborate tail decorations. They have short legs and sit very upright when perched, like a shrike. They flycatch or take prey from the ground.

- Velvet-mantled drongo, Dicrurus modestus

== Monarch flycatchers ==
Order: Passeriformes Family: Monarchidae

The monarch flycatchers are small to medium-sized insectivorous passerines which hunt by flycatching.

- São Tomé paradise-flycatcher, Terpsiphone atrochalybeia (E)
- Black-headed paradise-flycatcher, Terpsiphone rufiventer

== Shrikes ==
Order: Passeriformes Family: Laniidae

Shrikes are passerine birds known for their habit of catching other birds and small animals and impaling the uneaten portions of their bodies on thorns. A typical shrike's beak is hooked, like a bird of prey.

- Lesser gray shrike, Lanius minor
- Newton's fiscal, Lanius newtoni (E)

== Cisticolas and allies ==
Order: Passeriformes Family: Cisticolidae

The Cisticolidae are warblers found mainly in warmer southern regions of the Old World. They are generally very small birds of drab brown or grey appearance found in open country such as grassland or scrub.

- São Tomé prinia, Prinia molleri (E)

== Reed warblers and allies ==
Order: Passeriformes Family: Acrocephalidae

The members of this family are usually rather large for "warblers". Most are rather plain olivaceous brown above with much yellow to beige below. They are usually found in open woodland, reedbeds, or tall grass. The family occurs mostly in southern to western Eurasia and surroundings, but it also ranges far into the Pacific, with some species in Africa.

- Great reed warbler, Acrocephalus arundinaceus (A)

== Swallows ==
Order: Passeriformes Family: Hirundinidae

The family Hirundinidae is adapted to aerial feeding. They have a slender streamlined body, long pointed wings and a short bill with a wide gape. The feet are adapted to perching rather than walking, and the front toes are partially joined at the base.

- Bank swallow, Riparia riparia (A)
- Banded martin, Neophedina cincta
- Barn swallow, Hirundo rustica
- Common house-martin, Delichon urbicum
- Gray-rumped swallow, Pseudhirundo griseopyga (A)

== Leaf warblers ==
Order: Passeriformes Family: Phylloscopidae

Leaf warblers are a family of small insectivorous birds found mostly in Eurasia and ranging into Wallacea and Africa. The species are of various sizes, often green-plumaged above and yellow below, or more subdued with grayish-green to grayish-brown colors.

- Willow warbler, Phylloscopus trochilus (A)

== Sylviid warblers, parrotbills, and allies ==
Order: Passeriformes Family: Sylviidae

The family Sylviidae is a group of small insectivorous passerine birds. They mainly occur as breeding species, as the common name implies, in Europe, Asia and, to a lesser extent, Africa. Most are of generally undistinguished appearance, but many have distinctive songs.

- Garden warbler, Sylvia borin (A)
- Dohrn's thrush-babbler, Sylvia dohrni

== White-eyes, yuhinas, and allies ==
Order: Passeriformes Family: Zosteropidae

The white-eyes are small and mostly undistinguished, their plumage above being generally some dull colour like greenish-olive, but some species have a white or bright yellow throat, breast or lower parts, and several have buff flanks. As their name suggests, many species have a white ring around each eye.

- Principe white-eye, Zosterops ficedulinus (E)
- São Tomé white-eye, Zosterops feae (E)
- Black-capped speirops, Zosterops lugubris (E)
- Príncipe speirops, Zosterops leucophaeus (E)

== Starlings ==
Order: Passeriformes Family: Sturnidae

Starlings are small to medium-sized passerine birds. Their flight is strong and direct and they are very gregarious. Their preferred habitat is fairly open country. They eat insects and fruit. Plumage is typically dark with a metallic sheen.

- Chestnut-winged starling, Onychognathus fulgidus
- Splendid starling, Lamprotornis splendidus
- Principe starling, Lamprotornis ornatus (E)

== Thrushes and allies ==
Order: Passeriformes Family: Turdidae

The thrushes are a group of passerine birds that occur mainly in the Old World. They are plump, soft plumaged, small to medium-sized insectivores or sometimes omnivores, often feeding on the ground. Many have attractive songs.

- Príncipe thrush, Turdus xanthorhynchus (E)
- São Tomé thrush, Turdus olivaceofuscus (E)

== Old World flycatchers ==
Order: Passeriformes Family: Muscicapidae

Old World flycatchers are a large group of small passerine birds native to the Old World. They are mainly small arboreal insectivores. The appearance of these birds is highly varied, but they mostly have weak songs and harsh calls.

- Spotted flycatcher, Muscicapa striata
- Common nightingale, Luscinia megarhynchos (A)
- Collared flycatcher, Ficedula albicollis (A)
- Whinchat, Saxicola rubetra (A)

== Sunbirds and spiderhunters ==
Order: Passeriformes Family: Nectariniidae

The sunbirds and spiderhunters are very small passerine birds which feed largely on nectar, although they will also take insects, especially when feeding young. Flight is fast and direct on their short wings. Most species can take nectar by hovering like a hummingbird, but usually perch to feed.

- Príncipe sunbird, Anabathmis hartlaubii (E)
- Newton's sunbird, Anabathmis newtonii (E)
- São Tomé sunbird, Dreptes thomensis (E)
- Olive sunbird, Cyanomitra olivacea

== Weavers and allies ==
Order: Passeriformes Family: Ploceidae

The weavers are small passerine birds related to the finches. They are seed-eating birds with rounded conical bills. The males of many species are brightly coloured, usually in red or yellow and black, some species show variation in colour only in the breeding season.

- Príncipe golden-weaver, Ploceus princeps (E)
- Southern masked-weaver, Ploceus velatus
- Village weaver, Ploceus cucullatus (I)
- Giant weaver, Ploceus grandis (E)
- Black-headed weaver, Ploceus melanocephalus
- São Tomé weaver, Ploceus sanctithomae (E)
- Red-headed quelea, Quelea erythrops
- Black-winged bishop, Euplectes hordeaceus
- Golden-backed bishop, Euplectes aureus
- White-winged widowbird, Euplectes albonotatus

== Waxbills and allies ==
Order: Passeriformes Family: Estrildidae

The estrildid finches are small passerine birds of the Old World tropics and Australasia. They are gregarious and often colonial seed eaters with short thick but pointed bills. They are all similar in structure and habits, but have wide variation in plumage colours and patterns.

- Bronze mannikin, Spermestes cucullatus
- Chestnut-breasted nigrita, Nigrita bicolor
- Common waxbill, Estrilda astrild (I)
- Southern cordonbleu, Uraeginthus angolensis (I)

== Indigobirds ==
Order: Passeriformes Family: Viduidae

The indigobirds are finch-like species which usually have black or indigo predominating in their plumage. All are brood parasites, which lay their eggs in the nests of estrildid finches.

- Pin-tailed whydah, Vidua macroura
- Eastern paradise-whydah, Vidua paradisaea (I)

== Old World sparrows ==
Order: Passeriformes Family: Passeridae

Old World sparrows are small passerine birds. In general, sparrows tend to be small, plump, brown or grey birds with short tails and short powerful beaks. Old World sparrow are seed eaters, but they also consume small insects.

- House sparrow, Passer domesticus (A)

== Wagtails and pipits ==
Order: Passeriformes Family: Motacillidae

Motacillidae is a family of small passerine birds with medium to long tails. They include the wagtails, longclaws and pipits. They are slender, ground feeding insectivores of open country.

- São Tomé short-tail, Motacilla bocagii (E)
- Western yellow wagtail, Motacilla flava (A)
- African pied wagtail, Motacilla aguimp
- White wagtail, Motacilla alba (A)
- Plain-backed pipit, Anthus leucophrys (A)
- Tree pipit, Anthus trivialis (A)

== Finches, euphonias, and allies ==
Order: Passeriformes Family: Fringillidae

Finches are seed-eating passerine birds, that are small to moderately large and have a strong beak, usually conical and in some species very large. All have twelve tail feathers and nine primaries. These birds have a bouncing flight with alternating bouts of flapping and gliding on closed wings, and most sing well.

- Yellow-fronted canary, Crithagra mozambica
- Príncipe seedeater, Crithagra rufobrunnea (E)
- São Tomé grosbeak, Crithagra concolor (E)

== See also ==
- List of birds
- Lists of birds by region
