= Parque Natural Obô do Príncipe =

National park in São Tomé and Príncipe

- Interactive map of Parque Natural Obô do Príncipe
- Coordinates: 1.58°N 7.38°E
- Area: 85 km^{2} (33 sq mi)
- Created: 2006

The Obô Natural Park of Príncipe (Portuguese: Parque Natural Obô do Príncipe) is a natural park of São Tomé and Príncipe, covering 85 km^{2} of the island of Príncipe. It was established in 2006.

== Flora and fauna ==
On Príncipe island, fauna includes a frog known as Phrynobatrachus dispar, birds such as Dohrn's thrush-babbler (Horizorhinus dohrni), the Príncipe kingfisher, Principe starling and the Príncipe thrush (Turdus xanthorhynchus), and the grey parrot (Psittacus erithacus), and a moth such as Agrotera albalis.
