= Pterolophia ferrugineotincta =

Scientific classification
- Domain: Eukaryota
- Kingdom: Animalia
- Phylum: Arthropoda
- Class: Insecta
- Order: Coleoptera
- Suborder: Polyphaga
- Infraorder: Cucujiformia
- Family: Cerambycidae
- Tribe: Pteropliini
- Genus: Pterolophia
- Species: P. ferrugineotincta

Binomial name
- Pterolophia ferrugineotincta Aurivillius, 1926

Species of beetle

Pterolophia ferrugineotincta is a species of beetle in the family Cerambycidae. It was described by Per Olof Christopher Aurivillius in 1926. It is known from Príncipe.
