= Maria Corrêa =

- Born: 1788; Príncipe
- Died: March 1, 1861 (aged 72–73)

Maria Corrêa Salema Ferreira (1788 – March 1, 1861) was a wealthy mestiza slave trader known as the princesa negra ("the black princess") of Príncipe.

Maria Corrêa was born in 1788 on Príncipe, the daughter of António Nogueira, a Brazilian militia officer, and Ana Maria de Almeida, a wealthy local woman. She married José Ferreira Gomes (1781-1837), a Brazilian officer and slave trader who is credited with introducing the cocoa plant to São Tomé and Príncipe. They lived at Casa de Cima-ló, the largest home on Principe. After his death, she married another wealthy Brazilian, Aureliano da Silva, who died in 1852. Maria Corrêa's wealth encompassed fifteen estates, six residences, and 376 enslaved Africans.
