= Camilo Domingos =

Santomean singer (1965–2005)

- Birth name: Domingos Lopes Gomes
- Born: February 14, 1965; Conceição, Príncipe Island, São Tomé and Príncipe
- Origin: Santomean
- Died: August 7, 2005 (aged 40)
- Genres: Kizomba; soukous; zouk
- Occupation: singer
- Instrument: Vocals
- Years active: 1990–2005

Camilo Domingos (February 14, 1965 – August 7, 2005) was a Santomean singer.

== Early life ==
Domingos was born in the settlement of Conceição on the island of Príncipe to a family of three children. Today, the city has a large population of Cape Verdean descendants. His father was Santomean and his mother was Cape Verdean.

== Career ==
He started his music career in 1991. He made 11 albums, including Badjuda, És Meu Amor, Maninha My Love, Nada a Ver, Sunduro and Nha Vida é Tchora. He made Dor de Mundo (Pain of the World) at the end of his career. He took part in several concerts and festivals in Angola, São Tomé and Príncipe, the United States and Portugal.

He died on August 7, 2005, at the age of 40.

== Discography ==
- Morena (1991)
- Hoje é Sábado (1992)
- Man Lê Lê (1993)
- Nada a Ver (1994)
- Dinheiro (1995)
- Maninha My Love (1996)
- Pamode un Ca Meréss(1999)
- Nova Onda(2000)
- Pomba (2001)
- Sundurro (2002)
- The Best of (2003)
- Dor de Mundo (2005)
