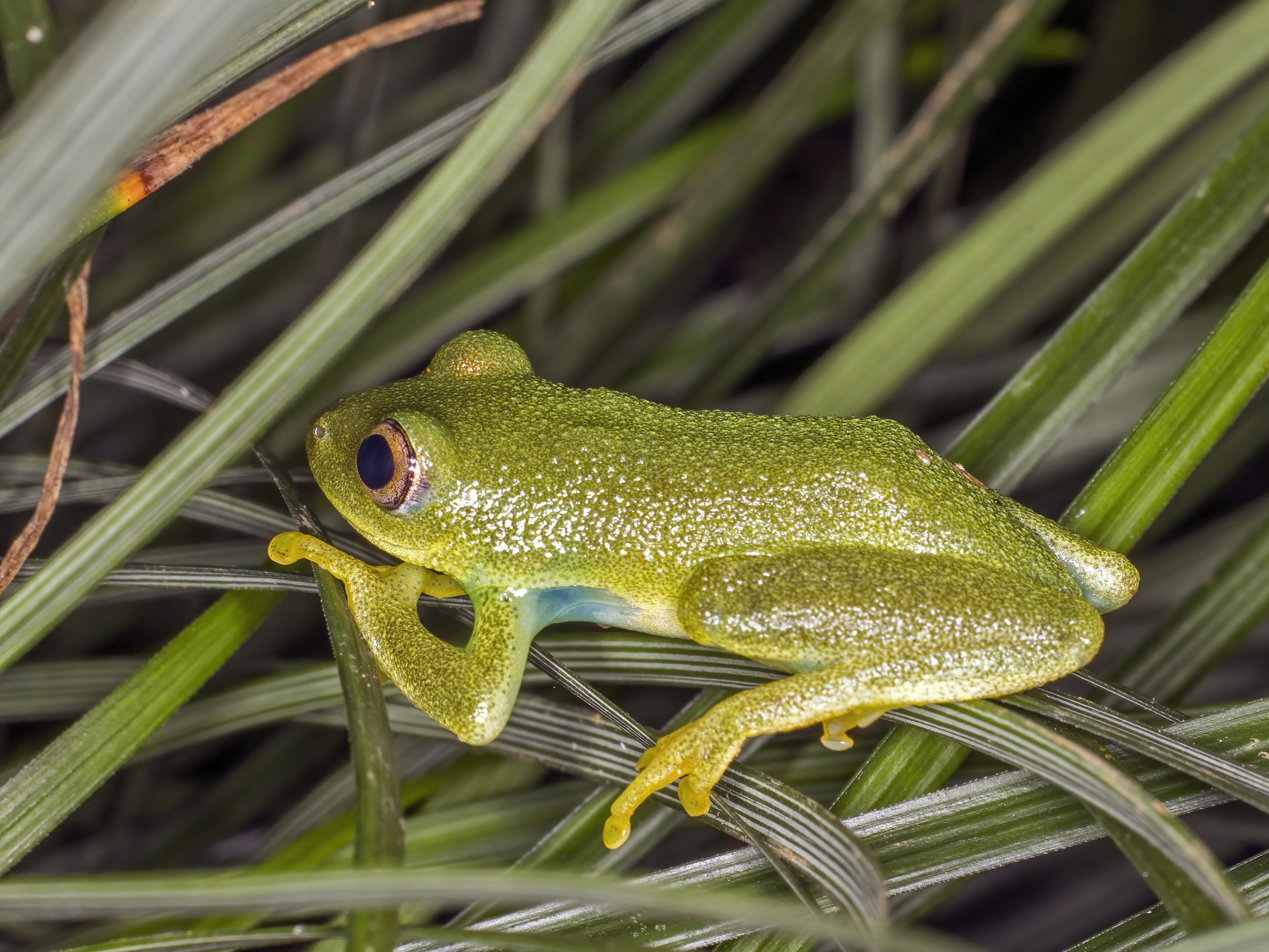

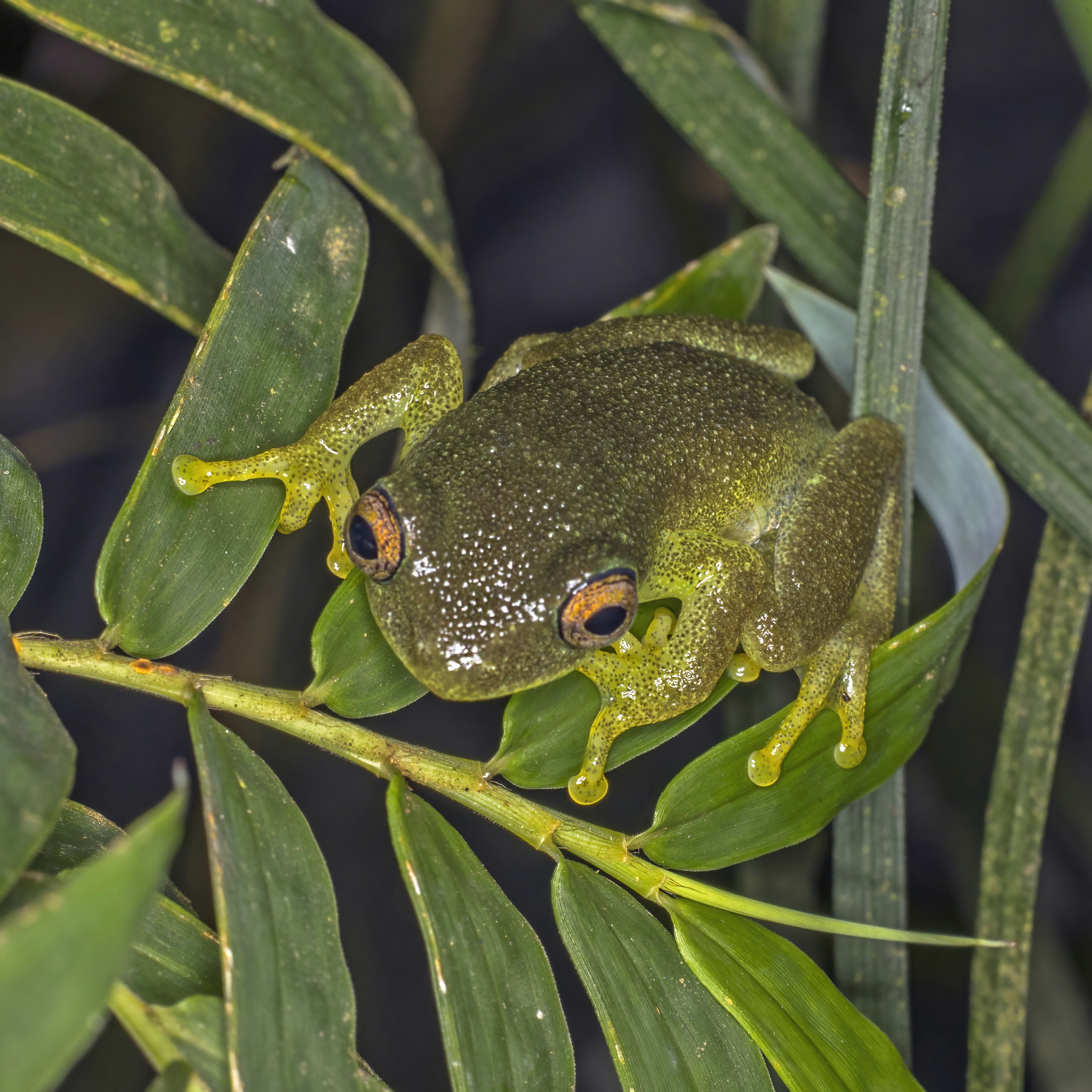
- On Príncipe

Scientific classification
- Kingdom: Animalia
- Phylum: Chordata
- Class: Amphibia
- Order: Anura
- Family: Hyperoliidae
- Genus: Hyperolius
- Species: H. drewesi

Binomial name
- Hyperolius drewesi R. C. Bell, 2016
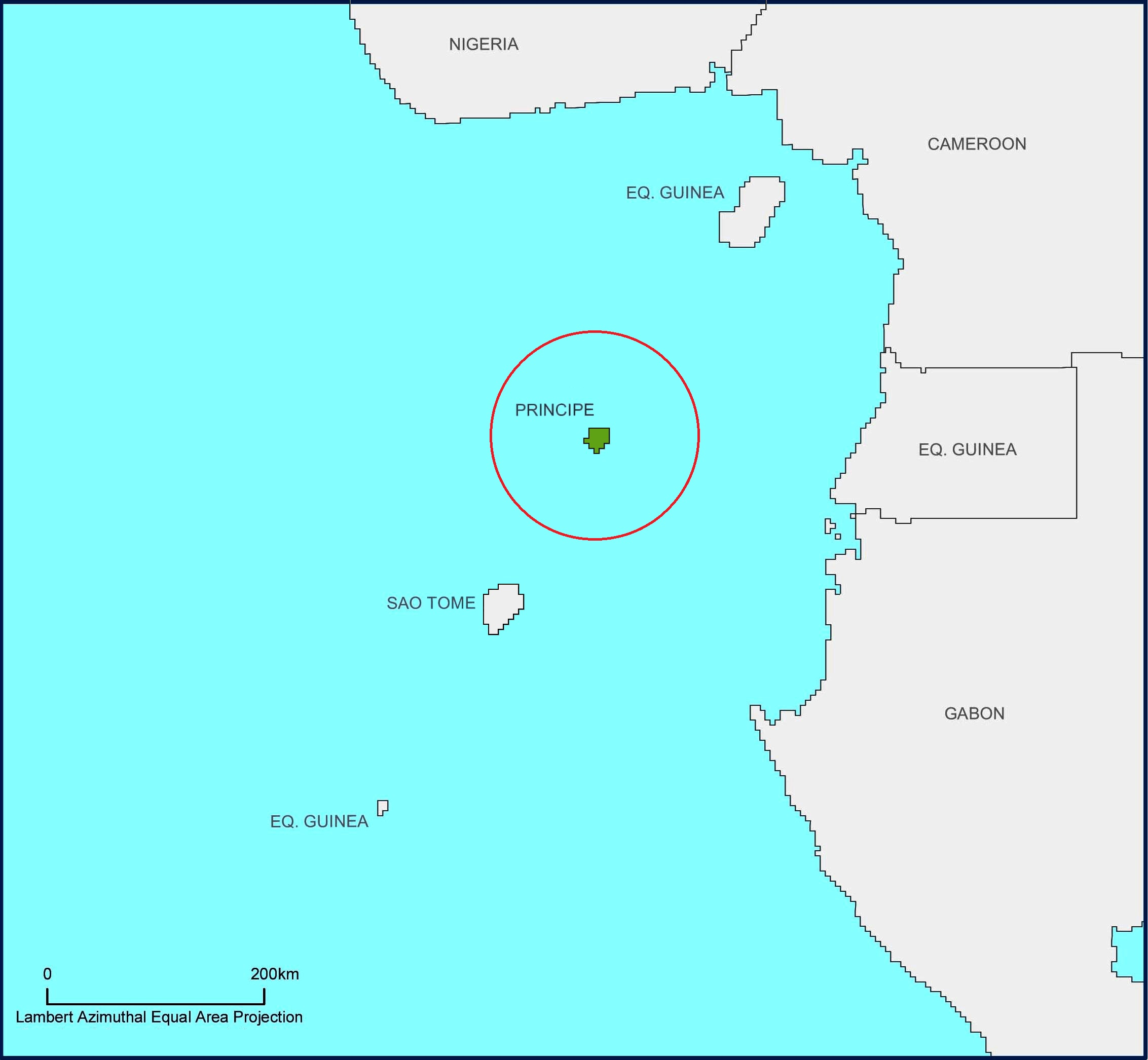
- range

= Hyperolius drewesi =

Species of frog

Hyperolius drewesi is a species of frog in the family Hyperoliidae. It is endemic to the island of Príncipe in São Tomé and Príncipe. Common names include Oceanic tree frog and Drewes' reed frog. It is the only Reed frog found on Príncipe Island.

== Description ==
Hyperolius drewesi is described from 17 males and one female, the male snout-vent range 24.8 – 30.9 mm and the female 32.7 mm. Both sexes are green. Juvenile coloration is tan with bright yellow dorsolateral lines.
