= Ilhéu Caroço =

Island in São Tomé and Príncipe

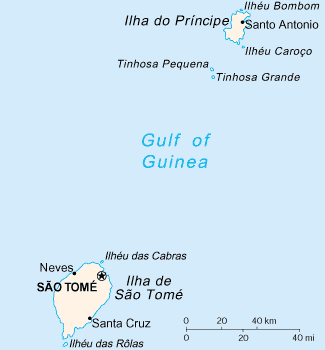
- Map of São Tomé and Príncipe with Ilhéu Caroço southeast of the island of Príncipe
- Interactive map of Ilhéu Caroço

Geography
- Location: southeast of the island of Príncipe, São Tomé and Príncipe
- Coordinates: 1.514°N 7.431°E
- Area: 0.4 km^{2} (0.15 sq mi)
- Highest elevation: 305 m (1001 ft)

Administration
- São Tomé and Príncipe

Demographics
- Population: 0

Ilhéu Caroço, also called Ilhéu Boné de Jóquei, which translates to Jokey Cap Island, is an uninhabited islet in the Gulf of Guinea, part of São Tomé and Príncipe. The islet is located about 2.5 km southeast of the island of Príncipe. Its area is about 0.4 km^{2}. The islet is steep, rocky and wooded, and rises to 305 metres elevation. Just off the coast is another much smaller islet.
