= Phrynobatrachus leveleve =

Conservation status
- Least Concern (IUCN 3.1)

Scientific classification
- Kingdom: Animalia
- Phylum: Chordata
- Class: Amphibia
- Order: Anura
- Family: Phrynobatrachidae
- Genus: Phrynobatrachus
- Species: P. leveleve

Binomial name
- Phrynobatrachus leveleve Uyeda, Drewes & Zimkus, 2007
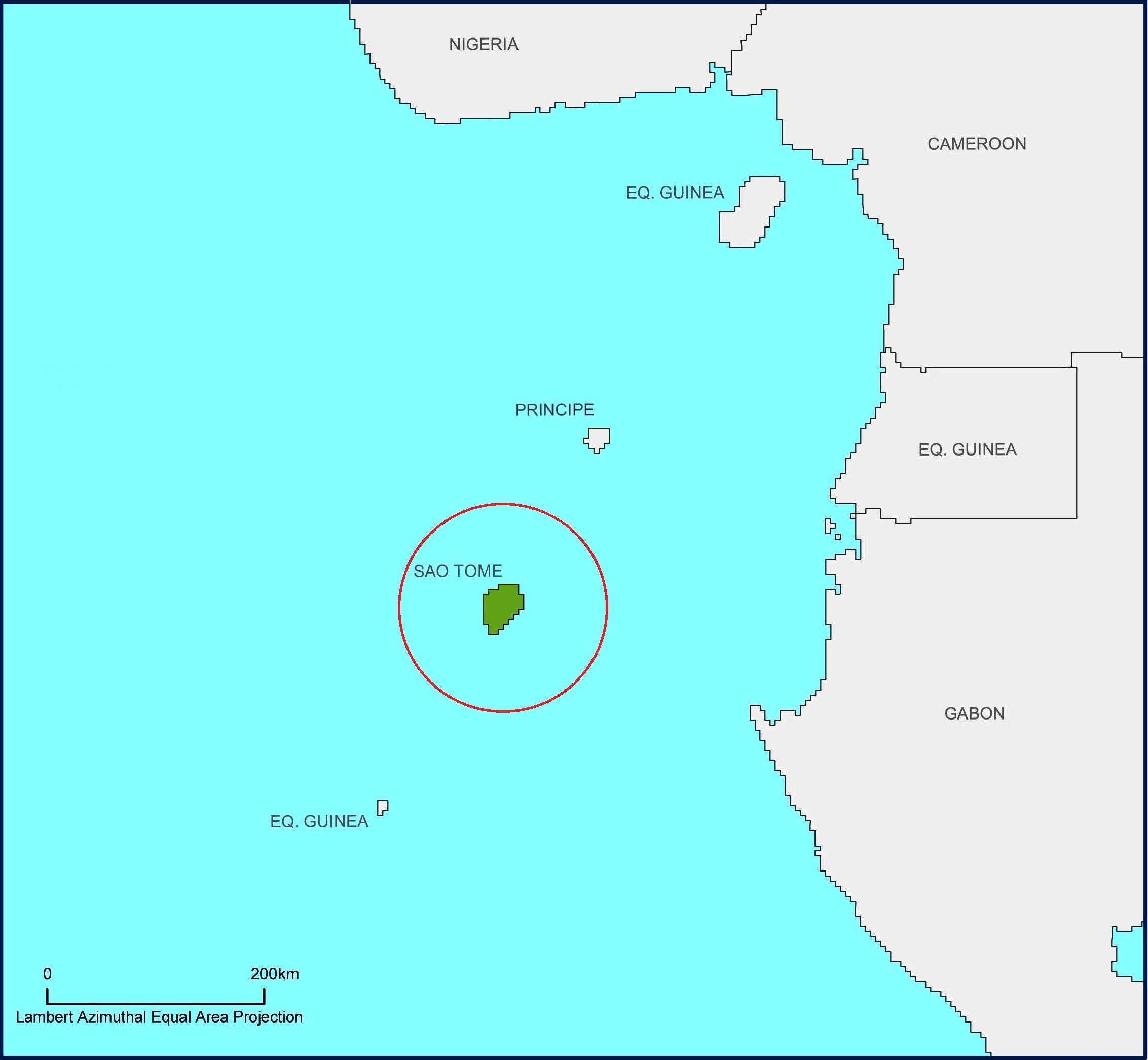
- range

Species of amphibian

Phrynobatrachus leveleve is a species of frog in the family Phrynobatrachidae. It is endemic to São Tomé and Príncipe and is listed as least concern by the IUCN. Its natural habitats are subtropical or tropical moist lowland forest, subtropical or tropical moist montane forest, rivers, freshwater marshes, intermittent freshwater marshes, plantations, rural gardens, heavily degraded former forest, and ponds. They are found on the island of São Tomé and the associated Ilhéu das Rolas in areas up to 1,412 meters above sea level.

The species name leveleve is São Tomé Creole meaning "calmly", referring to the easy-going manner of the citizens of São Tomé and Príncipe according to the authors who named the species.

== See also ==
- Phrynobatrachus dispar – endemic on the island of Príncipe
