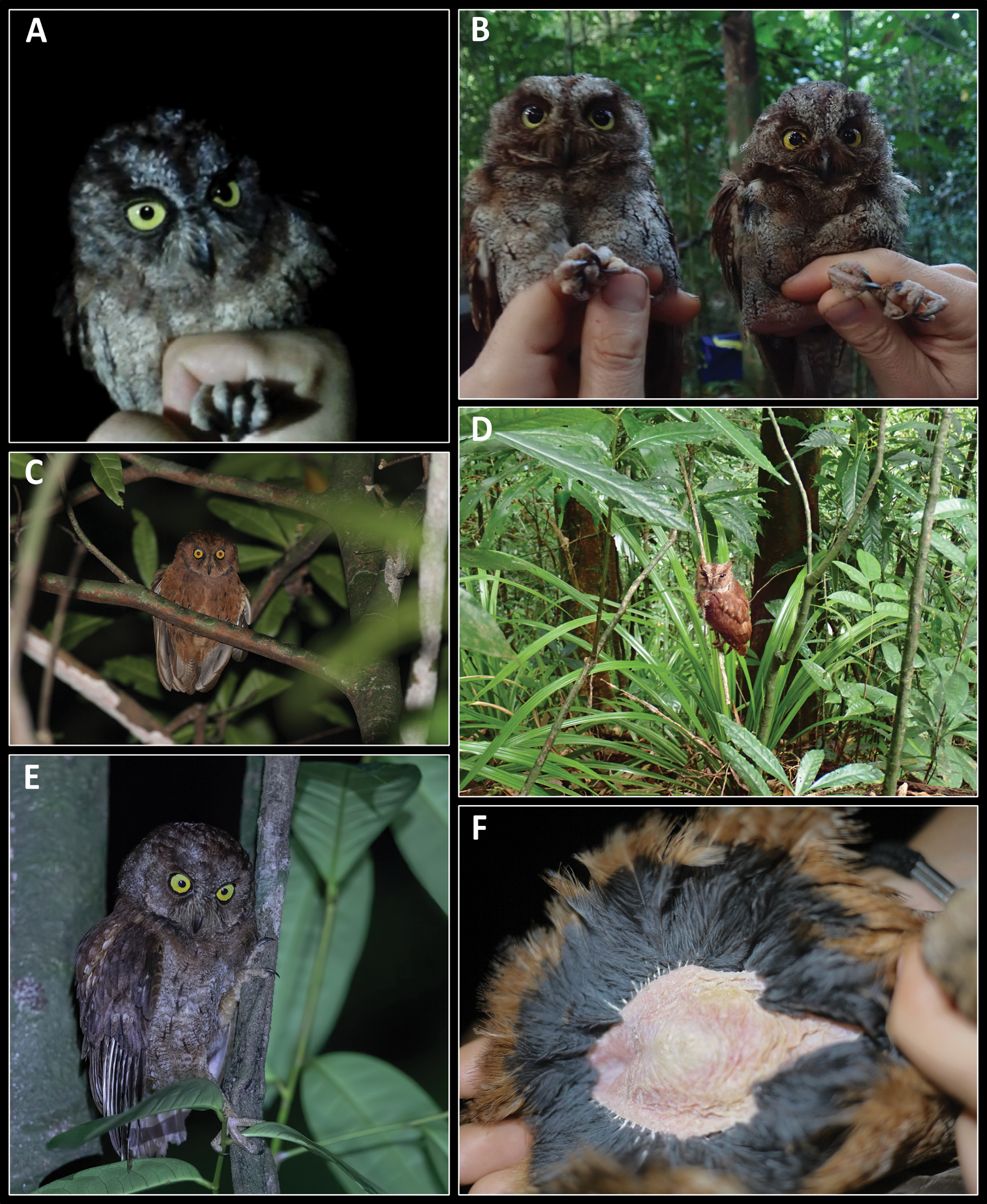
- A composite of photographs of the Principe scops owl

Conservation status
- Critically Endangered (IUCN 3.1)

Scientific classification
- Kingdom: Animalia
- Phylum: Chordata
- Class: Aves
- Order: Strigiformes
- Family: Strigidae
- Genus: Otus
- Species: O. bikegila

Binomial name
- Otus bikegila Melo et al., 2022

= Principe scops owl =

Species of owl

The Principe scops owl (Otus bikegila) is a species of scops owl found only on Príncipe Island of São Tomé and Príncipe, an island country in the Gulf of Guinea off the coast of Africa. First noticed by its distinctive nighttime call, it was formally described in 2022. The first records of suspicions of its existence are from 1928. Given its low population numbers and tiny range, researchers have asked the IUCN to declare it Critically Endangered, and this status was granted in 2023. Its distribution is limited to native forests where human activity is low—in fact, its range is entirely within a protected area, the Príncipe Obô Natural Park—and it seems to prefer larger trees. It feeds on insects. Its predators include the Mona monkey and the black rat.

== Call ==
The bird's call has been described as "tuu," repeated quickly, sometimes in duets. The birds begin to call almost as soon as it gets dark. Another of its calls is "cat-like" and can exist either in isolation or repetition. Duets are common; females call at a higher pitch.

== Etymology ==
The owl's Latin name was given in honor of park ranger and former parrot harvester Ceciliano "Bikegila" do Bom Jesus.

== See also ==
- List of bird species described in the 2020s
