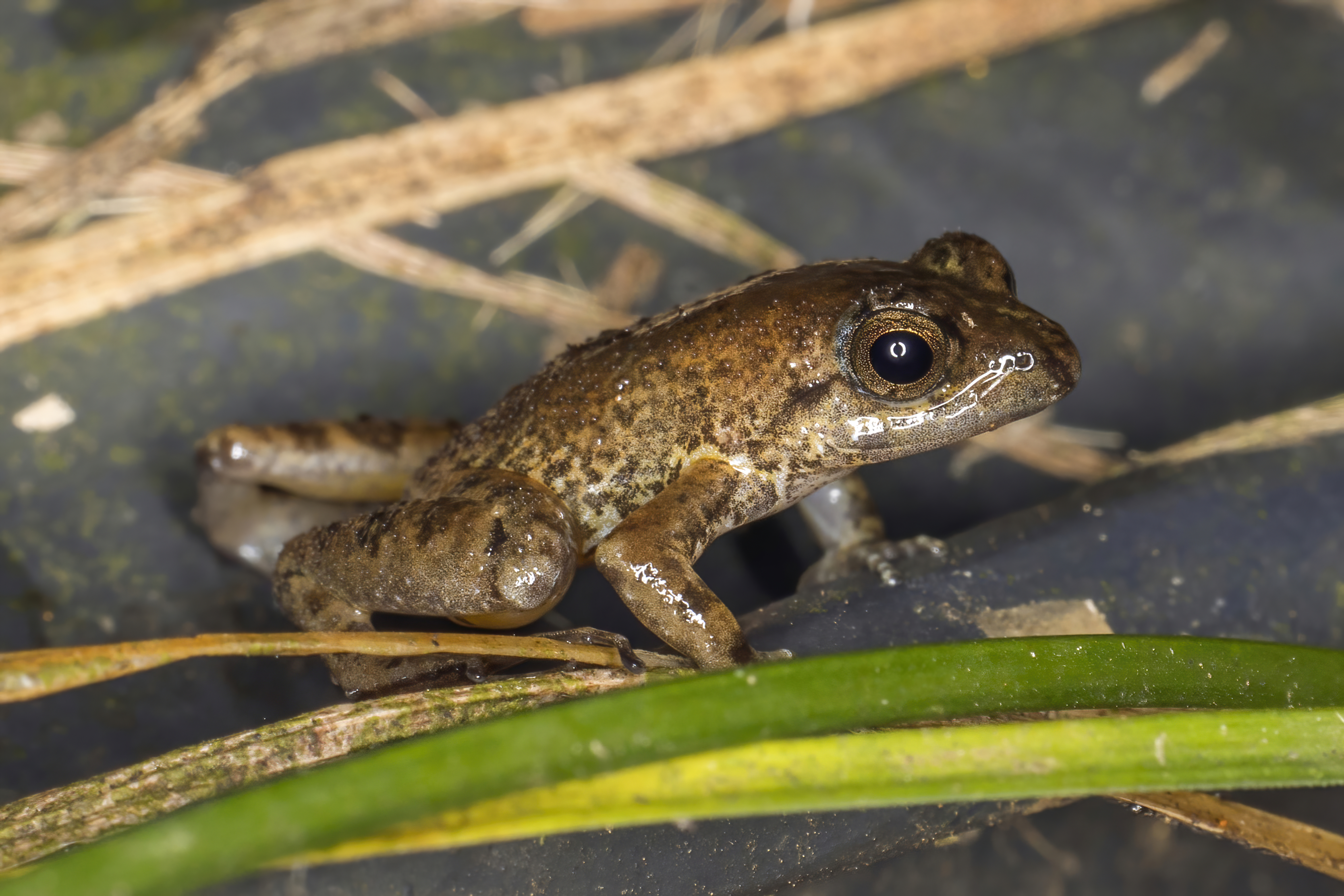

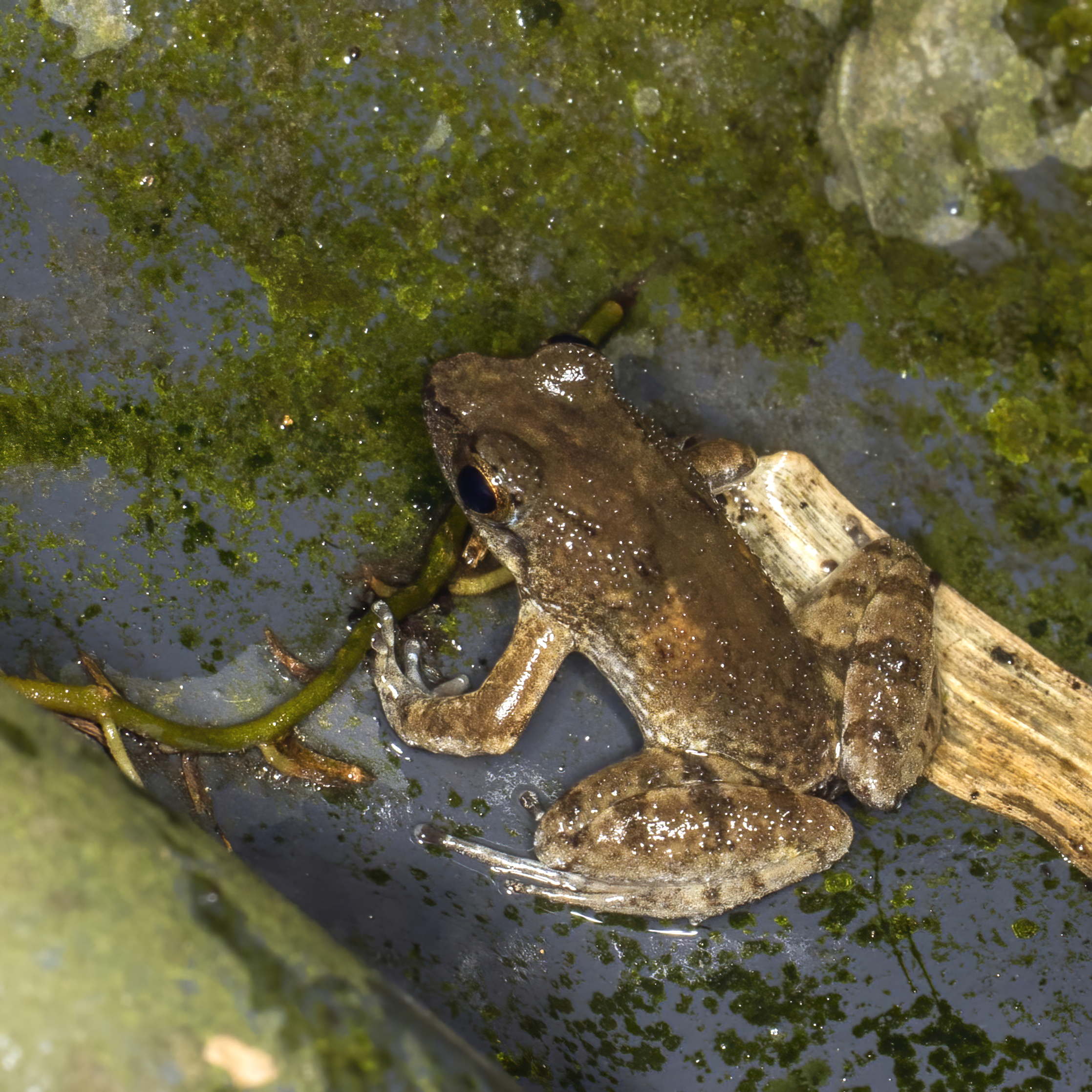

Conservation status
- Least Concern (IUCN 3.1)

Scientific classification
- Kingdom: Animalia
- Phylum: Chordata
- Class: Amphibia
- Order: Anura
- Family: Phrynobatrachidae
- Genus: Phrynobatrachus
- Species: P. dispar

Binomial name
- Phrynobatrachus dispar (Peters, 1870)
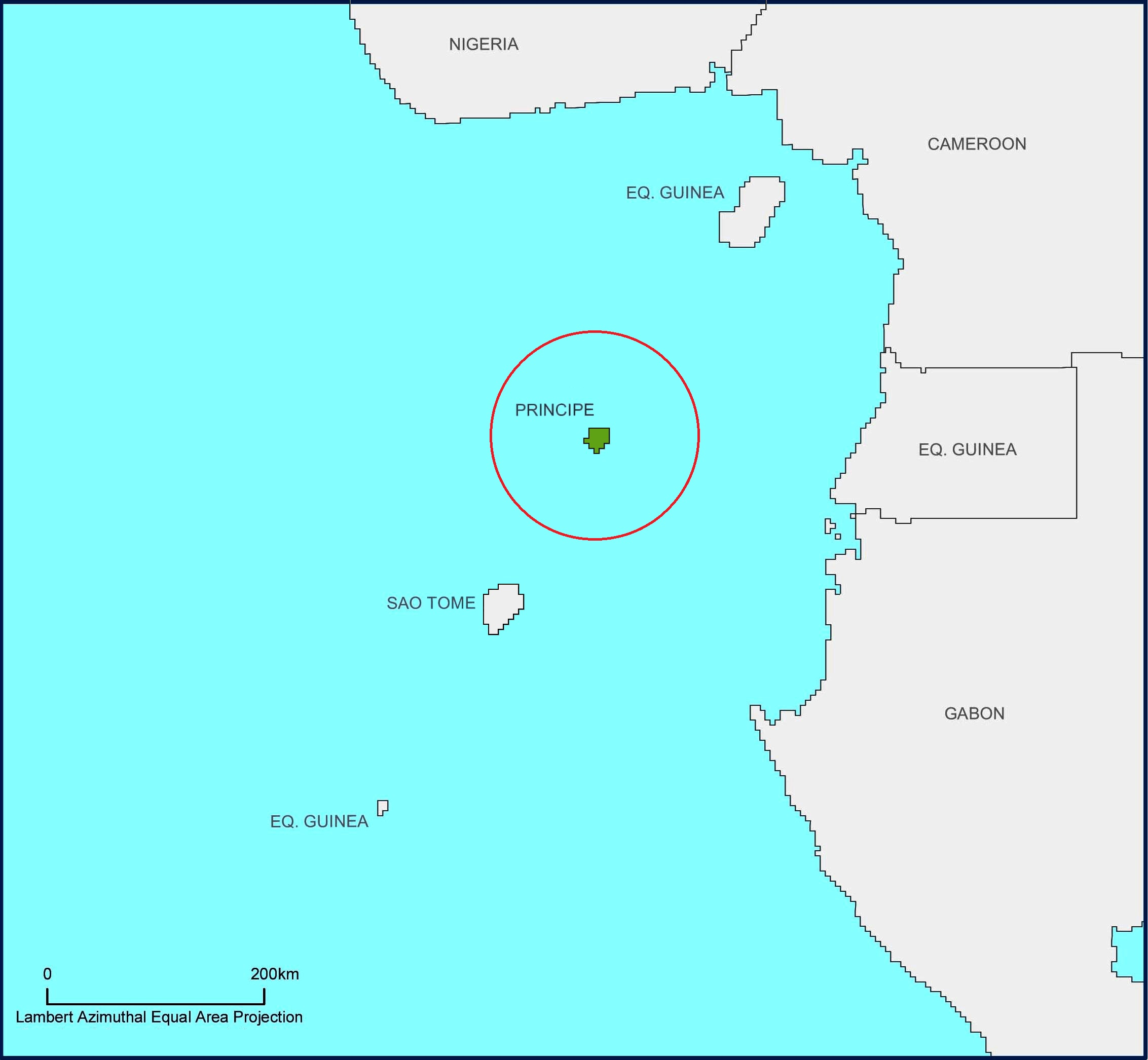
- range

Synonyms
- Arthroleptis dispar Peters, 1870; Phrynobatrachus feae Boulenger, 1906

= Phrynobatrachus dispar =

Príncipe puddle frog

Species of frog

Phrynobatrachus dispar is a species of frog in the family Phrynobatrachidae. It is known as Peters' river frog and the Príncipe puddle frog. It is endemic to São Tomé and Príncipe. Its natural habitat is puddles in primary forest, farm bush (heavily degraded former forest), and abandoned plantations. It was first described as Arthroleptis dispar by Wilhelm Peters in 1870. The species is found on the island of Príncipe in areas up to 947 meters above sea level.

== See also ==
- Phrynobatrachus leveleve
