= Príncipe =

Island of São Tome and Príncipe

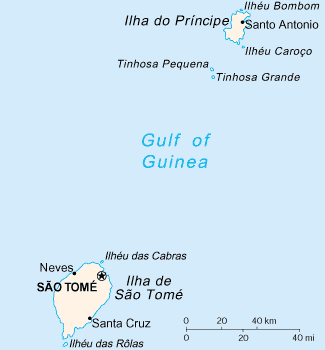
- Map of São Tomé and Príncipe with Príncipe island near the right top corner
- Interactive map of Príncipe

Geography
- Location: Gulf of Guinea
- Coordinates: 1°37′N 7°24′E
- Archipelago: Cameroon line
- Area: 136 km^{2} (53 sq mi)
- Highest elevation: 947 m (3107 ft)
- Highest point: Pico de Príncipe

Administration
- São Tomé and Príncipe
- Districts: 1 (Pagué)
- Capital city: Santo António

Demographics
- Demonym: Príncipean or Principean
- Population: 8,420 (2018)
- Pop. density: 59.3/km^{2} (153.6/sq mi)

Additional information
- Area code: 00239-19x-xxxx?

Príncipe (/ˈprɪnsɪpə, -peɪ/; Portuguese: [ˈpɾĩsɨpɨ]) is the smaller, northern major island of the country of São Tomé and Príncipe lying off the west coast of Africa in the Gulf of Guinea. It has an area of 142 square kilometres (55 sq mi) (including offshore islets) and a population of 7,324 at the 2012 Census; the latest official estimate (at May 2018) was 8,420. The island is a heavily eroded volcano speculated to be over three million years old, surrounded by smaller islands including Ilheu Bom Bom, Ilhéu Caroço, Tinhosa Grande and Tinhosa Pequena. Part of the Cameroon Line archipelago, Príncipe rises in the south to 947 metres at Pico do Príncipe. The island is the main constituent of the Autonomous Region of Príncipe, established in 1995, and of the coterminous district of Pagué.

== History ==
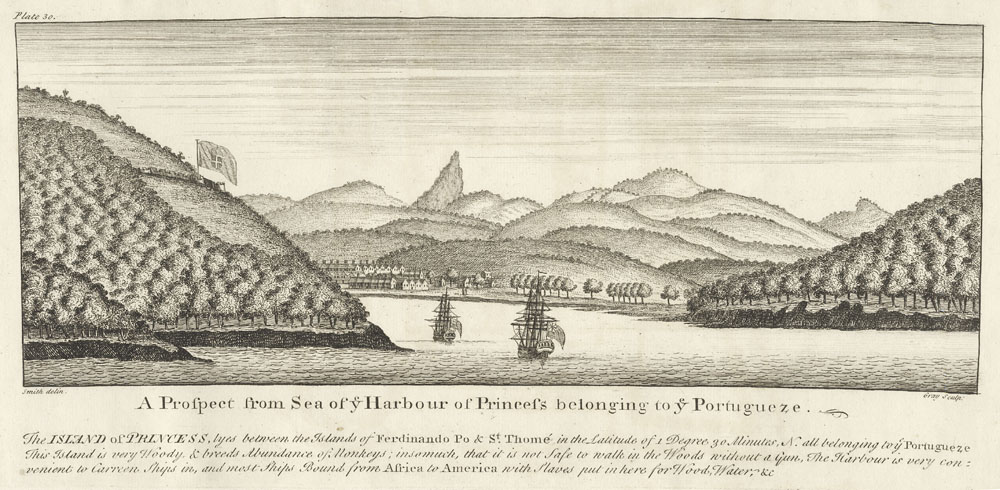
Entrance to the harbour of Principe, from a 1727 engraving: the accompanying text mistranslates the island's name as 'Princess' and refers to it as being, very Woody and breeds abundance of Monkeys, insomuch that it is not safe to walk in the Woods without a gun. The harbour is very convenient to Careen Ships in, and most Ships Bound from Africa to America with Slaves put in here for Food, Water etc."

The island was uninhabited when discovered by the Portuguese on 17 January 1471 and was first named after Saint Anthony ("Ilha de Santo Antão"). Later the island was renamed Príncipe ("Prince") by King John II of Portugal in honour of his son Afonso, Hereditary Prince of Portugal (1475–1491). The first settlement, the town of Santo António, was founded in 1502. Subsequently, the north and centre of the island were made into plantations by Portuguese colonists using slave labor. These concentrated initially on producing sugar and after 1822 on cocoa, becoming the world's greatest cocoa producer. Since independence, these exploitative plantations have largely reverted to forest.

The island's fortress named Fortaleza de Santo António da Ponta da Mina on a point inside Baía de Santo António (Santo António Bay) was built in 1695. In 1706, the city and the fortress were destroyed by the French. From 1753 until 1852, Santo António was the colonial capital of Portuguese São Tomé and Príncipe.

Príncipe was the site where Einstein's theory of relativity was experimentally corroborated by Arthur Stanley Eddington and his team during the total solar eclipse of May 29, 1919; photographs of the eclipse revealed evidence of the bending of starlight, in accordance with Einstein's predictions (see Eddington experiment).

On April 29, 1995, the Autonomous Region of Príncipe was established, corresponding with the existing Pagué District.

== Settlements ==
Príncipe has one town, Santo António, and an airport (IATA code: PCP, ICAO: FPPR). Some other smaller settlements are Sundy and Porto Real.

== Demographics ==
Portuguese is the official and main language of the island. Portuguese creoles are also spoken: Principense or Lunguyê and, in some scale, Forro are also spoken.

In 1771, Príncipe had a population of 5,850: 111 whites, 165 free mulattoes, 6 mulatto slaves, 900 free blacks, and 4,668 black slaves. In 1875, the year when slavery was officially abolished in the archipelago, Príncipe's population had dropped to only 1,946, of whom 45 were Europeans, 1,521 were free natives, and 380 were freemen.

In 2018, Príncipe had a population of 8,420 people.

== Nature ==
In 2006, the Parque Natural Obô do Príncipe was established, covering the mountainous, densely forested and uninhabited southern part of the island of Príncipe. There are numerous endemic species of fauna on Príncipe, including birds such as the Principe scops owl, the Príncipe kingfisher, Príncipe seedeater, Principe starling, Príncipe sunbird, Dohrn's thrush-babbler and the Príncipe weaver. The Príncipe white-eye also occurs on São Tomé. Geckos include the Príncipe gecko, frogs include the palm forest tree frog and the Príncipe puddle frog. Marine fauna includes Muricopsis principensis, a mollusc and the West African mud turtle.

=== Some endemic animals ===
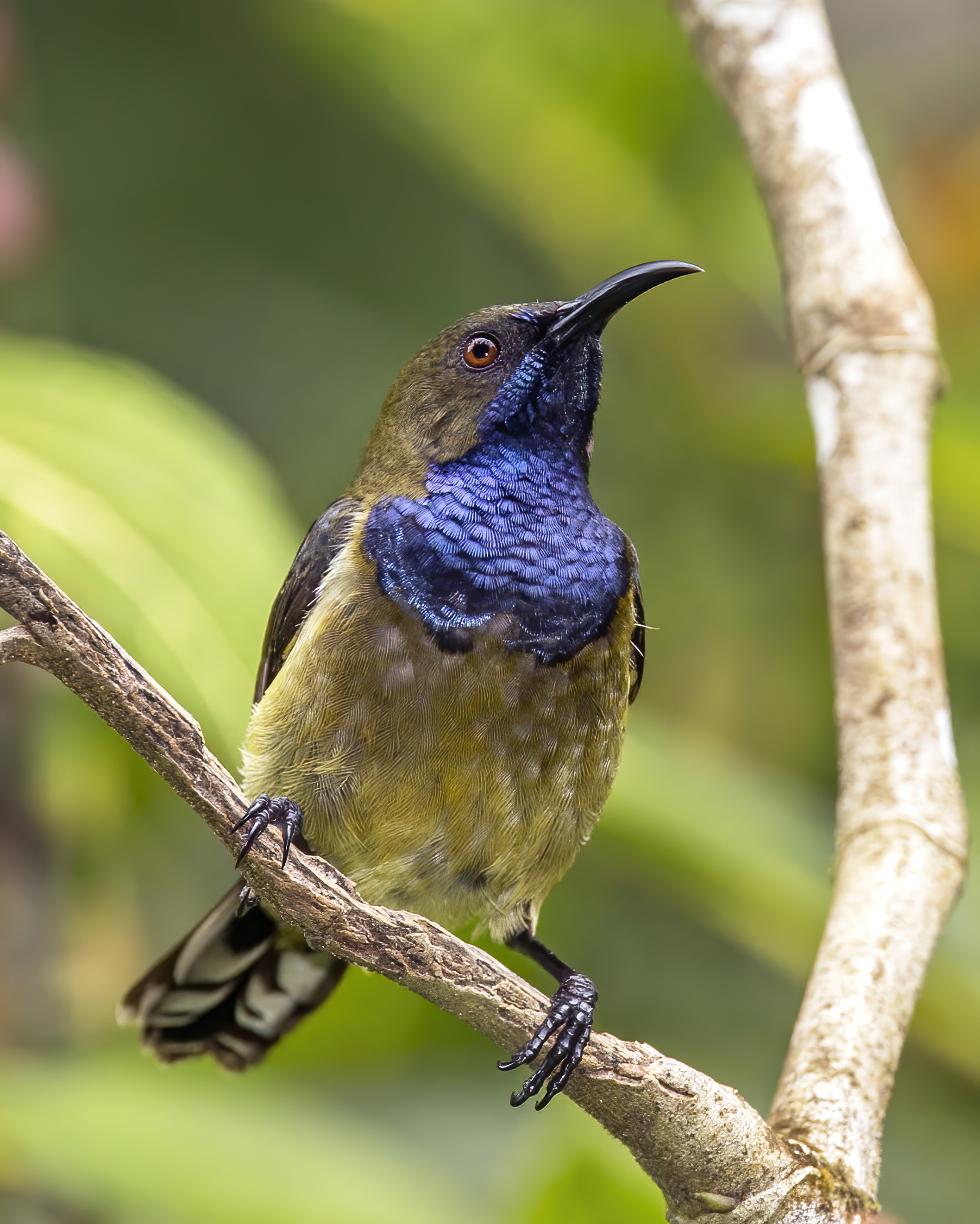
Príncipe sunbird

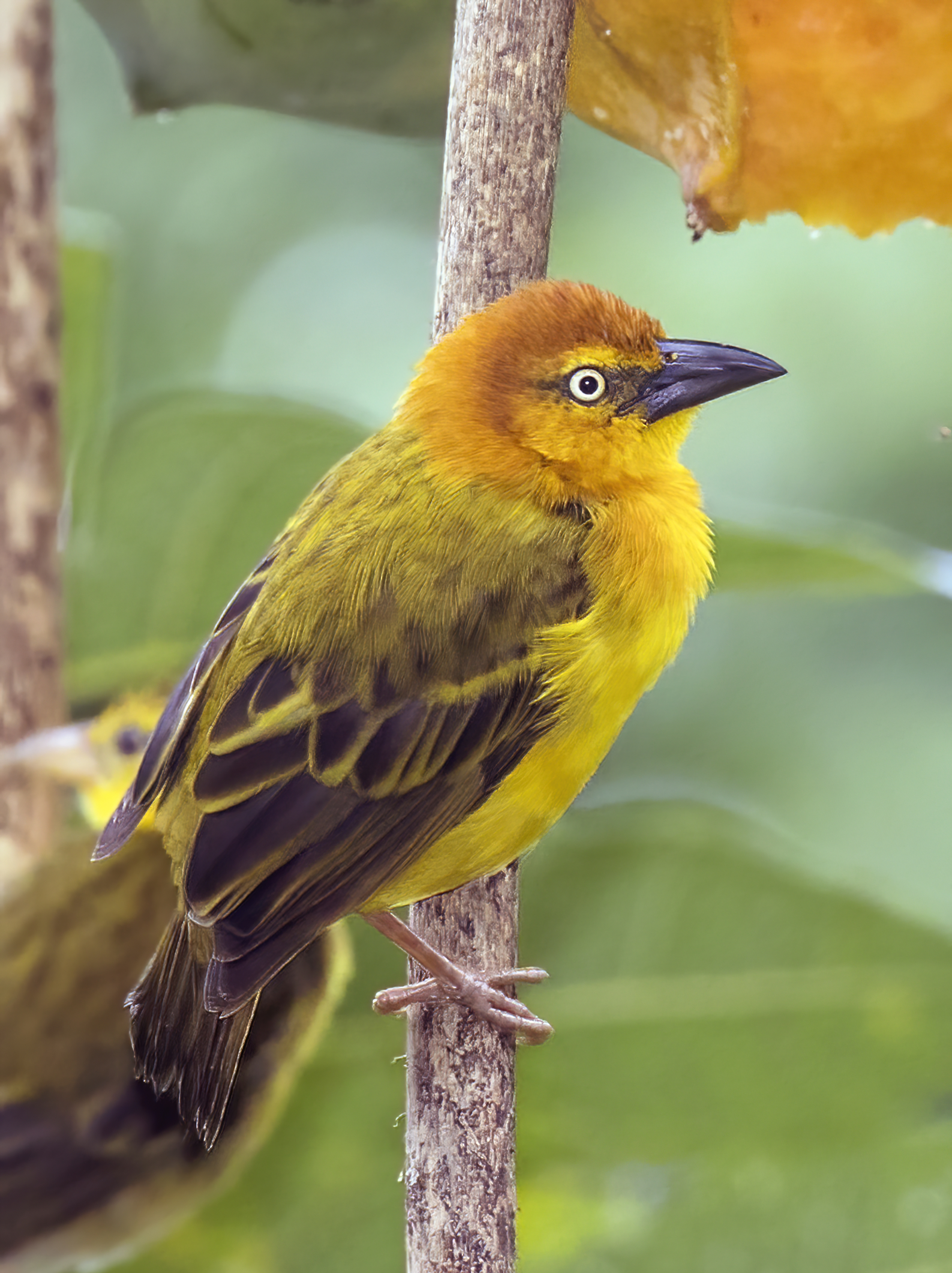
Príncipe golden weaver

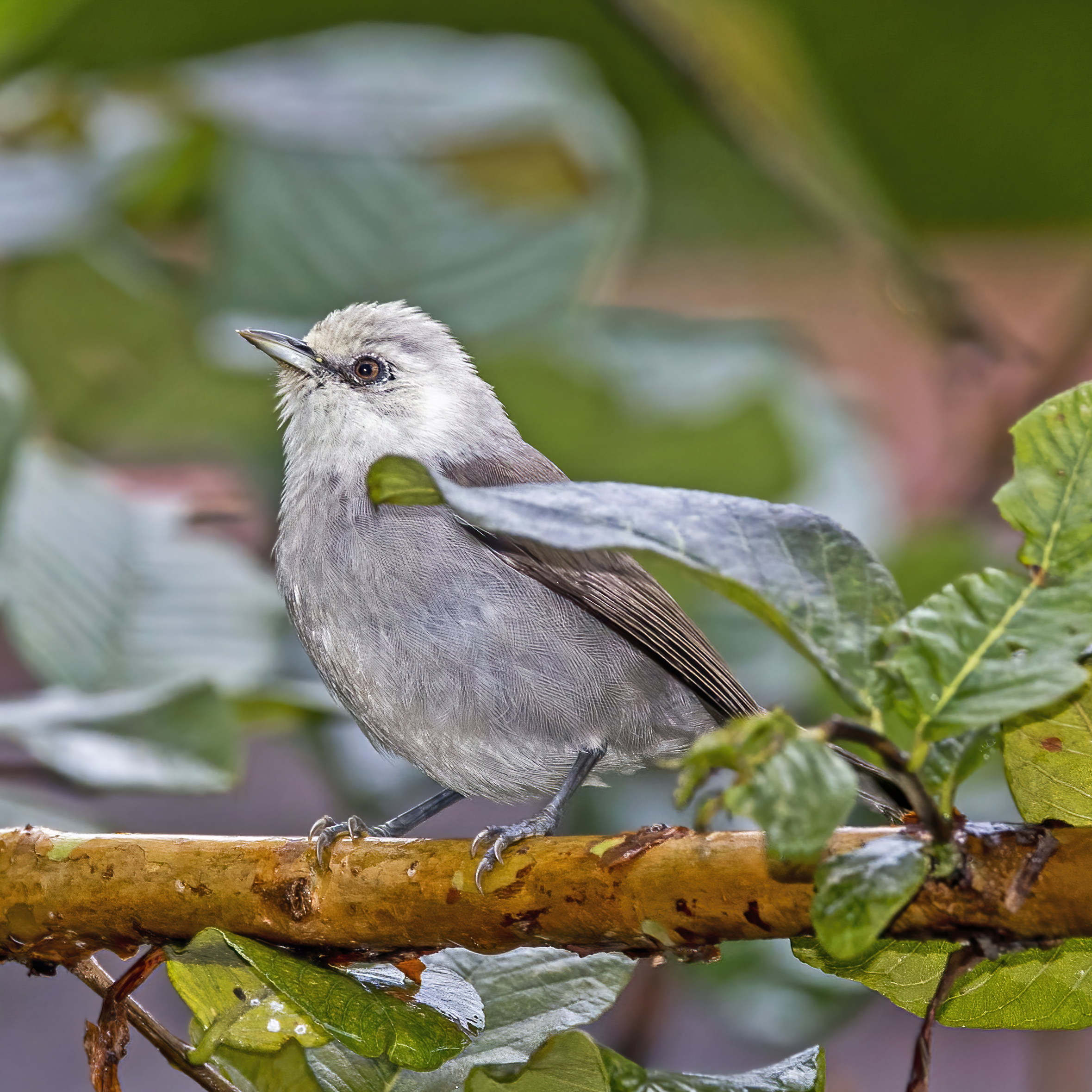
Príncipe speirops

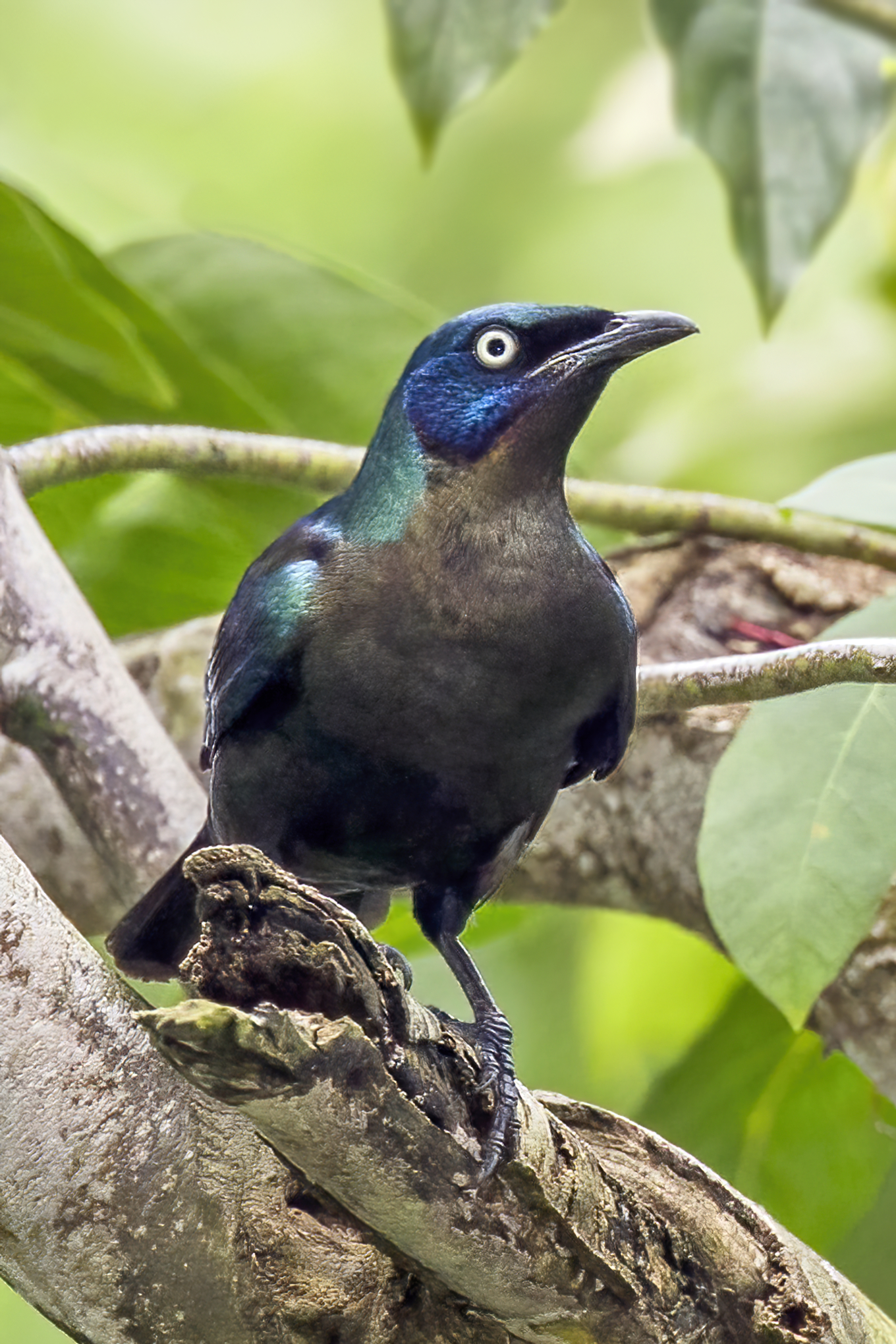
Principe glossy starling

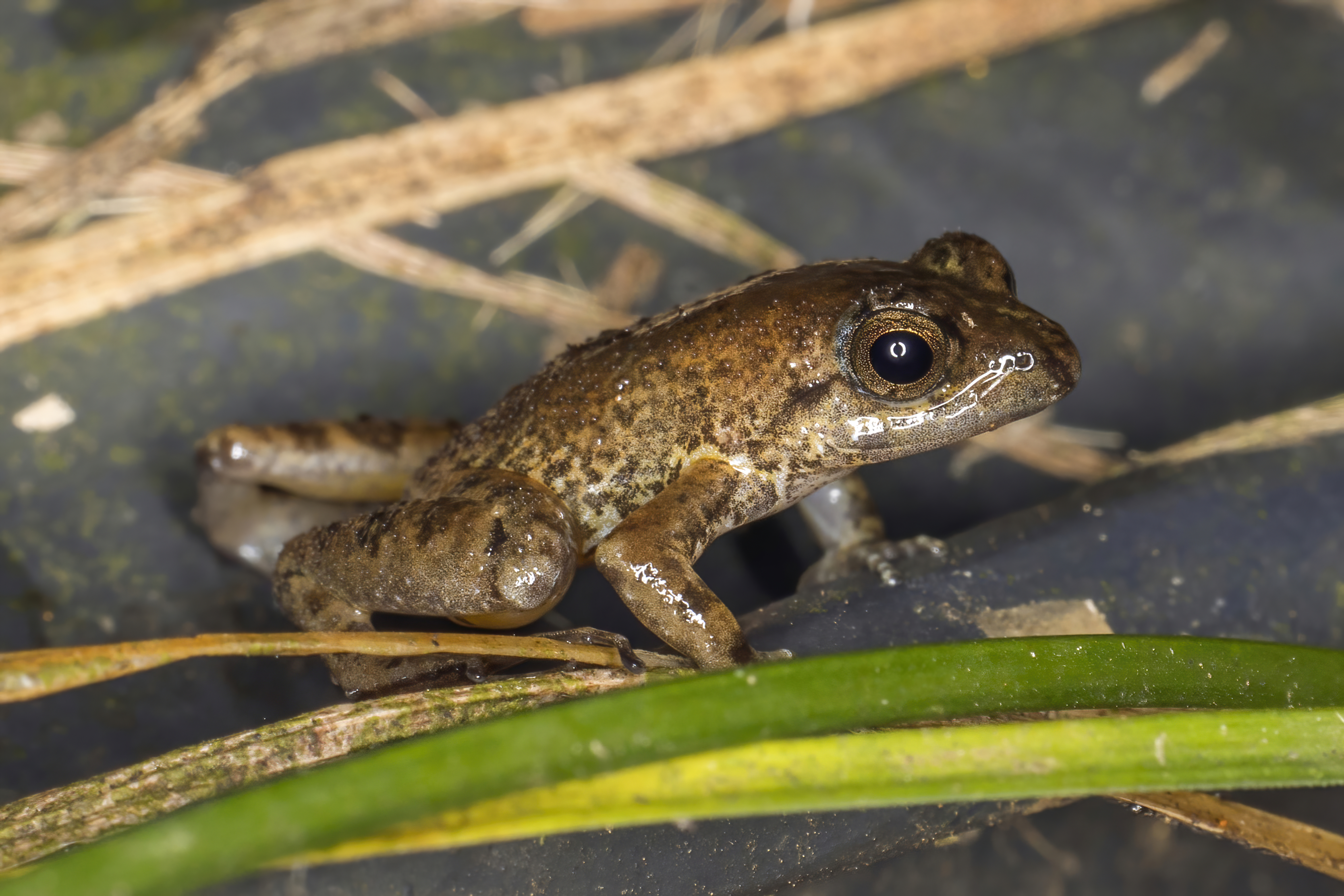
Príncipe puddle frog

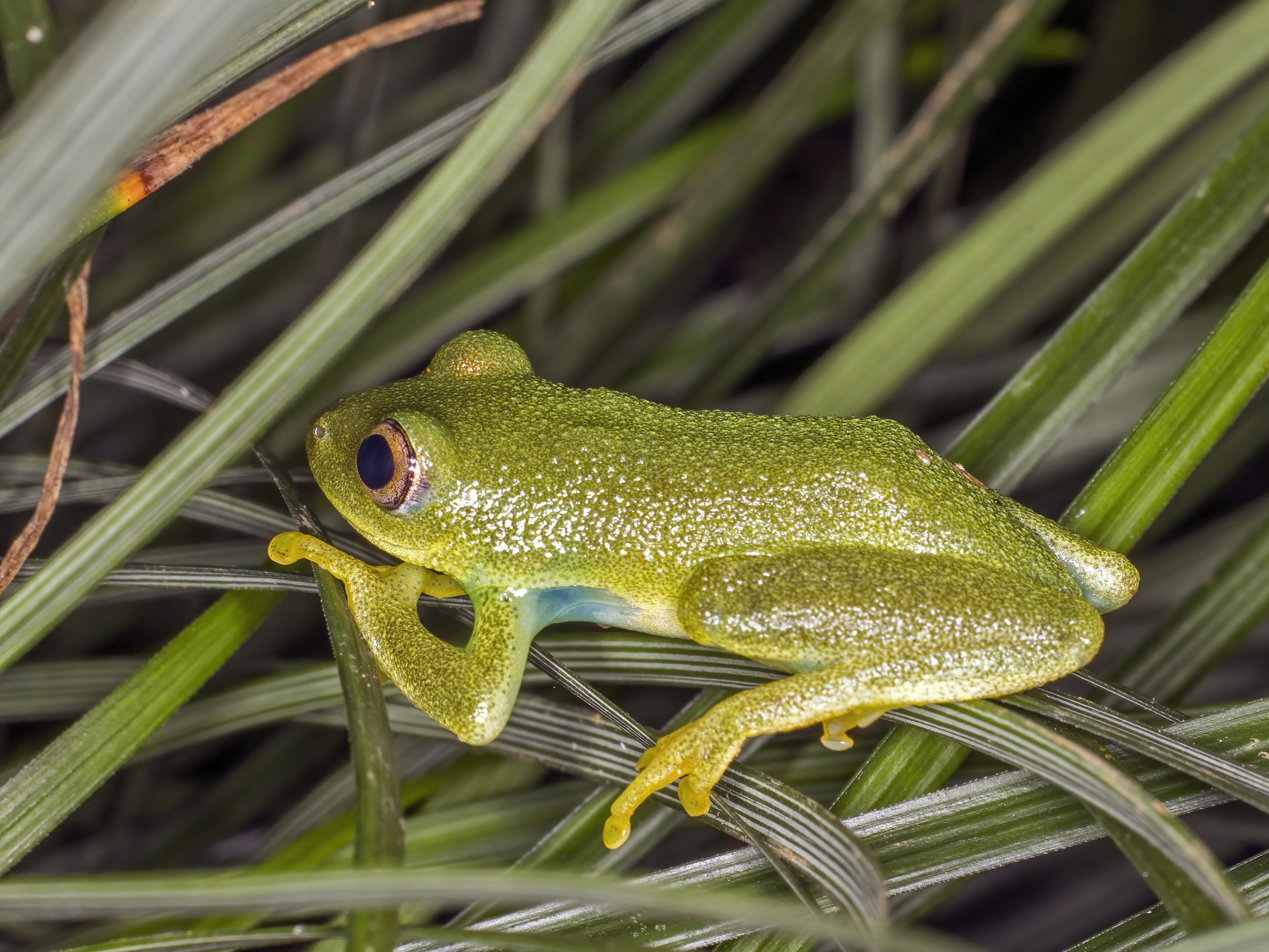
Oceanic tree frog

=== Ecological reserve ===
UNESCO established the Island of Príncipe Biosphere Reserve in 2012 under the Man and the Biosphere Programme. The reserve encompasses the entire emerged area of the island of Príncipe, and its islets Bom Bom, Boné do Jóquei, Mosteiros, Santana, and Pedra da Galei, and the Tinhosas islands. The biosphere was extended in 2025 to São Tomé, making São Tomé and Príncipe the first country to be designated as such in its entirety.

== Notable people ==
- Damião Vaz d'Almeida, former Prime Minister of São Tomé and Príncipe
- João Paulo Cassandra, former autonomous president of the island (2005–2006)
- José Cassandra, former autonomous president of the island (2006–2020)
- Sara Pinto Coelho, colonial born Portuguese writer
- Camilo Domingos, singer
- Manuela Margarido, writer
- Nuno Espírito Santo, association football goalkeeper and manager

== Gallery ==
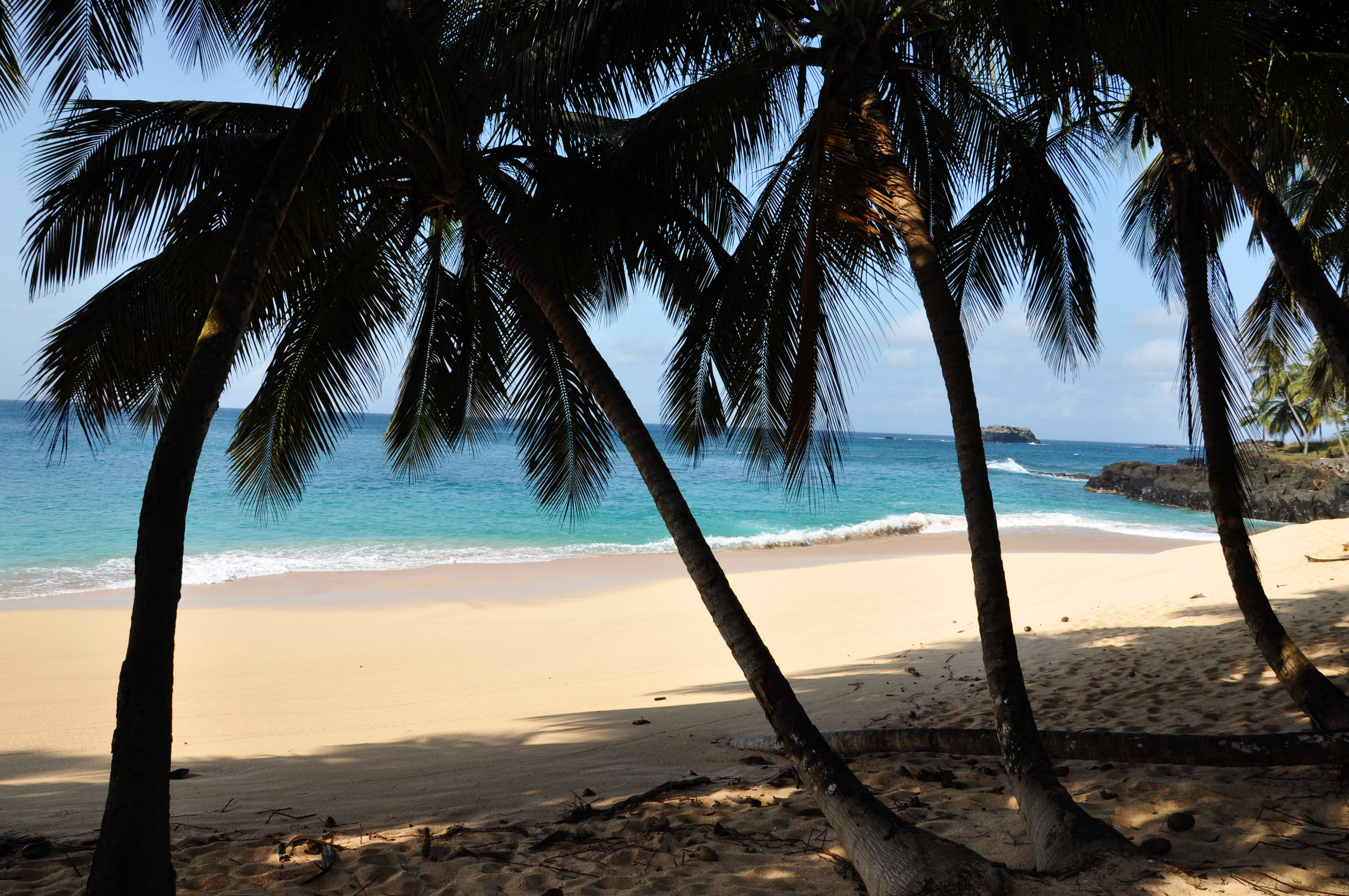
Praia do Boi, in Príncipe

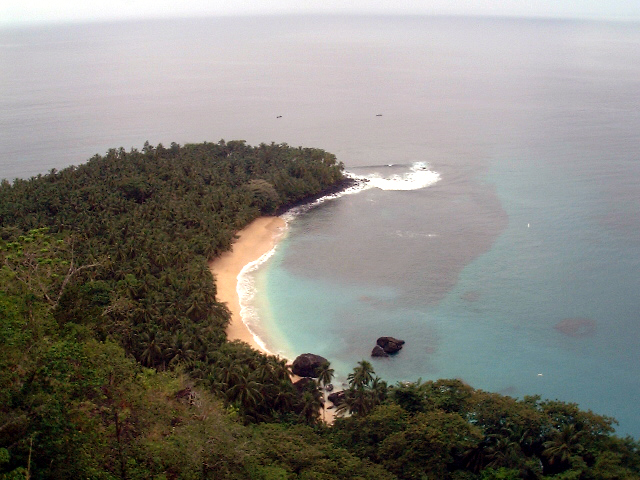
Praia das Bananas, São Tomé and Príncipe

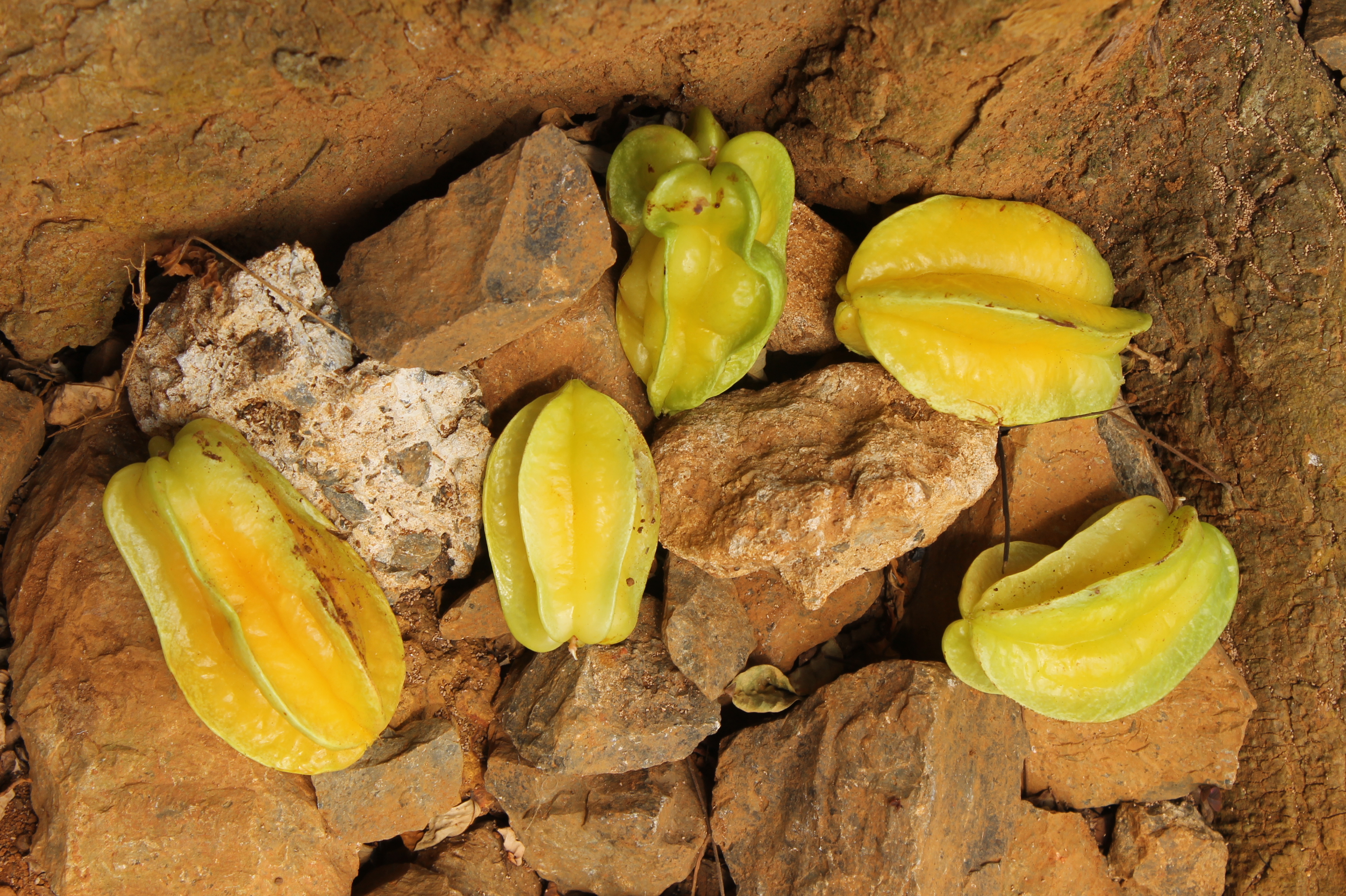
Carambola in Príncipe

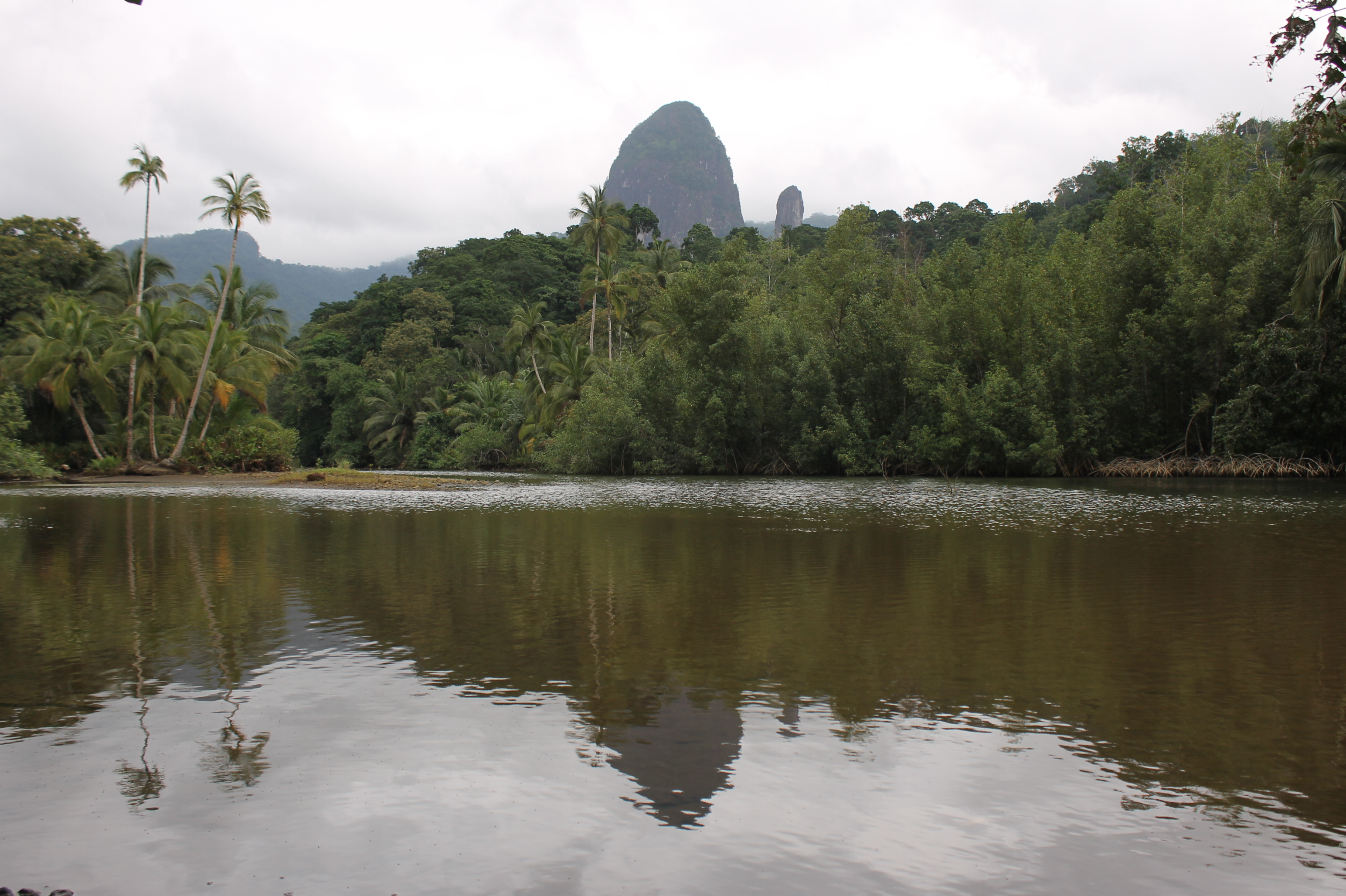
Lagoa do Caixão, Príncipe Island

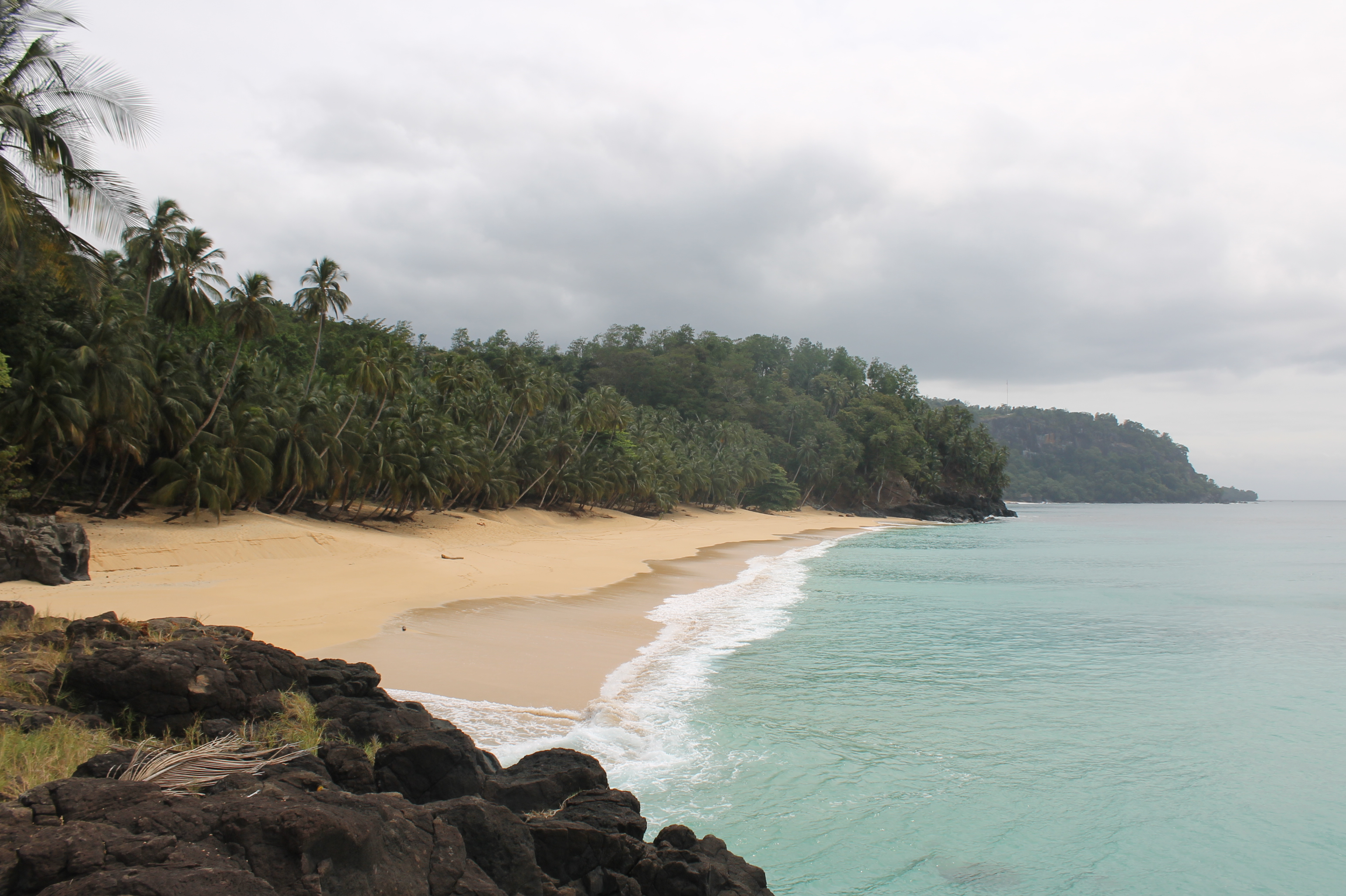
Beach in Príncipe

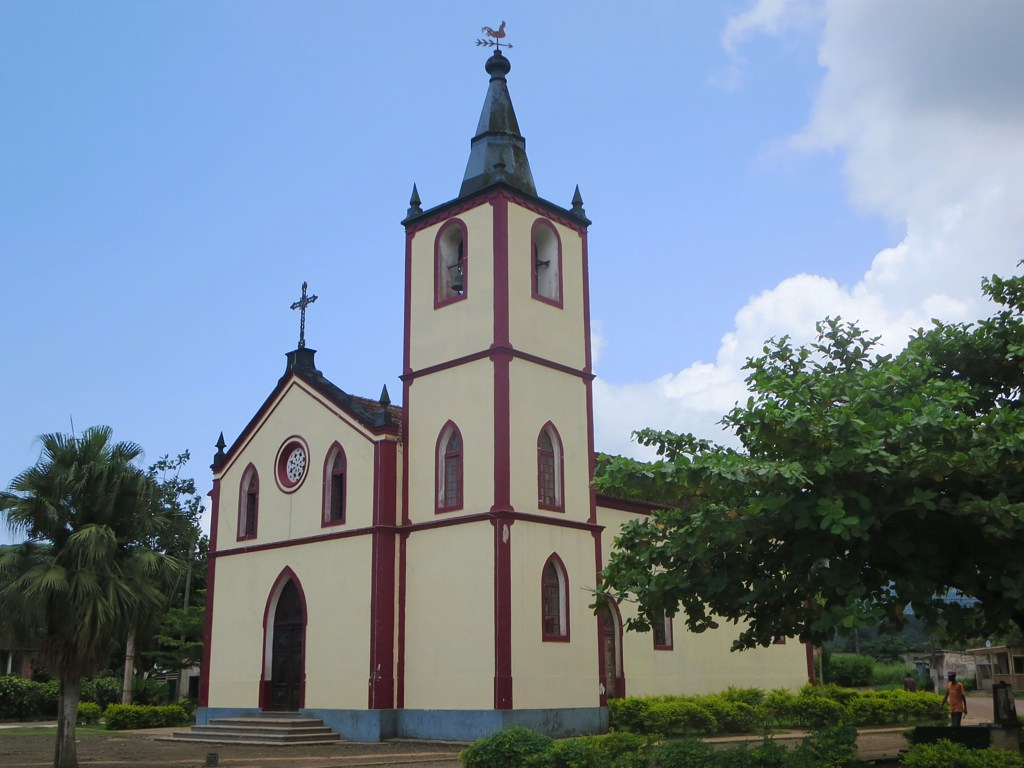
Igreja de Nossa Senhora da Conceição, in Santo António, São Tomé and Príncipe.

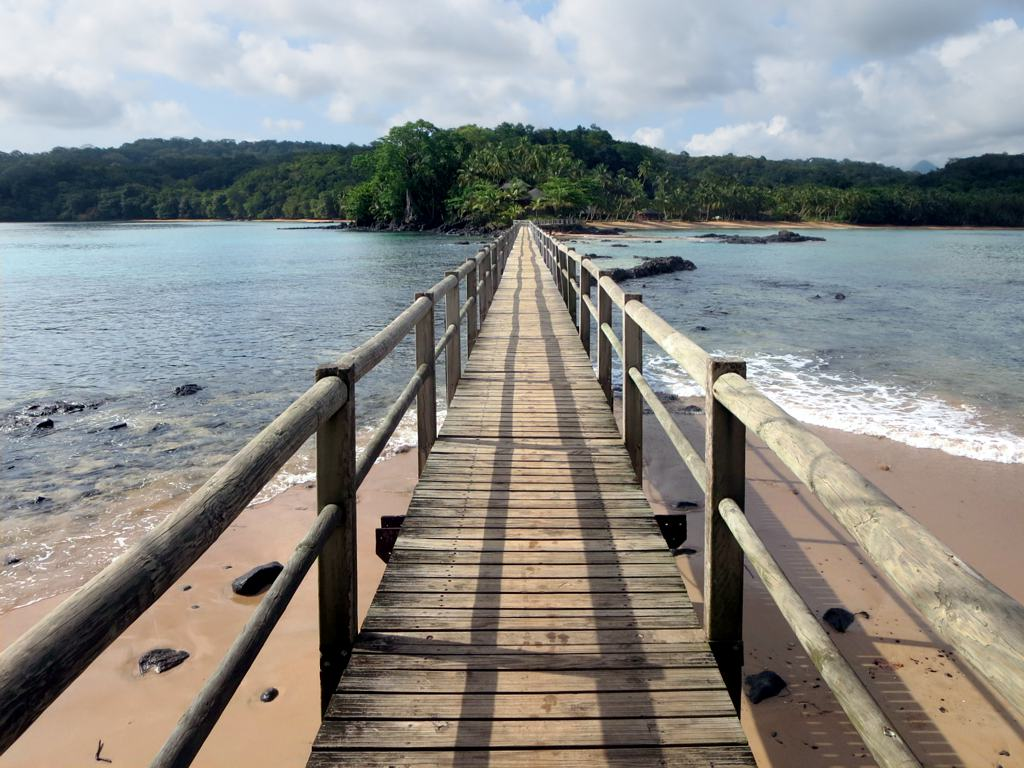
Bom Bom Islet, Príncipe
