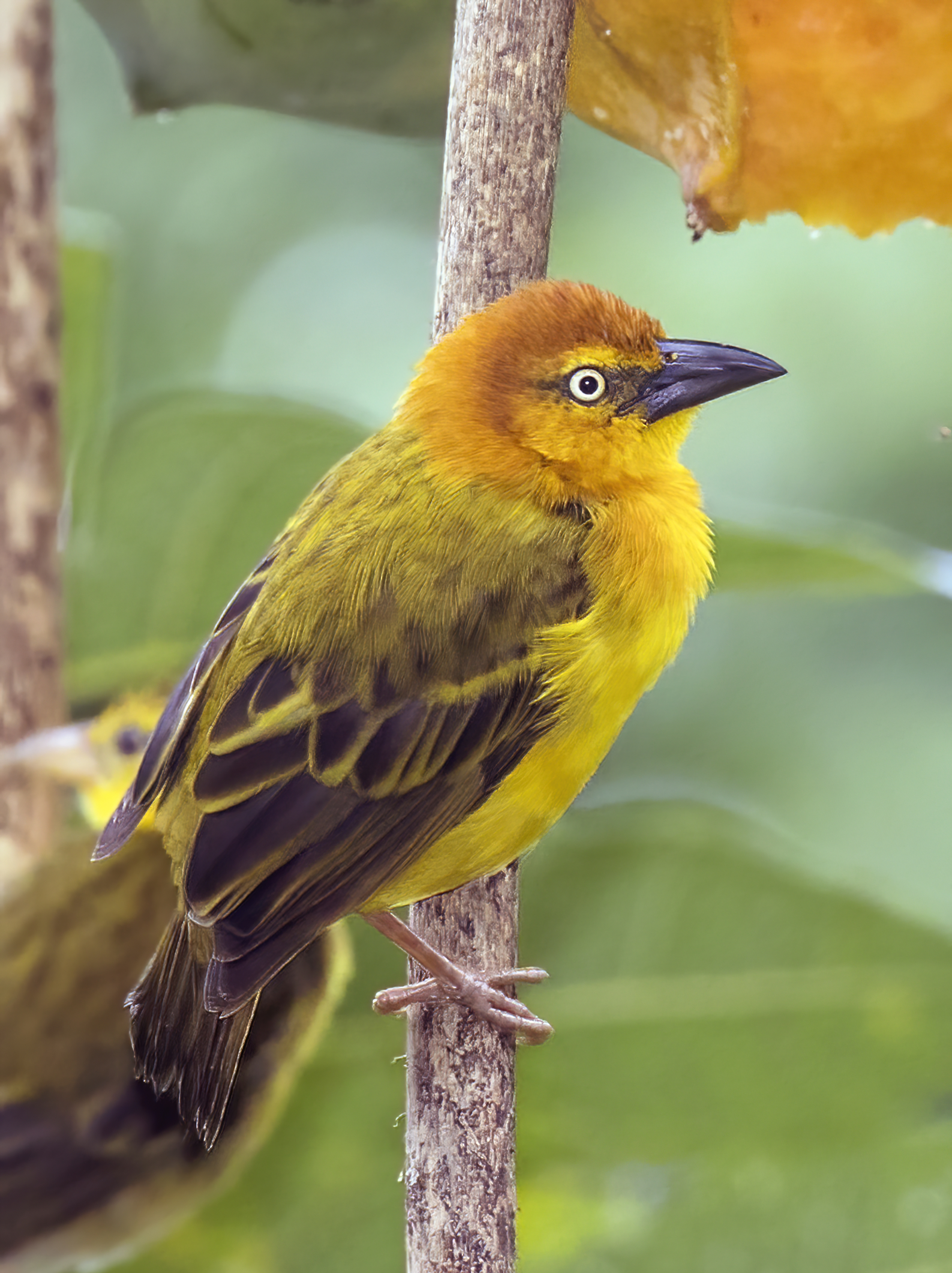
- male
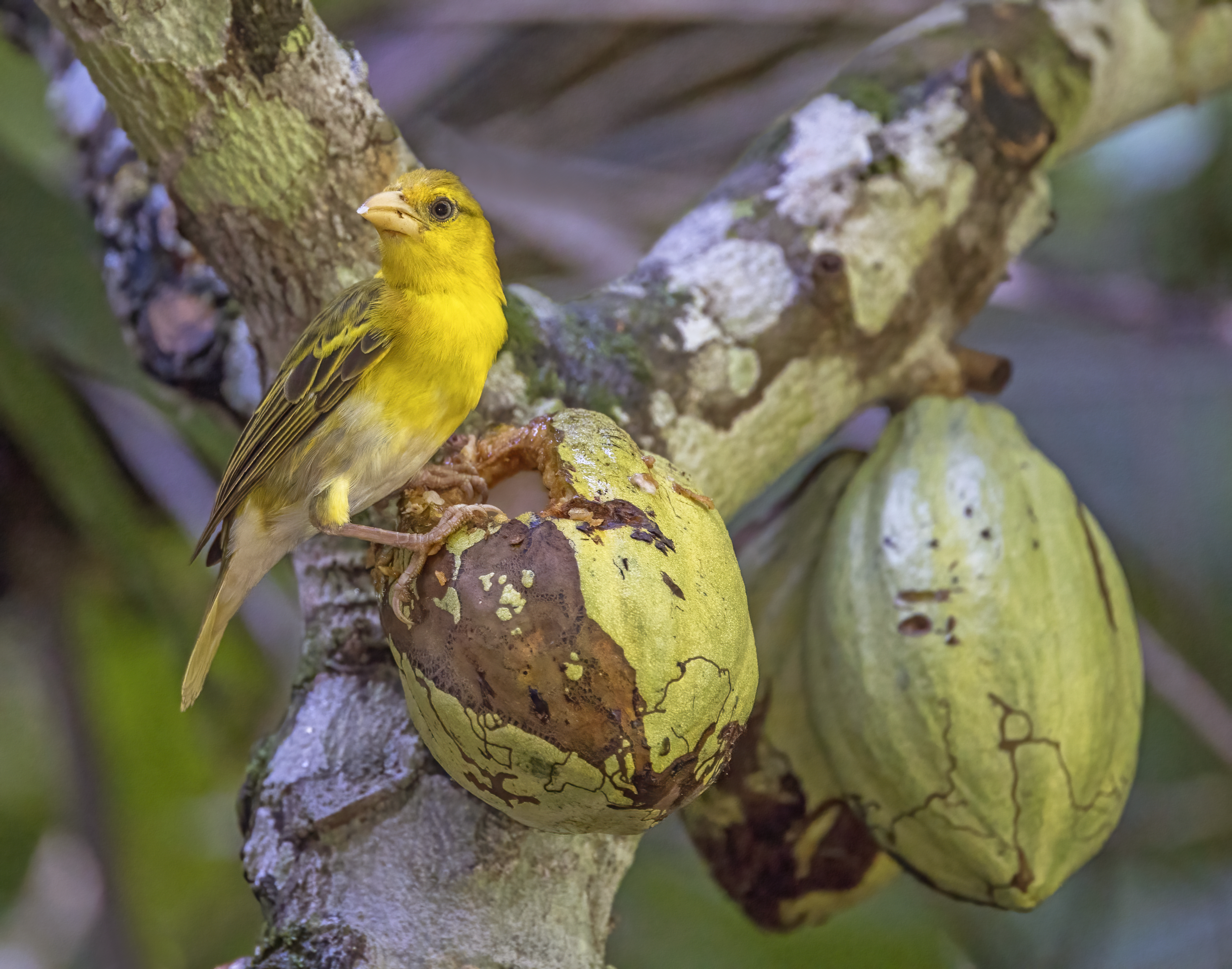
- female both on Principe island, São Tomé and Príncipe

Conservation status
- Least Concern (IUCN 3.1)

Scientific classification
- Kingdom: Animalia
- Phylum: Chordata
- Class: Aves
- Order: Passeriformes
- Family: Ploceidae
- Genus: Ploceus
- Species: P. princeps

Binomial name
- Ploceus princeps (Bonaparte, 1850)
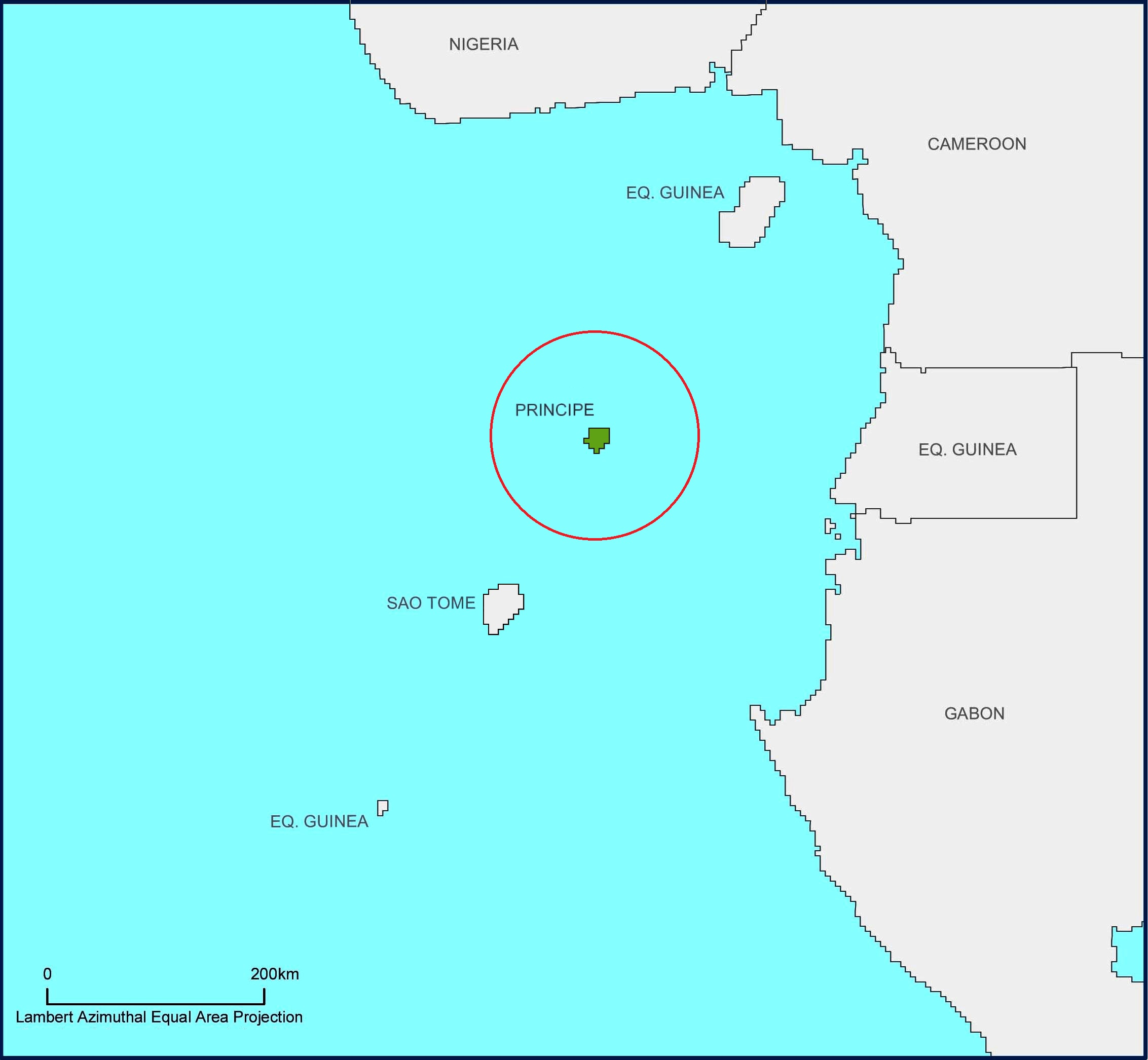
- range

= Príncipe weaver =

Species of bird

The Príncipe weaver (Ploceus princeps) or Principe Golden-weaver is a species of bird in the family Ploceidae. It is endemic to São Tomé and Príncipe, where it is found on the island of Príncipe. It was described by Charles Lucien Bonaparte in 1851. Its natural habitat is subtropical or tropical moist lowland forests.
