= Príncipe white-eye =

Conservation status
- Endangered (IUCN 3.1)

Scientific classification
- Kingdom: Animalia
- Phylum: Chordata
- Class: Aves
- Order: Passeriformes
- Family: Zosteropidae
- Genus: Zosterops
- Species: Z. ficedulinus

Binomial name
- Zosterops ficedulinus Hartlaub, 1866
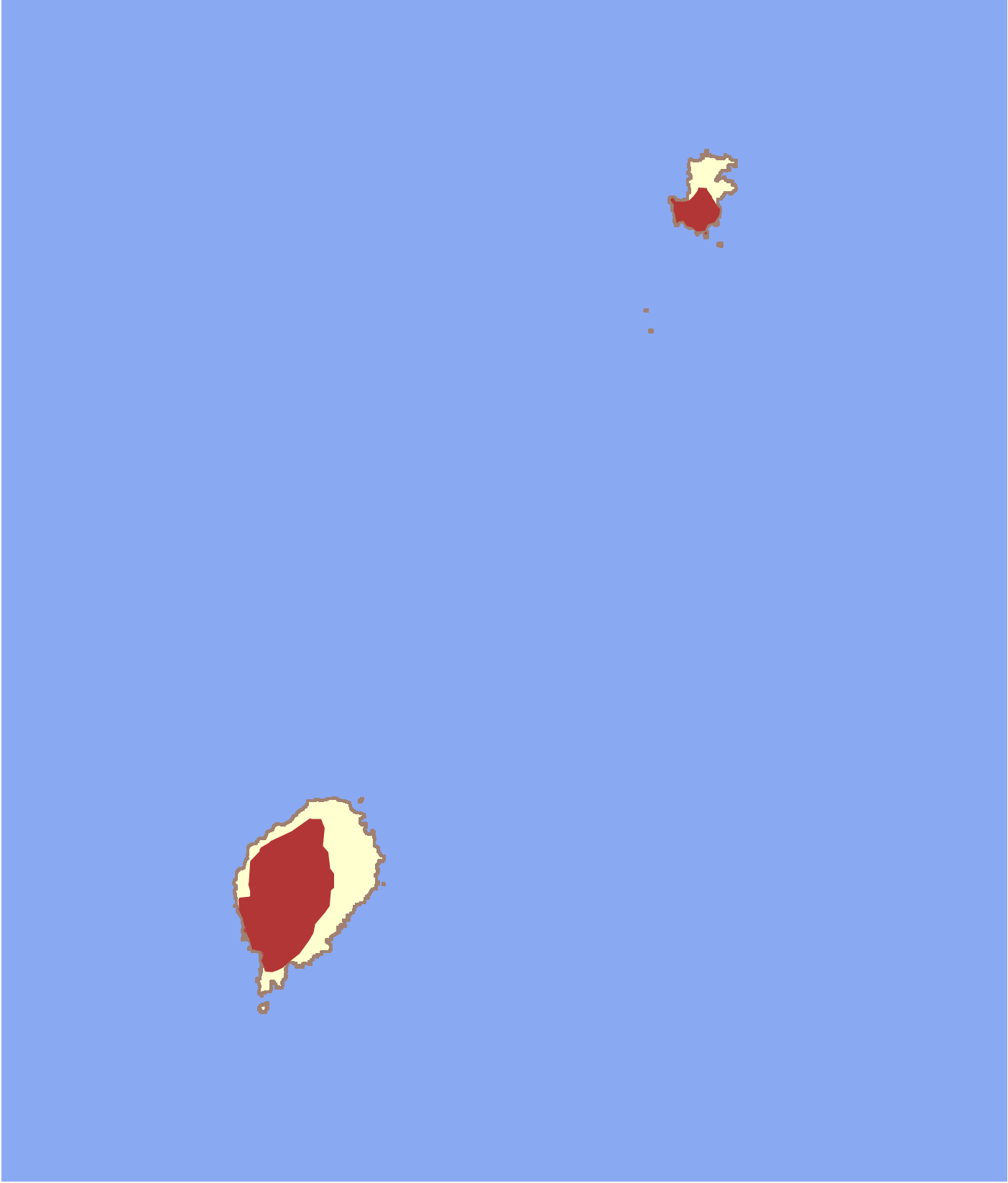
- range in Príncipe (top) and São Tomé

Species of bird

The Príncipe white-eye (Zosterops ficedulinus) is a species of bird in the family Zosteropidae. The species was described by Gustav Hartlaub in 1866. It is endemic to the islands of Príncipe and São Tomé, where it is restricted to the hilly interiors of the southern parts. Its natural habitats are subtropical or tropical moist lowland forests and subtropical or tropical moist montane forests. It is threatened by habitat loss.
