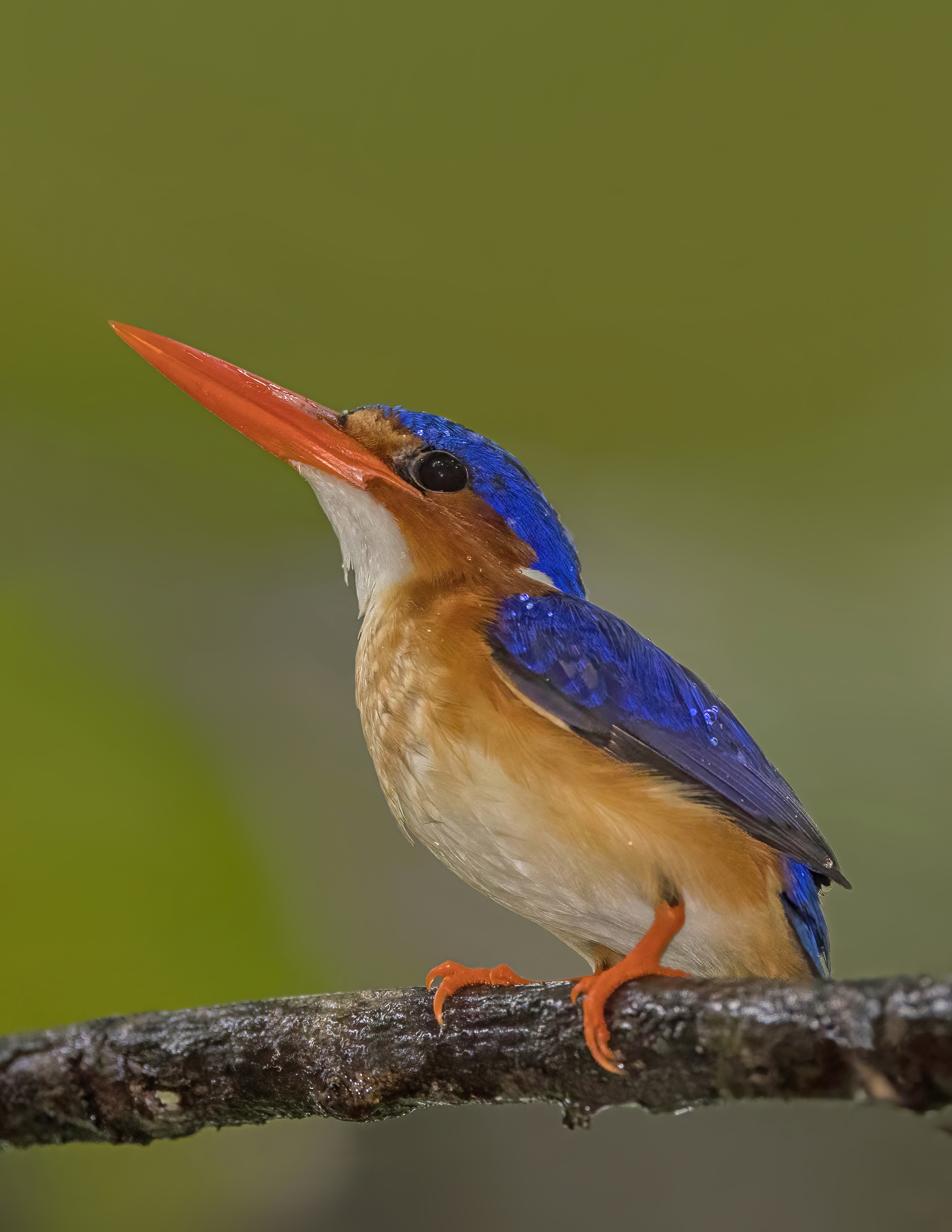

Conservation status
- Least Concern (IUCN 3.1)

Scientific classification
- Kingdom: Animalia
- Phylum: Chordata
- Class: Aves
- Order: Coraciiformes
- Family: Alcedinidae
- Subfamily: Alcedininae
- Genus: Corythornis
- Species: C. cristatus
- Subspecies: C. c. nais

Trinomial name
- Corythornis cristatus nais (Kaup, 1848)
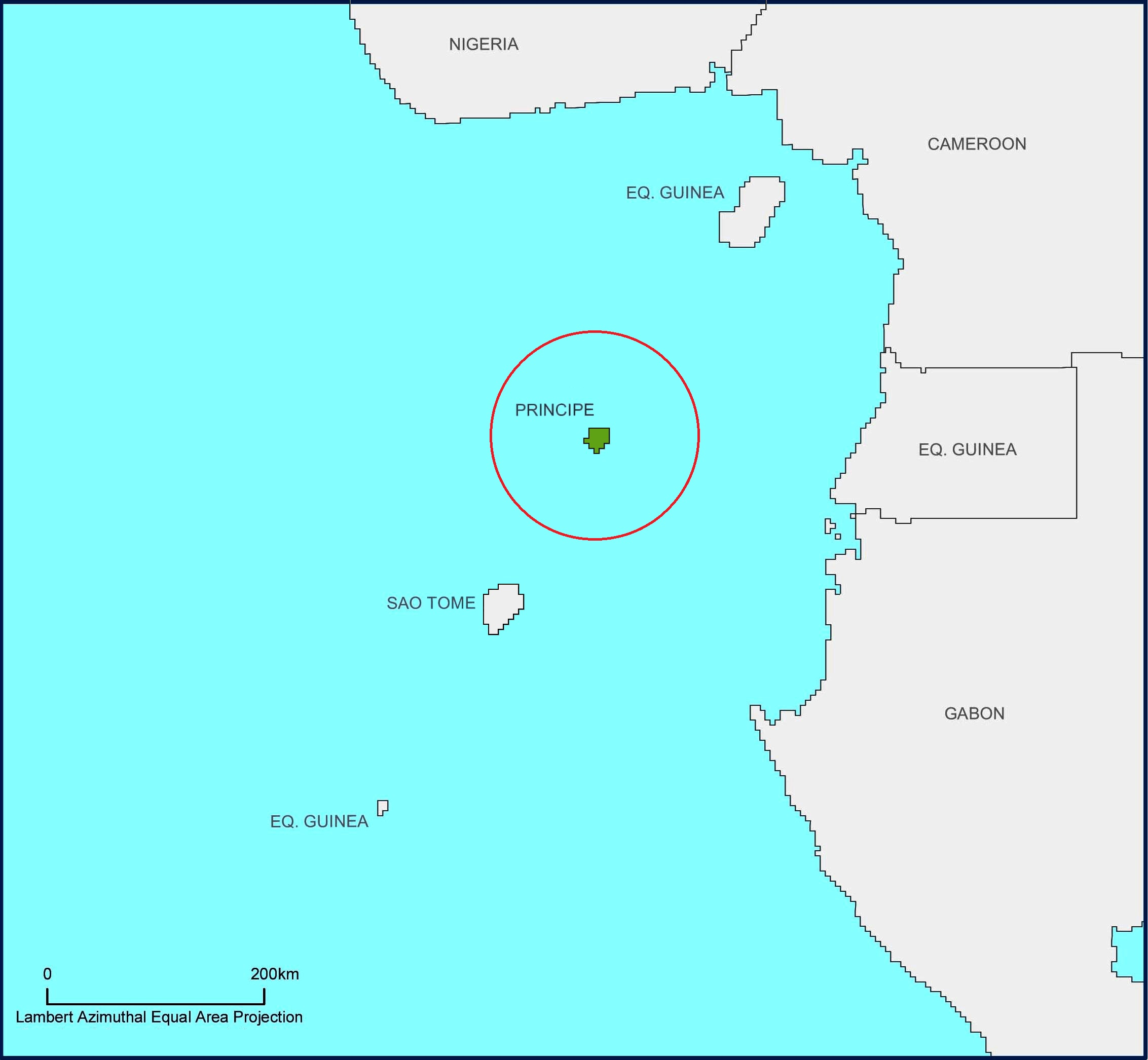
- range

Synonyms
- Alcedo nais; Corythornis nais

= Príncipe kingfisher =

Subspecies of bird

The Príncipe kingfisher (Corythornis cristatus nais) is a bird in the family Alcedinidae. It is endemic to the island of Príncipe off the west coast of Africa in the Gulf of Guinea. The first formal description of the species was by the German naturalist Johann Jakob Kaup in 1848 who gave it the binomial name Alcedo nais. A molecular phylogenetic study published in 2008 showed that the Príncipe kingfisher is a subspecies of the malachite kingfisher.
