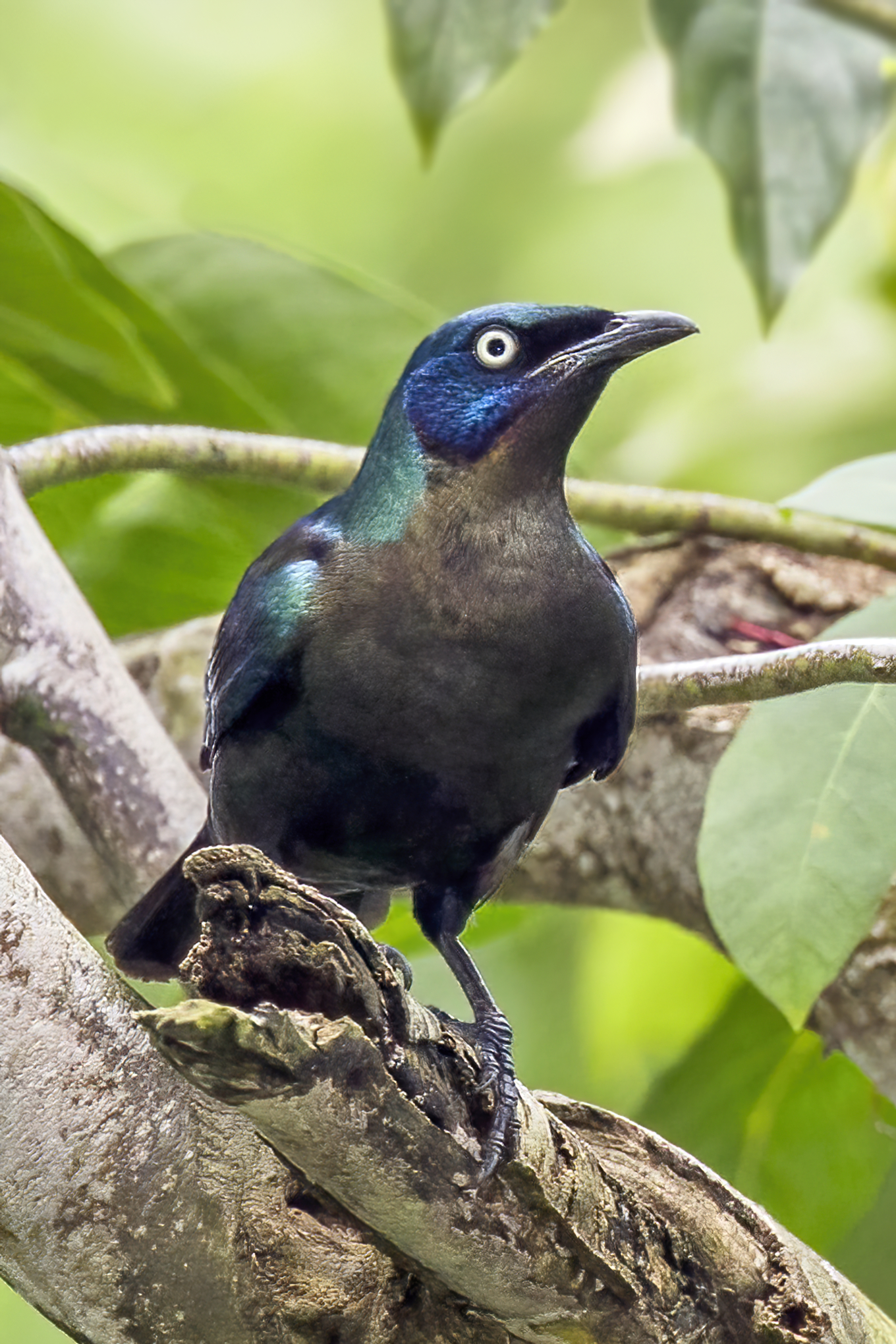
- Principe island, São Tomé and Príncipe

Conservation status
- Least Concern (IUCN 3.1)

Scientific classification
- Kingdom: Animalia
- Phylum: Chordata
- Class: Aves
- Order: Passeriformes
- Family: Sturnidae
- Genus: Lamprotornis
- Species: L. ornatus

Binomial name
- Lamprotornis ornatus (Daudin, 1800)
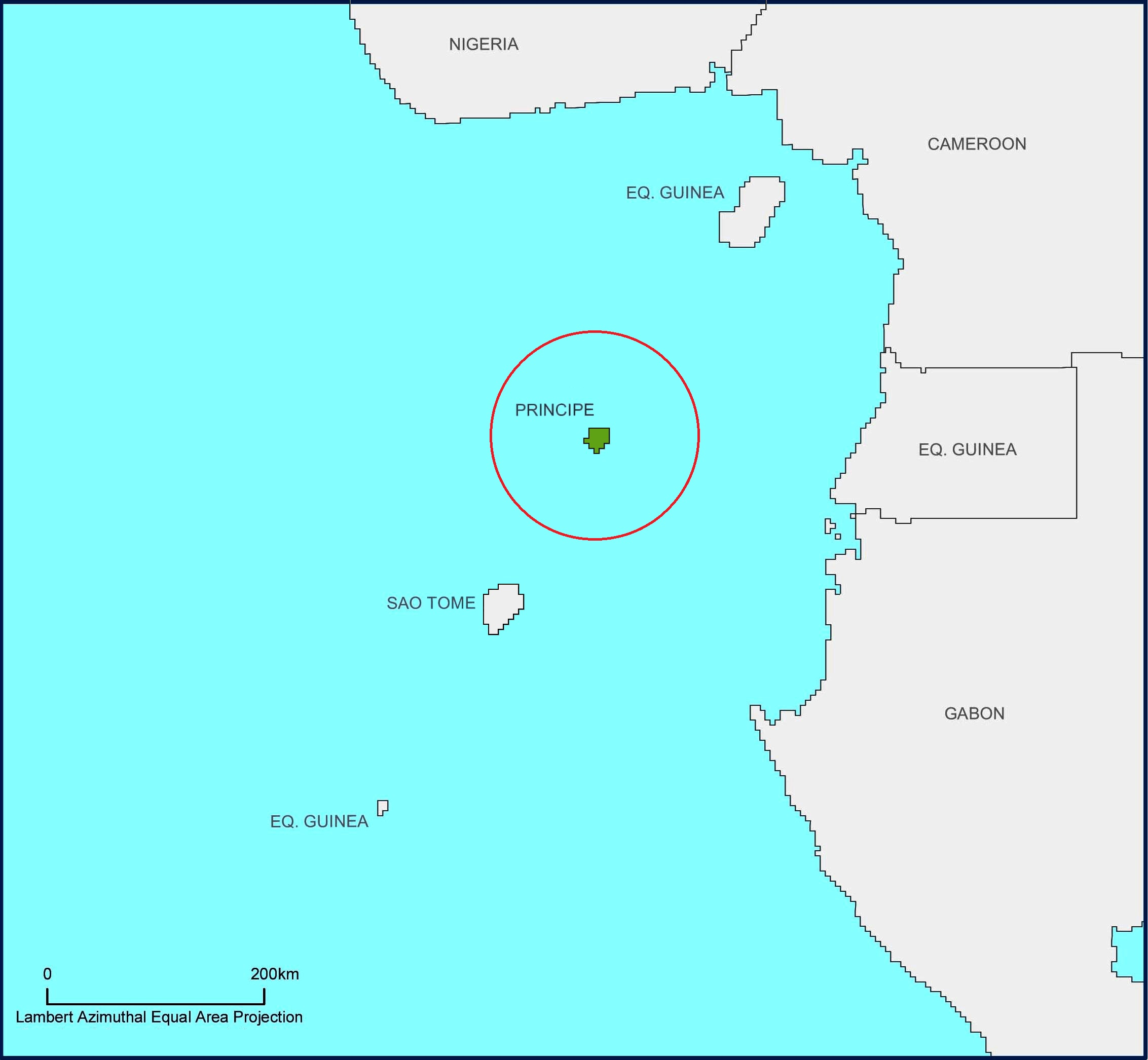
- range

= Principe starling =

Species of bird

The Principe starling (Lamprotornis ornatus), also known as the Príncipe glossy-starling, is a species of starling in the family Sturnidae. It is endemic to São Tomé and Príncipe. Its natural habitat is subtropical or tropical moist lowland forests.

== Gallery ==
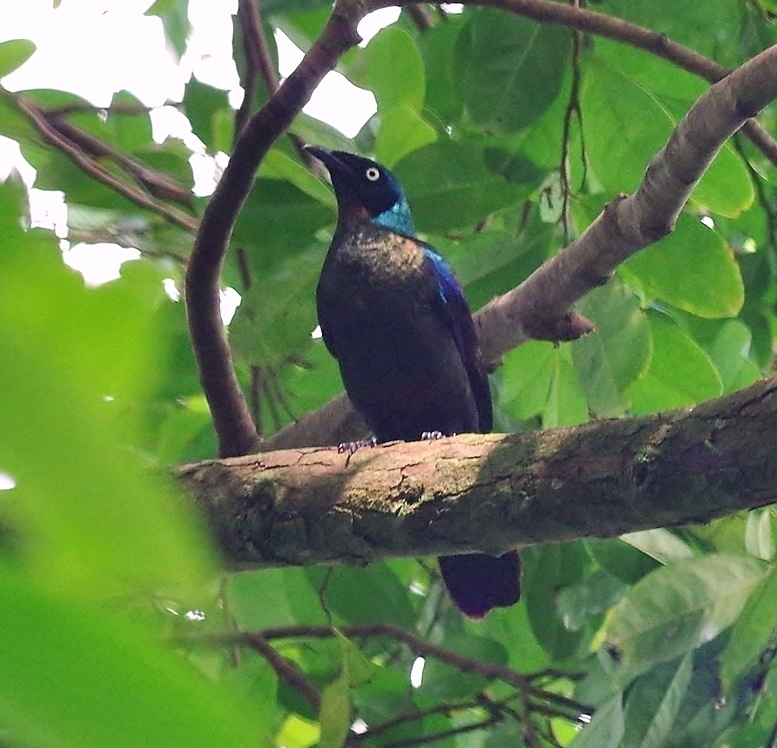
Ventral view of plumage
