= List of cities and towns in São Tomé and Príncipe =

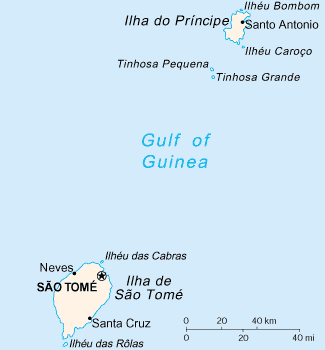
Map of São Tomé and Príncipe

Here is a list of cities and towns in São Tomé and Príncipe. These are villages, towns, and cities with populations over 300. The date of censuses are August 4, 1991, August 25, 2001, and January 1, 2005:

Cities in São Tomé und Príncipe
| Rank | Place | Population | | | District |
| Rank | Place | Census 1991 | Census 2001 | Estimate 2005 | District |
|---|---|---|---|---|---|
| 1. | São Tomé (capital) | 42,331 | 49,957 | 56,166 | Água Grande |
| 2. | Santo Amaro | 5,878 | - | 8,239 | Lobata |
| 3. | Neves | 5,919 | 6,635 | 7,392 | Lembá |
| 4. | Santana | 6,190 | 6,228 | 6,969 | Cantagalo |
| 5. | Trindade | - | 6,049 | 6,636 | Mé-Zóchi |
| 6. | Santa Cruz | - | 1,862 | 2,045 | Caué |
| 7. | Pantufo | - | 1,929 | 2,169 | Água Grande |
| 8. | Guadalupe | - | 1,543 | 1,734 | Lobata |
| 9. | Santo António | 1,000 | 1,010 | 1,156 | Pagué |
| 10. | Santa Catarina | - | - | 971 | Lembá |
| 11. | Porto Alegre | - | - | 334 | Caué |

== Others ==
- Bom Successo
- Ribeira Afonso
- São João dos Angolares
