= List of massacres in São Tomé and Príncipe =

The following is a list of massacres that have occurred in São Tomé and Príncipe (numbers may be approximate):

Name	Date	Location	Deaths	Notes
Batepá massacre	February 3, 1953	Batepá, Mé-Zóchi District, São Tomé Province	1000+	Portuguese colonial authorities slaughtered thousands of Creole civilians. The Portuguese government justified it by portraying it as a crackdown on communists.
