= List of airports in São Tomé and Príncipe =

This is a list of airports in São Tomé and Príncipe, sorted by location.

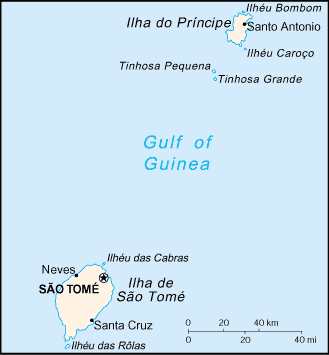
São Tomé and Príncipe

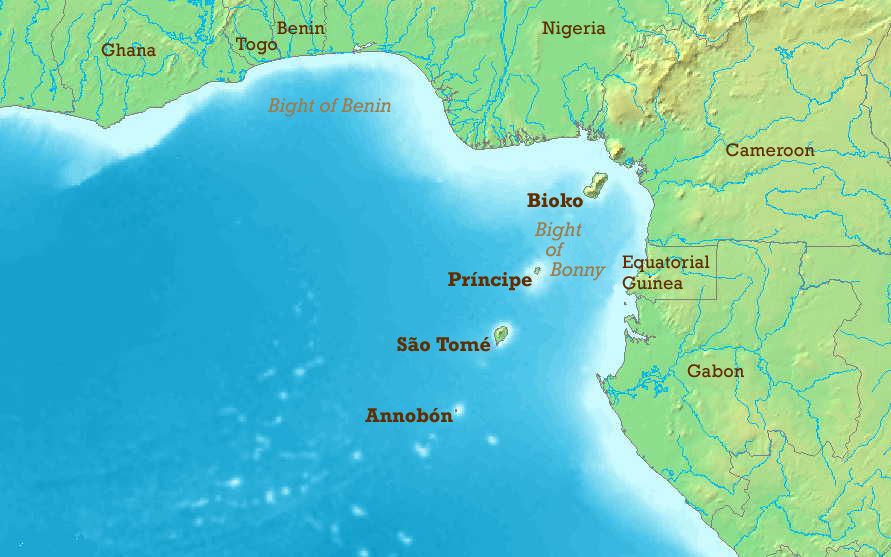
Location of islands in the Gulf of Guinea

São Tomé and Príncipe, officially the Democratic Republic of São Tomé and Príncipe, is a Portuguese-speaking island nation in the Gulf of Guinea, off the western equatorial coast of Africa. It consists of two islands: São Tomé and Príncipe, located about 140 kilometres (87 mi) apart and about 250 and 225 kilometres (155 and 140 mi), respectively, off the northwestern coast of Gabon. São Tomé and Príncipe are located between the islands of Annobón and Bioko, both part of Equatorial Guinea. The nation is divided into seven districts, six on São Tomé and one on Príncipe. Its capital is the city of São Tomé.

== Airports ==
City/town served	Island	ICAO	IATA	Airport name	Coordinates
Porto Alegre	São Tomé	FPPA	PGP	Porto Alegre Airport	00°02′N 006°31′E
Santo António	Príncipe	FPPR	PCP	Príncipe Airport	01°39′46″N 007°24′42″E
São Tomé	São Tomé	FPST	TMS	São Tomé International Airport	00°22′41″N 006°42′44″E

== See also ==
- Transport in São Tomé and Príncipe
- List of airports by ICAO code: F#FP - São Tomé and Príncipe
- Wikipedia: WikiProject Aviation/Airline destination lists: Africa#São Tomé and Príncipe
