= Districts of São Tomé and Príncipe =

Districts of São Tomé and Príncipe

São Tomé and Príncipe is divided into seven administrative districts since 1980. Six are located on the main island of São Tomé while one (Pagué) covers the smaller island of Príncipe. Since 1995, the Pagué District has been replaced by the Autonomous Region of Príncipe.

Map Key	District	Capital	Area (km^{2})	Population (2012 census)	Population (2018 estimate)
1	Água Grande	São Tomé	16.5	69,772	77,700
2	Cantagalo	Santana	119.0	17,169	19,400
3	Caué	São João dos Angolares	267.0	6,062	7,200
4	Lembá	Neves	229.5	14,676	16,300
5	Lobata	Guadalupe	105.0	19,414	22,000
6	Mé-Zóchi	Trindade	122.0	44,763	50,800
7	Pagué (Autonomous Region of Príncipe)	Santo António	142.0	7,344	8,420

== See also ==
- List of cities and towns in São Tomé and Príncipe
