= Ototó =

- Village
- Location on São Tomé Island
- Coordinates: 0.3182°N 6.6630°E
- Country: São Tomé and Príncipe
- Island: São Tomé
- District: Mé-Zóchi

Population (2012)
  - Total: 491
- Time zone: UTC+1 (WAT)

Ototó is a village in the central part of São Tomé Island in São Tomé and Príncipe. Its population is 585 (2012 census). It lies 1 km southeast of Santa Margarida and 1.2 km south of Madalena.

== Population history ==
Historical population
Year	Pop.	±%
2001	431	—
2008	491	+13.9%
2012	585	+19.1%
