= Bombaim =

- Village
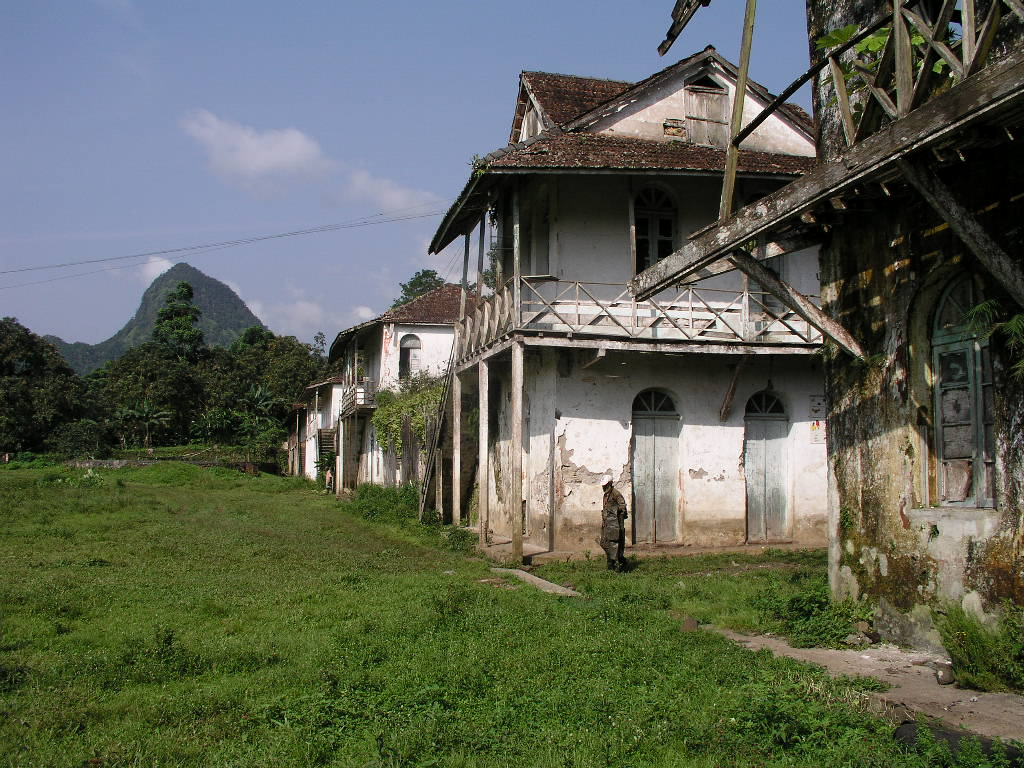
- Roça Bombaim

- Location on São Tomé Island
- Coordinates: 0.2460°N 6.6327°E
- Country: São Tomé and Príncipe
- Island: São Tomé
- District: Mé-Zóchi

Population (2012)
  - Total: 18
- Time zone: UTC+1 (WAT)

Bombaim is a small village on São Tomé Island in São Tomé and Príncipe. Its population is 18 (2012 census). It is 6 km south of Monte Café and 8 km southwest of Trindade. It was established as a plantation (roça).

== Population history ==
Historical population
Year	Pop.	±%
2001	30	—
2008	34	+13.3%
2012	18	−47.1%
