= Piedade, São Tomé and Príncipe =

Piedade
- Village
- Location on São Tomé Island
- Coordinates: 0.2958°N 6.6644°E
- Country: São Tomé and Príncipe
- Island: São Tomé
- District: Mé-Zóchi

Population (2012)
  - Total: 1,408
- Time zone: UTC+1 (WAT)

Piedade is a village on São Tomé Island in São Tomé and Príncipe. Its population is 1,408 (2012 census). It lies directly southeast of Batepá and 2 km west of Trindade. The agricultural school Centro de Aperfeiçoamento Técnico Agro-Pecuário (CATAP) is located in Piedade.

== Population history ==
Historical population
| Year | Pop. | ±% |
|---|---|---|
| 2001 | 1,392 | — |
| 2008 | 1,587 | +14.0% |
| 2012 | 1,408 | −11.3% |
