= Praia Messias Alves =

- Location on São Tomé Island
- Coordinates: 0.247°N 6.7427°E
- Country: São Tomé and Príncipe
- Island: São Tomé
- District: Cantagalo

Population (2012)
  - Total: 466
- Time zone: UTC+1 (WAT)

Praia Messias Alves is a settlement in Cantagalo District, São Tomé Island in the nation of São Tomé and Príncipe. Its population is 466 (2012 census). It lies on the coast, 1.2 km south of Santana and 0.5 km east of Picão Flor.

== Population history ==
Historical population
Year	Pop.	±%
2001	513	—
2008	585	+14.0%
2012	466	−20.3%
