= São Nicolau, São Tomé and Príncipe =

São Nicolau
- Village
- Location on São Tomé Island
- Coordinates: 0.2798°N 6.6255°E
- Country: São Tomé and Príncipe
- Island: São Tomé
- District: Mé-Zóchi

Population (2012)
  - Total: 118
- Time zone: UTC+1 (WAT)

São Nicolau is a village in the central part of São Tomé Island in São Tomé and Príncipe. Its population is 118 (2012 census). It lies in a mountainous area, 3 km southwest of Monte Café.

== Population history ==
Historical population
Year	Pop.	±%
2001	88	—
2008	100	+13.6%
2012	118	+18.0%
