= Diogo Simão =

- Location on São Tomé Island
- Coordinates: 0.3151°N 6.6948°E
- Country: São Tomé and Príncipe
- Island: São Tomé
- District: Mé-Zóchi

Population (2012)
  - Total: 600
- Time zone: UTC+1 (WAT)

Diogo Simão is a village in Mé-Zóchi District, São Tomé and Príncipe. Its population is 600 (2012 census). It lies 1.5 km southwest of Bobo Forro and 2.5 km northeast of Trindade.

== Population history ==
Historical population
Year	Pop.	±%
2001	369	—
2008	421	+14.1%
2012	600	+42.5%
