= Quinta da Graça =

- Location on São Tomé Island
- Coordinates: 0.2998°N 6.6435°E
- Country: São Tomé and Príncipe
- Island: São Tomé
- District: Mé-Zóchi

Population (2012)
  - Total: 58
- Time zone: UTC+1 (WAT)

Quinta da Graça is a village on São Tomé Island in São Tomé and Príncipe. Its population is 58 (2012 census). It lies directly east of Monte Café, 2 km west of Batepá.

== Population history ==
Historical population
Year	Pop.	±%
2001	86	—
2008	98	+14.0%
2012	58	−40.8%
