= Nova Olinda =

Nova Olinda may refer to:

- Nova Olinda, São Tomé and Príncipe
- Nova Olinda do Norte, Amazonas, Brazil
- Nova Olinda, Paraíba, Brazil
- Nova Olinda do Maranhão, Brazil
- Nova Olinda, Ceará, Brazil
