= Caminho Novo, São Tomé and Príncipe =

Caminho Novo
- Village
- Location on São Tomé Island
- Coordinates: 0.3074°N 6.7308°E
- Country: São Tomé and Príncipe
- Island: São Tomé
- District: Mé-Zóchi

Population (2012)
  - Total: 1,256
- Time zone: UTC+1 (WAT)

Caminho Novo is a village in the north-eastern part of São Tomé Island in São Tomé and Príncipe. Its population is 1,256 (2012 census). It lies in the eastern part of the Mé-Zóchi District, adjacent to the town Bombom, 3.5 km south of the capital São Tomé.

== Population history ==
Historical population
Year	Pop.	±%
2001	2,068	—
2008	2,357	+14.0%
2012	1,256	−46.7%
