= Guegue =

- Village
- Location on São Tomé Island
- Coordinates: 0°16′20″N 6°42′30″E
- Country: São Tomé and Príncipe
- Island: São Tomé
- District: Cantagalo

Population (2012)
  - Total: 104
- Time zone: UTC+1 (WAT)

Guegue is a village on São Tomé Island in the nation of São Tomé and Príncipe. Its population is 104 (2012 census). It lies in the interior of the island, 1 km north of Uba Budo and 4 km southeast of Trindade.
