= Cidade Alta =

- Interactive map of Cidade Alta
- Coordinates: 0.2596°N 6.7401°E
- Country: São Tomé and Príncipe
- Island: São Tomé
- District: Cantagalo

Population (2012)
  - Total: 212
- Time zone: UTC+1 (WAT)

Cidade Alta is a settlement in Cantagalo District, São Tomé Island in the nation of São Tomé and Príncipe. Its population is 212 (2012 census). It lies directly northwest of Santana.

== Population history ==
Historical population
Year	Pop.	±%
2001	429	—
2008	489	+14.0%
2012	212	−56.6%
