= Zandrigo =

- Location on São Tomé Island
- Coordinates: 0.2559°N 6.7373°E
- Country: São Tomé and Príncipe
- Island: São Tomé
- District: Cantagalo

Population (2012)
  - Total: 765
- Time zone: UTC+1 (WAT)

Zandrigo is a settlement in Cantagalo District, São Tomé Island in the nation of São Tomé and Príncipe. Its population is 765 (2012 census). It lies directly west of Santana.

== Population history ==
Historical population
Year	Pop.	±%
2001	982	—
2008	1,119	+14.0%
2012	765	−31.6%
