= Santa Cruz, São Tomé and Príncipe =

Santa Cruz
- Location on São Tomé Island
- Coordinates: 0°20′0″N 6°39′30″E
- Country: São Tomé and Príncipe
- Island: São Tomé
- District: Mé-Zóchi

Population (2012)
  - Total: 191
- Time zone: UTC+1 (WAT)

Santa Cruz is a village on São Tomé Island in the nation of São Tomé and Príncipe. Its population is 191 (2012 census). It lies 1 km north of Santa Margarida and 1 km west of Madalena.
