= Almas, São Tomé and Príncipe =

Almas
- Village
- Location on São Tomé Island
- Coordinates: 0.2988°N 6.744°E
- Country: São Tomé and Príncipe
- Island: São Tomé
- District: Mé-Zóchi

Population (2012)
  - Total: 1,255
- Time zone: UTC+1 (WAT)

Almas is a town in Mé-Zóchi District, São Tomé Island, São Tomé and Príncipe. Its population is 1,255 (2012 census). It lies 1 km southwest of Praia Melão and 5 km south of the capital São Tomé.

== Population history ==
Historical population
Year	Pop.	±%
2001	921	—
2008	1,050	+14.0%
2012	1,255	+19.5%
