= Begonia molleri =

Scientific classification
- Kingdom: Plantae
- Clade: Tracheophytes
- Clade: Angiosperms
- Clade: Eudicots
- Clade: Rosids
- Order: Cucurbitales
- Family: Begoniaceae
- Genus: Begonia
- Species: B. molleri

Binomial name
- Begonia molleri (C.DC.) Warb.

Species of flowering plant

Begonia molleri is a species of flowering plant in the family Begoniaceae native to São Tomé, with a local distribution between Monte Café and the Pico, Nova Moka (altitude 850 m). It is notable for its "sausage-shaped", wingless fruit.

B. molleri is an epiphyte with a trailing-scandent growth habit, possibly tolerant of deep-shade. It has succulent leaves, which helps the plant conserve water at increased altitudes where humidity is lower.

It was described in 1892 under the basionym Mezierea molleri by Casimir de Candolle, and was later reclassified into the genus Begonia in 1894 by Otto Warburg. The specific epithet molleri means "of Moller", in honor of Adolpho Frederico Moller, who collected the type specimens on the island of São Tomé in 1885.
