= Cruzeiro, São Tomé and Príncipe =

Cruzeiro
- Town
- Location on São Tomé Island
- Coordinates: 0.2905°N 6.6807°E
- Country: São Tomé and Príncipe
- Island: São Tomé
- District: Mé-Zóchi District

Population (2012)
  - Total: 1,716
- Time zone: UTC+1 (WAT)

Cruzeiro is a village located in the middle of Mé-Zóchi District, on São Tomé Island, which is part of the island nation of São Tomé and Príncipe. Its population is 1,716 (2012 census). It lies directly to the south of Trindade.

== Population history ==
Historical population
Year	Pop.	±%
2001	1,185	—
2008	1,351	+14.0%
2012	1,716	+27.0%

== Notable person ==
- Francisco Fortunato Pires, National Assembly member from 1994 to 2002
