= Praia Melão =

- Village
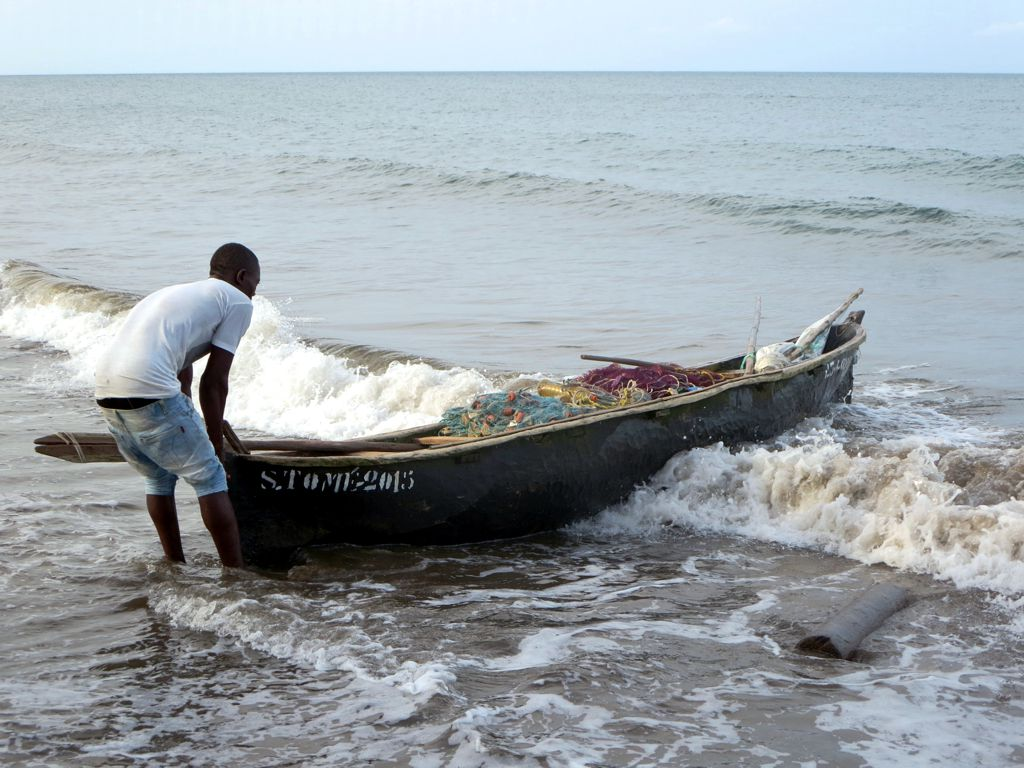
- A fisherman and his canoe at Praia Melão

- Location on São Tomé Island
- Coordinates: 0.304°N 6.7506°E
- Country: São Tomé and Príncipe
- Island: São Tomé
- District: Mé-Zóchi

Population (2012)
  - Total: 2,668
- Time zone: UTC+1 (WAT)

Praia Melão is a seaside village in the north-eastern part of São Tomé Island in São Tomé and Príncipe, part of Mé-Zóchi District. Its population is 2,668 (2012 census). It lies 1 km northeast of Almas, 1 km southeast of Pantufo and 4.5 km southeast of the capital São Tomé.

== Population history ==
Historical population
Year	Pop.	±%
2001	2,014	—
2008	2,296	+14.0%
2012	2,668	+16.2%
