= Ilhéu de Santana =

Coordinates: 0°14′30″N 6°45′35″E

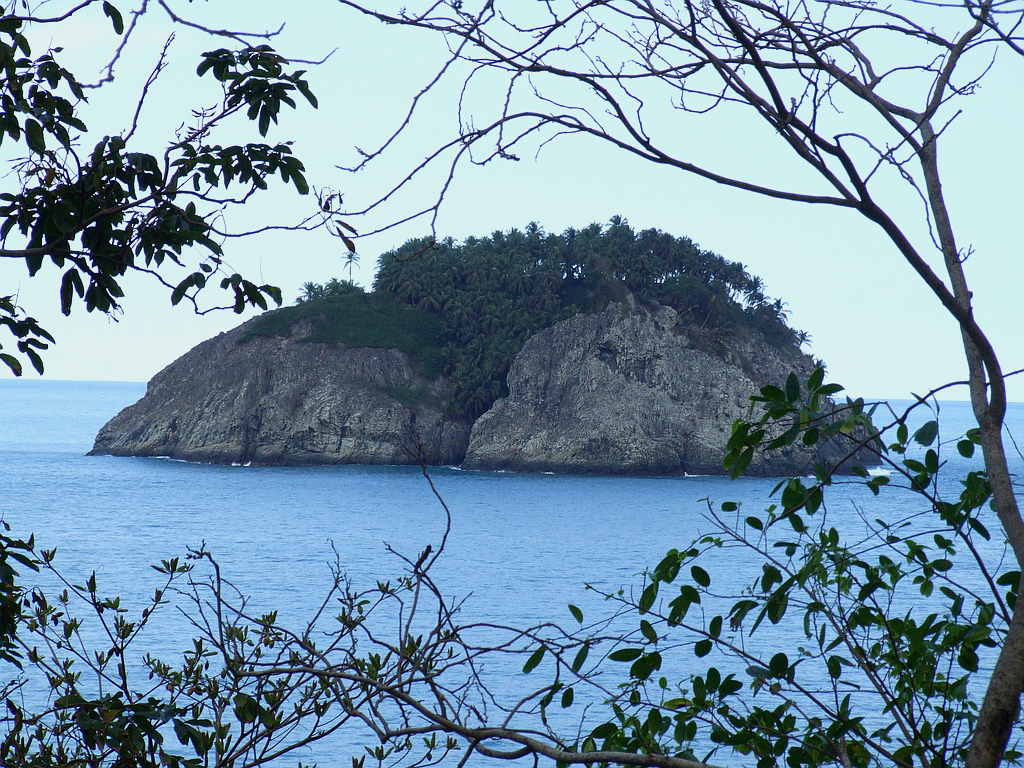
- Ilhéu de Santana, seen from São Tomé Island

Geography
- Location: east of São Tomé near the town of Santana
- Highest elevation: 50 m (160 ft)

Administration
- São Tomé and Príncipe

Demographics
- Population: 0

Ilhéu de Santana is an uninhabited islet in the Gulf of Guinea and is one of the smaller islands of São Tomé and Príncipe. The islet is located 0.7 nmi (1.3 km) off the east coast of the island of São Tomé near the town of Santana in Cantagalo District. It is 50 metres high. The islet was mentioned in the 1616 map by Jodocus Hondius as I. de S. Anne.
