= Plateaux Department =

Plateaux Department may refer to:

- Plateaux Department (Gabon)
- Plateaux Department (Republic of the Congo)

== See also ==
- Plateau Department
- Plateau (disambiguation)
