= Centro de Aperfeiçoamento Técnico Agro-Pecuário =

Agricultural training centre in São Tomé and Príncipe

- Established: 1988
- Location: Piedade, São Tomé and Príncipe; 0°17′45″N 6°39′50″E
- Location within São Tomé

Centro de Aperfeiçoamento Técnico Agro-Pecuário (CATAP, Portuguese for: "Centre for technical improvement of agriculture and animal husbandry") is an agricultural training centre in São Tomé and Príncipe. It is located the village of Piedade, Mé-Zóchi District. It was established in 1988 by the Italian NGO Nuova Frontiera, with support from the European Union, the Republic of São Tomé and Príncipe, the World Food Programme and the Canada Fund for Local Initiatives.
