= Plateau, São Tomé and Príncipe =

Plateau
- Location on São Tomé Island
- Coordinates: 0.2689°N 6.6554°E
- Country: São Tomé and Príncipe
- Island: São Tomé
- District: Mé-Zóchi

Population (2012)
  - Total: 99
- Time zone: UTC+1 (WAT)

Plateau is a village on São Tomé Island in the nation of São Tomé and Príncipe. Its population was 99 according to the 2012 census. It lies one kilometer northeast of Java and four kilometers southwest of Trindade.

== Population history ==
Historical population
Year	Pop.	±%
2001	133	—
2008	152	+14.3%
2012	99	−34.9%
