= Batepá massacre =

1953 killing of native creoles in colonial São Tomé

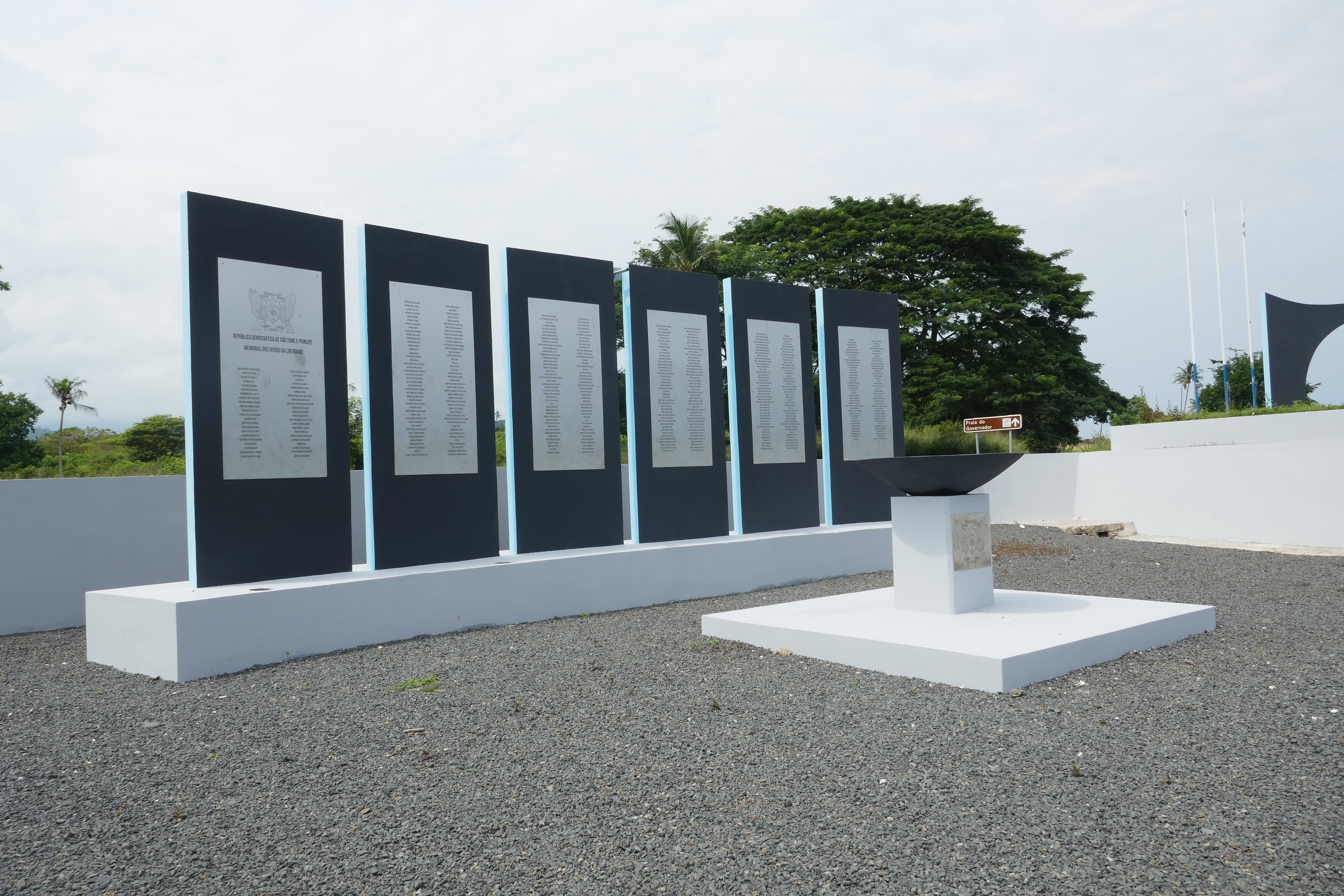
- Monument of the massacre, erected in 2015 on the beach of Fernão Dias, São Tomé at 0°24′39″N 6°40′3″E.
- Date: 3 February 1953
- Location: Batepá, Mé-Zóchi District, São Tomé Island; 0.30°N 6.66°E
- Result: Protests repelled; beginning of nationalist sentiment

Parties
Santomean creoles	Portuguese landowners

Lead figures
?	Carlos Gorgulho

Casualties and losses
Hundreds killed	2 police officers killed

The Batepá massacre occurred on 3 February 1953 in colonial São Tomé when hundreds of native creoles known as forros were massacred by the colonial administration and Portuguese landowners. Many forros believed the government intended to force them to work as contract laborers, to which they objected. In response, the governor blamed the unrest on communists and ordered the military to round up such individuals and for civilians to protect themselves. This quickly turned into a bloodbath, resulting in the deaths of hundreds of forros. No communist conspiracy was ever proven.

== Background ==
Carlos Gorgulho assumed office as governor in 1945. At the time São Tomé Island was one of the world's largest producers of cocoa. Large plantations, called roças, occupied the majority of the island's farmland. The roças operated as a quasi-feudal system using contract laborers (serviçais) from mainland Africa and Cape Verde. The forros had always refused manual field work on the estates, since they considered it slave labor. In Gorgulho's assessment the economic modernization policies of the Portuguese Estado Novo regime required breaking São Tomé's dependence on contract laborers from overseas. To accomplish this Gorgulho implemented policies to make it easier for serviçais to return home while at the same time improving conditions on the roças, which he hoped would attract local labor. He also introduced measures targeting the livelihood of the forros such as prohibiting the sale of palm wine and the locally produced gin and raising the poll tax from 30 to 90 escudos; Gorgulho believed these measures would result in the forros taking up wage labor on the roças.

Gorgulho also faced a shortage of labor to carry out his public works and construction projects. The colonial administration used police raids to kidnap people for forced labor gangs to carry out much of this work.

== The crisis ==
Faced with widespread labor shortages, in 1952 the colonial administration proposed settling fifteen thousand people from Cape Verde on São Tomé; then in January 1953 rumors spread that the government would seize the land of the forros to give to newly arrived Cape Verdians and compel the forros to work as contract labor. On February 2, 1953, hand-written pamphlets appeared in São Tomé threatening to kill anyone who contracted forros as laborers. The government responded with an official declaration: "The government has been informed that individuals who are hostile towards the present policy, known as communists, are spreading tendentious rumors to the effect that the creoles are to be obliged to contract themselves for the work on the roças like serviçais. The government declares that no creole should give credit to these rumors, but should report such individuals to the police. Thus, the government which has the obligation to protect the creoles, as it has always demonstrated, guarantees them that it will never agree to authorize such contracts." Crowds of protestors gathered on February 3 and the police killed one of them, Manuel da Conceição Soares. His death precipitated a large protest in Trindade the following day.

== The massacres ==
Gorgulho informed colonists and the administration that a communist rebellion was in the offing and he issued a call for all white colonists to take up arms to protect themselves and white women. Militias were quickly formed and some Cape Verdians responded to the call-to-arms. In addition, planters mobilized Angolan and Mozambican workers. Over the next few days the militias and colonial government killed hundreds of forros. Twenty-eight people were suffocated in a cell by the local police, the Corpo de Polícia Indígena (CPI, Indigenous Police Corps); on one estate, twenty people were burned to death. The authorities subjected prisoners to torture using electricity and scores of prisoners died as a result of torture, beatings, and forced labor. The authorities dumped many bodies into the sea. "Throw this shit into the sea to avoid troubles," Gorgulho is quoted as advising.

== Aftermath ==
On March 4 members of the Portuguese International and State Defense Police arrived to conduct an investigation into the alleged communist conspiracy. They quickly concluded there was no such conspiracy and, in April, Sarmento Rodrigues, the Minister of Overseas Territories, ordered Gorgulho to return to Lisbon. He was promoted to the rank of general and praised by the Minister of the Army, General Abranches Pinto, for his actions. Seven forros were tried and convicted for the killing of two police officers.

The Batepá massacre marked the rise of the independence movement in Portuguese São Tomé and Príncipe, and is commemorated annually as a national holiday (Dia de Mártires da Liberdade) on February 3.

== See also ==
- List of massacres in São Tomé and Príncipe
