= Riboque Santana =

- Location on São Tomé Island
- Coordinates: 0.2509°N 6.7402°E
- Country: São Tomé and Príncipe
- Island: São Tomé
- District: Cantagalo

Population (2012)
  - Total: 1,001
- Time zone: UTC+1 (WAT)

Riboque Santana is a settlement in Cantagalo District, São Tomé Island in the nation of São Tomé and Príncipe. Its population is 1,001 (2012 census). It lies directly south of Santana.

== Population history ==
Historical population
Year	Pop.	±%
2001	1,440	—
2008	1,641	+14.0%
2012	1,001	−39.0%
