= Blublu, São Tomé and Príncipe =

Blublu
- Village
- Location on São Tomé Island
- Coordinates: 0.319°N 6.710°E
- Country: São Tomé and Príncipe
- Island: São Tomé
- District: Mé-Zóchi

Population (2012)
  - Total: 19
- Time zone: UTC+1 (WAT)

Blublu is a small village on São Tomé Island in São Tomé and Príncipe. Its population is 19 (2012 census). It lies 0.7 km southeast of Bobo Forro and 3 km southwest of the city centre of the capital São Tomé.

== Population history ==
Historical population
Year	Pop.	±%
2001	4	—
2008	5	+25.0%
2012	19	+280.0%
