= Santa Clotilde =

- Village
- Location on São Tomé Island
- Coordinates: 0.253°N 6.690°E
- Country: São Tomé and Príncipe
- Island: São Tomé
- District: Cantagalo

Population (2012)
  - Total: 112
- Time zone: UTC+1 (WAT)

Santa Clotilde (Portuguese for Saint Clotilde) is a village in the eastern part of São Tomé Island in São Tomé and Príncipe. Its population is 112 (2012 census). It lies 6 km west of Santana.
