= Aldair (disambiguation) =

Aldair (born 1965), Aldair Nascimento dos Santos, was a Brazilian football defender

Aldair is a given name. It may also refer to:

- Aldair Santos (born 1989), Santomean football midfielder
- Aldair Basto (born 1990), Mexican football midfielder
- Aldair Baldé (born 1992), Bissau-Guinean football winger
- Aldair Quintana (born 1994), Colombian football goalkeeper
- Aldair Salazar (born 1994), Peruvian football defender
- Aldair Rodríguez (born 1994), Peruvian football striker
- Aldair Neto (born 1994), Angolan football forward
- Aldair Mengual (born 1997), Mexican football defender
- Aldair (footballer, born 1996), Aldair Ribeiro de Souza, Brazilian football forward
- Aldaír Ferreira (born 1998), Angolan football midfielder
- Aldair Fuentes (born 1998), Peruvian football defensive midfielder
