= Água Izé =

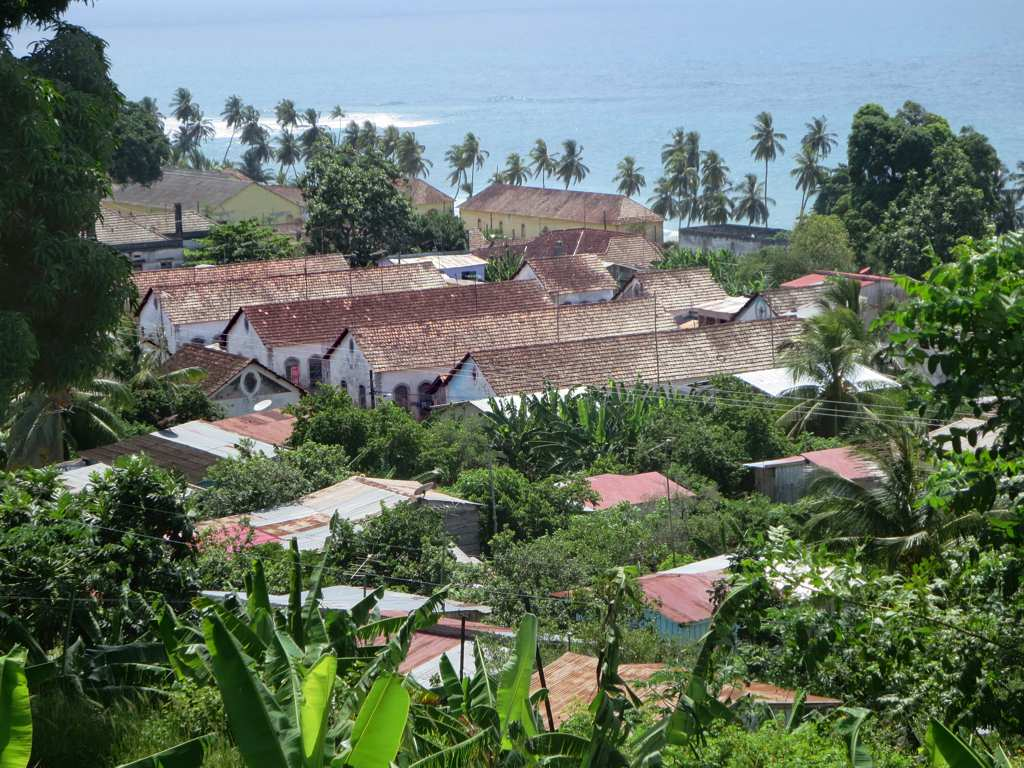
- The residential area, once used as the worker's housing for the town's cocoa warehouse

- Location on São Tomé Island
- Coordinates: 0.2184°N 6.7273°E
- Country: São Tomé and Príncipe
- Island: São Tomé
- District: Cantagalo

Population (2012)
  - Total: 1,255
- Time zone: UTC+1 (WAT)

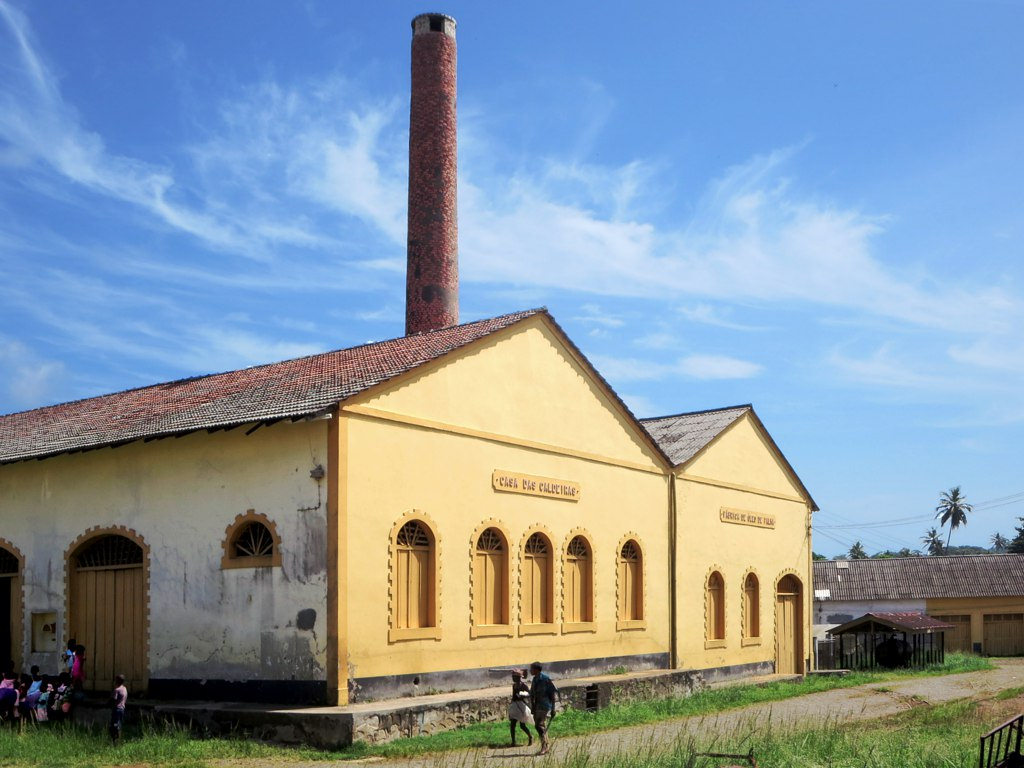
Roça Água Izé, a former cocoa warehouse which is today a museum

Água Izé is a village on São Tomé Island. Its population is 1,255 (2012 census). It lies on the coast, 4 km northeast of Ribeira Afonso and 5 km southwest of Santana. The most notable landmark is Roça Água Izé, a former plantation complex. Most of the preserved buildings date from the 1910s.

== Population history ==
Historical population
Year	Pop.	±%
2001	1,044	—
2008	1,190	+14.0%
2012	1,255	+5.5%
