= Plateaux Region =

Plateaux Region may refer to:

- Plateaux Region, Congo
- Plateaux Region, Togo

== See also ==
- Plateau (disambiguation)
