= Água Gunu =

Coordinates: 0.341704°N 6.671255°E

Agua Gunu
- Village
- Location on São Tomé Island
- Country: São Tomé and Príncipe
- Island: São Tomé
- District: Mé-Zóchi

Population (2008)
  - Total: 1,018
- Time zone: UTC+1 (WAT)

Água Gunu is a village in Mé-Zóchi District, São Tomé Island in São Tomé and Príncipe. Its population is 1,018 (2008).

== Population history ==
Historical population
Year	Pop.	±%
2001 (census)	893	—
2008 (estimate)	1,018	+14.0%
