= Bombom =

Bombom may refer to:

- Bombom, São Tomé and Príncipe, village located in the Príncipe island
- Bombom (album), by Rita Lee
- Adriana Bombom (born 1974), Brazilian entertainer
- Comic BomBom, a Japanese manga magazine published by Kodansha
- "BomBom", by Macklemore
- "Bom Bom", Sam and the Womp song
