= Água Creola =

- Village
- Location on São Tomé Island
- Coordinates: 0.3102°N 6.6898°E
- Country: São Tomé and Príncipe
- Island: São Tomé
- District: Mé-Zóchi

Population (2012)
  - Total: 203
- Time zone: UTC+1 (WAT)

Água Creola is a village in Mé-Zóchi District on São Tomé Island in São Tomé and Príncipe. Its population is 203 (2012 census).

== Population history ==
Historical population
Year	Pop.	±%
2001	918	—
2008	1,046	+13.9%
2012	203	−80.6%
