= Cova Água =

- Location on São Tomé Island
- Coordinates: 0.2621°N 6.7419°E
- Country: São Tomé and Príncipe
- Island: São Tomé
- District: Cantagalo

Population (2012)
  - Total: 363
- Time zone: UTC+1 (WAT)

Cova Água is a settlement in Cantagalo District, São Tomé Island in the nation of São Tomé and Príncipe. Its population is 363 (2012 census). It lies on the coast, directly north of Santana.

== Population history ==
Historical population
Year	Pop.	±%
2001	636	—
2008	725	+14.0%
2012	363	−49.9%
