= Picão Flor =

- Location on São Tomé Island
- Coordinates: 0.2479°N 6.7382°E
- Country: São Tomé and Príncipe
- Island: São Tomé
- District: Cantagalo

Population (2012)
  - Total: 1,911
- Time zone: UTC+1 (WAT)

Picão Flor is a settlement in Cantagalo District, São Tomé Island in the nation of São Tomé and Príncipe. Its population is 1,911 (2012 census). It lies 1.2 km southwest of Santana.

== Population history ==
Historical population
Year	Pop.	±%
2001	549	—
2008	626	+14.0%
2012	1,911	+205.3%
