= Bobo Forro =

- Village
- Location on São Tomé Island
- Coordinates: 0.324°N 6.705°E
- Country: São Tomé and Príncipe
- Island: São Tomé
- District: Mé-Zóchi

Population (2012)
  - Total: 715
- Time zone: UTC+1 (WAT)

Bobo Forro is a village in the north-eastern part of São Tomé Island in São Tomé and Príncipe, part of Mé-Zóchi District. Its population is 715 (2012 census). It lies 3 km southwest of the city centre of the capital São Tomé, and 4 km northeast of Trindade. The adjacent village in the Água Grande District is also called Bobo Forro.

== Population history ==
Historical population
Year	Pop.	±%
2001	1,289	—
2008	1,469	+14.0%
2012	715	−51.3%
