= Plateau (disambiguation) =

A plateau is an area of flat terrain that is raised significantly above the surrounding area.

Plateau or plateaux or plateaus may also refer to:

== Earth science ==
- Dissected plateau, a highly eroded plateau which may have sharp relief
- Oceanic plateau, a submarine area higher that the normal sea floor depth

== People ==
- Joseph Plateau (1801–1883), Belgian mathematician
- Pierre Plateau (1924–2018), French Roman Catholic prelate

== Places ==
- Plateau Department, a department of Benin
- Plateau, Benin, an arrondissement in the Collines Department
- Plateau, a place name in Inverness County, Nova Scotia, Canada
- Le Plateau, a neighbourhood in Montreal, Canada
- Le Plateau (Gatineau), a neighbourhood in Gatineau, Canada
- Plateau (Praia), on the island of Santiago, Cape Verde
- Plateaux Department (Congo)
- Plateaux Department (Gabon)
- Lasithi Plateau, a high plain on Crete, Greece
- Plateau, Ivory Coast, a district of Abidjan
- Plateau (state), a state in Nigeria
- Plateau, São Tomé and Príncipe, a village in São Tomé and Príncipe
- Plateaux Region, Togo

== Mathematics ==
- Plateau's problem, in showing the existence of a minimal surface with a given boundary
- Plateau's laws, describing the structure of soap films
- Plateau (mathematics), a region where a function is constant

== Art and entertainment ==
- "Plateau" (song), by Meat Puppets, popularized by Nirvana
- PlatEAU (band), an electronic band
- "The Plateau" (Fringe), a television episode
- Plateau (museum), a defunct art gallery in Seoul, South Korea
- "Plateau", a song by Sakanaction from Adapt (2022)

== Other uses ==
- Plateau effect, a reduction in the effectiveness of once effective measures over time
- Plateau phase, in physiology and human sexuality, the second stage of sexual arousal in the Masters and Johnson model
- Plateau Systems, a provider of talent management systems
