= Anselmo Andrade =

- Village
- Location on São Tomé Island
- Coordinates: 0°14′N 6°41′E
- Country: São Tomé and Príncipe
- Island: São Tomé
- District: Cantagalo

Population (2012)
  - Total: 294
- Time zone: UTC+1 (WAT)

Anselmo Andrade is a village on São Tomé Island in the nation of São Tomé and Príncipe. Its population is 294 (2012 census).
