= Alice, São Tomé and Príncipe =

Alice
- Location on São Tomé Island
- Coordinates: 0.3127°N 6.6526°E
- Country: São Tomé and Príncipe
- Island: São Tomé
- District: Mé-Zóchi

Population (2012)
  - Total: 44
- Time zone: UTC+1 (WAT)

Alice is a village in Mé-Zóchi District, São Tomé Island in São Tomé and Príncipe. Its population is 44 (2012 census).

== Population history ==
Historical population
Year	Pop.	±%
2001	11	—
2008	13	+18.2%
2012	44	+238.5%
