= Santa Margarida, São Tomé and Príncipe =

Santa Margarida
- Location on São Tomé Island
- Coordinates: 0.3245°N 6.6587°E
- Country: São Tomé and Príncipe
- Island: São Tomé
- District: Mé-Zóchi

Population (2012)
  - Total: 384
- Time zone: UTC+1 (WAT)

Santa Margarida is a village in the mid-north of São Tomé Island in São Tomé and Príncipe, part of the Mé-Zóchi District. Its population is 384 (2012 census). It lies 1 km southwest of Madalena and 4 km northwest of Trindade.

== Population history ==
Historical population
| Year | Pop. | ±% |
|---|---|---|
| 2001 | 342 | — |
| 2008 | 390 | +14.0% |
| 2012 | 384 | −1.5% |
