= Lemos, São Tomé and Príncipe =

Lemos
- Location on São Tomé Island
- Coordinates: 0°18′N 6°42′E
- Country: São Tomé and Príncipe
- Island: São Tomé
- District: Mé-Zóchi

Population (2012)
  - Total: 1,136
- Time zone: UTC+1 (WAT)

Lemos is a village on São Tomé Island in the nation of São Tomé and Príncipe. Its population is 1,136 (2012 census). It is 2 km east of Trindade.
