= Batepá =

Batepa
- Village
- Location on São Tomé Island
- Coordinates: 0°18′06″N 6°40′07″E
- Country: São Tomé and Príncipe
- Island: São Tomé
- District: Mé-Zóchi

Population (2012)
  - Total: 775
- Time zone: UTC+1 (WAT)

Batepa is a village on São Tomé Island in São Tomé and Príncipe. Its population is 775 (2012 census). It lies 2 km west of Trindade and 2 km east of Monte Café. It was the starting point of the Batepá massacre, a brutally crushed rebellion in February 1953, in which hundreds of local inhabitants were killed. It marked the rise of the independence movement in Portuguese São Tomé and Príncipe, and is commemorated annually as a national holiday (Dia de Mártires da Liberdade) on February 3.

== Population history ==
Historical population
| Year | Pop. | ±% |
|---|---|---|
| 2001 | 113 | — |
| 2008 | 129 | +14.2% |
| 2012 | 775 | +500.8% |
