= Madalena, São Tomé and Príncipe =

Madalena
- Village
- Location on São Tomé Island
- Coordinates: 0.3293°N 6.6654°E
- Country: São Tomé and Príncipe
- Island: São Tomé
- District: Mé-Zóchi

Population (2008)
  - Total: 220
- Time zone: UTC+1 (WAT)

Madalena is a small town on São Tomé Island in São Tomé and Príncipe. Its population is 221 (2012 census). It lies 1 km northeast of Santa Margarida, 2.5 km south of Boa Entrada and 7 km west of the capital São Tomé.

== Population history ==
Historical population
Year	Pop.	±%
2001	193	—
2008	220	+14.0%
2012	221	+0.5%

== Notable person ==
- Filipe Santo, singer, winner of the 2nd STP Music Awards in 2016.
