= Nova Olinda, Paraíba =

Coordinates: 7°28′48″S 38°02′31″W

- Municipality
- Flag Coat of arms
- Interactive map of Nova Olinda, Paraíba
- Country: Brazil
- Region: Northeast
- State: Paraíba
- Mesoregion: Sertao Paraibana

Population (2020)
  - Total: 5,920
- Time zone: UTC−3 (BRT)

Nova Olinda, Paraíba is a municipality in the state of Paraíba in the Northeast Region of Brazil.

== See also ==
- List of municipalities in Paraíba
