= Cantagalo District =

District of São Tomé and Príncipe

Cantagalo
- District
- Location within São Tomé and Príncipe
- Coordinates: 0°13′N 6°42′E
- Country: São Tomé and Príncipe
- Island: São Tomé
- Seat: Santana

Area
  - Total: 119 km^{2} (46 sq mi)

Population (2012)
  - Total: 17,161
  - Density: 144/km^{2} (374/sq mi)
- Time zone: UTC+0 (UTC)

Cantagalo is a district of São Tomé and Príncipe, on São Tomé Island. Its area is 119 km^{2} (46 sq mi), and its population is 17,161 (2012). The district seat is Santana. Cantagalo is divided into the two statistical subdistricts Santana and Ribeira Afonso.

== Population ==
Population of Cantagalo District (1940—2012)
Year	Population
1940	7,863
1950	8,541
1960	9,768
1970	9,667
1981	10,435
1991	11,433
2001	13,258
2012	17,161

== Settlements ==
The main settlement is the town Santana. Other settlements are:

- Água Izé
- Anselmo Andrade
- Cidade Alta
- Cova Água
- Guegue
- Nova Olinda
- Picão Flor
- Praia Messias Alves
- Ribeira Afonso
- Riboque Santana
- Santa Clotilde
- Uba Budo
- Zandrigo

== Points of interests ==
- Roça Água Izé
- Ilhéu de Santana

== Politics ==
Cantagalo currently has seven seats in the National Assembly.
