= Uba Budo =

- Location on São Tomé Island
- Coordinates: 0.262°N 6.702°E
- Country: São Tomé and Príncipe
- Island: São Tomé
- District: Cantagalo

Population (2012)
  - Total: 468
- Time zone: UTC+1 (WAT)

Uba Budo is a village on São Tomé Island in the nation of São Tomé and Príncipe. Its population is 468 (2012 census). The locality Montes Hermínios lies 2 km south of Uba Budo.

== Population history ==
Historical population
Year	Pop.	±%
2001	380	—
2008	433	+13.9%
2012	468	+8.1%
