= Ribeira Afonso =

- Village
- Location on São Tomé Island
- Coordinates: 0.1957°N 6.7004°E
- Country: São Tomé and Príncipe
- Island: São Tomé
- District: Cantagalo

Population (2008)
  - Total: 1,621
- Time zone: UTC+1 (WAT)

Ribeira Afonso is a village on the eastern coast of São Tomé Island in São Tomé and Príncipe. Its population is 1,621 (2008 est.). It is 4 km southwest of Água Izé and 16 km south of the capital São Tomé.

== Population history ==
Historical population
Year	Pop.	±%
2001	1,422	—
2008	1,621	+14.0%
