= Filipe Santo =

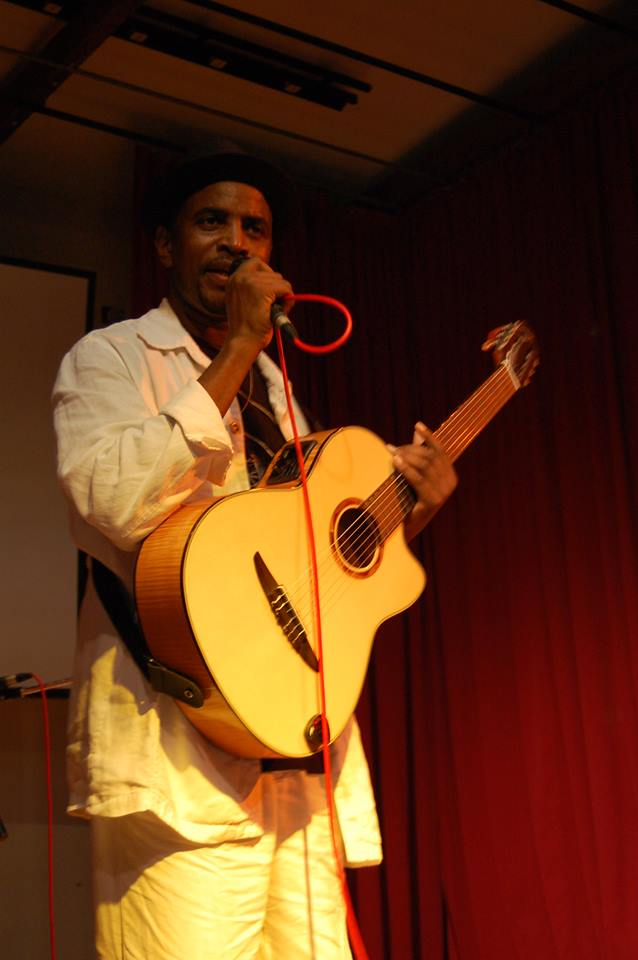

Background information
- Born: January 5, 1959 (age 66); Madalena, São Tomé Island, São Tomé and Príncipe
- Genres: ússua, rumba, socopé, zouk
- Occupation: singer
- Instruments: vocals, guitar, bass, piano
- Years active: 1973–present

Filipe Santo (born 5 January 1959) is a Santomean singer who is currently one of the country's greatest singers. His songs relates to different kinds of love, the daily lives of Santomeans, corruptions and society in general.

One of his marked moments of his career was his participation in the banned Trópic-Som in 1985 where he was a guitarist, composer and interpreter.

In Lisbon, his musical experience began in the 1990s with Dúo Camu&Lipe, with he took part in other TV programs in different Portuguese channels.

His music was accompanied by the poet Olinda Beja. He made his first album "MUSA", produced by Equasom in 2002. Afterwards he went on concert tours in Tunisia, Portugal, Germany, France, Brazil, Spain, Switzerland, Italy and a few others. In 2015, he launched his second album Lagaia and together sang with other great names in African music. His album won the best album at the 2nd STP Music Awards the following year.
