= Nova Olinda, São Tomé and Príncipe =

Nova Olinda
- Village
- Location on São Tomé Island
- Coordinates: 0°14′30″N 6°44′0″E
- Country: São Tomé and Príncipe
- Island: São Tomé
- District: Cantagalo

Population (2012)
  - Total: 107
- Time zone: UTC+1 (WAT)

Nova Olinda is a village in the eastern part of São Tomé Island in São Tomé and Príncipe. Its population is 107 (2012 census). It lies 2 km southwest of Santana.
