= Java, São Tomé and Príncipe =

Java
- Location on São Tomé Island
- Coordinates: 0°15′40″N 6°39′10″E
- Country: São Tomé and Príncipe
- Island: São Tomé
- District: Mé-Zóchi

Population (2012)
  - Total: 19
- Time zone: UTC+1 (WAT)

Java is a village on São Tomé Island in the nation of São Tomé and Príncipe. Its population is 19 (2012 census). It was established as a plantation (roça).

== Population history ==
Historical population
Year	Pop.	±%
2001	27	—
2008	31	+14.8%
2012	19	−38.7%
