= Aldair Santos =

São Toméan footballer

Aldair
Personal information
- Full name: Aldair Cruz dos Santos
- Date of birth: 4 September 1989 (age 37)
- Place of birth: Trindade, São Tomé and Príncipe
- Height: 1.89 m (6 ft 2 1/2 in)
- Position: Midfielder

Team information
- Current team: RSD Jette
- Number: 8

Senior career*
Years	Team	Apps	(Gls)
2009–2012	Bon Air Sport		
2012–2014	Black Star FC		
2014–	RSD Jette		

International career
2017–	São Tomé and Príncipe	1	(0)
- * Club domestic league appearances and goals

Aldair Cruz dos Santos (born 4 September 1989), known simply as Aldair, is a São Toméan footballer who plays as a midfielder for Belgian club RSD Jette and the São Tomé and Príncipe national team.

He left his country at age 13. He joined Belgian provincial side Bon Air in 2009, leaving it three years later when he moved to Black Star, where he played until 2014 when he signed for RSD Jette. As a result of his long-term current residence in Belgium, he also holds Belgian citizenship.

== International career ==
Aldair made his international debut on 22 March 2017, when he was a starter in a loss Africa Cup of Nations qualifier against Madagascar.
