= Bombom, São Tomé and Príncipe =

Bombom
- Village
- Location on São Tomé Island
- Coordinates: 0°18′40″N 6°43′40″E
- Country: São Tomé and Príncipe
- Island: São Tomé
- District: Mé-Zóchi

Population (2012)
  - Total: 1,754
- Time zone: UTC+1 (WAT)

Bombom is a town in the north-eastern part of São Tomé Island in São Tomé and Príncipe. Its population is 498 (2012 census). It lies 2 km west of Pantufo and 3 km south of the city centre of the capital São Tomé.

== Population history ==
Historical population
Year	Pop.	±%
2001	1,364	—
2008	1,555	+14.0%
2012	498	−68.0%

== Sporting club ==
- Inter Bom-Bom, a football (soccer) club that currently plays in the regional Premier Division.
