= Santana, São Tomé and Príncipe =

Town in São Tomé and Príncipe

Santana
- Town
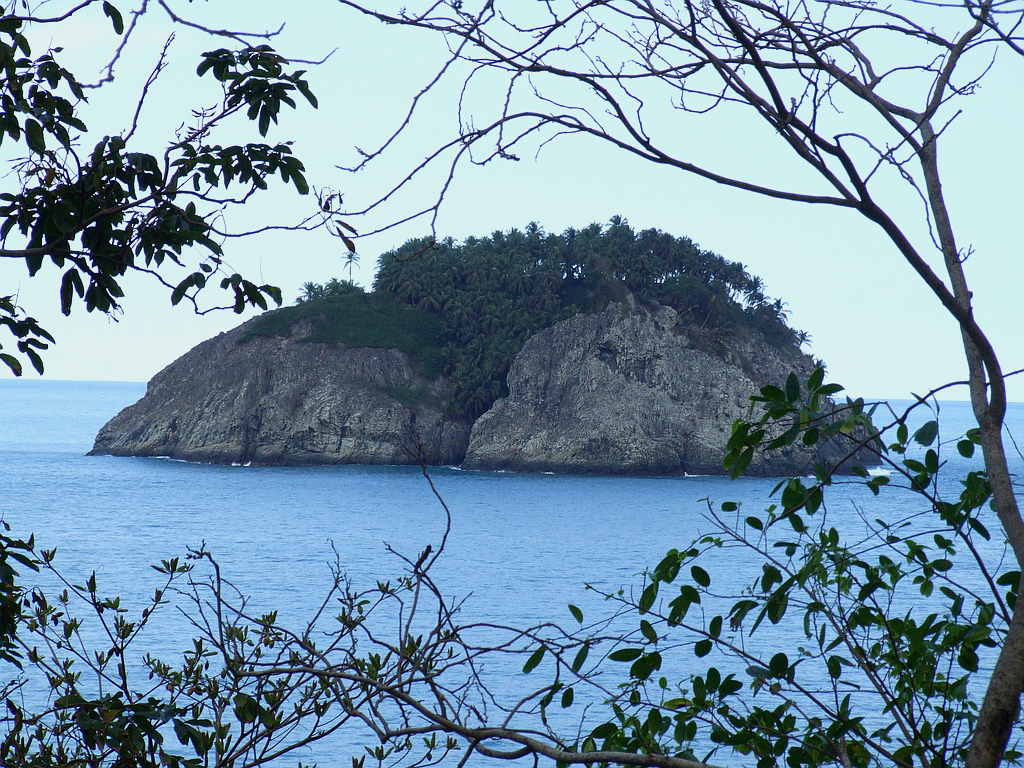
- Ilhéu Santana in 2008

- Location on São Tomé Island
- Coordinates: 0°15′30″N 6°44′30″E
- Country: São Tomé and Príncipe
- Island: São Tomé
- District: Cantagalo District

Population (2012)
  - Total: 10,290
- Time zone: UTC+1 (WAT)

Santana (Portuguese for Saint Anne) is a town on the eastern coast of São Tomé Island, which is part of the island nation of São Tomé and Príncipe. It is the seat of Cantagalo District. The population of Santana with the adjacent settlements Cidade Alta, Cova Água, Gomes, Nova Olinda, Picão Flor, Praia Messias Alves, Riboque Santana and Zandrigo is 10,290 (2012). Santana lies 9 km south of the capital São Tomé and 17 km northeast of São João dos Angolares. The islet Ilhéu de Santana lies about 1 km off-shore, 2.5 km southeast of Santana.

== Population history ==
Historical population
Year	Pop.	±%
2001	6,228	—
2012	10,290	+65.2%

== Sister cities ==
- Cascais, Portugal

== Notable people ==
- Alda Bandeira, politician
- Conceição Lima, poet

== Sports ==
- 6 de Setembro - football (soccer) club
- Santana FC
