= Monte Café, São Tomé and Príncipe =

Monte Café
- Village
- Location on São Tomé Island
- Coordinates: 0.30°N 6.64°E
- Country: São Tomé and Príncipe
- Island: São Tomé
- District: Mé-Zóchi
- Elevation: 670 m (2,200 ft)

Population (2012)
  - Total: 684
- Time zone: UTC+1 (WAT)

Monte Café (Portuguese for "coffee mountain") is a village on São Tomé Island in the nation of São Tomé and Príncipe. Its population is 684 (2012 census). It lies 4.5 km west of Trindade. Situated in a mountainous terrain at 670 m elevation, very suitable for the cultivation of coffee, it is the site of one of the oldest plantations of São Tomé, established in 1858.

== Population history ==
Historical population
Year	Pop.	±%
2001	623	—
2008	710	+14.0%
2012	684	−3.7%

== Sporting club ==
- Agrosport, currently plays in the second regional division
