= Mé-Zóchi District =

District of São Tomé and Príncipe

Mé-Zóchi
- District
- Location within São Tomé and Príncipe
- Coordinates: 0°15′N 6°40′E
- Country: São Tomé and Príncipe
- Island: São Tomé
- Seat: Trindade

Area
  - Total: 122 km^{2} (47 sq mi)

Population (2018)
  - Total: 50,800
  - Density: 416/km^{2} (1,080/sq mi)
- Time zone: UTC+0 (UTC)

Mé-Zóchi is a district of São Tomé and Príncipe, on São Tomé Island. Its area is 122 km^{2} (47 sq mi). With 44,752 residents (2012) rising to 50,800 in 2018, it is the second most populous district of the country. The district seat is Trindade. It is divided into the five statistical subdistricts Trindade, Madalena, Caixão Grande, Bombom and Almas.

== Geography ==
The western part of the district is mountainous, and lies partly in the Parque Natural Obô de São Tomé. The eastern part is densely populated, due to the proximity of the city São Tomé. It has a short coastline.

== Population ==
Population of Mé-Zóchi District (1940—2012)
Year	Population
1940	18,327
1950	18,047
1960	20,372
1970	20,516
1981	24,258
1991	29,758
2001	35,105
2012	44,752

== Settlements ==
The main settlement is the town Trindade. Other settlements are:

- Água Creola
- Água Gunu
- Alice
- Almas
- Batepá
- Blublu
- Bobo Foro
- Bombaim
- Bombom
- Caixão Grande
- Caminho Novo
- Cruzeiro
- Folha Fede
- Java
- Lemos
- Madalena
- Monte Café
- Ototó
- Plateau
- Piedade
- Praia Melão
- Quinta da Graça
- Santa Cruz
- São Nicolau
- Diogo Simão
- Santa Margarida

== Economy ==
The main economic activity in the district is agriculture, and it forms a large part of the national agricultural production. Coffee and cocoa are the main products, these are also the main export products of the country. The district has 26.28% of the farmers of the country.

== Politics ==
Lobata currently has 13 seats in the National Assembly.

== Notable people ==
- Almada Negreiros, painter and artist
- Francisco Fortunato Pires, National Assembly member from 1994 to 2002
- Filipe Santo, singer, winner of the Best Album at the 2nd STP Music Awards in 2016

== Twin town ==
The district is twinned with:

- Borba, Portugal
- Guimarães, Portugal
- Sintra, Portugal
- Vagos, Portugal
- Valongo, Portugal
