= Trindade (São Tomé and Príncipe) =

- Town
- Location on São Tomé Island
- Coordinates: 0°18′N 6°41′E
- Country: São Tomé and Príncipe
- Island: São Tomé
- District: Mé-Zóchi District
- Elevation: 254 m (833 ft)

Population (2012)
  - Total: 16,140
- Time zone: UTC+1 (WAT)

Trindade (Portuguese for the Trinity) is a town located on São Tomé Island, which is part of the island nation of São Tomé and Príncipe. Its population is 16,140 (2012 census). It is the seat of Mé-Zóchi District. It lies 7 km southwest of the capital São Tomé. Nearby places include Diogo Simão to the northeast, Lemos to the east, Cruzeiro to the south and Piedade to the west. There is a secondary school in Trindade, opened in 2011, with a capacity of 720 students.

During the Batepá massacre, a brutally crushed rebellion in February 1953, hundreds of inhabitants of Trindade and nearby Batepá were killed.

== Population history ==
Historical population
Year	Pop.	±%
2001	6,049	—
2012	16,140	+166.8%

== Notable people ==
- Almada Negreiros, painter and artist
- Aldair Santos, footballer
- Nuno Xavier, aerospace engineer, signed Independence from Portugal
