= São Tomé (island) =

Largest island of São Tomé and Príncipe

Native name: Ilha de São Tomé
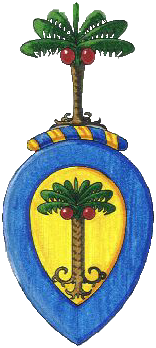
- Emblem of São Tomé

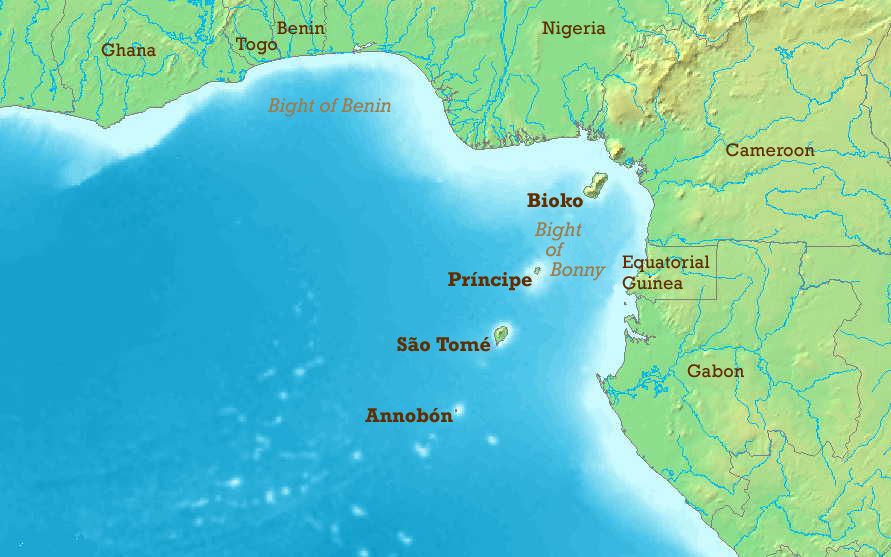

- Location within São Tomé and Príncipe Location within Africa

Geography
- Location: Gulf of Guinea
- Coordinates: 0.22°N 6.61°E
- Archipelago: Cameroon line
- Area: 859 km^{2} (332 sq mi)
- Length: 48 km (29.8 mi)
- Width: 32 km (19.9 mi)
- Highest elevation: 2,024 m (6640 ft)
- Highest point: Pico de São Tomé

Administration
- São Tomé and Príncipe
- Districts: 6
- Largest settlement: São Tomé (pop. 71,868)

Demographics
- Population: 193,380 (2018)
- Pop. density: 225/km^{2} (583/sq mi)
- Ethnic groups: Mestiços, angolares (descendants of Angolan slaves), forros (descendants of freed slaves), serviçais (contract laborers from Angola, Mozambique, and Cape Verde), tongas (children of serviçais born on the islands), Europeans (primarily Portuguese)

São Tomé location in Africa

São Tomé is an island located in the Gulf of Guinea. At 859 km^{2} (332 sq mi) and a population of 193,380 as of May 2018, it is the largest and most populous island of São Tomé and Príncipe, being home to 96% of the country's population. The island is divided into six districts. It is located 2 km (1.2 mi) north of the Equator.

== Geography ==
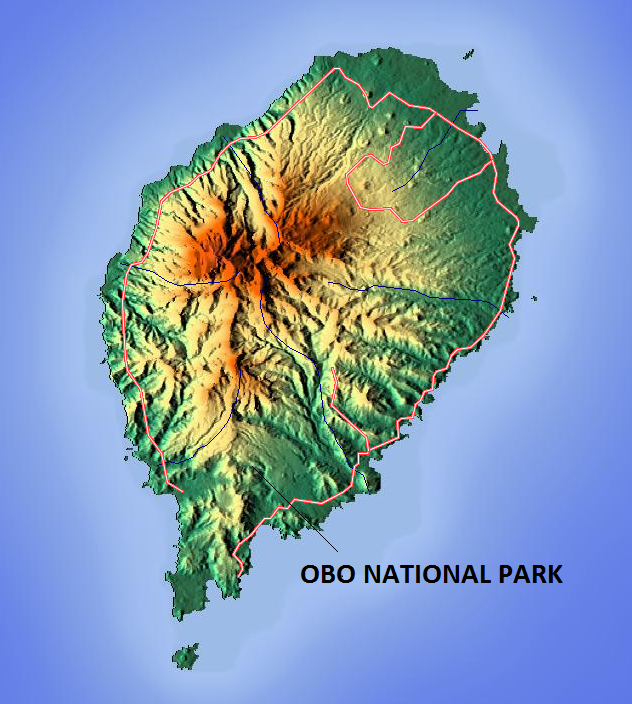
Island of São Tomé

São Tomé is about 48 kilometres (30 miles) long (north-south) by 32 kilometres (20 miles) wide (east-west). It rises to 2,024 metres (6,640 feet) at Pico de São Tomé and includes the homonymous capital city on the northeast coast. It is situated in the Gulf of Guinea, off the western equatorial coast of Africa. The nearest city on mainland Africa is the port city of Port Gentil in Gabon located 240 kilometres (150 miles) to the east.

The island is surrounded by a number of small islands, including Ilhéu das Rolas, Ilhéu das Cabras and Ilhéu Gabado.

== Languages ==
The main language is Portuguese, but there are many speakers of Forro and Angolar (Ngola), two Portuguese-based creole languages. The name "São Tomé" is Portuguese for Saint Thomas.

== Geology ==
The entire island of São Tomé is a massive shield volcano that rises from the floor of the Atlantic Ocean, over 3,000 m (10,000 ft) below sea level. It formed along the Cameroon line, a line of volcanoes extending from Cameroon southwest into the Atlantic Ocean. Most of the lava erupted on São Tomé over the last million years has been basalt. The youngest dated rock on the island is about 100,000 years old, but numerous more recent cinder cones are found on the southeast side of the island.

== Environment and economy ==
The higher slopes of the island are forested and form part of the Parque Natural Obô de São Tomé, but agriculture is important near the north and east coasts. The chief exports are cocoa, coffee, copra, and palm products, while there is also a fishing industry.

Large reserves of oil are in the ocean between Nigeria and São Tomé. The discovery has been lamented by some as endangering the nation's political stability and natural environment. In response to these concerns the government of São Tomé and Príncipe has drawn up legislation in an attempt to ensure the efficient and equitable use of oil revenues over time.

In 2025, the island was designated as a biosphere reserve by UNESCO, making São Tomé and Príncipe the first country to be designated as such in its entirety following a previous designation on Príncipe.

== Natural history ==
=== Birds ===
The island has a total of 63 regular bird species, plus an additional 36 vagrant and unconfirmed species. Of these, 19 are endemic and 3 near endemic; in addition, the local subspecies of olive ibis (Bostrychia olivacea bocagei) and maroon pigeon (Columba thomensis) are endemic and considered critically endangered. Six species are considered vulnerable, and two critically endangered (São Tomé fiscal and São Tomé grosbeak).

== Administrative divisions ==
São Tomé is divided into the following six districts (seat within brackets):

1. Água Grande (São Tomé)
2. Cantagalo (Santana)
3. Caué (São João dos Angolares)
4. Lembá (Neves)
5. Lobata (Guadalupe)
6. Mé-Zóchi (Trindade)

== Towns and villages ==
Villages on the island include:

- Agua-Coco
- Agua Ize
- Alice
- Alto Douro
- Andrade
- Bela Vista
- Blublu
- Bom Sucesso
- Buenos Aires
- Dona Augusta
- Dona Eugenia
- Enjale
- Formiga
- General Fonseco
- Graça
- Granja
- Guadalupe
- Guegue Norte
- Henrique
- Java
- Lemos
- Mbombo
- Mbondi
- Monte Café
- Monte Herminios
- Monte Rosa
- Neves
- Nova Olinda
- Nzumbi
- Plato Café
- Ponta Figo
- Portinho
- Porto Alegre
- Perseverança
- Quimpo
- Ribeira Afonso
- Santa Catarina
- Santa Clotilde
- Santa Cruz
- Santa Josefina
- Santana
- Santo António
- São João dos Angolares
- São José
- São Tomé
- Saudade
- Trindade
- Ubabundo
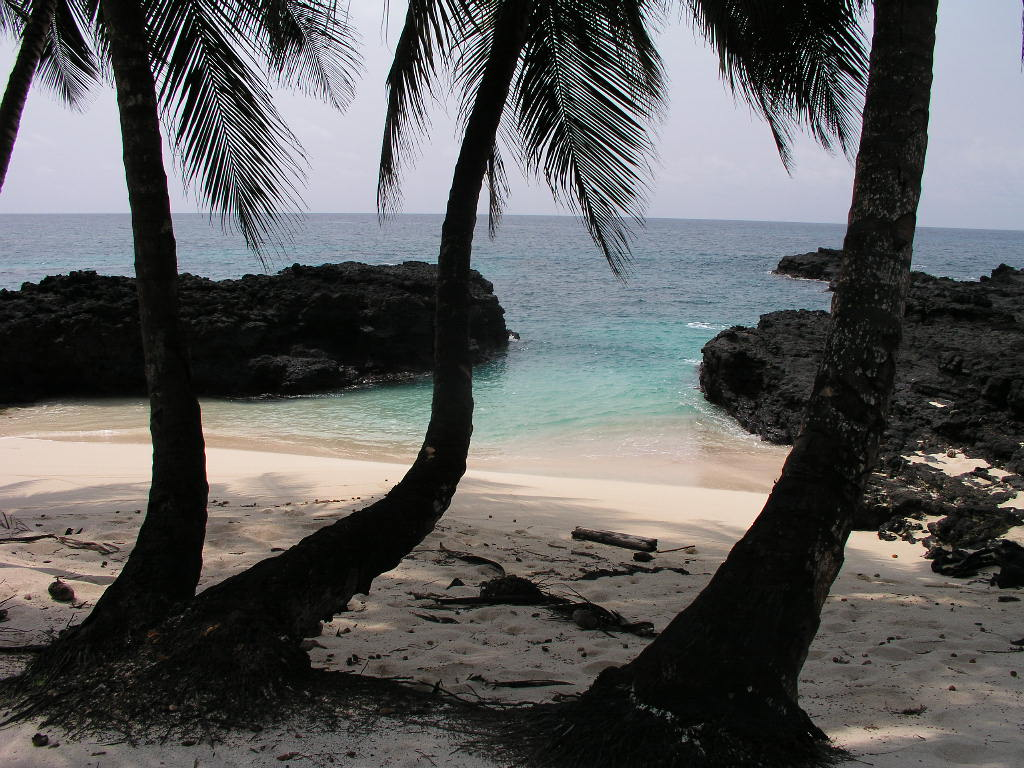
São Tomé Island

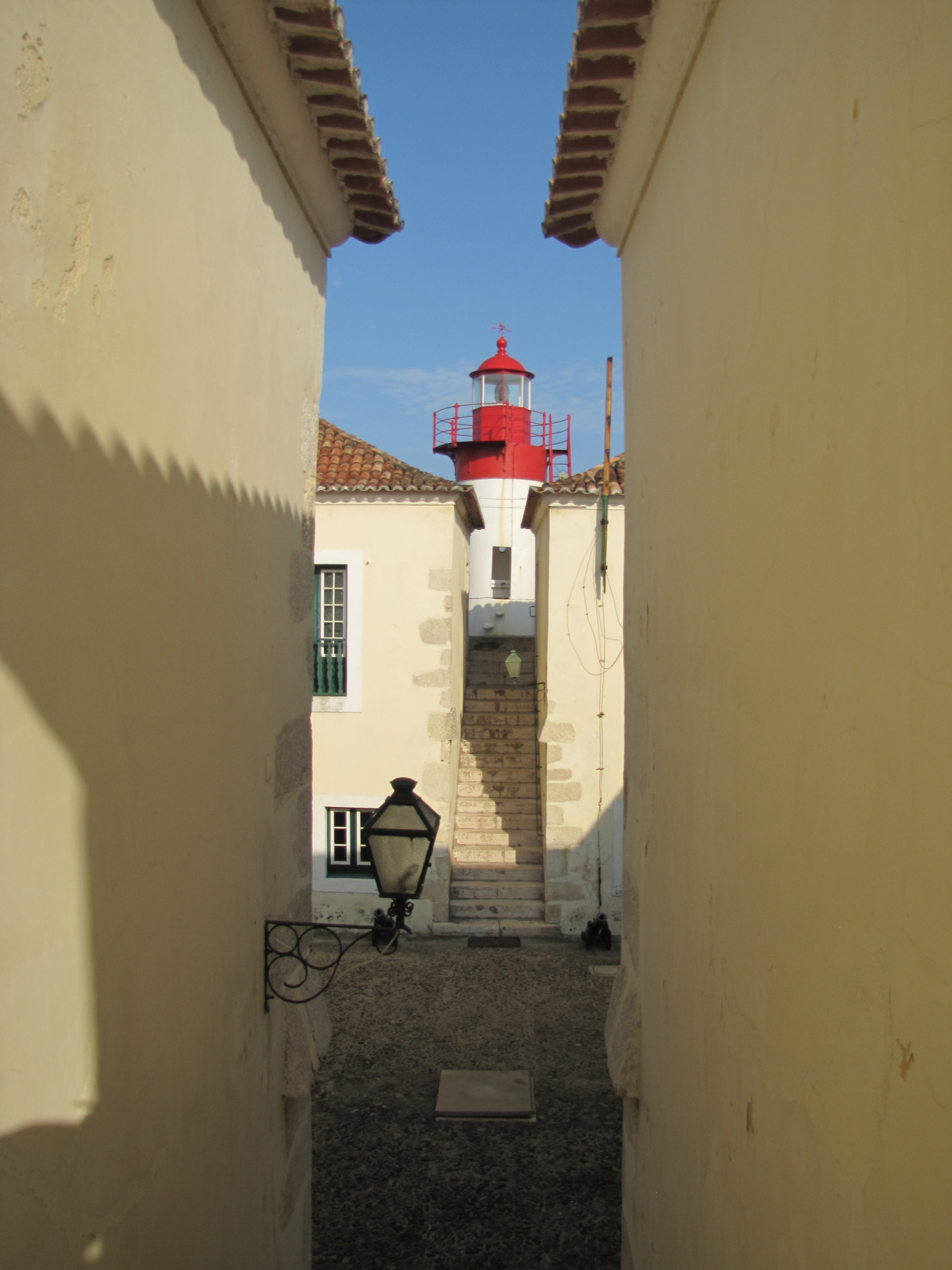
São Sebastião Lighthouse

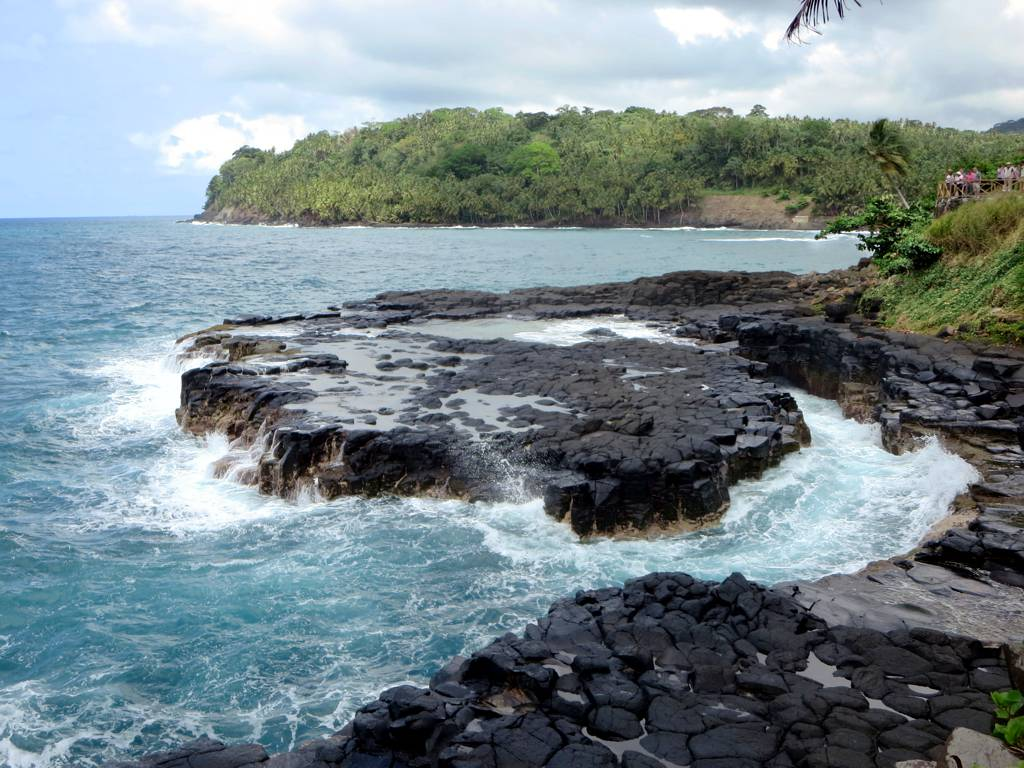
Boca do Inferno, São Tomé

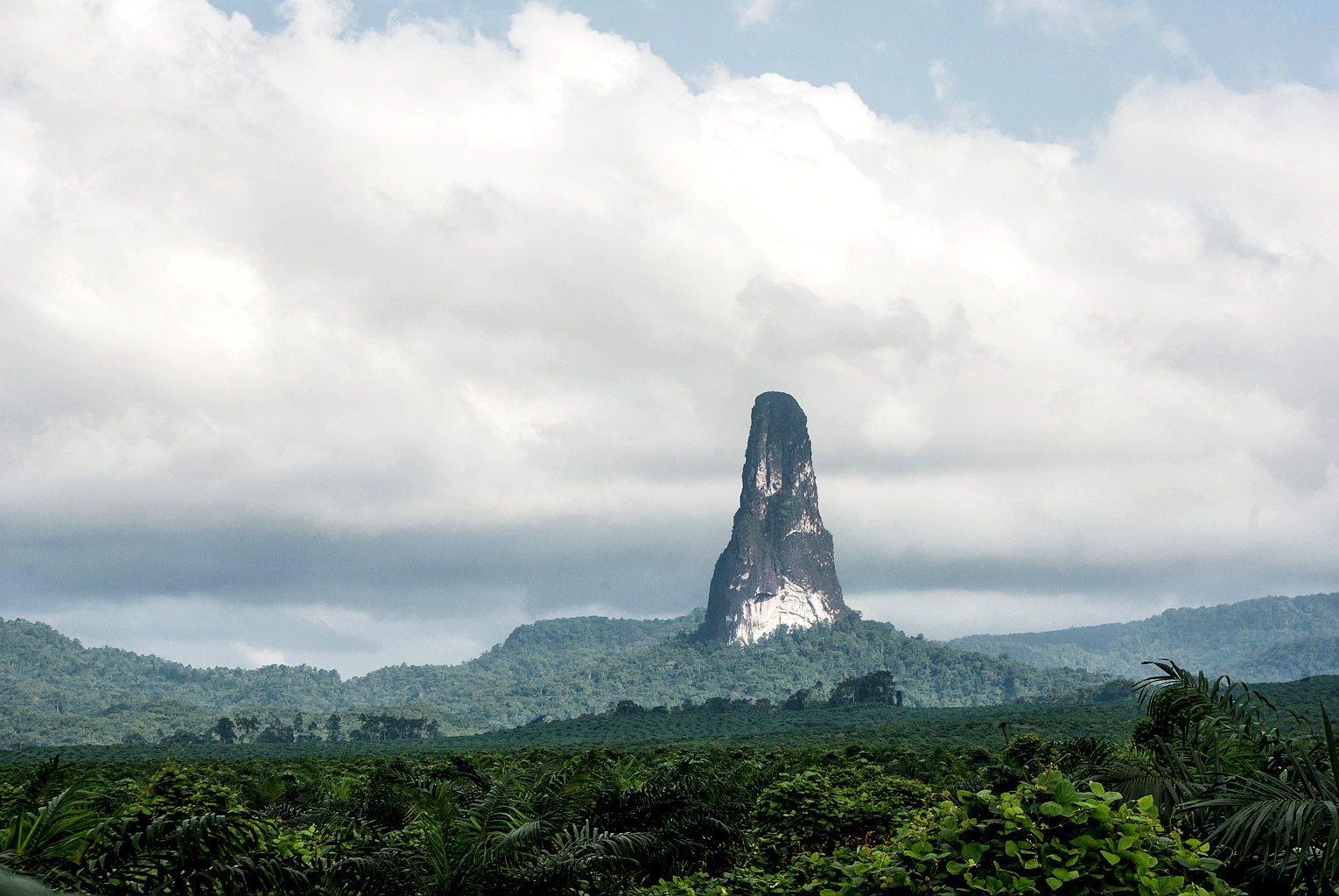
Pico Cão Grande, São Tomé Island

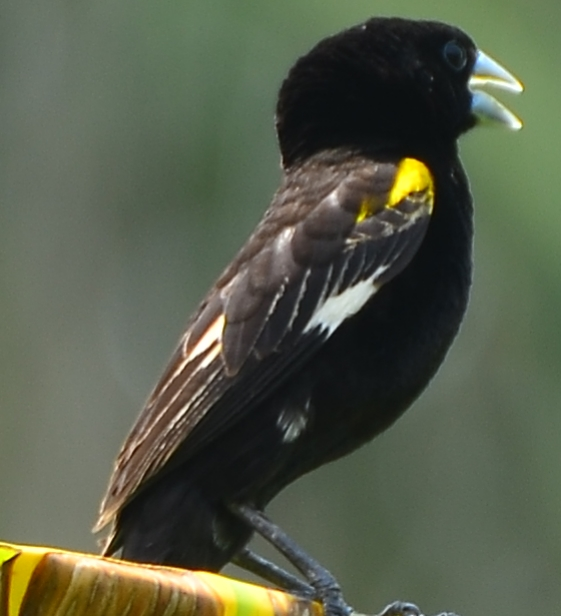
Fauna in Lobata District, São Tomé

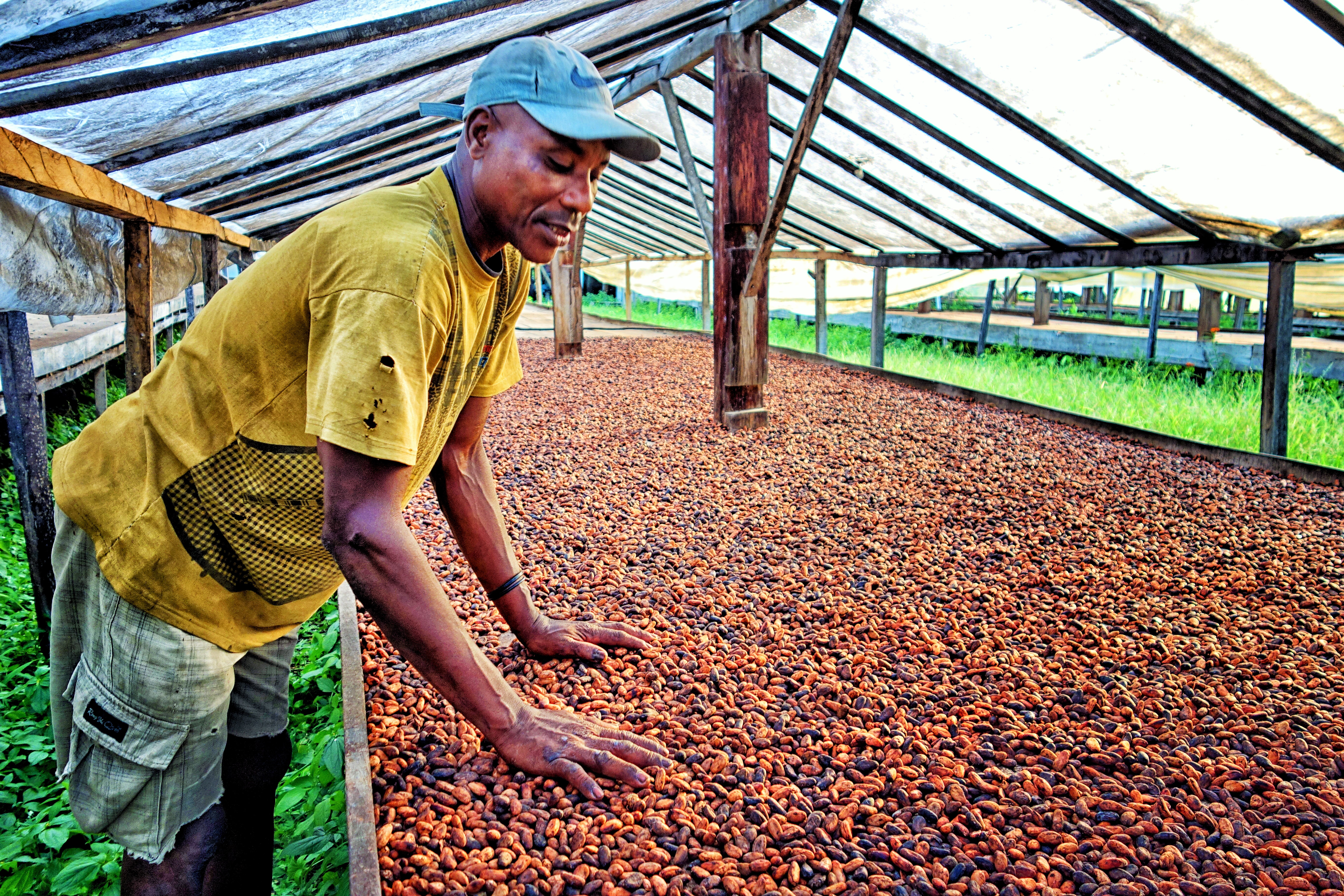
Cocoa production in São Tomé

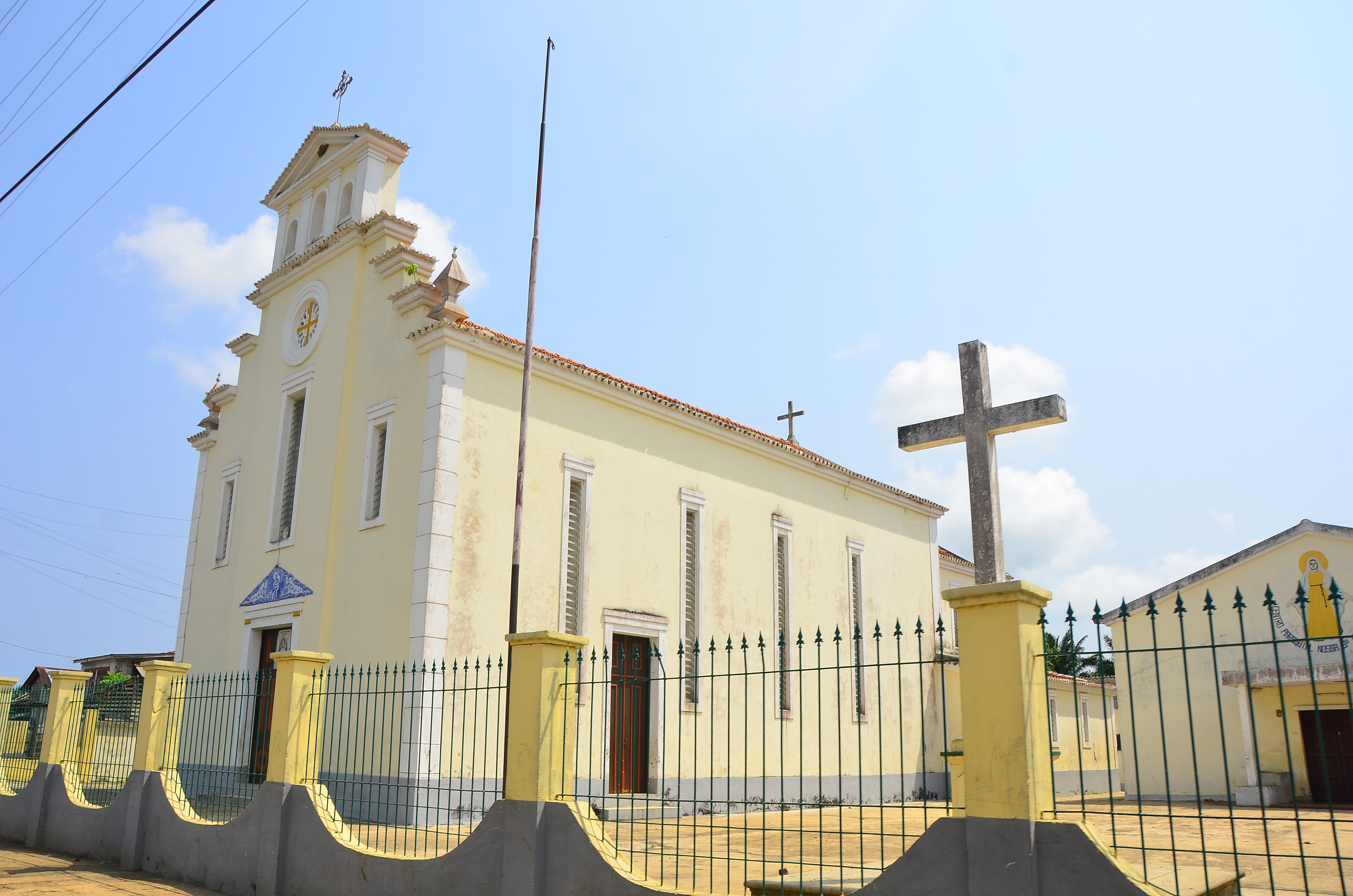
Igreja de Nossa Senhora de Guadalupe, in Guadalupe, São Tomé Island.

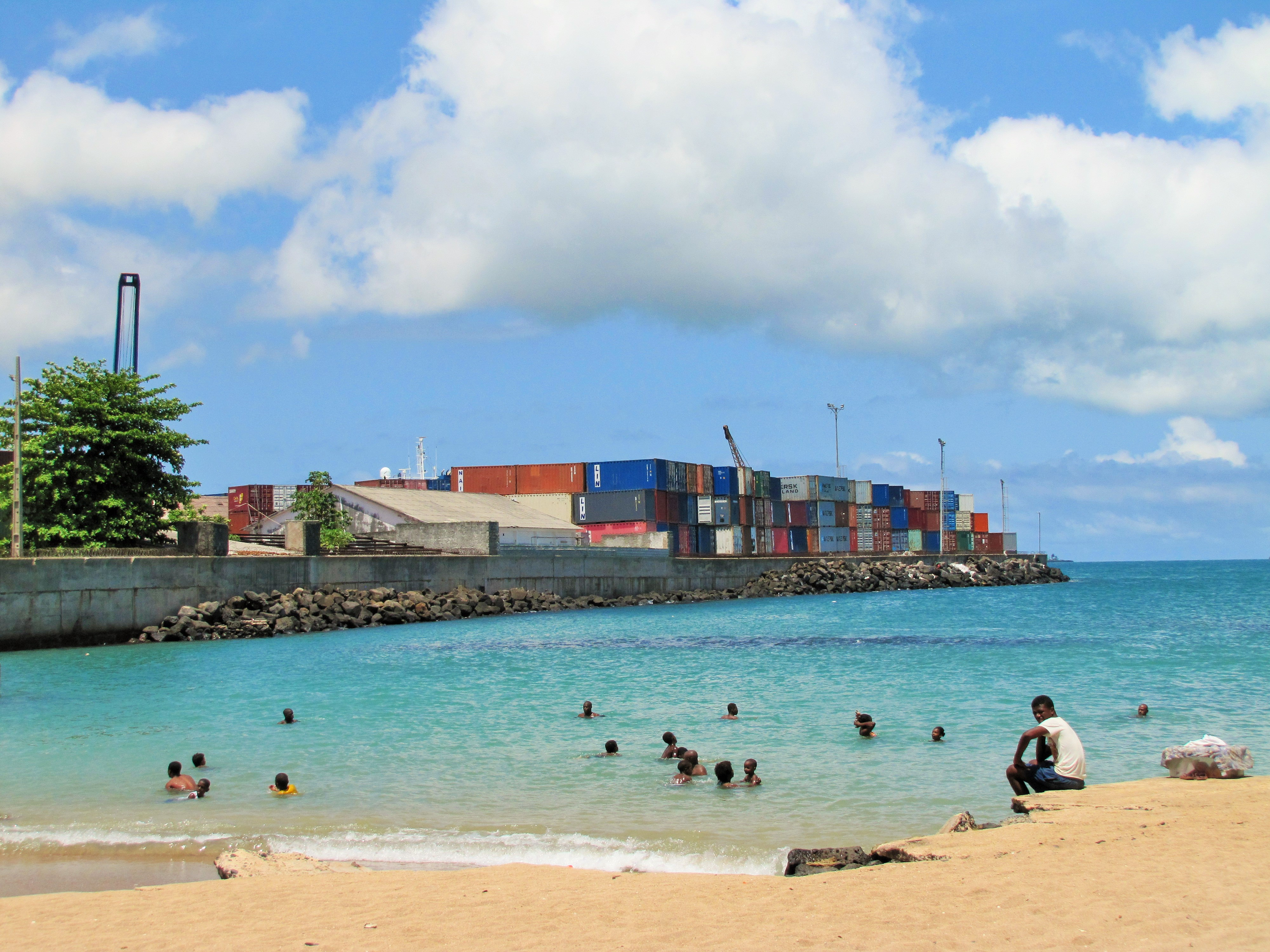
São Tomé

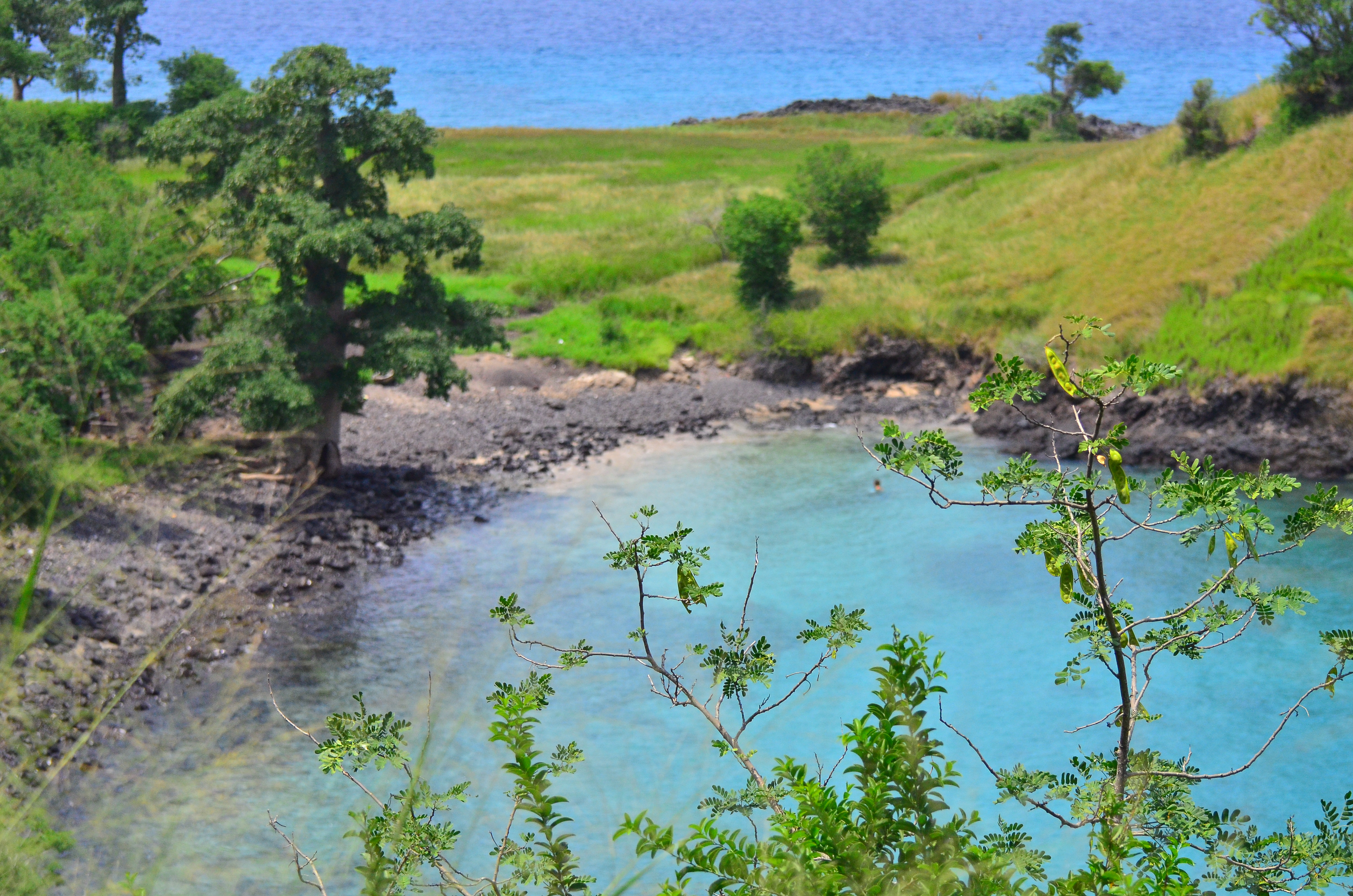
Lagoa Azul, STP

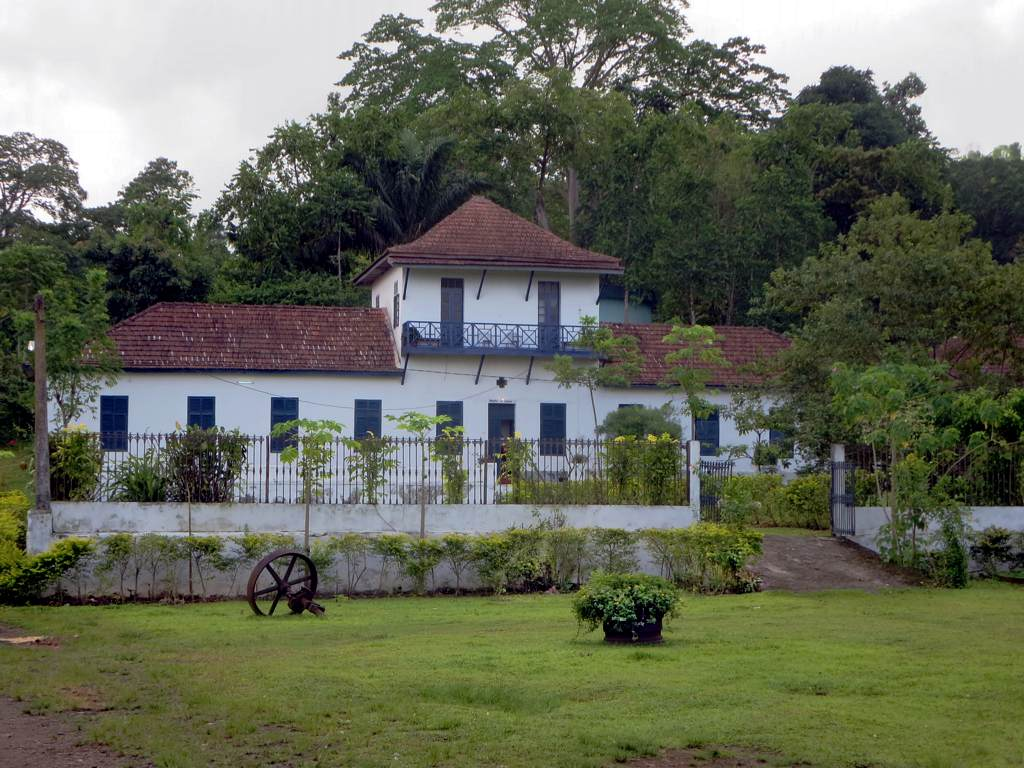
One of the traditional Roças in São Tomé and Príncipe

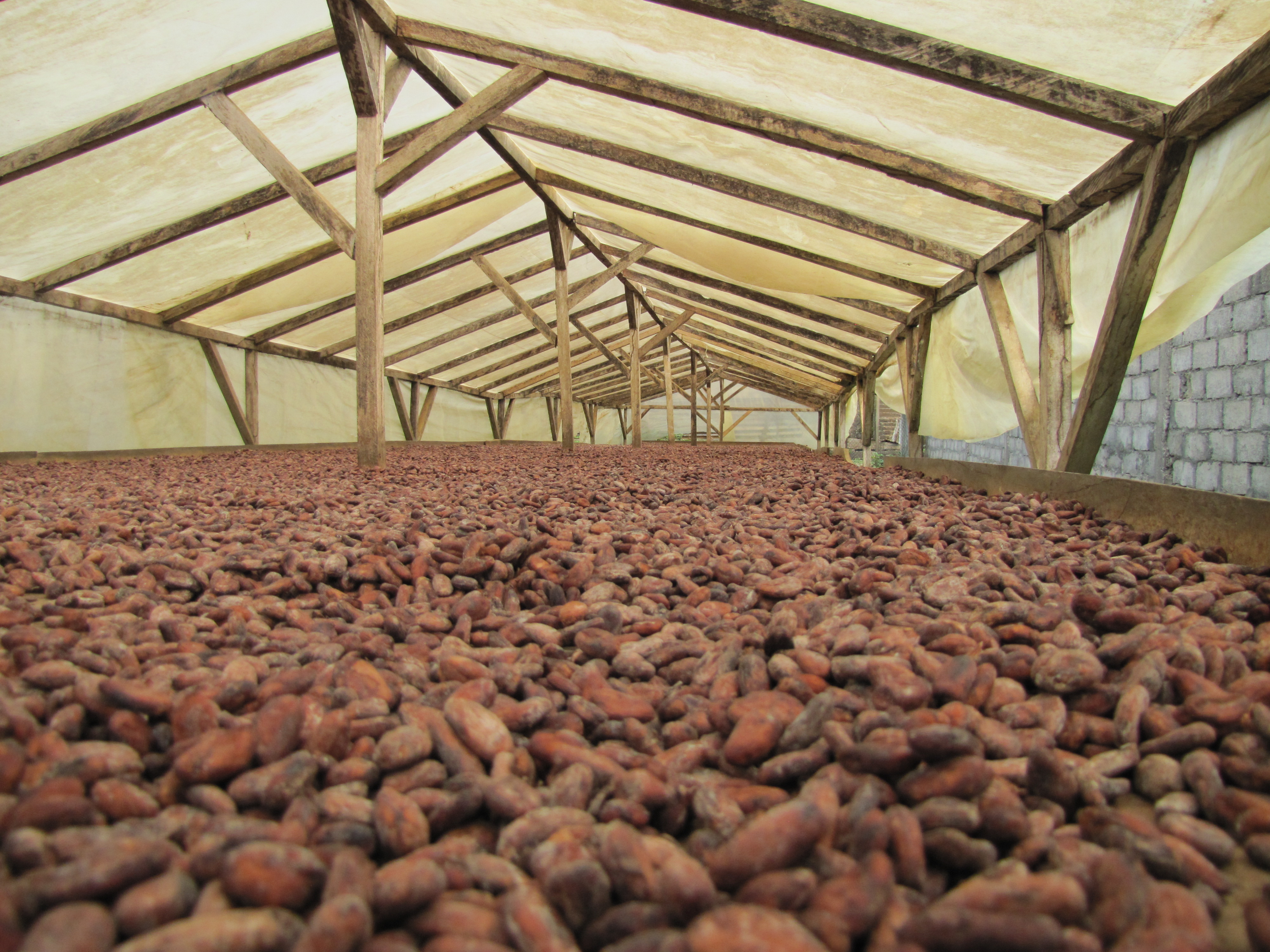
Cocoa beans drying, São Tomé

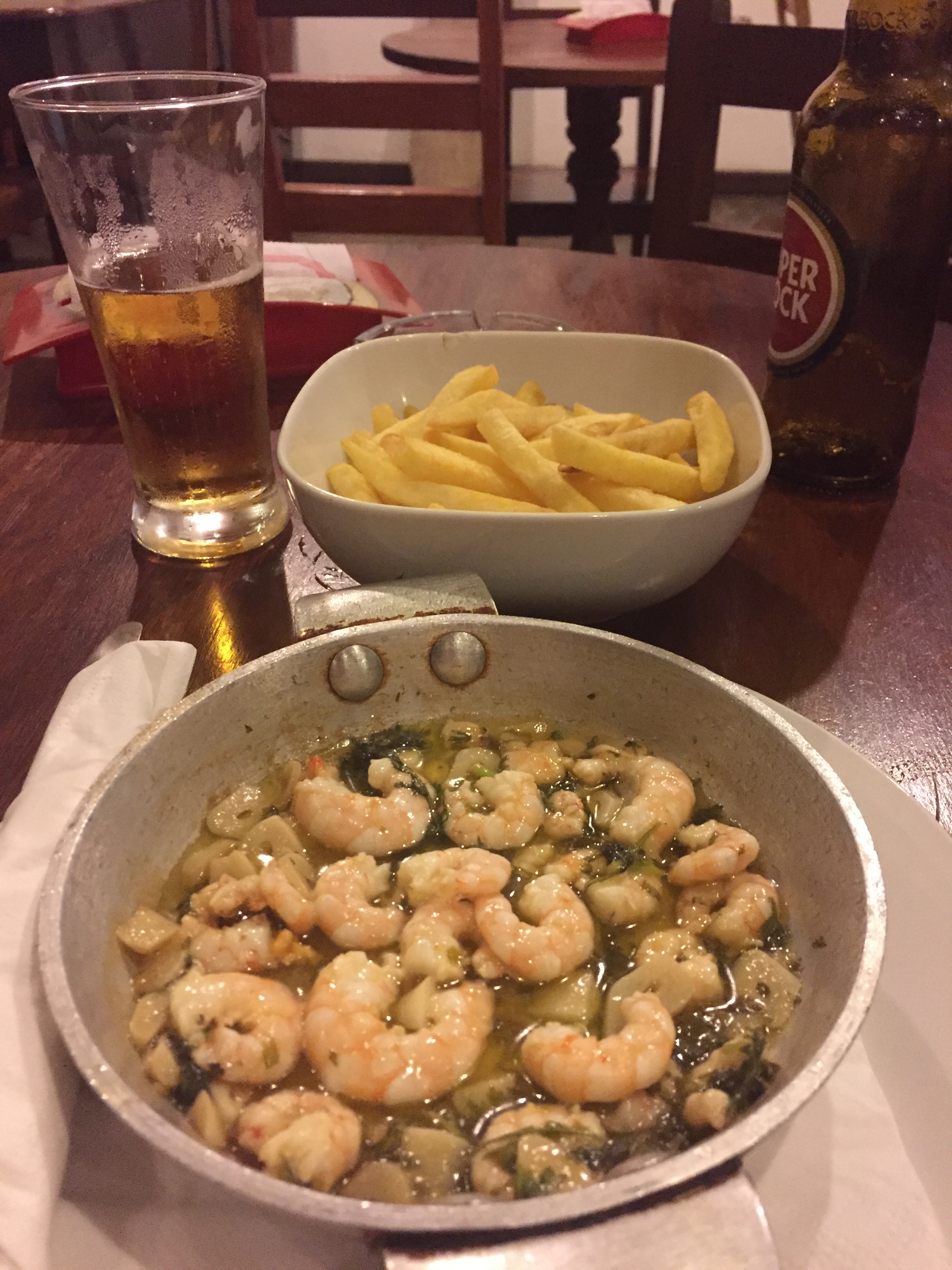
Shrimp and French fries as served in a local hotel, São Tomé

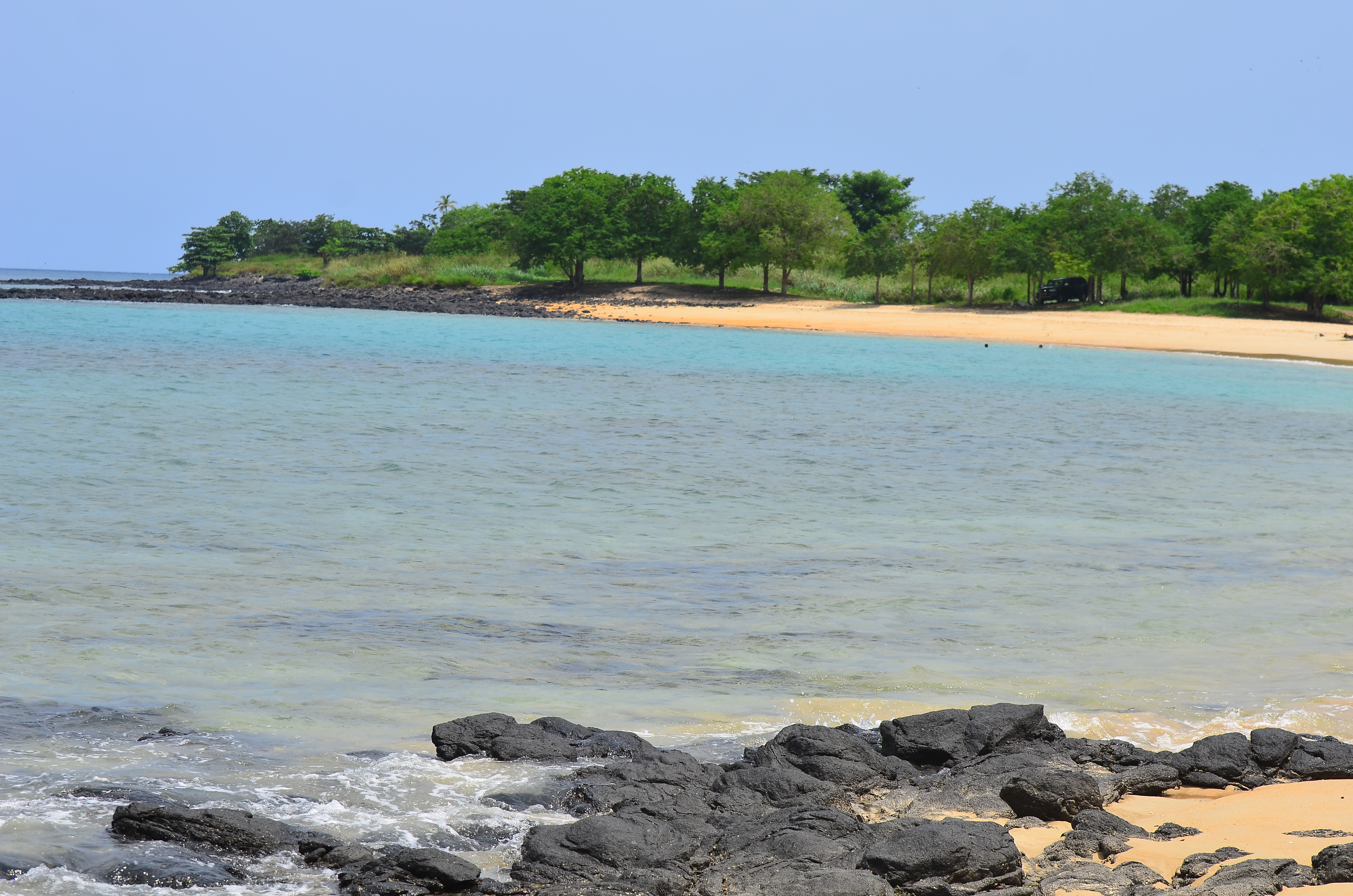
Guadalupe, São Tomé

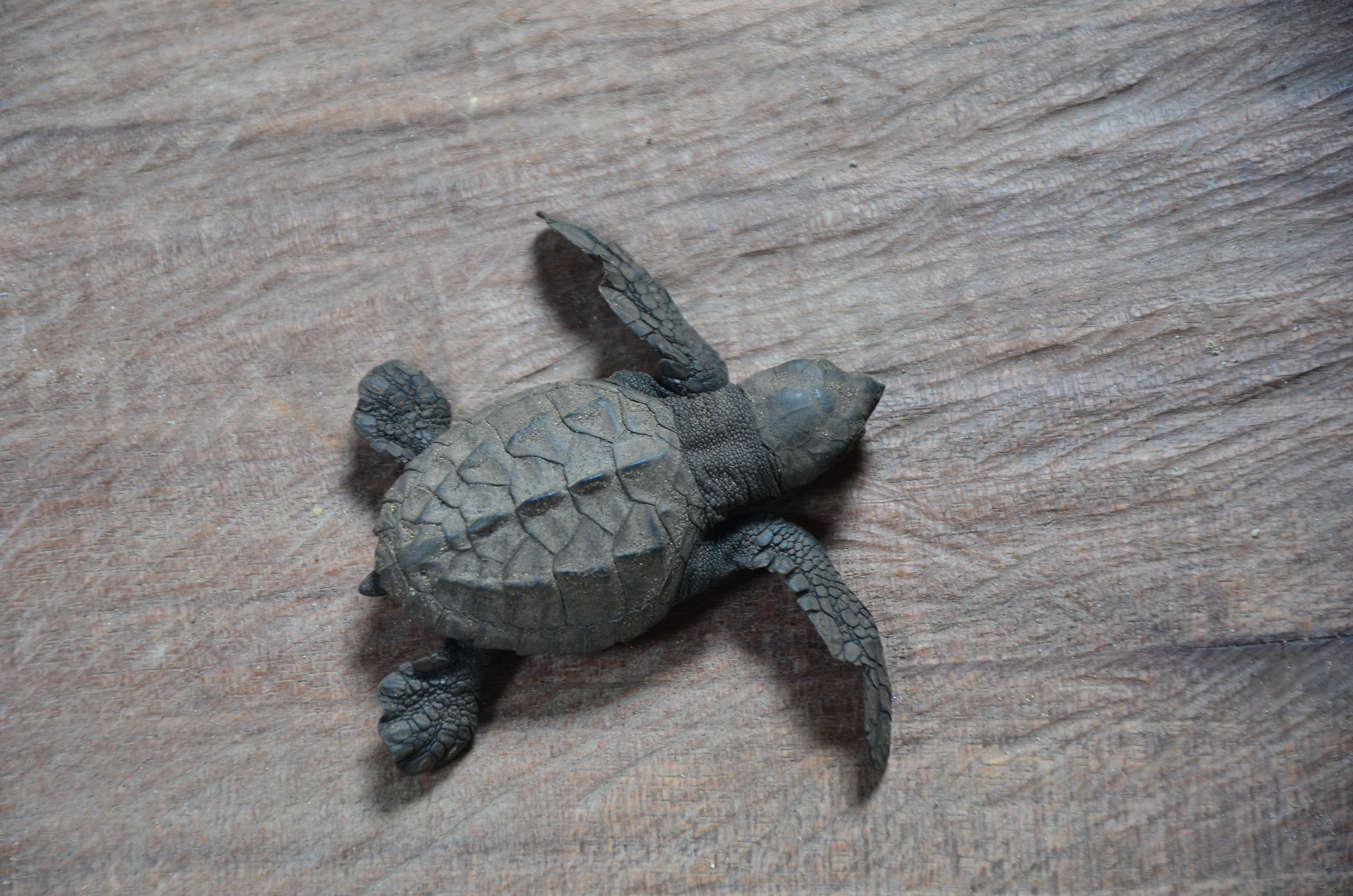
Sea turtle as seen in São Tomé Island

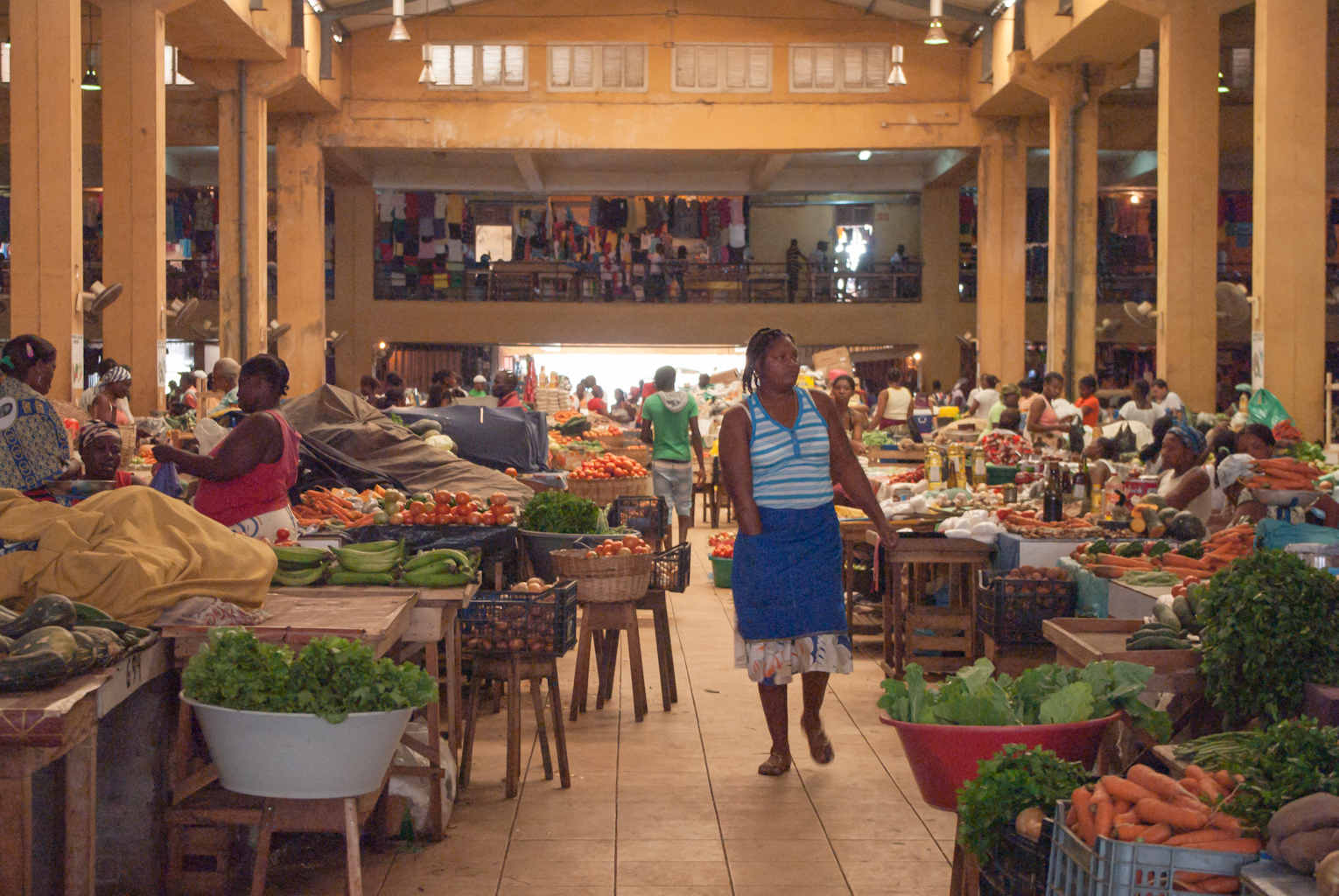
Municipal market of São Tomé City
