= List of birds of Ireland =

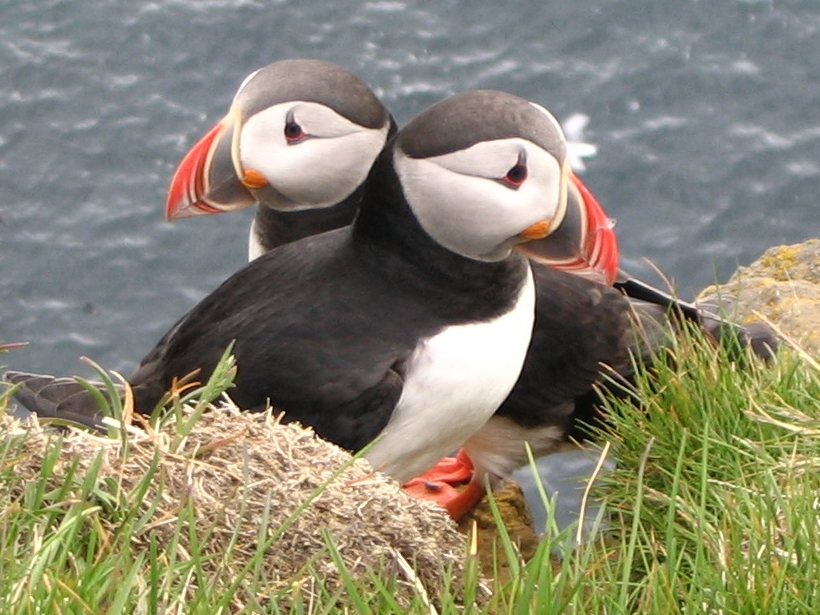
Atlantic puffins nest in colonies around the coast.

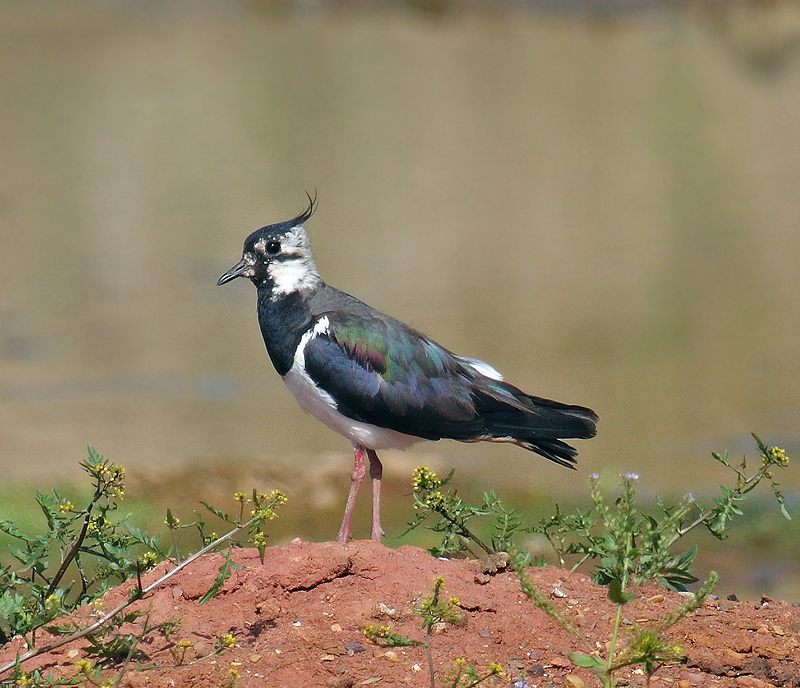
The northern lapwing

The avifauna of Ireland included a total of 522 species as of the end of 2019 according to the Irish Rare Birds Committee (IRBC). Of them, 183 are rare, and 14 of the rarities have not been seen in Ireland since 1950. Three species were either introduced to Ireland or came to Ireland from another introduced population.

Ireland has a relatively low diversity of breeding birds due to its isolation. Several species such as the tawny owl, Eurasian nuthatch and willow tit which breed in Great Britain have not been recorded. However, there are large colonies of seabirds including important populations of European storm-petrels, northern gannets, and roseate terns. Other notable breeding birds include corn crakes and red-billed choughs. There are no endemic species but there are endemic subspecies of white-throated dipper, coal tit, and Eurasian jay.

Large numbers of wildfowl and waders winter in Ireland, attracted by its mild climate. About half the world population of the Greenland race of greater white-fronted geese spend the winter there. During autumn, many migrating seabirds can be seen off the coasts including several species of skuas, shearwaters, and petrels. Ireland's westerly position means that North American birds are regularly recorded in autumn.

This list's taxonomic treatment (designation and sequence of orders, families and species) and nomenclature (English and scientific names) are those of the International Ornithological Congress (IOC) as of July 2021. Many of the Irish names are taken from the National Terminology Database for Irish.

The following A, B, and C tags are used by the IRBC to define the status of species. "R" is used here for rare species. The list does not include species placed in "Category D" by the IRBC. These are species where there is doubt as to whether they have occurred in a wild state (Category D1), they have arrived by human assistance such as on board a ship (D2), they have only been recorded dead on the tideline (D3), or they are feral species whose populations may not be self-sustaining (D4). Some species have records of individuals in more than one category; the "highest" category is listed here in those cases.

- A - "Species that have been recorded in an apparently natural state in Ireland at least once since 1st January 1950".
- B - "Species that have been recorded in an apparently natural state in Ireland at least once up to 31st December 1949, but have not been recorded subsequently", i.e. old vagrant records and/or regionally extinct species.
- C - "Species that, although originally introduced by man, have established feral breeding populations in Ireland which apparently maintain themselves without necessary recourse to further introduction [and species] that have occurred, but are considered to have originated from established naturalised populations outside Ireland".
- R - Species on IRBC Appendix 1, those "requiring substantiating details", i.e. rarities.

== Ducks, geese, swans ==
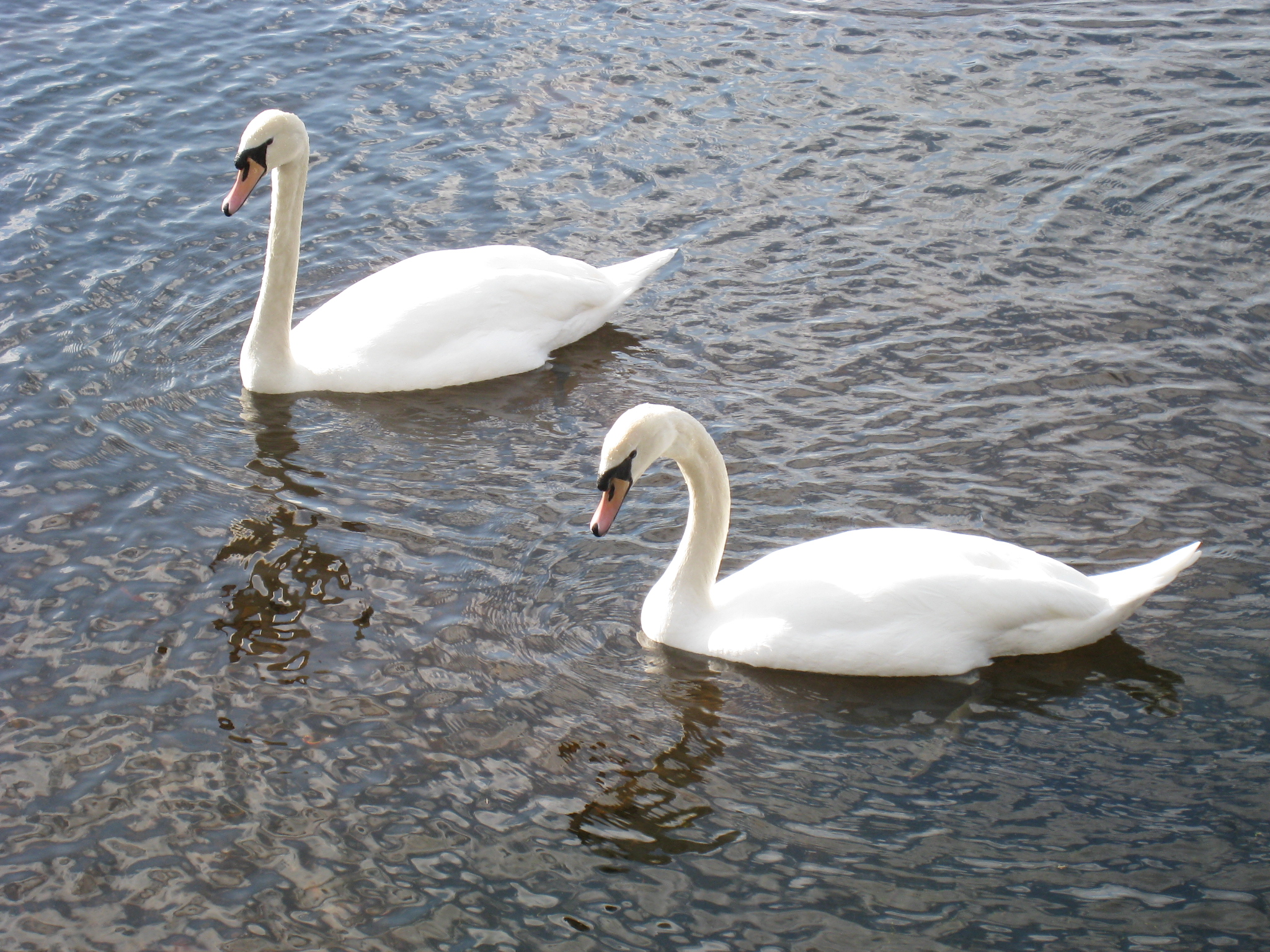
Mute swans on Lough Leane.

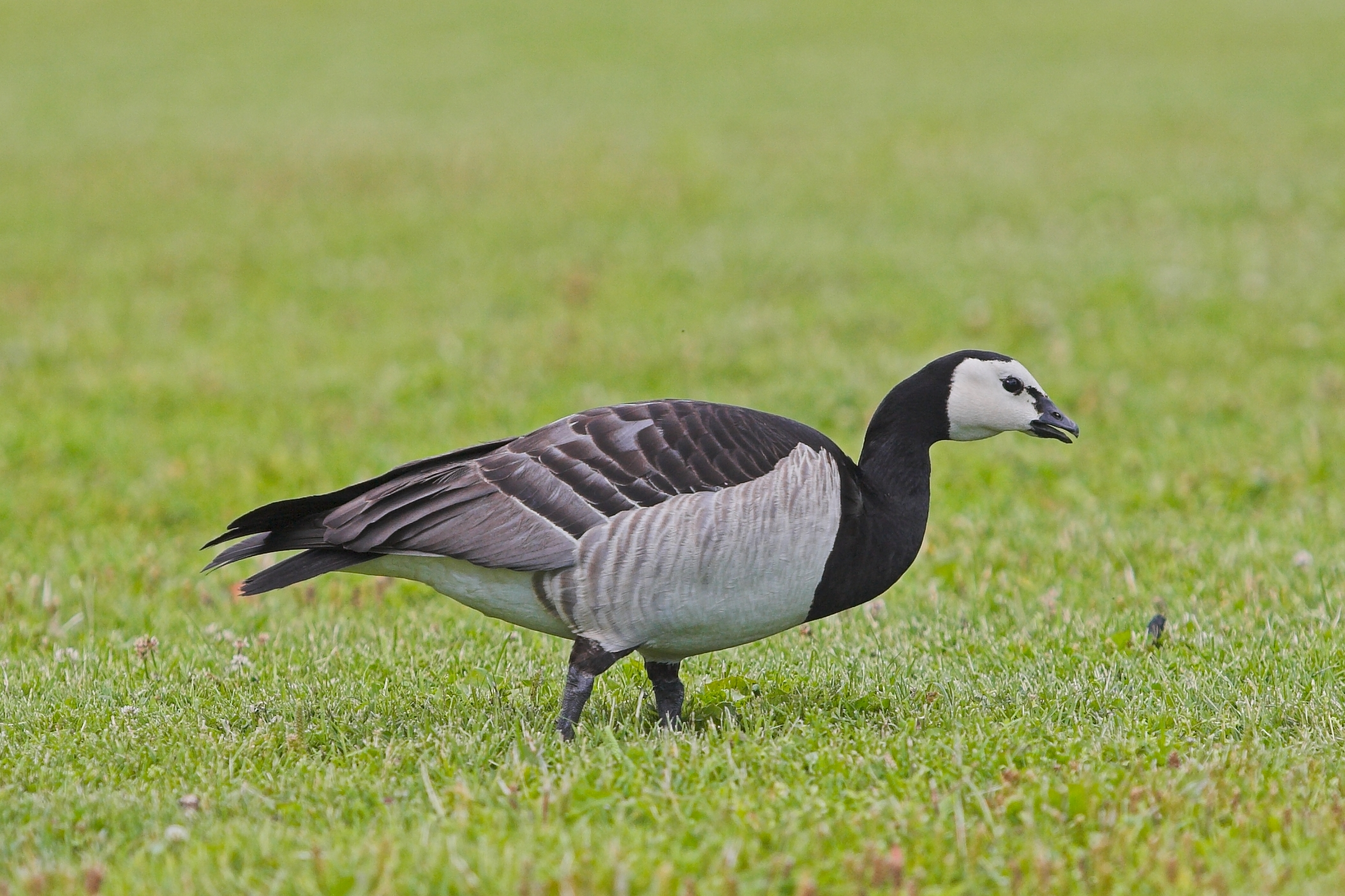
Barnacle goose, a winter visitor from Greenland.

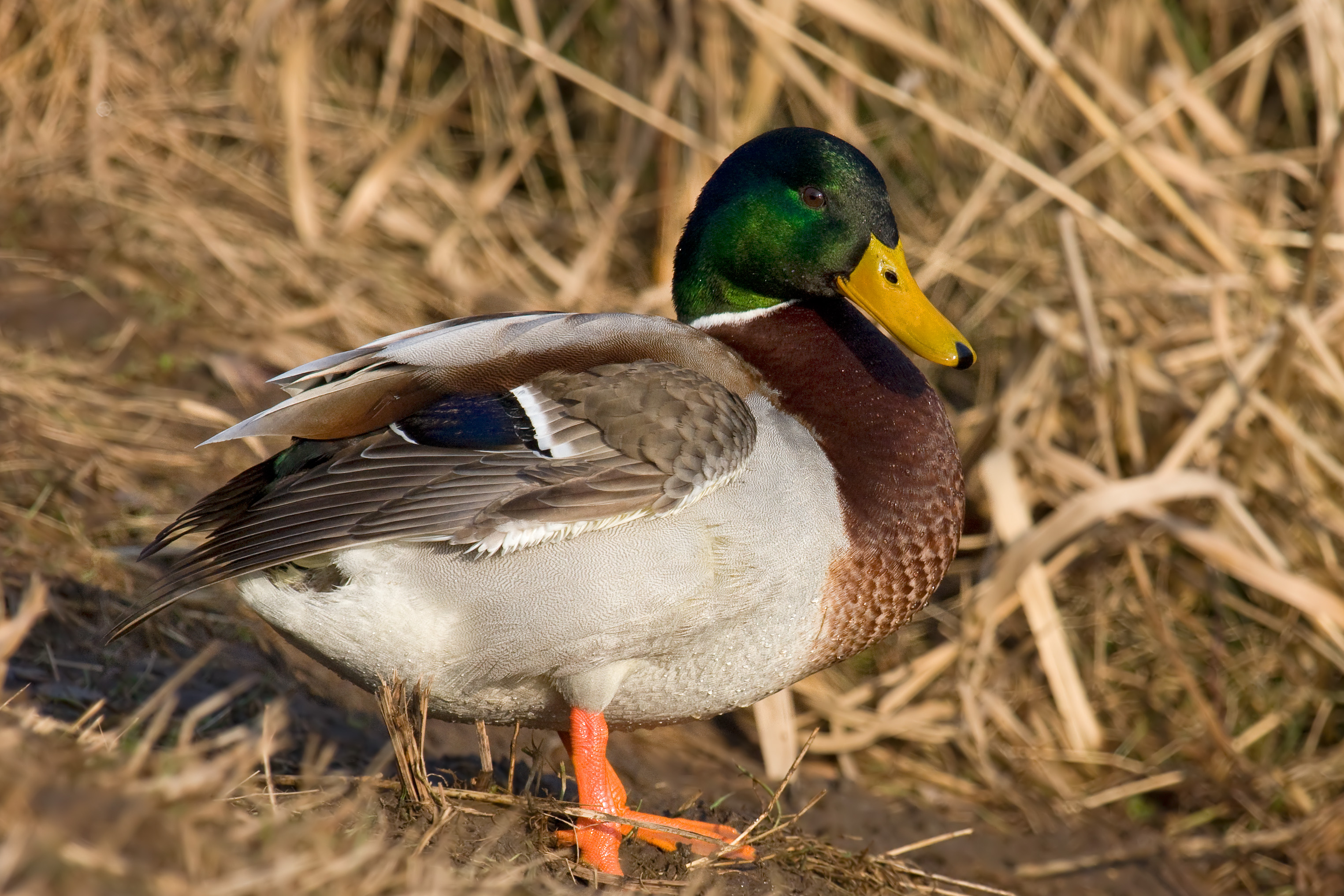
Mallard, a very common resident.

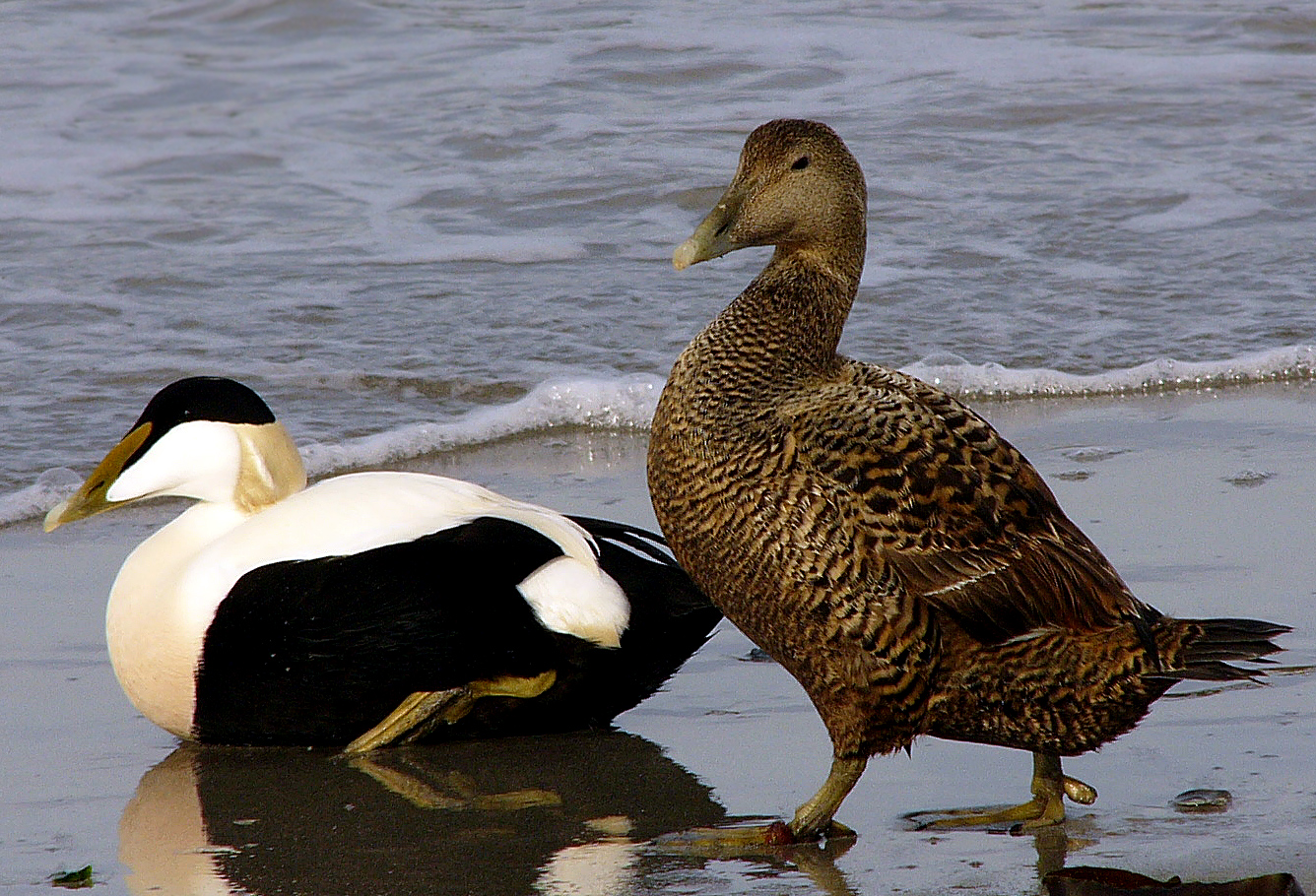
Eiders, common on northern coasts.

Order: Anseriformes Family: Anatidae

Anatidae includes the ducks and most duck-like waterfowl, such as geese and swans. These birds are adapted to an aquatic existence with webbed feet, flattened bills, and feathers that are excellent at shedding water due to an oily coating.

Common name	Binomial	Irish name	Status
Brent goose	Branta bernicla	Cadhan	A
Red-breasted goose	Branta ruficollis	Gé broinnrua	A R
Canada goose	Branta canadensis	Gé cheanadach	A R
Barnacle goose	Branta leucopsis	Gé ghiúrainn / cadhan	A
Cackling goose	Branta hutchinsii	Brioscarnach-ghé	A R
Snow goose	Anser caerulescens	Gé shneachta	A
Greylag goose	Anser anser	Crann-ghé / gé mhór fhionn / gé ghlas	A
Taiga bean goose	Anser fabalis	Síolghé taigaí	A R
Pink-footed goose	Anser brachyrhynchus	Gé ghobghearr	A
Tundra bean goose	Anser serrirostris	Síolghé tundraí	A R
Greater white-fronted goose	Anser albifrons	Gé bhánéadanach mhór	A
Lesser white-fronted goose	Anser erythropus	Mionghé bhánéadanach / gé bheag fhionn	A R
Mute swan	Cygnus olor	Eala bhalbh	A
Bewick's swan	Cygnus columbianus bewickii	Eala thundra	A
Whooper swan	Cygnus cygnus	Eala ghlórach	A
Common shelduck	Tadorna tadorna	Seil-lacha	A
Ruddy shelduck	Tadorna ferruginea	Seil-lacha rua / garg ruadh	B
Mandarin duck	Aix galericulata	Lacha mhandarin	C
Baikal teal	Sibirionetta formosa	Praslacha bhaicalach	A R
Garganey	Spatula querquedula	Praslacha shamraidh	A
Blue-winged teal	Spatula discors	Praslacha ghormeiteach	A R
Northern shoveler	Spatula clypeata	Slapaire tuaisceartach	A
Gadwall	Mareca strepera	Gadual	A
Eurasian wigeon	Mareca penelope	Rualacha	A
American wigeon	Mareca americana	Rualacha mhericeánach	A
Mallard	Anas platyrhynchos	Mallard	A
American black duck	Anas rubripes	Lacha chosrua	A R
Northern pintail	Anas acuta	Biorearrach tuaisceartach	A
Eurasian teal	Anas crecca	Praslacha ghlaseiteach	A
Green-winged teal	Anas carolinensis		A
Red-crested pochard	Netta rufina	Póiseard cíordhearg	A
Redhead	Aythya americana	Ceanndearg	A R
Common pochard	Aythya ferina	Póiseard cíordhearg / lacha mhásach	A
Ferruginous duck	Aythya nyroca	Póiseard ferruginous	A R
Ring-necked duck	Aythya collaris	Lacha mhuinceach	A
Tufted duck	Aythya fuligula	Lacha bhadánach	A
Greater scaup	Aythya marila	Lacha iascán mór	A
Lesser scaup	Aythya affinis	Mionlacha iascán	A R
King eider	Somateria spectabilis	Éadar taibhseach / rígh éadar	A R
Common eider	Somateria mollissima	Éadar	A
Surf scoter	Melanitta perspicillata	Scótar toinne	A
Velvet scoter	Melanitta fusca	Sceadach	A
White-winged scoter	Melanitta deglandi	Scótarach bháneiteach	A R
Common scoter	Melanitta nigra	Scótar / lacha scótarach	A
Black scoter	Melanitta americana	Scótar dubh	A R
Long-tailed duck	Clangula hyemalis	Lacha earrfhada	A
Bufflehead	Bucephala albeola	Órshúileach ceannsceadach	A R
Common goldeneye	Bucephala clangula	Órshúileach	A
Barrow's goldeneye	Bucephala islandica	Órshúileach bhearú	A R
Smew	Mergellus albellus	Síolta gheal	A
Hooded merganser	Lophodytes cucullatus	Síolta chochaill	A R
Goosander	Mergus merganser	Síolta / tumaire	A
Red-breasted merganser	Mergus serrator	Síolta rua	A
Ruddy duck	Oxyura jamaicensis	Lachra rua	C

== Pheasants and allies ==
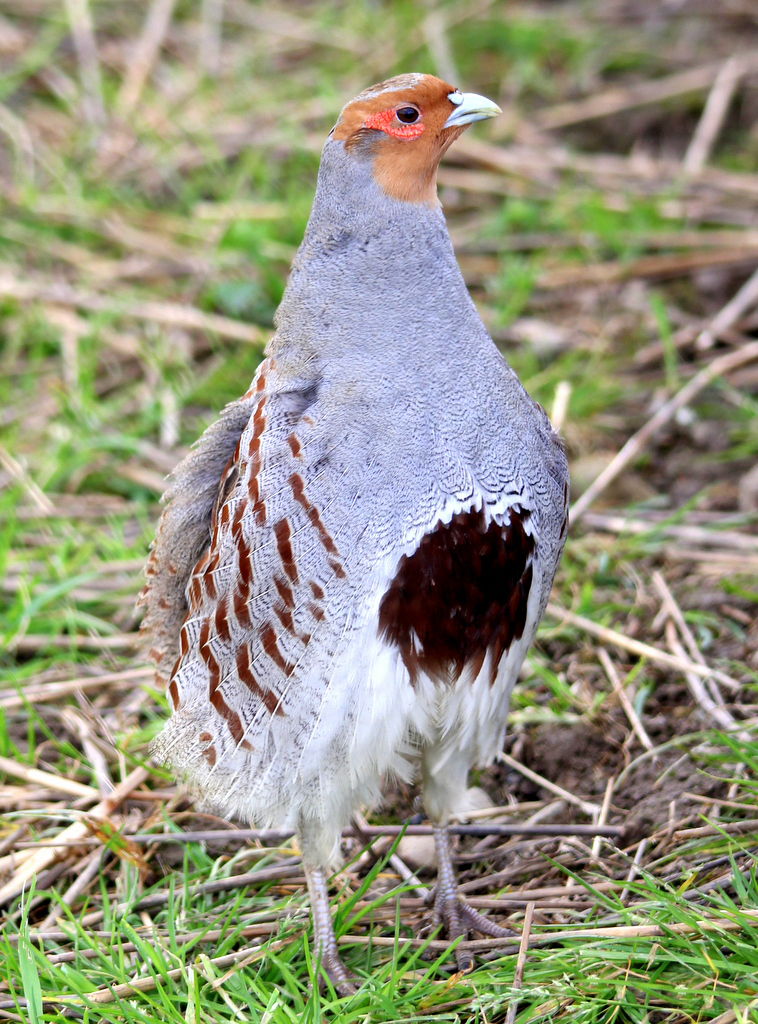
The grey partridge has seriously declined and is now very rare.

Order: Galliformes Family: Phasianidae

The Phasianidae are a family of terrestrial birds which consists of quails, partridges, snowcocks, francolins, spurfowls, tragopans, monals, pheasants, peafowls, and jungle fowls. In general, they are plump (although they vary in size) and have broad, relatively short wings.

Common name	Binomial	Irish name	Status
Western capercaillie	Tetrao urogallus	Capall coille	B
Red grouse	Lagopus scotica	Tarmachan	A
Grey partridge	Perdix perdix	Cearc coille	A
Common quail	Coturnix coturnix	Gearg / gearraghuirt	A
Common pheasant	Phasianus colchicus	Feasán mhuinceach	C

== Nightjars ==
Order: Caprimulgiformes Family: Caprimulgidae

Nightjars are medium-sized nocturnal birds that usually nest on the ground. They have long wings, short legs, and very short bills. Most have small feet, of little use for walking, and long pointed wings. Their soft plumage is camouflaged to resemble bark or leaves.

Common name	Binomial	Irish name	Status
European nightjar	Caprimulgus europaeus	Tuirne lín	A
Common nighthawk	Chordeiles minor	Tuirne lín Meiriceánach	A R

== Swifts ==
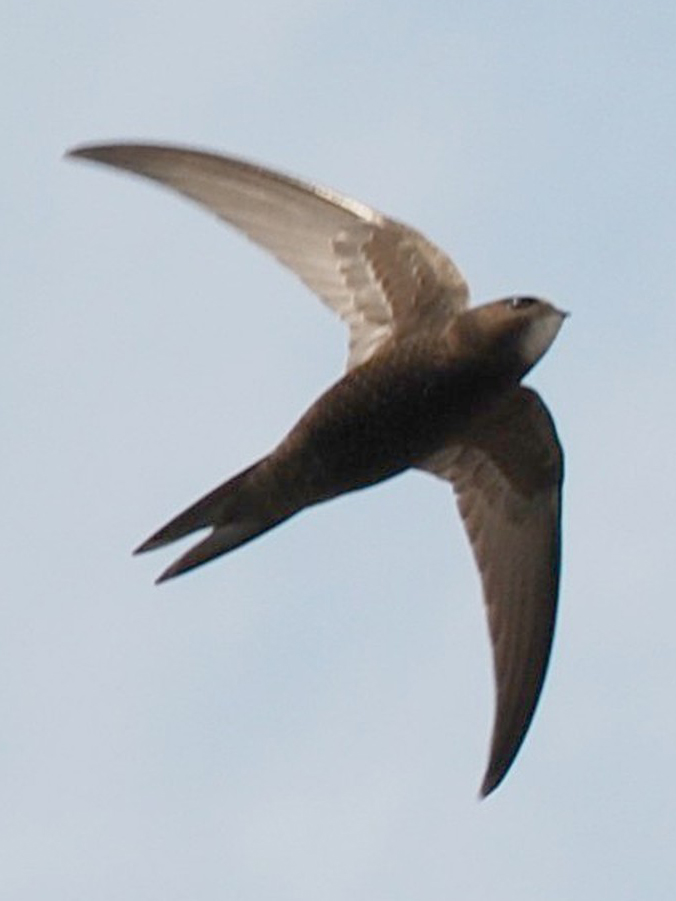
Common swift, a summer visitor.

Order: Apodiformes Family: Apodidae

Swifts are small birds which spend the majority of their lives flying. These birds have very short legs and never settle voluntarily on the ground, perching instead only on vertical surfaces. Many swifts have long swept-back wings which resemble a crescent or boomerang.

Common name	Binomial	Irish name	Status
White-throated needletail	Hirundapus caudacutus	Gabhlán earrspíonach	A R
Chimney swift	Chaetura pelagica	Gabhlán simléir	A R
Alpine swift	Tachymarptis melba	Gabhlán alpach	A
Common swift	Apus apus	Gabhlán gaoithe	A
Pallid swift	Apus pallidus	Gabhlán bánlíoch	A R
Little swift	Apus affinis	Gabhlán beag	A R

== Bustards ==
Order: Otidiformes Family: Otididae

Bustards are large terrestrial birds mainly associated with dry open country and steppes in the Old World. They are omnivorous and nest on the ground. They walk steadily on strong legs and big toes, pecking for food as they go. They have long broad wings with "fingered" wingtips and striking patterns in flight. Many have interesting mating displays.

Common name	Binomial	Irish name	Status
Great bustard	Otis tarda	Bustard mór	B R
Little bustard	Tetrax tetrax	Bustard beag	B R

== Cuckoos ==
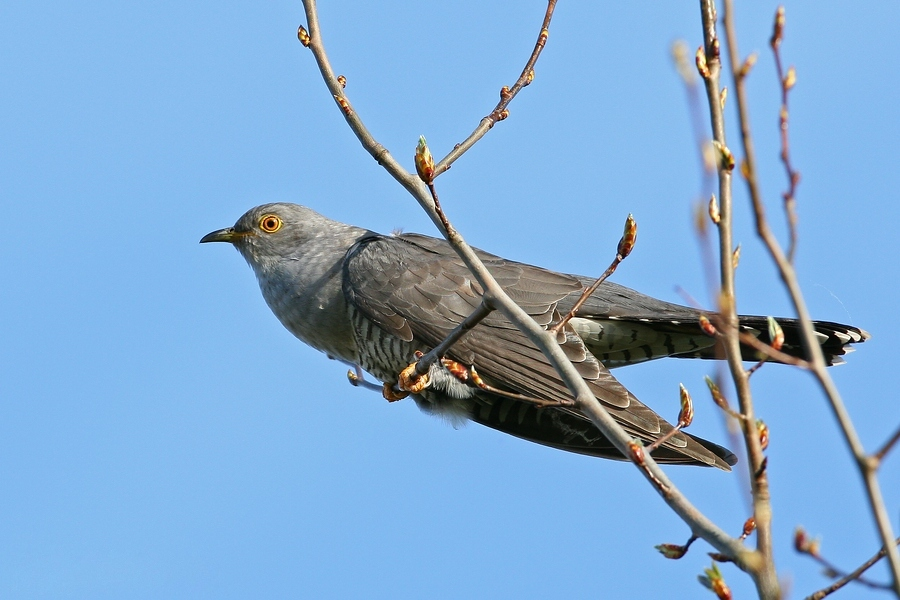
Common cuckoo, a declining summer visitor.

Order: Cuculiformes Family: Cuculidae

The family Cuculidae includes cuckoos, roadrunners, and anis. These birds are of variable size with slender bodies, long tails, and strong legs. The Old World cuckoos are brood parasites.

Common name	Binomial	Irish name	Status
Great spotted cuckoo	Clamator glandarius	Mórchuach bhreac	A R
Yellow-billed cuckoo	Coccyzus americanus	Cuach ghob-bhuí	A R
Black-billed cuckoo	Coccyzus erythropthalmus	Cuach bhobdhubh	B R
Common cuckoo	Cuculus canorus	Cuach	A

== Sandgrouse ==
Order: Pterocliformes Family: Pteroclidae

Sandgrouse have small, pigeon-like heads and necks, but sturdy compact bodies. They have long pointed wings and sometimes tails and a fast direct flight. Flocks fly to watering holes at dawn and dusk. Their legs are feathered down to the toes.

Common name	Binomial	Irish name	Status
Pallas's sandgrouse	Syrrhaptes paradoxus	Gaineamhchearc	A R

== Pigeons and doves ==
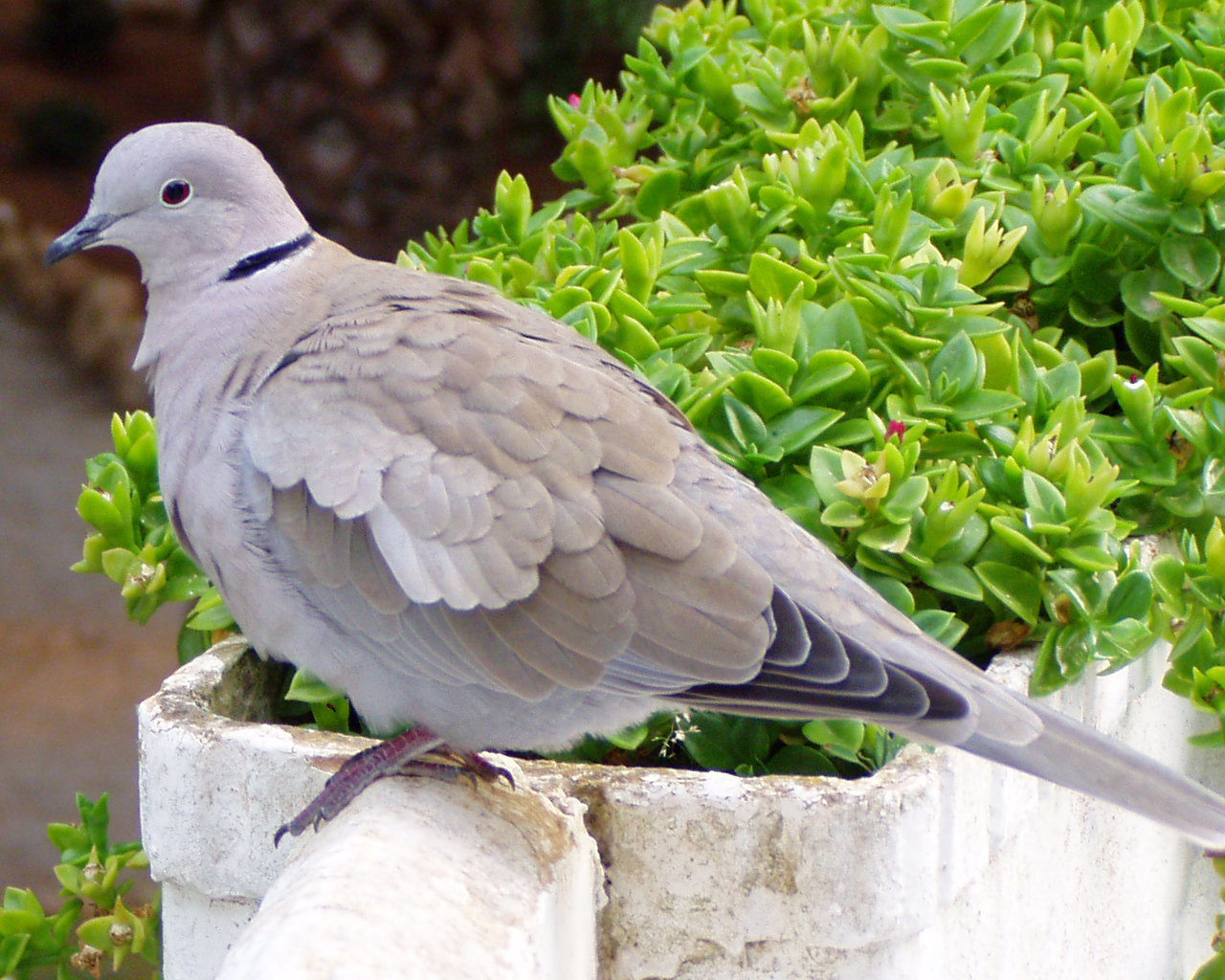
Eurasian collared dove, first recorded in 1959 and now common.

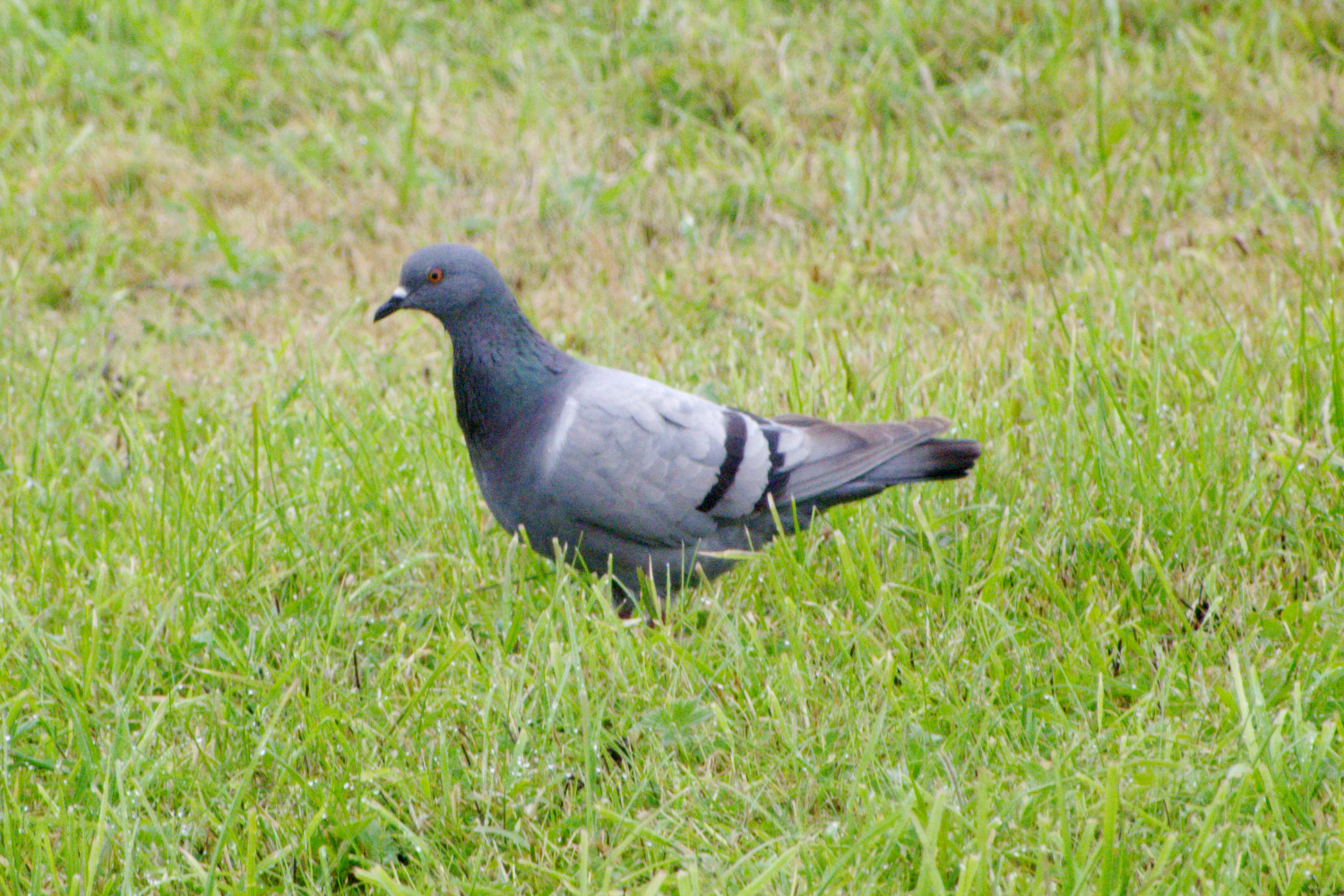
Wild native rock doves live on cliffs near the Atlantic Ocean. Feral birds are widespread.

Order: Columbiformes Family: Columbidae

Pigeons and doves are stout-bodied birds with short necks and short slender bills with a fleshy cere.

Common name	Binomial	Irish name	Status
Rock dove	Columba livia	Colm aille	A
Stock dove	Columba oenas	Colm gorm	A
Common wood pigeon	Columba palumbus	Colm coille	A
European turtle dove	Streptopelia turtur	Fearán	A
Eurasian collared dove	Streptopelia decaocto	Fearán baicdhubh	A
Mourning dove	Zenaida macroura	Fearán gubhach	A R

== Rails, crakes and coots ==
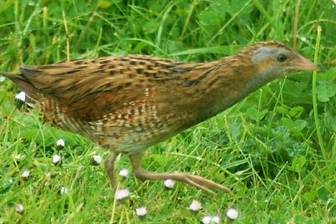
Corn crake, now a rare summer visitor but formerly very common.

Order: Gruiformes Family: Rallidae

Rallidae is a large family of small to medium-sized birds which includes the rails, crakes, coots, and gallinules. Typically they inhabit dense vegetation in damp environments near lakes, swamps, or rivers. In general they are shy and secretive birds, making them difficult to observe. Most species have strong legs and long toes which are well adapted to soft uneven surfaces. They tend to have short, rounded wings and to be weak fliers.

Common name	Binomial	Irish name	Status
Water rail	Rallus aquaticus	Rálóg uisce / tradhna uisce	A
Corn crake	Crex crex	Traonach	A
Sora	Porzana carolina	Gearr sora	A R
Spotted crake	Porzana porzana	Gearr breac	A
Common moorhen	Gallinula chloropus	Cearc uisce / truisc / coileach fraoich	A
Eurasian coot	Fulica atra	Cearc cheannann	A
American coot	Fulica americana	Cearc mheiriceánach	A R
Allen's gallinule	Porphyrio alleni		A R
Purple gallinule	Porphyrio martinica	Cearcóg	A R
Baillon's crake	Zapornia pusilla	Gearr biorra	A R
Little crake	Zapornia parva	Gearr beag	B R

== Cranes ==
Order: Gruiformes Family: Gruidae

Cranes are large, long-legged, and long-necked birds. Unlike the similar-looking but unrelated herons, cranes fly with necks outstretched, not pulled back. Most have elaborate and noisy courting displays or "dances".

Common name	Binomial	Irish name	Status
Sandhill crane	Antiogne canadensis	Corr ceanadach	B R
Common crane	Grus grus	Corr / grús	A

== Grebes ==
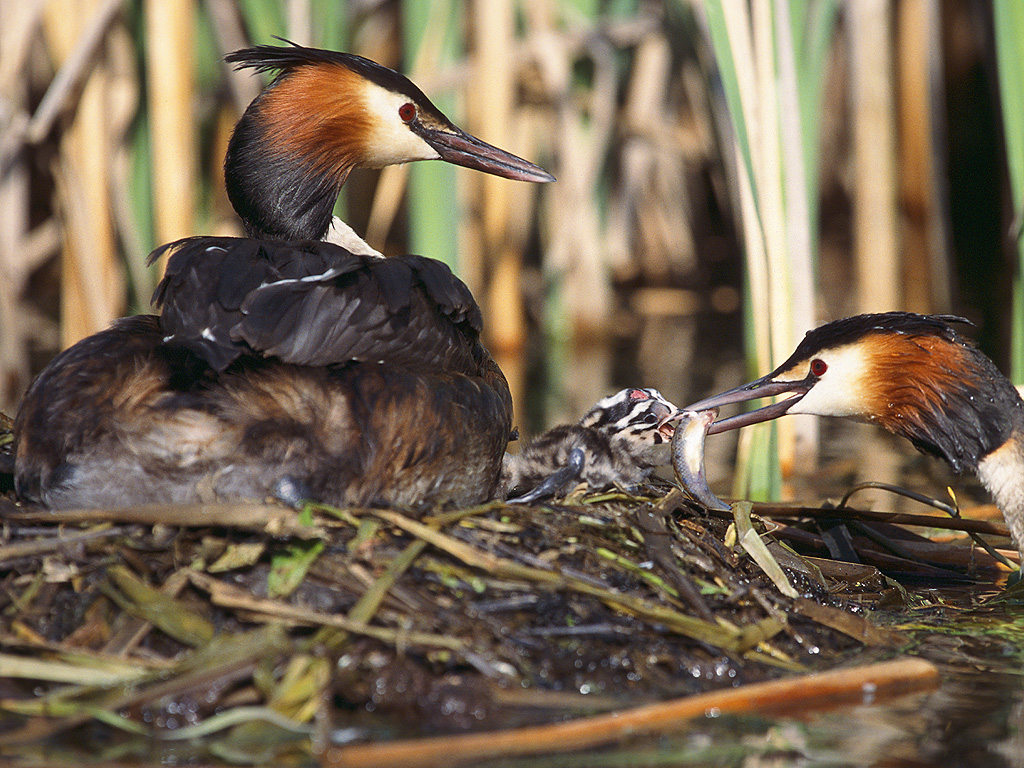
Great crested grebes breed on inland lakes.

Order: Podicipediformes Family: Podicipedidae

Grebes are small to medium-large freshwater diving birds. They have lobed toes and are excellent swimmers and divers. However, they have their feet placed far back on the body, making them quite ungainly on land.

Common name	Binomial	Irish name	Status
Little grebe	Tachybaptus ruficollis	Spágaire tonn / tomaire beag	A
Pied-billed grebe	Podilymbus podiceps	Foithíoch gob-alabhreac	A R
Red-necked grebe	Podiceps grisegena	Foitheach píbrua	A
Great crested grebe	Podiceps cristatus	Foitheach mór / Lúnadán mór an chorraicín	A
Slavonian grebe	Podiceps auritus	Beann-foitheach	A
Black-necked grebe	Podiceps nigricollis	Foithíoch cluasach	A

== Stone-curlews, thick-knees ==
Order: Charadriiformes Family: Burhinidae

The stone-curlews or thick-knees are a group of waders found worldwide within the tropical zone, with some species also breeding in temperate Europe and Australia. They are medium to large waders with strong black or yellow-black bills, large yellow eyes, and cryptic plumage. Despite being classed as waders, most species have a preference for arid or semi-arid habitats.

Common name	Binomial	Irish name	Status
Eurasian stone-curlew	Burhinus oedicnemus	Glúinramhrach caoirliun	A R

== Oystercatchers ==
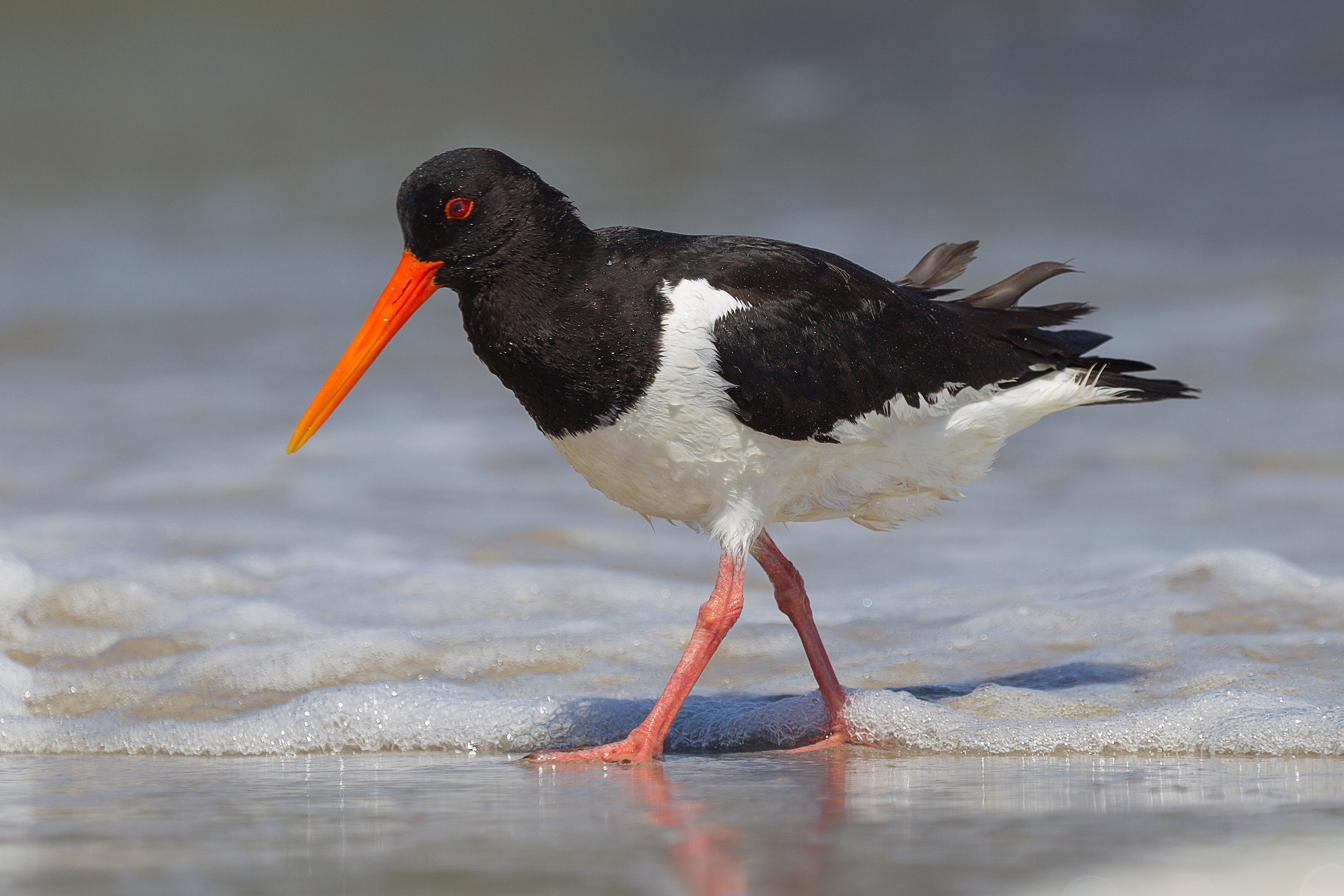
Eurasian oystercatcher, common around the coast.

Order: Charadriiformes Family: Haematopodidae

The oystercatchers are large and noisy plover-like birds, with strong bills used for smashing or prising open molluscs.

Common name	Binomial	Irish name	Status
Eurasian oystercatcher	Haematopus ostralegus	Roilleach / riabhán / scaladóir	A

== Stilts, avocets ==
Order: Charadriiformes Family: Recurvirostridae

Recurvirostridae is a family of large wading birds which includes the avocets and stilts. The avocets have long legs and long up-curved bills. The stilts have extremely long legs and long, thin, straight bills.

Common name	Binomial	Irish name	Status
Black-winged stilt	Himantopus himantopus	Scodlach dubheiteach	A
Pied avocet	Recurvirostra avosetta	Abhóiséad breac	A

== Plovers ==
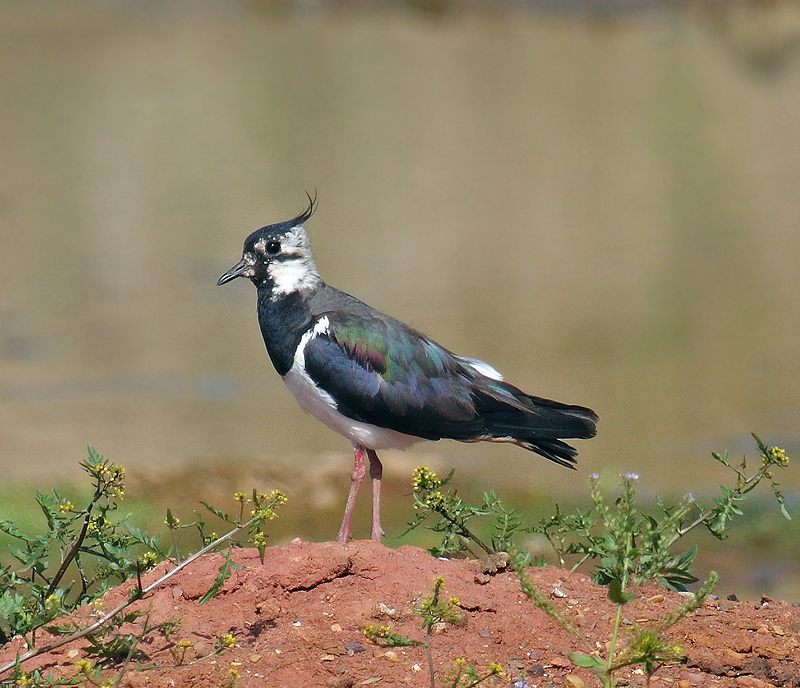
Northern lapwing, common in winter but less so in summer.

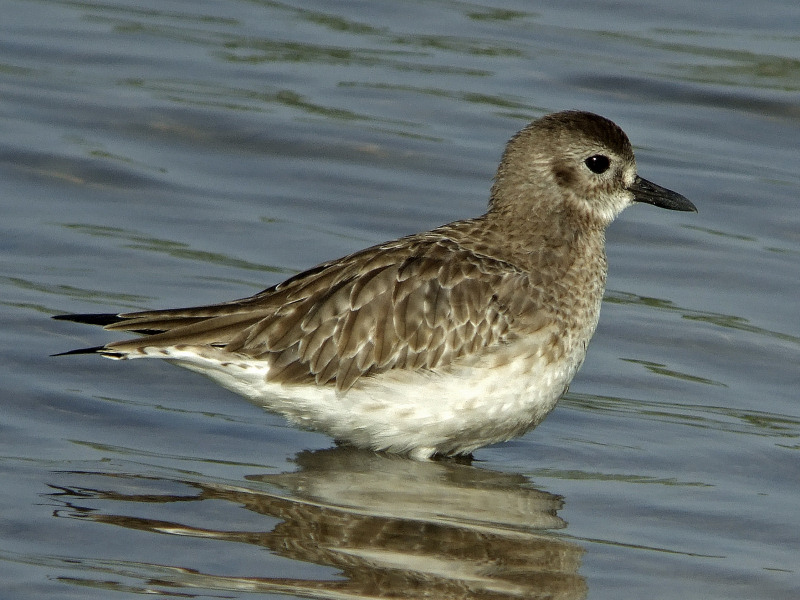
Grey plovers breed in Arctic regions.

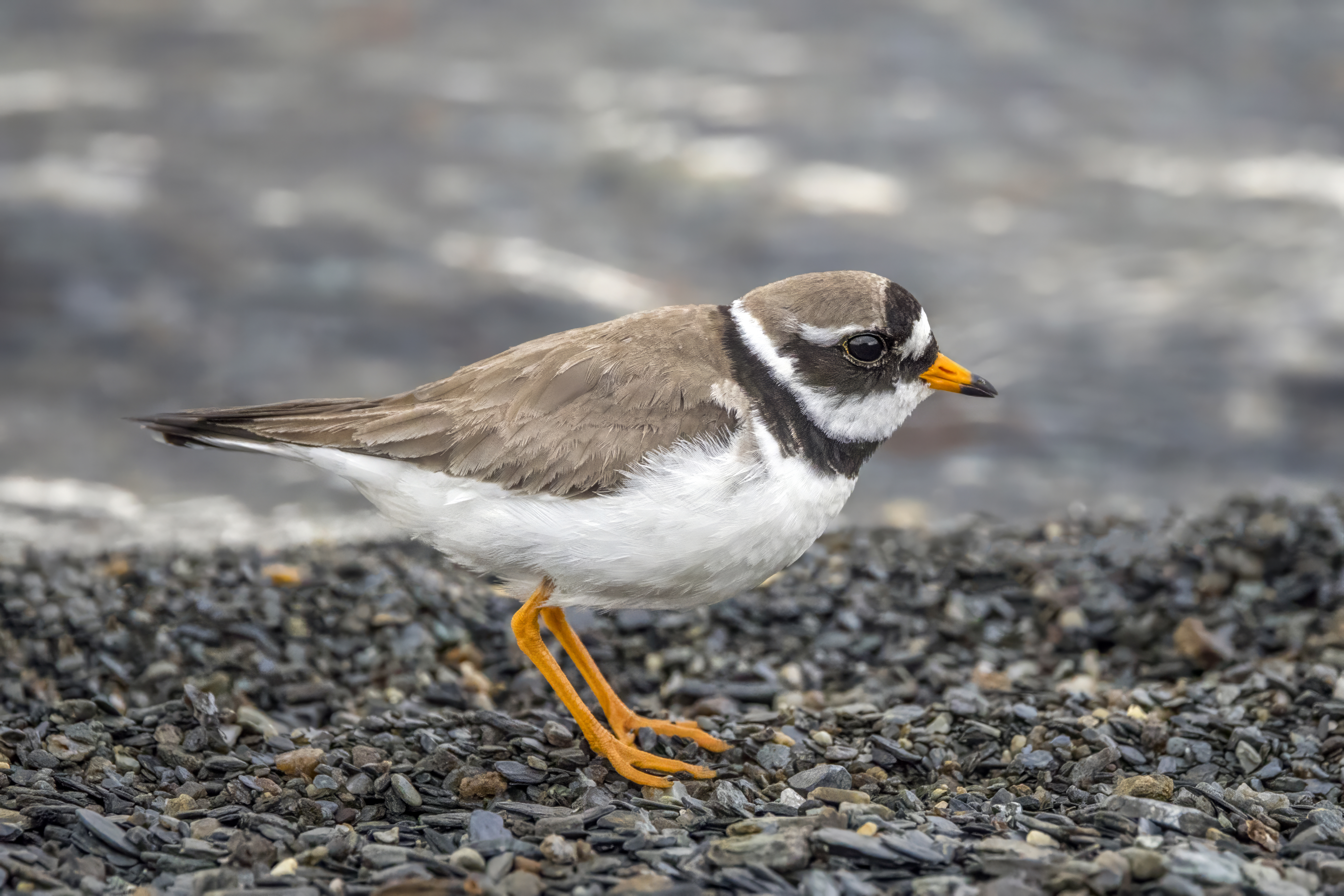
Common ringed plover, winters in coastal areas south to Africa.

Order: Charadriiformes Family: Charadriidae

The family Charadriidae includes the plovers, dotterels, and lapwings. They are small to medium-sized birds with compact bodies, short thick necks, and long, usually pointed, wings. They are found in open country worldwide, mostly in habitats near water.

Common name	Binomial	Irish name	Status
Northern lapwing	Vanellus vanellus	Saotharcán Tuaisceartach	A
Sociable lapwing	Vanellus gregarius	Saotharcóg / pilibín	A R
European golden plover	Pluvialis apricaria	Feadóg bhuí / fideog	A
American golden plover	Pluvialis dominica	Feadó bhuí mhericeánach	A
Pacific golden plover	Pluvialis fulva	Feadóg bhuí Áiseach	A R
Grey plover	Pluvialis squatarola	Feadóg bolgdubh	A
Common ringed plover	Charadrius hiaticula	Feadóg chladaigh / feadóg an fháinne / ladhrán	A
Semipalmated plover	Charadrius semipalmatus	Gobadáinín mionbhosach	A R
Little ringed plover	Charadrius dubius	Feadóg an fháinne beag	A
Killdeer	Charadrius vociferus	Feadóg ghlórach	A R
Kentish plover	Charadrius alexandrinus	Feadóigín chosdubh	A R
Lesser sand plover	Charadrius mongolus	Feadóg mhara beag	A R
Greater sand plover	Charadrius leschenaultii	Feadóg mhara mhór	A R
Eurasian dotterel	Charadrius morinellus	Amadán móinteach	A

== Sandpipers, snipes ==
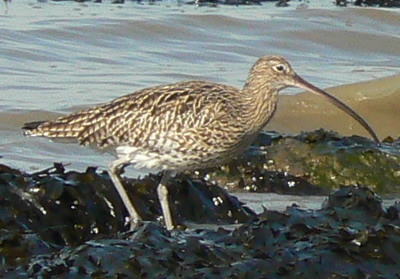
Eurasian curlew, formerly a widespread breeder, but now endangered, with only about 100 pairs left, a 98% decline since the 1980s; larger numbers in winter.

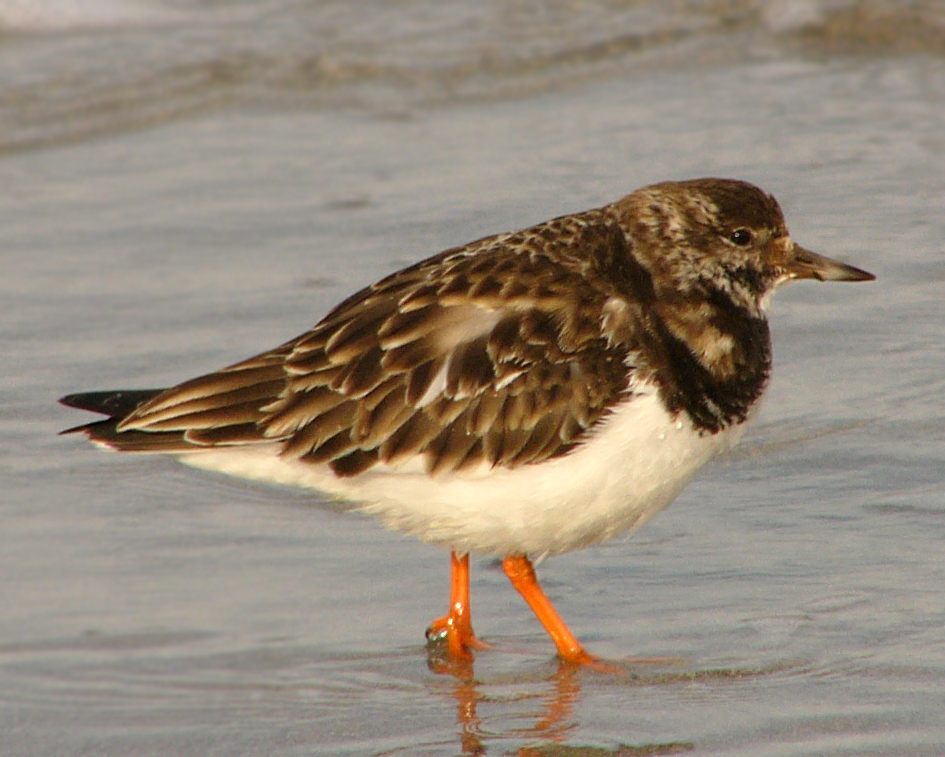
Ruddy turnstone, common on rocky coasts.

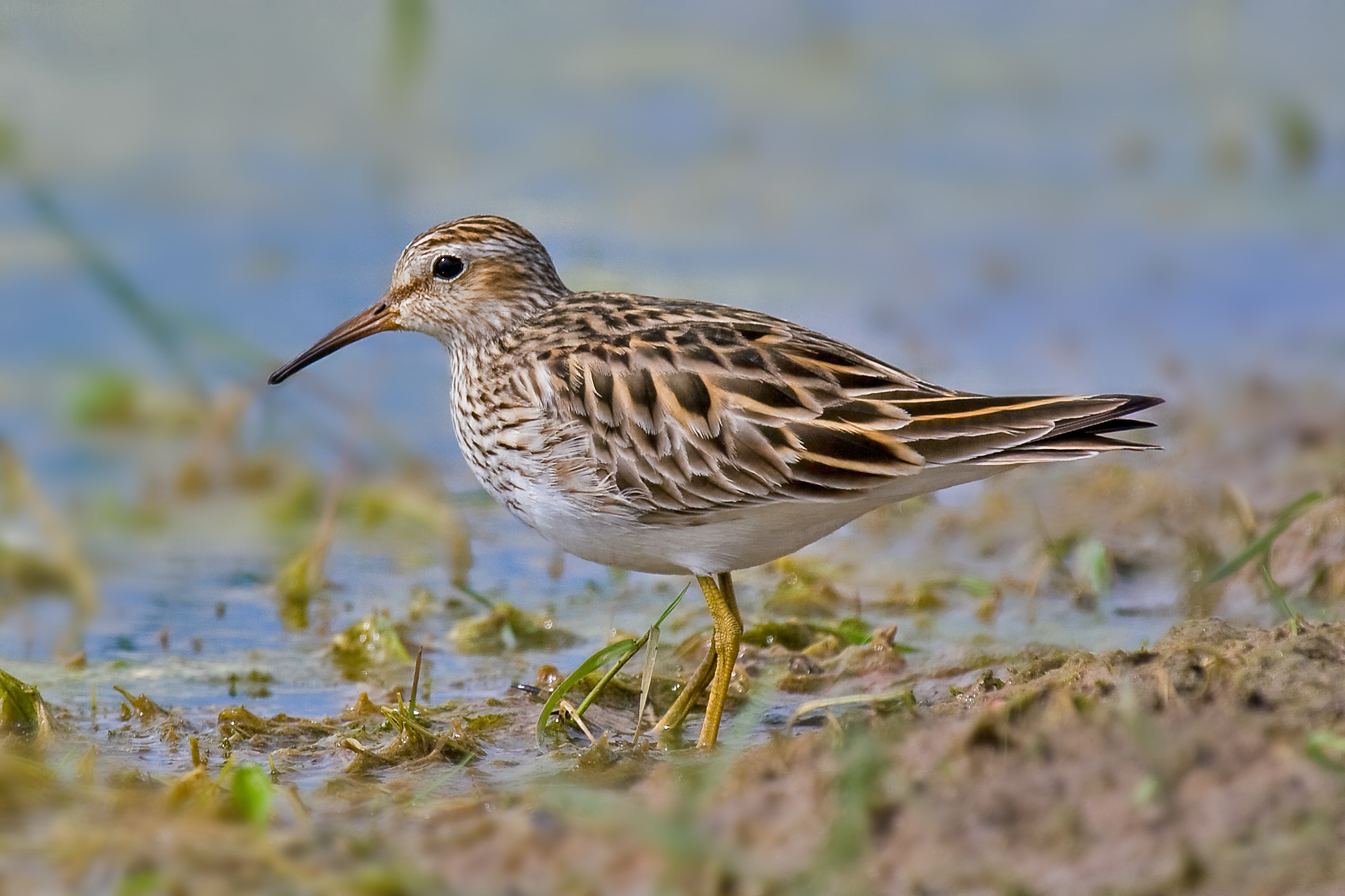
Pectoral sandpiper, a frequent vagrant from North America.

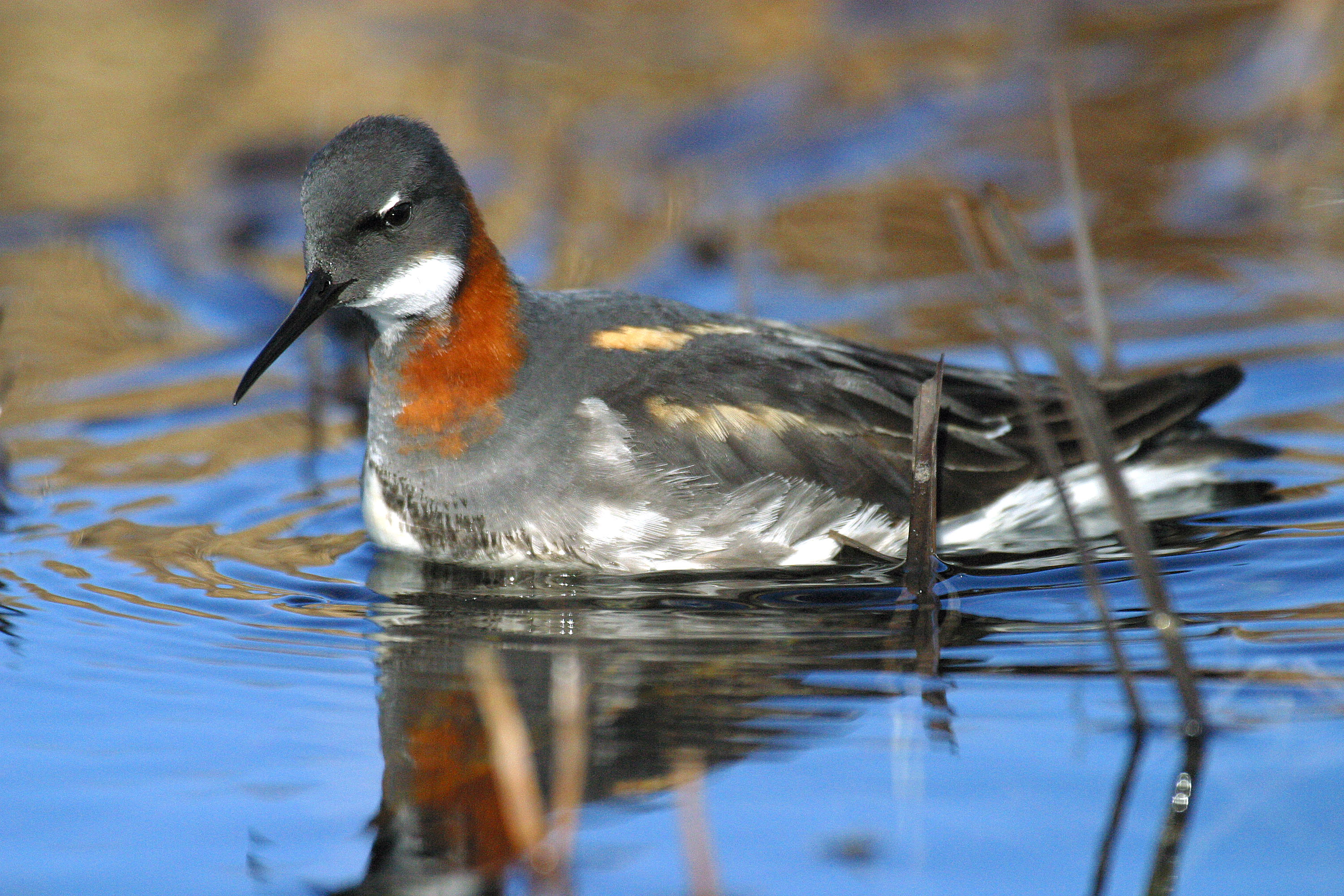
Red-necked phalarope, a former breeding species.

Order: Charadriiformes Family: Scolopacidae

Scolopacidae is a large diverse family of small to medium-sized shorebirds including the sandpipers, curlews, godwits, shanks, tattlers, woodcocks, snipes, dowitchers, and phalaropes. The majority of these species eat small invertebrates picked out of the mud or soil. Variation in length of legs and bills enables multiple species to feed in the same habitat, particularly on the coast, without direct competition for food.

Common name	Binomial	Irish name	Status
Upland sandpiper	Bartramia longicauda	Gobadán sléibhe	A R
Eurasian whimbrel	Numenius phaeopus	Crotach eanaigh	A
Eskimo curlew	Numenius borealis	Crotach Artach	B
Eurasian curlew	Numenius arquata	Crotach / cruiteach	A
Bar-tailed godwit	Limosa lapponica	Guilbneach stríocearrach	A
Black-tailed godwit	Limosa limosa	Guilbneach earrdubh	A
Hudsonian godwit	Limosa haemastica	Guilbneach brionn dearg	A R
Ruddy turnstone	Arenaria interpres	Piadálai trá ruadh	A
Great knot	Calidris tenuirostris	Cnota mór	A R
Red knot	Calidris canutus	Cnota rua	A
Ruff	Calidris pugnax	Rufachán	A
Broad-billed sandpiper	Calidris falcinellus	Gobadán gobleathan	A R
Sharp-tailed sandpiper	Calidris acuminata	Gobadán earr-rinneach	A R
Stilt sandpiper	Calidris himantopus	Gobadán scodlach	A R
Curlew sandpiper	Calidris ferruginea	Gobadán crotaigh	A
Temminck's stint	Calidris temminckii	Gobadáinín tomaltaig	A
Long-toed stint	Calidris subminuta	Gobadáinín ladharfhada	A R
Red-necked stint	Calidris ruficollis	Gobadán droimrua	A R
Sanderling	Calidris alba	Luathrán	A
Dunlin	Calidris alpina	Breacó	A
Purple sandpiper	Calidris maritima	Gobadan cosbhuí	A
Baird's sandpiper	Calidris bairdii	Gobadán bárd	A R
Little stint	Calidris minuta	Gobadáinín beag	A
Least sandpiper	Calidris minutilla	Gobadáinín bídeach	A R
White-rumped sandpiper	Calidris fuscicollis	Gobadán bánphrompach / gobadán tónbháin	A
Buff-breasted sandpiper	Calidris subruficollis	Gobadán broinn-donnbhuí	A
Pectoral sandpiper	Calidris melanotos	Gobadán uchtach	A
Semipalmated sandpiper	Calidris pusilla	Gobadán mionbhosach	A
Western sandpiper	Calidris mauri	Gobadán iartharach	A R
Long-billed dowitcher	Limnodromus scolopaceus	Guilbnín gobfhada	A
Short-billed dowitcher	Limnodromus griseus	Guilbnín gobghearr	A R
Eurasian woodcock	Scolopax rusticola	Creabhar	A
Jack snipe	Lymnocryptes minimus	Naoscach bhídeach	A
Great snipe	Gallinago media	Naoscach mór	A R
Common snipe	Gallinago gallinago	Naoscach	A
Wilson's snipe	Gallinago delicata	Naoscach macliam	A R
Terek sandpiper	Xenus cinereus	Bodairlín lusrachán	A R
Wilson's phalarope	Phalaropus tricolor	Falaróp macliam	A R
Red-necked phalarope	Phalaropus lobatus	Falaróp gobchaol	A
Grey phalarope	Phalaropus fulicarius	Falaróp rua	A
Common sandpiper	Actitis hypoleucos	Gobadán coiteann	A
Spotted sandpiper	Actitis macularia	Gobadán breac	A R
Green sandpiper	Tringa ochropus	Gobadán glas	A
Solitary sandpiper	Tringa solitaria	Gobadán aonarach	A R
Lesser yellowlegs	Tringa flavipes	Mionladhrán buí	A
Common redshank	Tringa totanus	Cosdeargán	A
Marsh sandpiper	Tringa stagnatilis	Gobadán corraigh	A R
Wood sandpiper	Tringa glareola	Gobadán coille	A
Spotted redshank	Tringa erythropus	Cosdeargán breac	A
Common greenshank	Tringa nebularia	Ladhrán glas	A
Greater yellowlegs	Tringa melanoleuca	Ladhrán buí	A R

== Coursers, pratincoles ==
Order: Charadriiformes Family: Glareolidae

Glareolidae is a family of wading birds comprising the pratincoles, which have short legs, long pointed wings, and long forked tails, and the coursers, which have long legs, short wings, and long, pointed bills which curve downwards.

Common name	Binomial	Irish name	Status
Cream-coloured courser	Cursorius cursor	Rásaí bánbhuí	A R
Collared pratincole	Glareola pratincola	Pratancól muinceach	A R
Black-winged pratincole	Glareola nordmanni	Pratancól dubheiteach	A R

== Gulls, terns, skimmers ==
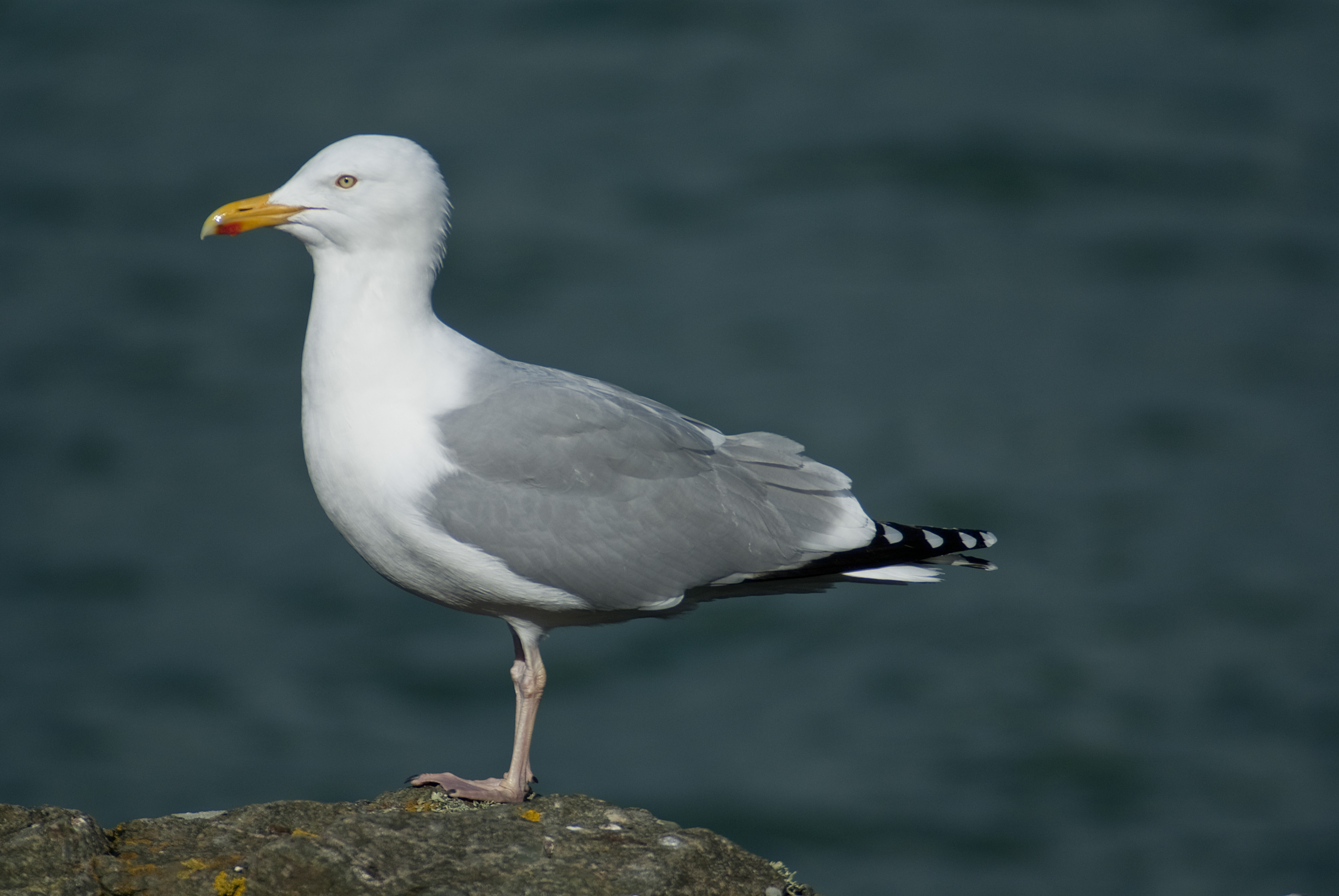
Herring gull, very common resident.

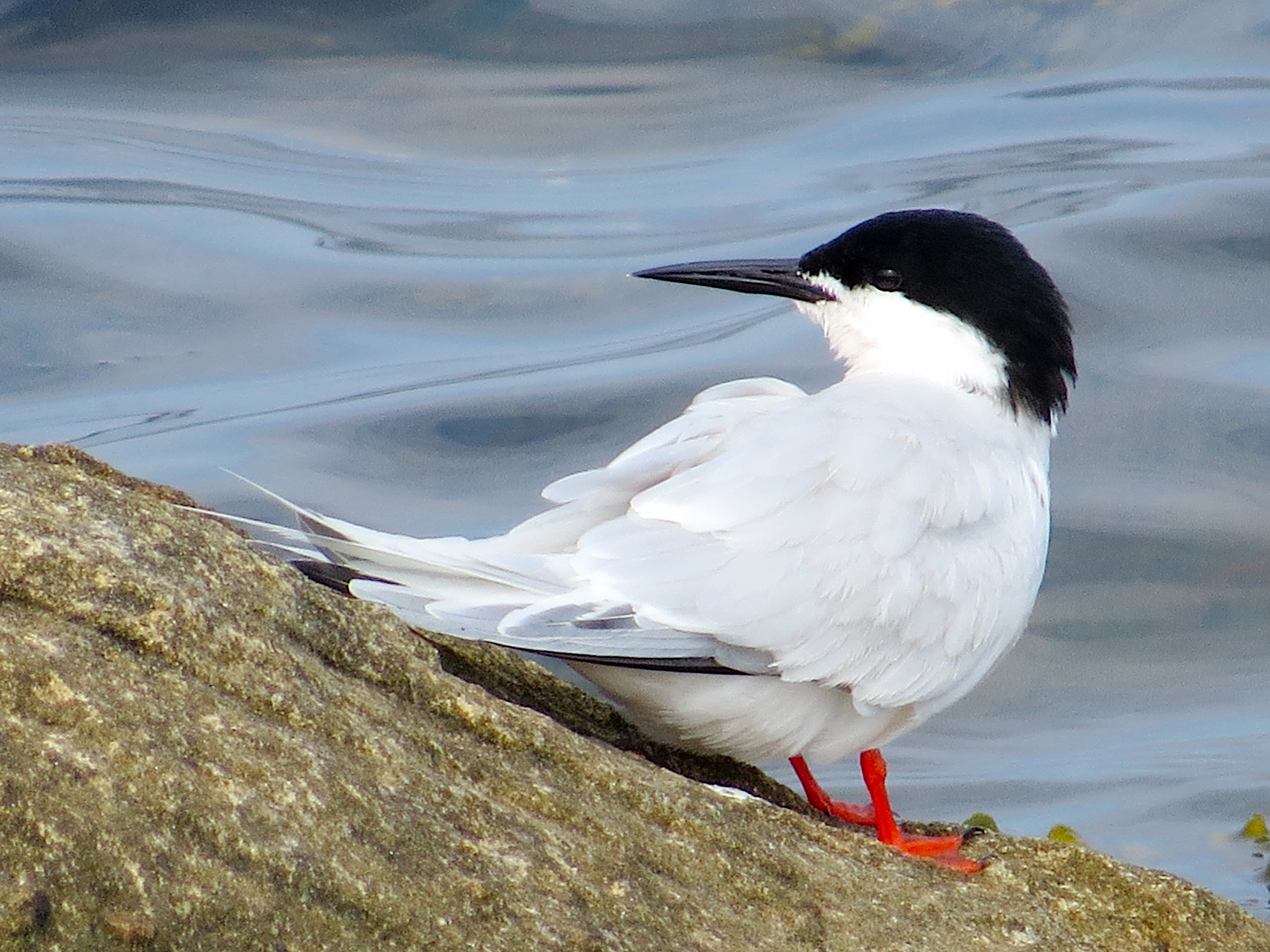
Roseate tern, a scarce summer visitor. Ireland holds the largest population in Europe.

Order: Charadriiformes Family: Laridae

Laridae is a family of medium to large seabirds, the gulls, terns, and skimmers. Gulls are typically grey or white, often with black markings on the head or wings. They have stout, longish bills and webbed feet. Terns are a group of generally medium to large seabirds typically with grey or white plumage, often with black markings on the head. Most terns hunt fish by diving but some pick insects off the surface of fresh water. Terns are generally long-lived birds, with several species known to live in excess of 30 years.

Common name	Binomial	Irish name	Status
Black-legged kittiwake	Rissa tridactyla	Saidhbhéar	A
Ivory gull	Pagophila eburnea	Faoileán eabhartha	A R
Sabine's gull	Xema sabini	Sléibhín Sabine	A
Bonaparte's gull	Chroicocephalus philadelphia	Sléibhín Bonaparte	A
Black-headed gull	Chroicocephalus ridibundus	Sléibhín	A
Little gull	Hydrocoloeus minutus	Sléibhín beag	A
Ross's gull	Rhodostethia rosea	Faoileán Ross	A R
Laughing gull	Leucophaeus atricilla	Sléibhín an gháire	A R
Franklin's gull	Leucophaeus pipixcan	Sléibhín Franklin	A R
Mediterranean gull	Ichthyaetus melanocephalus	Sléibhín meánmhuirí	A
Common gull	Larus canus	Faoileán bán	A
Ring-billed gull	Larus delawarensis	Faoileán bandghobach	A
Great black-backed gull	Larus marinus	Droimneach mór	A
Glaucous-winged gull	Larus glaucescens	Faoileán glas	A R
Glaucous gull	Larus hyperboreus	Faoileán glas	A
Iceland gull	Larus glaucoides	Faoileán Íoslannach	A
European herring gull	Larus argentatus	Faoileán scadán	A
American herring gull	Larus smithsonianus		A
Vega gull	Larus vegae		A R
Caspian gull	Larus cachinnans	Faoileán gáiriteach	A R
Yellow-legged gull	Larus michahellis	Faoileán scadán cosbhuí	A
Slaty-backed gull	Larus schistisagus		A R
Lesser black-backed gull	Larus fuscus	Droimneach beag	A
Gull-billed tern	Gelochelidon nilotica	Geabhróg ghobdhubh	A R
Caspian tern	Hydroprogne caspia	Geabhróg Chaispeach	A R
Royal tern	Thalasseus maximus	Geabhróg ríoga	A R
Lesser crested tern	Thalasseus bengalensis	Miongheabhróg chíorach	A R
West African crested tern	Thalasseus albididorsalis		A R
Sandwich tern	Thalasseus sandvicensis	Geabhróg scothdhubh	A
Elegant tern	Thalasseus elegans	Geabhróg ghalánta	A R
Little tern	Sternula albifrons	Geabhróg bheag	A
Sooty tern	Onychoprion fuscatus	Geabhróg shúicheach	A R
Roseate tern	Sterna dougallii	Geabhróg rosach	A
Common tern	Sterna hirundo	Geabhróg	A
Arctic tern	Sterna paradisaea	Geabhróg Artach	A
Forster's tern	Sterna forsteri	Geabhróg Forster	A R
Whiskered tern	Chlidonias hybridus	Geabhróg bhroinndubh	A R
White-winged tern	Chlidonias leucopterus	Geabhróg bháneiteach	A R
Black tern	Chlidonias niger	Geabhróg dhubh	A

== Skuas ==
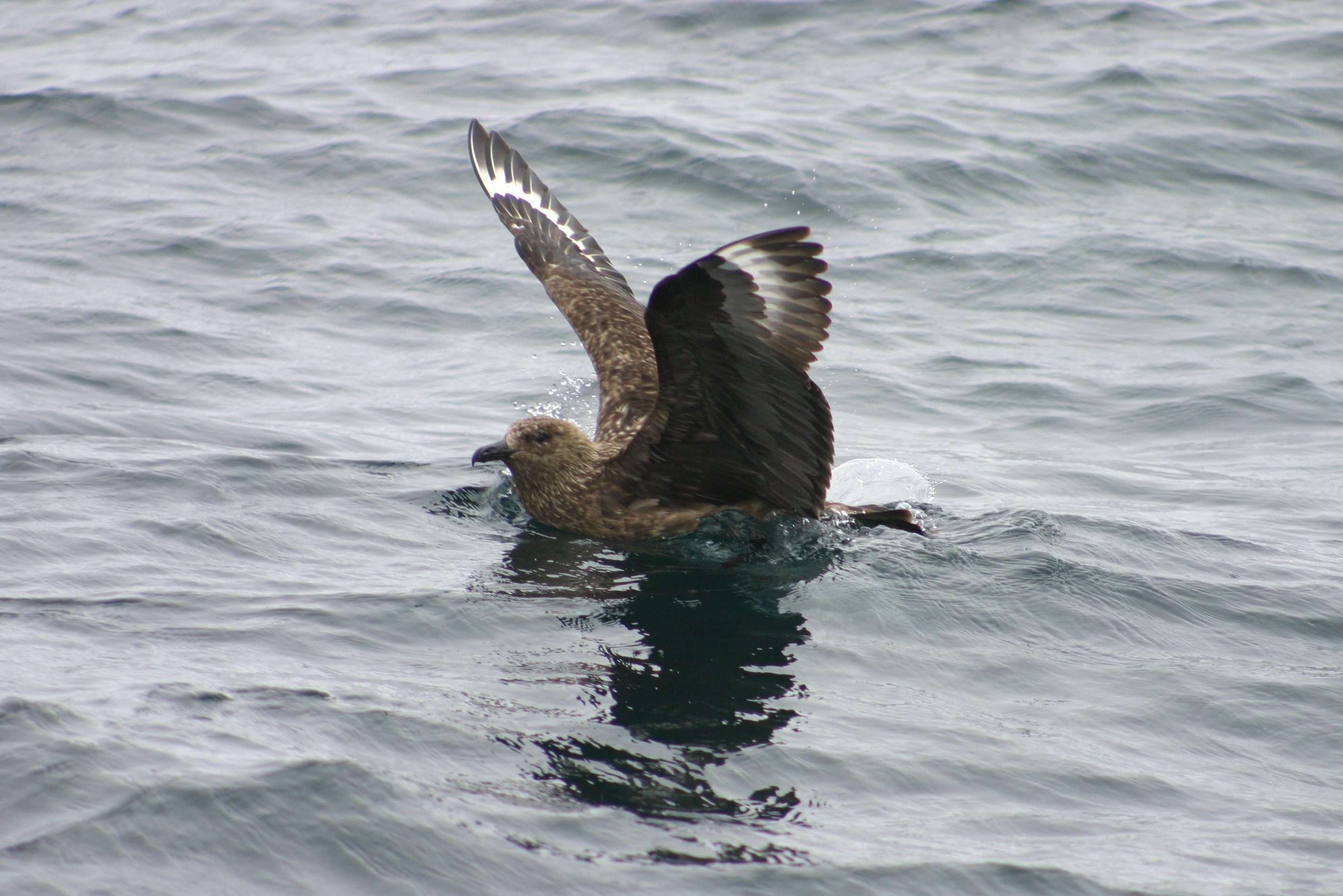
Great skua, a passage migrant around the coast.

Order: Charadriiformes Family: Stercorariidae

The family Stercorariidae are, in general, medium to large birds, typically with grey or brown plumage, often with white markings on the wings. They nest on the ground in temperate and arctic regions and are long-distance migrants.

Common name	Binomial	Irish name	Status
Great skua	Stercorarius skua	Meirleach mór	A
Pomarine skua	Stercorarius pomarinus	Meirleach pomairíneach	A
Arctic skua	Stercorarius parasiticus	Meirleach Artach	A
Long-tailed skua	Stercorarius longicaudus	Meirleach earrfhada	A

== Auks ==
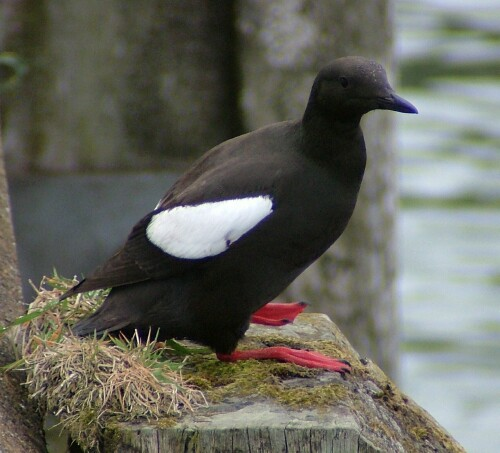
Black guillemot, found along rocky coasts and around harbours and piers.

Order: Charadriiformes Family: Alcidae

Alcids are superficially similar to penguins due to their black-and-white colours, their upright posture, and some of their habits. However, they are not related to the penguins and differ in being able to fly. Auks live on the open sea, only deliberately coming ashore to nest.

Common name	Binomial	Irish name	Status
Little auk	Alle alle	Foracha bheag	A
Brünnich's guillemot	Uria lomvia	Foracha brünnich	A R
Common guillemot	Uria aalge	Foracha	A
Razorbill	Alca torda	Crosán	A
Great auk	Pinguinus impennis	Foracha mhór	B (extinct)
Black guillemot	Cepphus grylle	Foracha dhubh	A
Atlantic puffin	Fratercula arctica	Puifín	A

== Divers ==
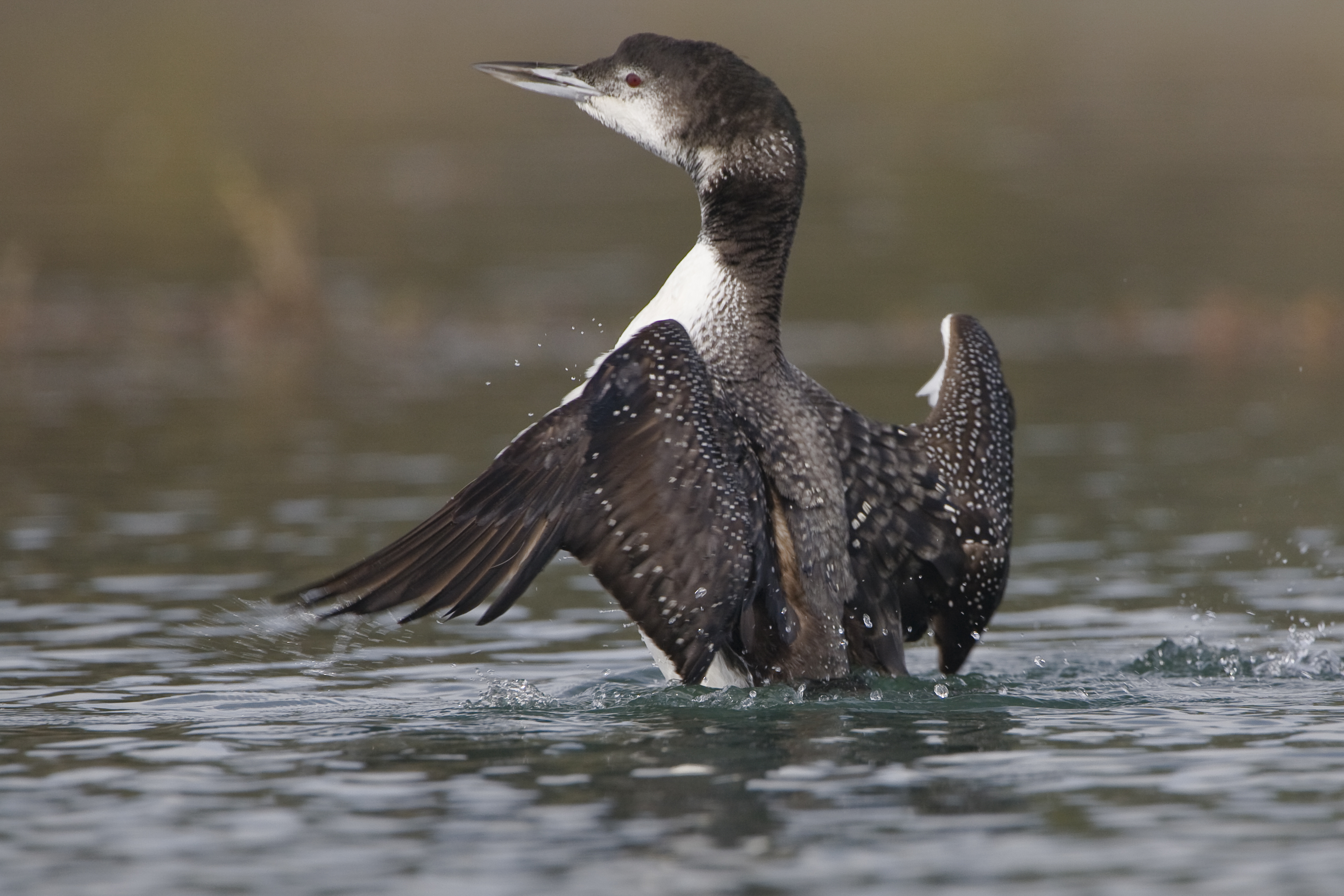
Great northern diver, a winter visitor to coastal waters.

Order: Gaviiformes Family: Gaviidae

Divers, also known as loons in North America, are a group of aquatic birds found in many parts of North America and northern Eurasia. They are the size of a large duck or small goose, which they somewhat resemble in shape when swimming, but to which they are completely unrelated.

Common name	Binomial	Irish name	Status
Red-throated diver	Gavia stellata	Lóma rua	A
Black-throated diver	Gavia arctica	Lóma Artach	A
Pacific diver	Gavia pacifica		A R
Great northern diver	Gavia immer	Lóma mór	A
White-billed diver	Gavia adamsii	Lóma gobgheal	A R

== Austral storm petrels ==
Order: Procellariiformes Family: Oceanitidae

The storm petrels are the smallest seabirds, relatives of the petrels, feeding on planktonic crustaceans and small fish picked from the surface, typically while hovering. The flight is fluttering and sometimes bat-like. Until 2018, this family's species were included with the other storm petrels in family Hydrobatidae.

Common name	Binomial	Irish name	Status
Wilson's storm petrel	Oceanites oceanicus	Guairdeall Wilson	A

== Albatrosses ==
Order: Procellariiformes Family: Diomedeidae

The albatrosses are among the largest of flying birds, and the great albatrosses from the genus Diomedea have the largest wingspans of any extant birds.

Common name	Binomial	Irish name	Status
Black-browed albatross	Thalassarche melanophris	Albatras dú-mhalach	A R

== Northern storm petrels ==
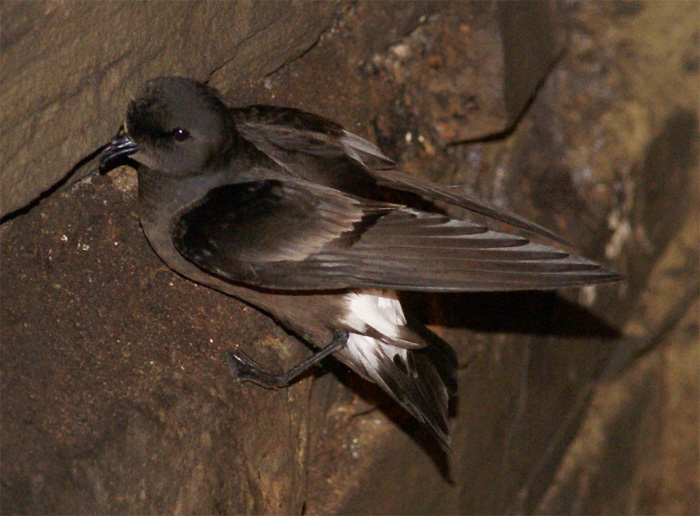
European storm petrel; Ireland has the world's largest breeding population.

Order: Procellariiformes Family: Hydrobatidae

Though the members of this family are similar in many respects to the southern storm petrels, including their general appearance and habits, there are enough genetic differences to warrant their placement in a separate family.

Common name	Binomial	Irish name	Status
European storm petrel	Hydrobates pelagicus	Guairdeall	A
Band-rumped storm petrel / Monteiro's storm petrel / Cape Verde storm petrel	Hydrobates castro / Hydrobates monteiroi / Hydrobates jabejabe		B R (see note) (Note: "Following the split of Madeiran Storm petrel as three species, the Irish record at Blackrock Lighthouse, Mayo in October 1931, is currently under review by the IRBC.")
Swinhoe's storm petrel	Hydrobates monorhis		A R
Leach's storm petrel	Hydrobates leucorhous	Guairdeall gabhlach	A

== Petrels, shearwaters, diving petrels ==
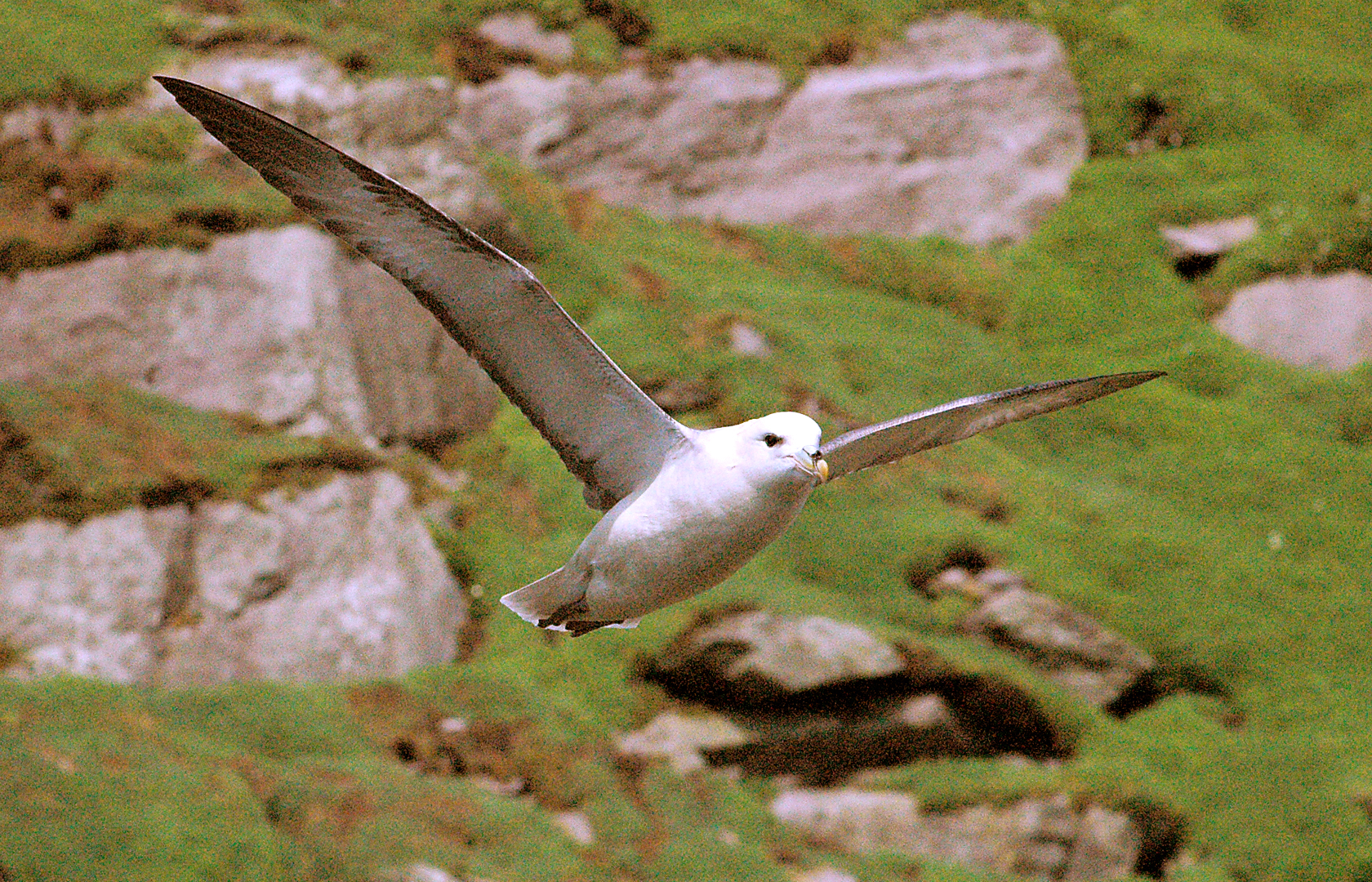
Northern fulmars first bred in 1911 but are now widespread.

Order: Procellariiformes Family: Procellariidae

The procellariids are the main group of medium-sized petrels and shearwaters, characterised by united nostrils with medium septum and a long outer functional primary.

Common name	Binomial	Irish name	Status
Southern giant petrel	Macronectes giganteus		A R
Northern fulmar	Fulmarus glacialis	Fulmaire	A
Zino's petrel	Pterodroma madeira		A R
Fea's petrel	Pterodroma feae		A R
Bermuda petrel	Pterodroma cahow		A R
White-chinned petrel	Procellaria aequinoctialis		A
Scopoli's shearwater	Calonectris diomedea		A R
Cory's shearwater	Calonectris borealis	Cánóg Cory	A
Sooty shearwater	Ardenna griseus	Cánóg dhorcha	A
Short-tailed shearwater	Ardenna tenuirostris		A
Great shearwater	Ardenna gravis	Cánóg mhór	A
Manx shearwater	Puffinus puffinus	Cánóg dhubh	A
Yelkouan shearwater	Puffinus yelkouan		A R
Balearic shearwater	Puffinus mauretanicus		A
Barolo shearwater	Puffinus baroli	Cánóg Barolo	A R
Bulwer's petrel	Bulweria bulwerii	Peadairín Bulwer	A R

== Storks ==
Order: Ciconiiformes Family: Ciconiidae

Storks are large, long-legged, long-necked, wading birds with long, stout bills. Storks are mute, but bill-clattering is an important mode of communication at the nest. Their nests can be large and may be reused for many years. Many species are migratory.

Common name	Binomial	Irish name	Status
Black stork	Ciconia nigra	Storc dubh	A R
White stork	Ciconia ciconia	Storc bán	A

== Frigatebirds ==
Order: Suliformes Family: Fregatidae

Frigatebirds are large seabirds usually found over tropical oceans. They are large, black-and-white, or completely black, with long wings and deeply forked tails. The males have coloured inflatable throat pouches. They do not swim or walk and cannot take off from a flat surface. Having the largest wingspan-to-body-weight ratio of any bird, they are essentially aerial, able to stay aloft for more than a week.

Common name	Binomial	Irish name	Status
Frigatebird species	Fregata sp.	Speiceas frigéid	A R

== Gannets, boobies ==
Order: Suliformes Family: Sulidae

The sulids comprise the gannets and boobies. Both groups are medium to large coastal seabirds that plunge-dive for fish.

Common name	Binomial	Irish name	Status
Northern gannet	Morus bassanus	Gainead	A
Brown booby	Sula leucogaster		A R

== Cormorants, shags ==
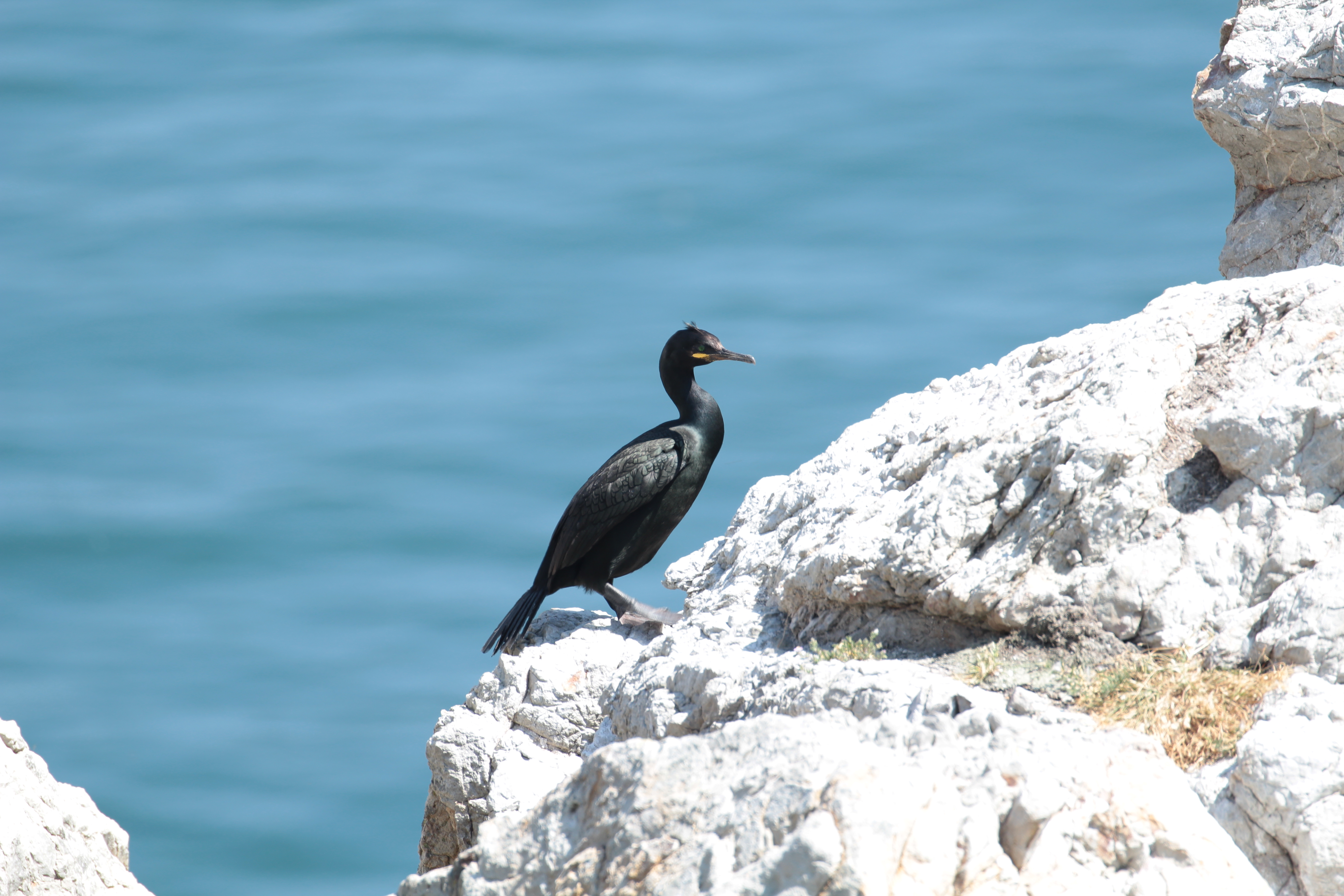
European shags, common around the coast.

Order: Suliformes Family: Phalacrocoracidae

Phalacrocoracidae is a family of medium to large coastal, fish-eating seabirds that includes cormorants and shags. Plumage colouration varies, with the majority having mainly dark plumage, some species being black-and-white and a few being colourful.

Common name	Binomial	Irish name	Status
Great cormorant	Phalacrocorax carbo	Broigheall	A
European shag	Gulosus aristotelis	Seaga	A
Double-crested cormorant	Nannopterum auritum	Broigheall cluasach	A R

== Ibises and spoonbills ==
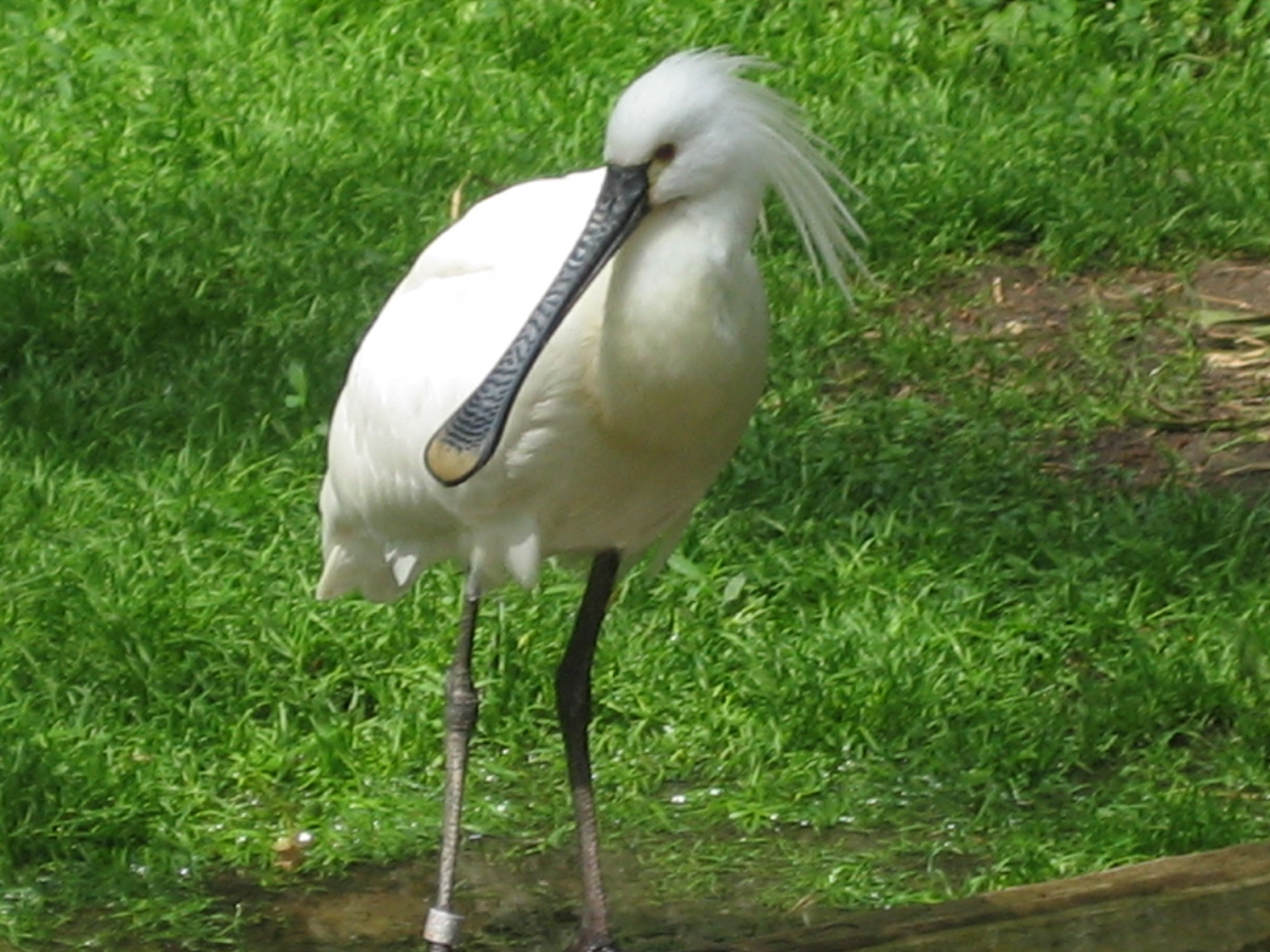
Eurasian spoonbill, a rare visitor.

Order: Pelecaniformes Family: Threskiornithidae

Threskiornithidae is a family of large terrestrial and wading birds which includes the ibises and spoonbills. They have long, broad wings with 11 primary and about 20 secondary feathers. They are strong fliers and despite their size and weight, very capable soarers.

Common name	Binomial	Irish name	Status
Glossy ibis	Plegadis falcinellus	Íbis niamhrach	A
Eurasian spoonbill	Platalea leucorodia	Corr leitheadach Eoráiseach	A

== Herons, bitterns ==
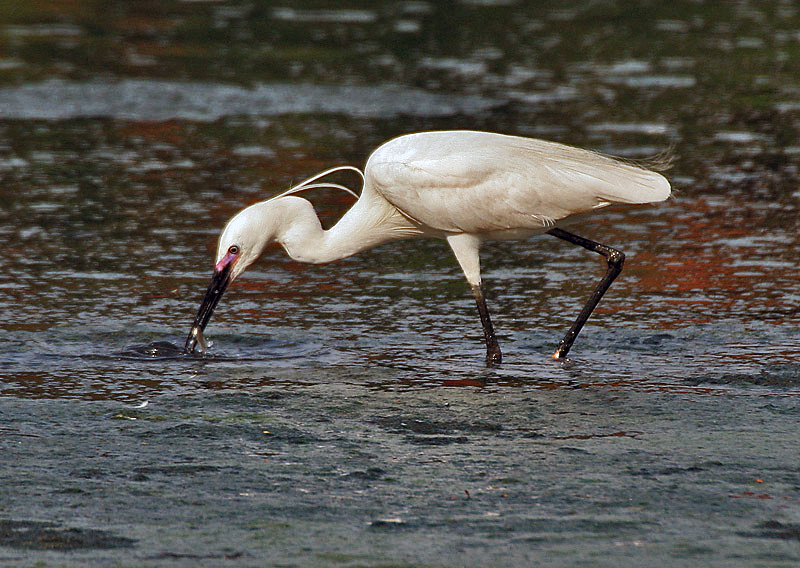
Little egret, first bred in 1997 and is increasingly common.

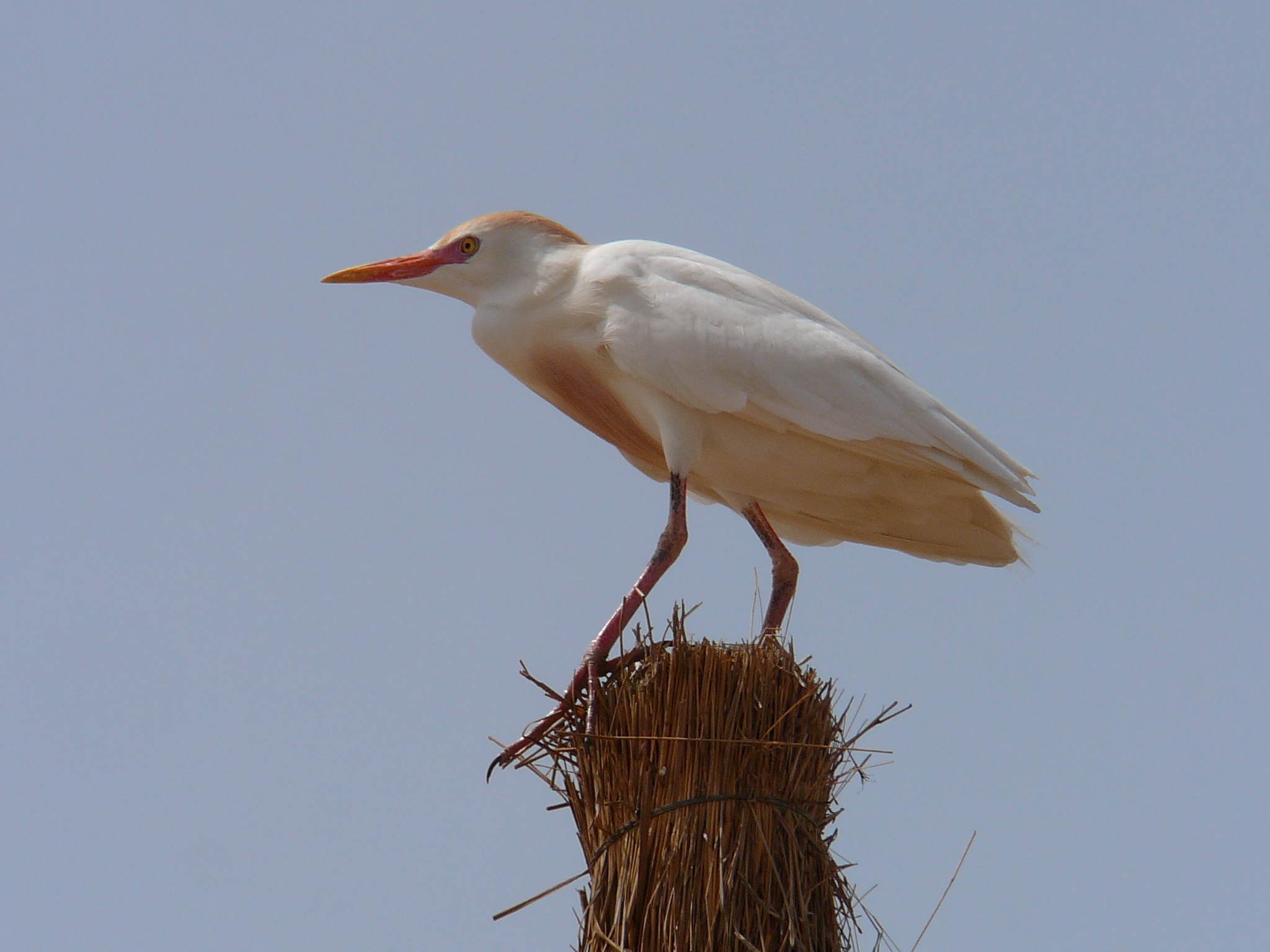
Cattle egret, a rare vagrant.

Order: Pelecaniformes Family: Ardeidae

The family Ardeidae contains the bitterns, herons, and egrets. Herons and egrets are medium to large wading birds with long necks and legs. Bitterns tend to be shorter-necked and more wary. Members of Ardeidae fly with their necks retracted, unlike other long-necked birds such as storks, ibises, and spoonbills.

Common name	Binomial	Irish name	Status
Eurasian bittern	Botaurus stellaris	Bonnán	A
American bittern	Botaurus lentiginosus	Bonnán Meiriceánach	A R
Little bittern	Ixobrychus minutus	Bonnán beag	A R
Black-crowned night heron	Nycticorax nycticorax	Corr oíche	A R
Green heron	Butorides virescens	Corr ghormghlas	A R
Squacco heron	Ardeola ralloides	Corr scréachach	A R
Western cattle egret	Bubulcus ibis	Éigrit eallaigh	A
Grey heron	Ardea cinerea	Corr réisc	A
Purple heron	Ardea purpurea	Corr chorcra	A
Great egret	Ardea alba	Éigrit mhór	A
Little blue heron	Egretta caerulea	Éigrit ghorm	A R
Little egret	Egretta garzetta	Éigrit bheag	A

== Osprey ==
Order: Accipitriformes Family: Pandionidae

The family Pandionidae contains one species, the osprey. Ospreys are medium-large raptors that are specialist fish-eaters.

Common name	Binomial	Irish name	Status
Osprey	Pandion haliaetus	Coirneach	A

== Kites, hawks, eagles ==
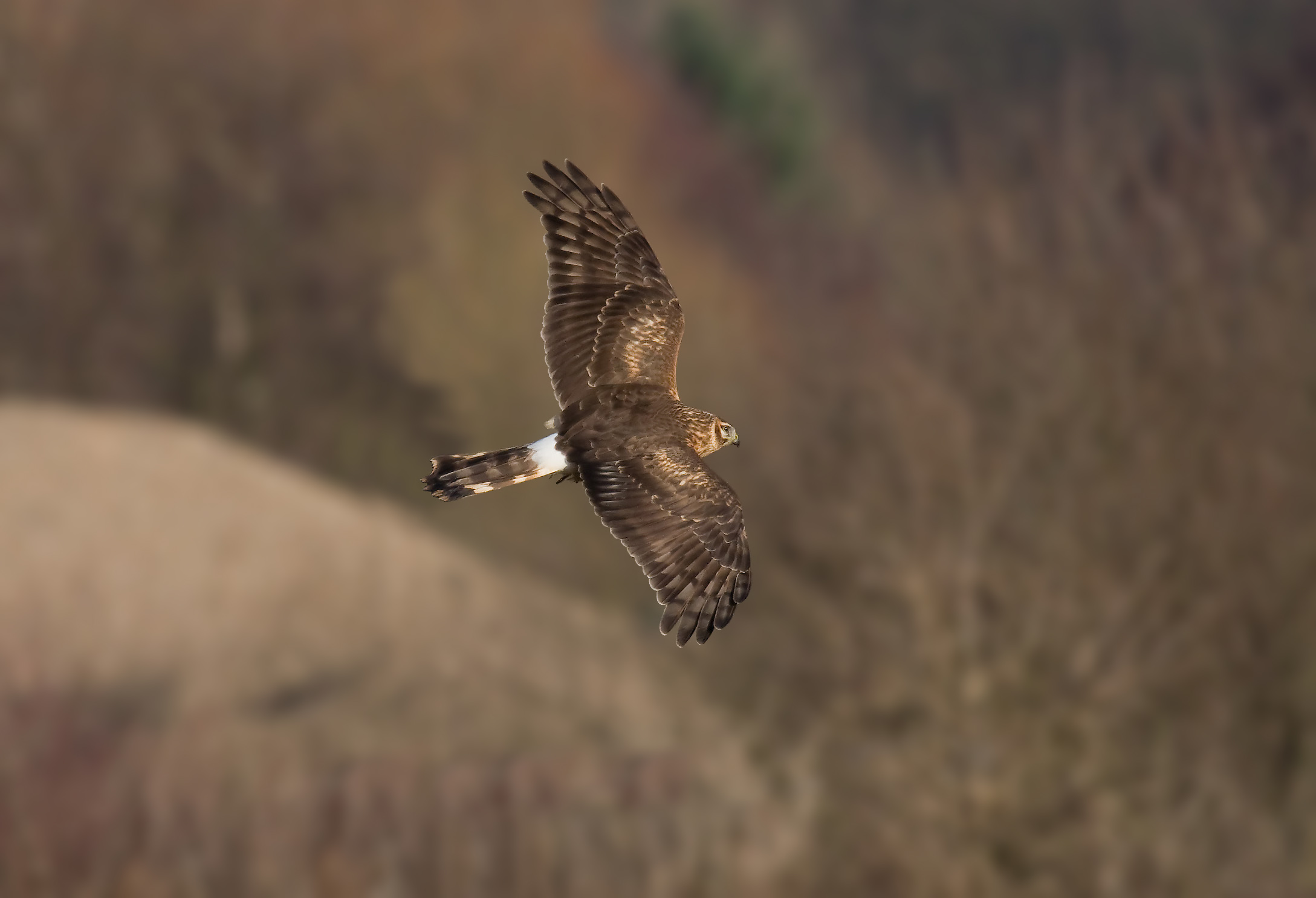
Hen harrier, a rare breeding bird.

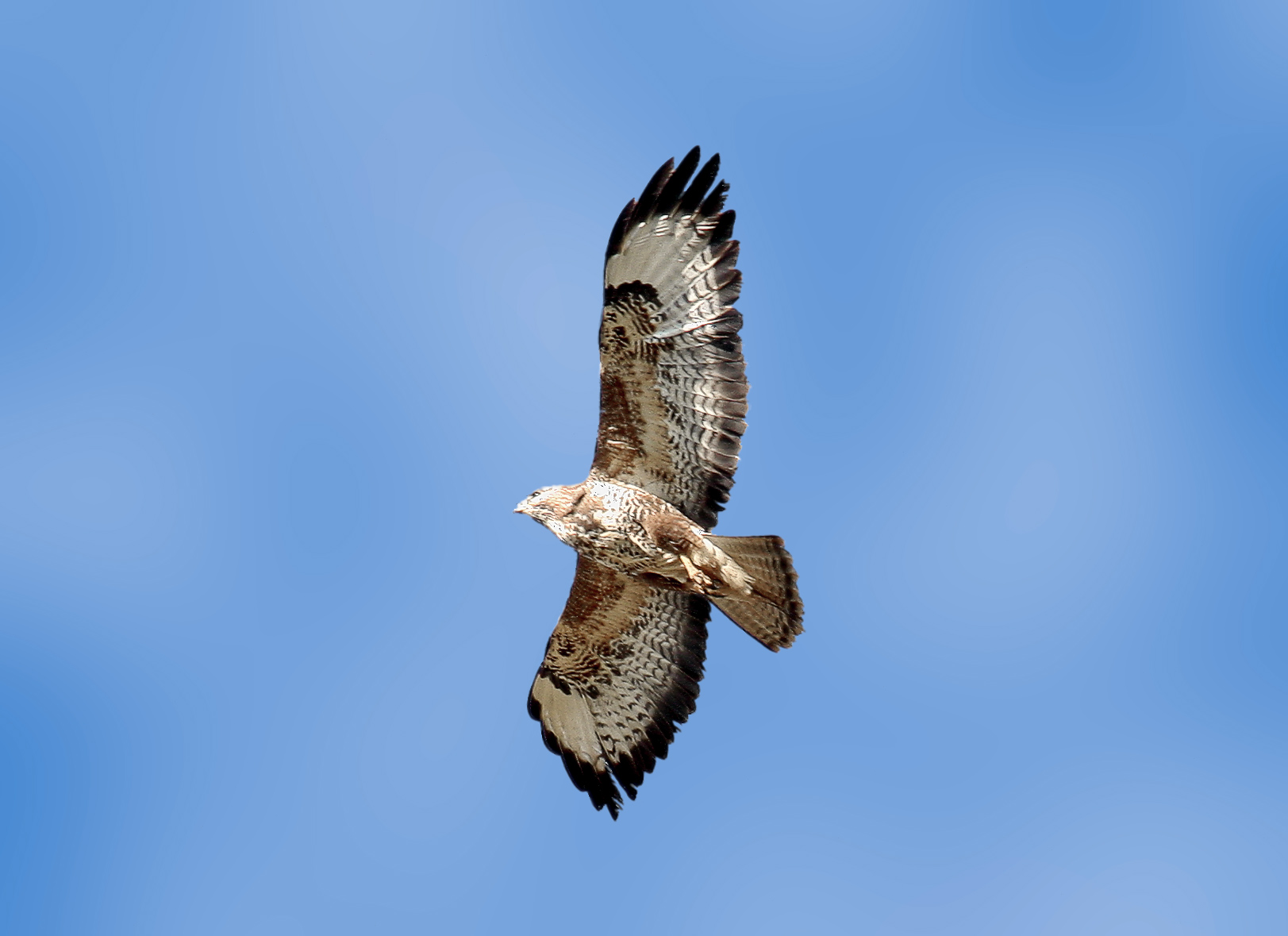
Common buzzard, increasing and spreading.

Order: Accipitriformes Family: Accipitridae

Accipitridae is a family of birds of prey which includes hawks, eagles, kites, harriers, and Old World vultures. These birds have powerful hooked beaks for tearing flesh from their prey, strong legs, powerful talons, and keen eyesight.

Common name	Binomial	Irish name	Status
European honey buzzard	Pernis apivorus	Clamhán míl	A R
Griffon vulture	Gyps fulvus	Bultúr gríofa	B R
Greater spotted eagle	Clanga clanga	Iolar breac mór	B R
Golden eagle	Aquila chrysaetos	Iolar firéan	A R
Eurasian sparrowhawk	Accipiter nisus	Spioróg	A
Eurasian goshawk	Accipiter gentilis	Spioróg mhór	A R
Western marsh harrier	Circus aeruginosus	Cromán móna	A
Hen harrier	Circus cyaneus	Cromán na gcearc	A
Northern harrier	Circus hudsonius		A R
Pallid harrier	Circus macrourus	Cromán bánlíoch	A R
Montagu's harrier	Circus pygargus	Cromán liath	A
Red kite	Milvus milvus	Cúr rua	A
Black kite	Milvus migrans	Cúr dubh	A R
White-tailed eagle	Haliaeetus albicilla	Iolar mara	A R
Bald eagle	Haliaeetus leucocephalus	Iolar mhaol	A R
Rough-legged buzzard	Buteo lagopus	Clamhán lópach	A R
Common buzzard	Buteo buteo	Clamhán	A

== Barn owls ==
Order: Strigiformes Family: Tytonidae

Barn owls are medium to large owls with large heads and characteristic heart-shaped faces. They have long strong legs with powerful talons.

Common name	Binomial	Irish name	Status
Western barn owl	Tyto alba	Scréachóg reilige	A

== Owls ==
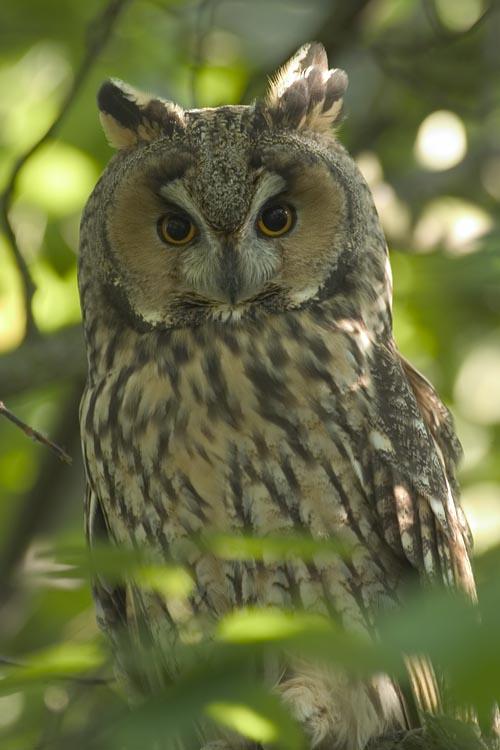
Long-eared owl, a difficult-to-see resident.

Order: Strigiformes Family: Strigidae

The typical owls are small to large solitary nocturnal birds of prey. They have large forward-facing eyes and ears, a hawk-like beak, and a conspicuous circle of feathers around each eye called a facial disk.

Common name	Binomial	Irish name	Status
Eurasian scops owl	Otus scops	Ulchabhán scopach Eoráiseach	A R
Snowy owl	Bubo scandiacus	Ulchabhán sneachtúil	A R
Little owl	Athene noctua	Ulchabhán beag	A R
Long-eared owl	Asio otus	Ceann cait	A
Short-eared owl	Asio flammeus	Ulchabhán réisc	A

== Hoopoes ==
Order: Bucerotiformes Family: Upupidae

Hoopoes have black, white, and orangey-pink colouring with a large erectile crest on their head.

Common name	Binomial	Irish name	Status
Eurasian hoopoe	Upupa epops	Húpú	A

== Rollers ==
Order: Coraciiformes Family: Coraciidae

Rollers resemble crows in size and build, but are more closely related to the kingfishers and bee-eaters. They share the colourful appearance of those groups with blues and browns predominating. The two inner front toes are connected, but the outer toe is not.

Common name	Binomial	Irish name	Status
European roller	Coracias garrulus	Rollóir Eorpach	A R

== Kingfishers ==
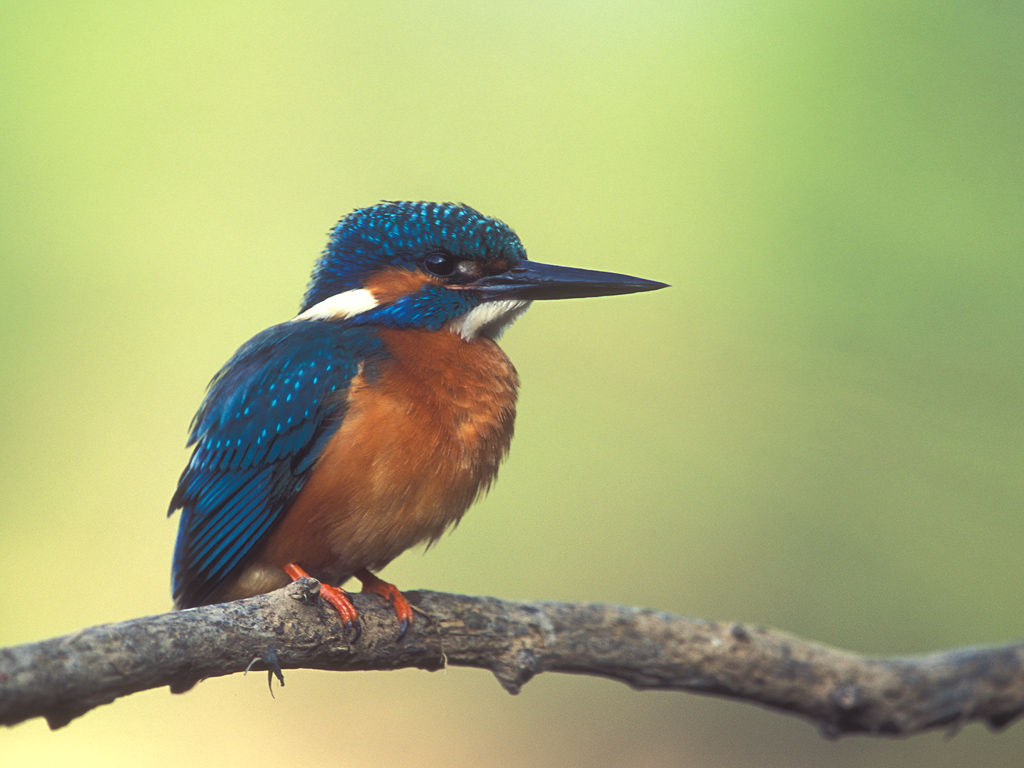
Common kingfisher, seen beside rivers and lakes.

Order: Coraciiformes Family: Alcedinidae

Kingfishers are medium-sized birds with large heads, long pointed bills, short legs, and stubby tails.

Common name	Binomial	Irish name	Status
Common kingfisher	Alcedo atthis	Cruidín	A
Belted kingfisher	Megaceryle alcyon	Cruidín creasa	A R

== Bee-eaters ==
Order: Coraciiformes Family: Meropidae

The bee-eaters are a family of coraciiform birds found mostly in Africa, but others occur in southern Europe, Madagascar, Australia, and New Guinea. They are characterised by richly coloured plumage, slender bodies, and usually elongated central tail feathers. All are colourful and have long downturned bills and pointed wings, which give them a swallow-like appearance when seen from afar.

Common name	Binomial	Irish name	Status
European bee-eater	Merops apiaster	Beachadóir Eorpach	A

== Woodpeckers ==
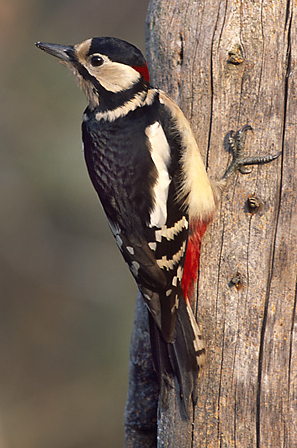
Great spotted woodpecker, an occasional visitor which has bred recently.

Order: Piciformes Family: Picidae

Woodpeckers are small to medium-sized birds with chisel-like beaks, short legs, stiff tails, and long tongues used for capturing insects. Some species have feet with two toes pointing forward and two backward, while several species have only three toes. Many woodpeckers have the habit of tapping noisily on tree trunks with their beaks. Great spotted woodpecker has started breeding in recent years.

Common name	Binomial	Irish name	Status
Eurasian wryneck	Jynx torquilla	Cam-mhuin	A
Yellow-bellied sapsucker	Sphyrapicus varius	Súdhiúlaí tarrbhuí	A R
Great spotted woodpecker	Dendrocopos major	Mórchnagaire breac	A
Eurasian green woodpecker	Picus viridis	Cnagaire glas	B R

== Caracaras, falcons ==
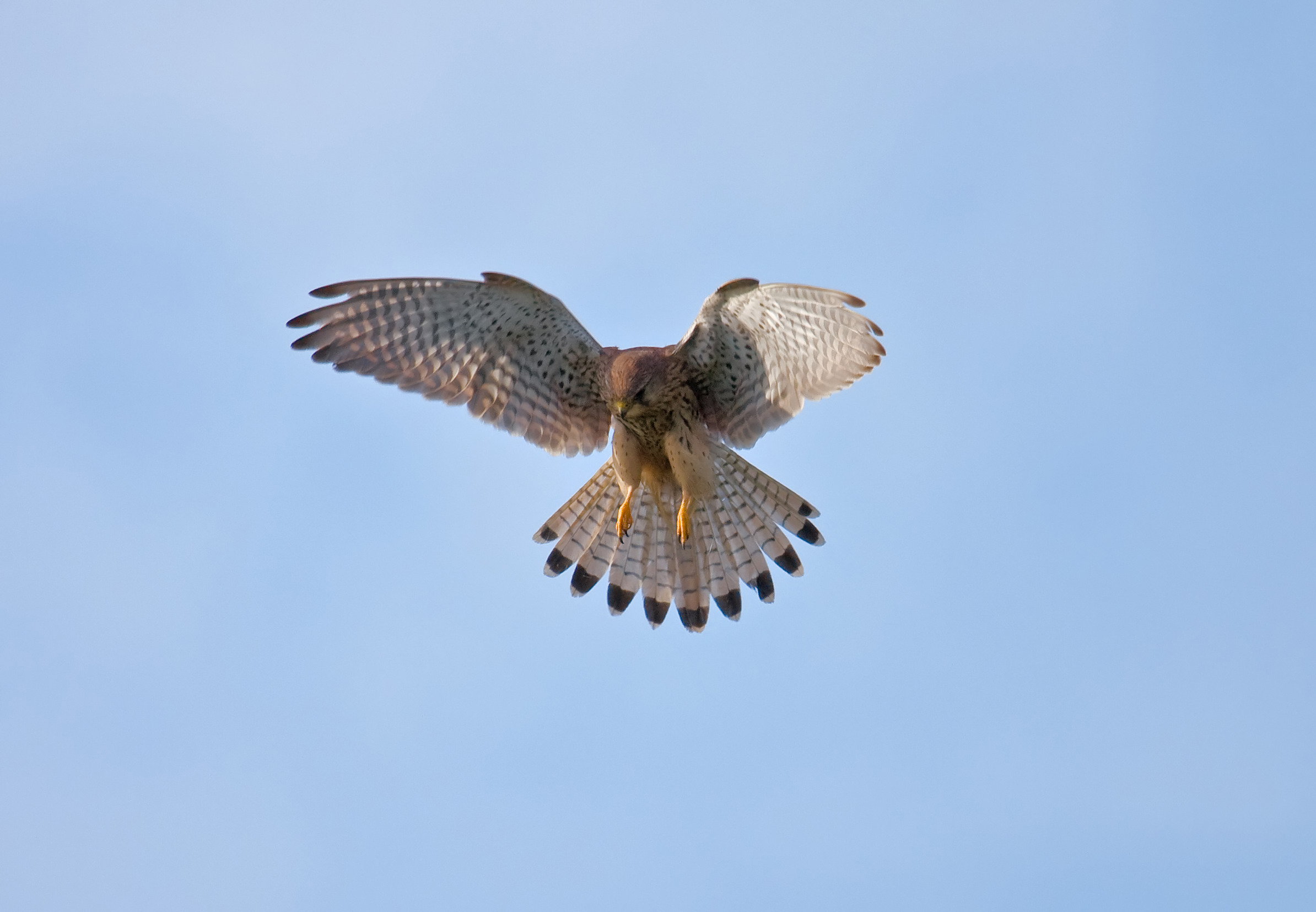
Eurasian kestrel, a common resident.

Order: Falconiformes Family: Falconidae

Falconidae is a family of diurnal birds of prey. They differ from hawks, eagles, and kites in that they kill with their beaks instead of their talons.

Common name	Binomial	Irish name	Status
Lesser kestrel	Falco naumanni	Mionphocaire gaoithe	B R
Common kestrel	Falco tinnunculus	Pocaire gaoithe	A
Red-footed falcon	Falco vespertinus	Fabhcún cosdearg	A
Merlin	Falco columbarius	Meirliún	A
Eurasian hobby	Falco subbuteo	Fabhcún coille	A
Gyrfalcon	Falco rusticolus	Fabhcún mór	A R
Peregrine falcon	Falco peregrinus	Fabhcún gorm	A

== Tyrant flycatchers, calyptura ==
Order: Passeriformes Family: Tyrannidae

Tyrant flycatchers occur throughout North and South America. They superficially resemble the Old World flycatchers, but are more robust and have stronger bills. They do not have the sophisticated vocal capabilities of the songbirds. Most, but not all, are rather plain. As the name implies, most are insectivorous.

Common name	Binomial	Irish name	Status
Eastern kingbird	Tyrannus tyrannus		A R

== Shrikes ==
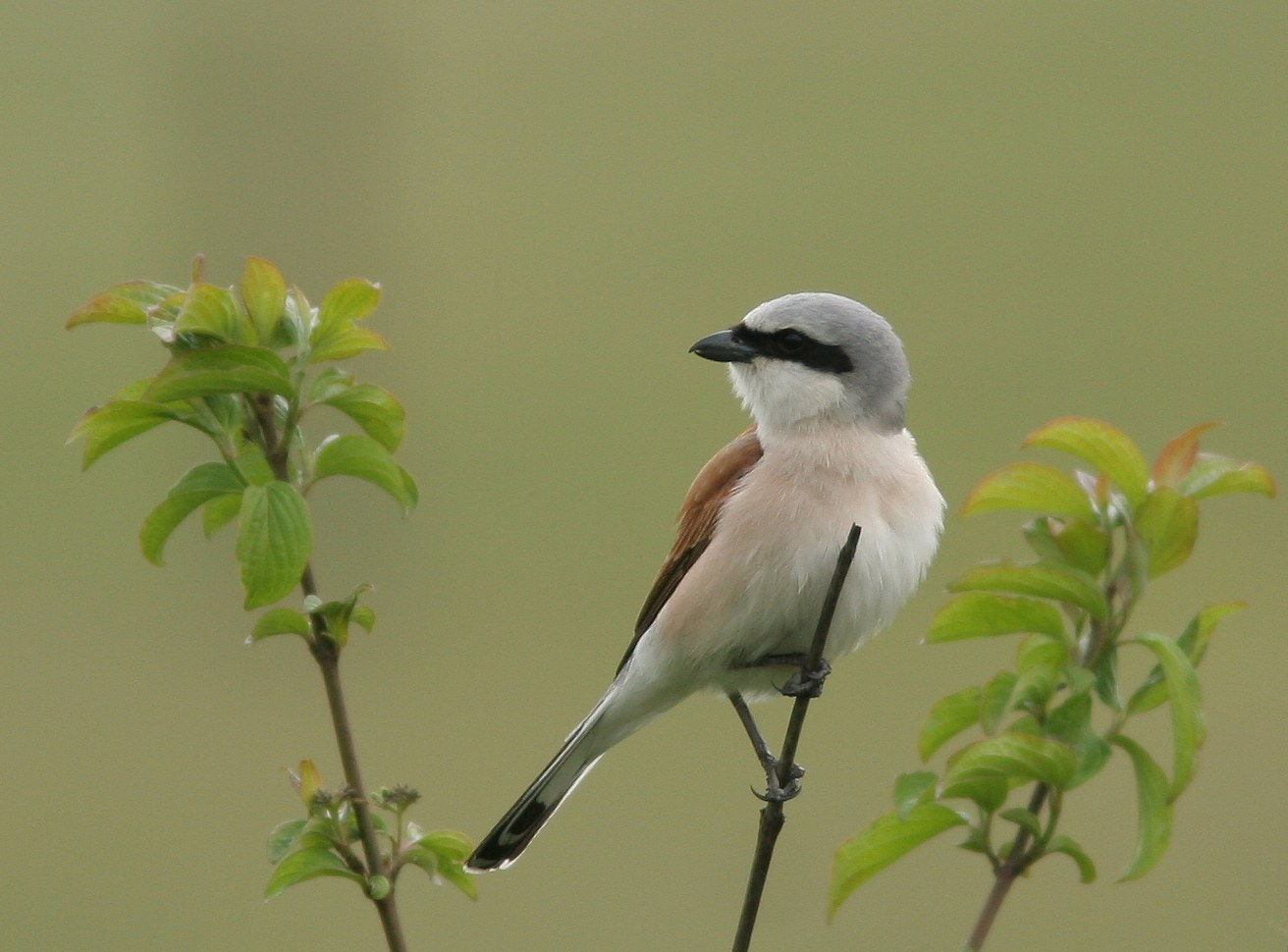
Red-backed shrike, a rare passage migrant.

Order: Passeriformes Family: Laniidae

Shrikes are passerine birds known for their habit of catching other birds and small animals and impaling the uneaten portions of their bodies on thorns. A shrike's beak is hooked, like that of a typical bird of prey.

Common name	Binomial	Irish name	Status
Brown shrike	Lanius cristatus	Scréachán donn	A R
Red-backed shrike	Lanius collurio	Scréachán droimrua	A
Isabelline shrike	Lanius isabellinus	Scréachán isibéalach	A R
Lesser grey shrike	Lanius minor	Mionscréachán liath	A R
Great grey shrike	Lanius excubitor	Mórscréachán liath	A R
Woodchat shrike	Lanius senator	Scréachán coille	A R

== Vireos, greenlets, shrike-babblers ==
Order: Passeriformes Family: Vireonidae

The vireos are a group of small to medium-sized passerine birds restricted to the New World. They are typically greenish in colour and resemble New World warblers apart from their heavier bills.

Common name	Binomial	Irish name	Status
Philadelphia vireo	Vireo philadelphicus	Glaséan Philadelphia	A R
Red-eyed vireo	Vireo olivaceus	Glaséan súildearg	A R

== Figbirds, orioles, turnagra ==
Order: Passeriformes Family: Oriolidae

The Old World orioles are colourful passerine birds. They are not related to the New World orioles.

Common name	Binomial	Irish name	Status
Eurasian golden oriole	Oriolus oriolus	Óiréal órga	A

== Crows, jays ==
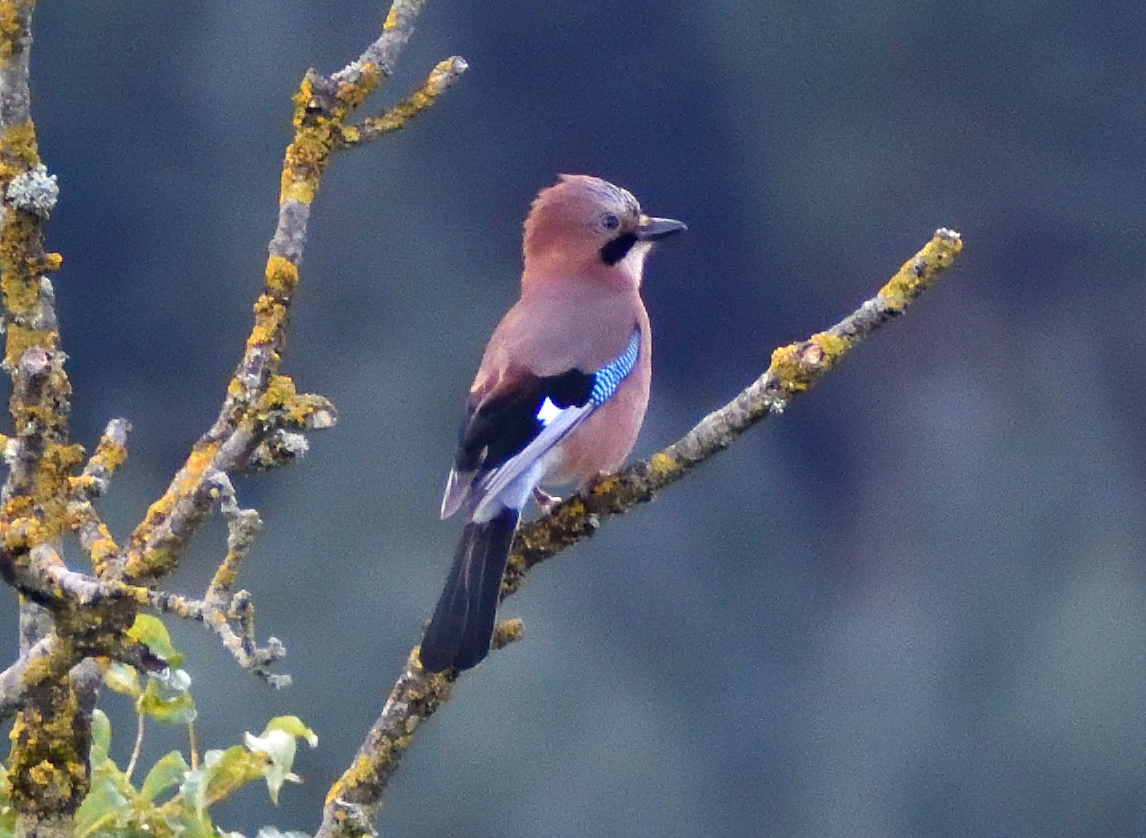
Eurasian jay of the Irish endemic subspecies G. g. hibernicus in Wicklow.

Order: Passeriformes Family: Corvidae

The family Corvidae includes crows, ravens, jackdaws, jays, choughs, magpies, treepies, nutcrackers, and ground jays. Corvids are above average in size among the Passeriformes, and some of the larger species show high levels of intelligence.

Common name	Binomial	Irish name	Status
Eurasian jay	Garrulus glandarius	Scréachóg / scéachóg choille	A
Eurasian magpie	Pica pica	Snag breac	A
Red-billed chough	Pyrrhocorax pyrrhocorax	Cág cosdearg	A
Eurasian jackdaw	Corvus monedula	Cág	A
Rook	Corvus frugilegus	Rúcach	A
Carrion crow	Corvus corone	Caróg dhubh	A
Hooded crow	Corvus cornix	Caróg liath	A
Northern raven	Corvus corax	Fiach dubh	A

== Waxwings ==
Order: Passeriformes Family: Bombycillidae

The waxwings are a group of birds with soft silky plumage and unique red tips to some of the wing feathers. In the Bohemian and cedar waxwings, these tips look like sealing wax and give the group its name. These are arboreal birds of northern forests. They live on insects in summer and berries in winter.

Common name	Binomial	Irish name	Status
Bohemian waxwing	Bombycilla garrulus	Síodeiteach	A
Cedar waxwing	Bombycilla cedrorum		A R

== Tits, chickadees ==
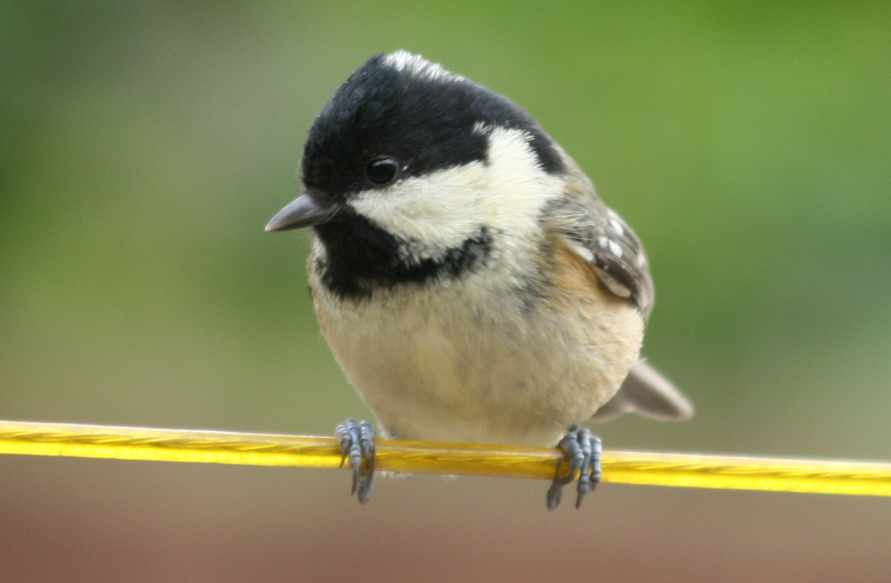
Coal tit, common in woods and gardens.

Order: Passeriformes Family: Paridae

The Paridae are mainly small stocky woodland species with short stout bills. Some have crests. They are adaptable birds, with a mixed diet including seeds and insects.

Common name	Binomial	Irish name	Status
Coal tit	Periparus ater	Meantán dubh	A
Marsh tit	Poecile palustris	Meantán lathaí	A R
Eurasian blue tit	Cyanistes caeruleus	Meantán gorm	A
Great tit	Parus major	Meantán mór	A

== Penduline tits ==
Order: Passeriformes Family: Remizidae

The penduline-tits are a group of small passerine birds related to the true tits. They are insectivores.

Common name	Binomial	Irish name	Status
Eurasian penduline tit	Remiz pendulinus		A R

== Bearded reedling ==
Order: Passeriformes Family: Panuridae

This species, the only one in its family, is found in reed beds throughout temperate Europe and Asia.

Common name	Binomial	Irish name	Status
Bearded reedling	Panurus biarmicus	Meantán croiméalach	A

== Larks ==
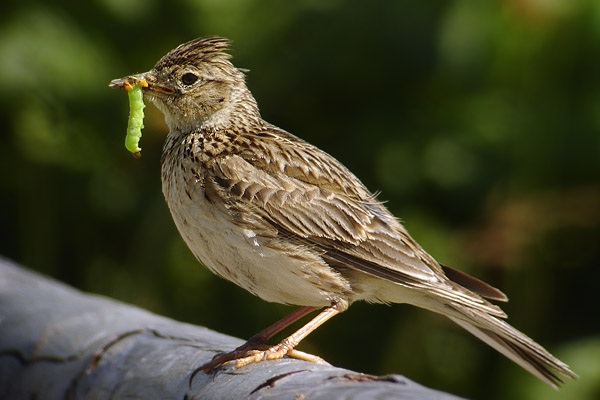
Eurasian skylark, a common resident.

Order: Passeriformes Family: Alaudidae

Larks are small terrestrial birds with often extravagant songs and display flights. Most larks are fairly dull in appearance. Their food is insects and seeds.

Common name	Binomial	Irish name	Status
Wood lark	Lullula arborea	Fuiseog choille	A R
Eurasian skylark	Alauda arvensis	Fuiseog	A
Horned lark	Eremophila alpestris	Fuiseog adharcach	A
Greater short-toed lark	Calandrella brachydactyla	Fuiseog ladharghearr	A R

== Swallows, martins ==
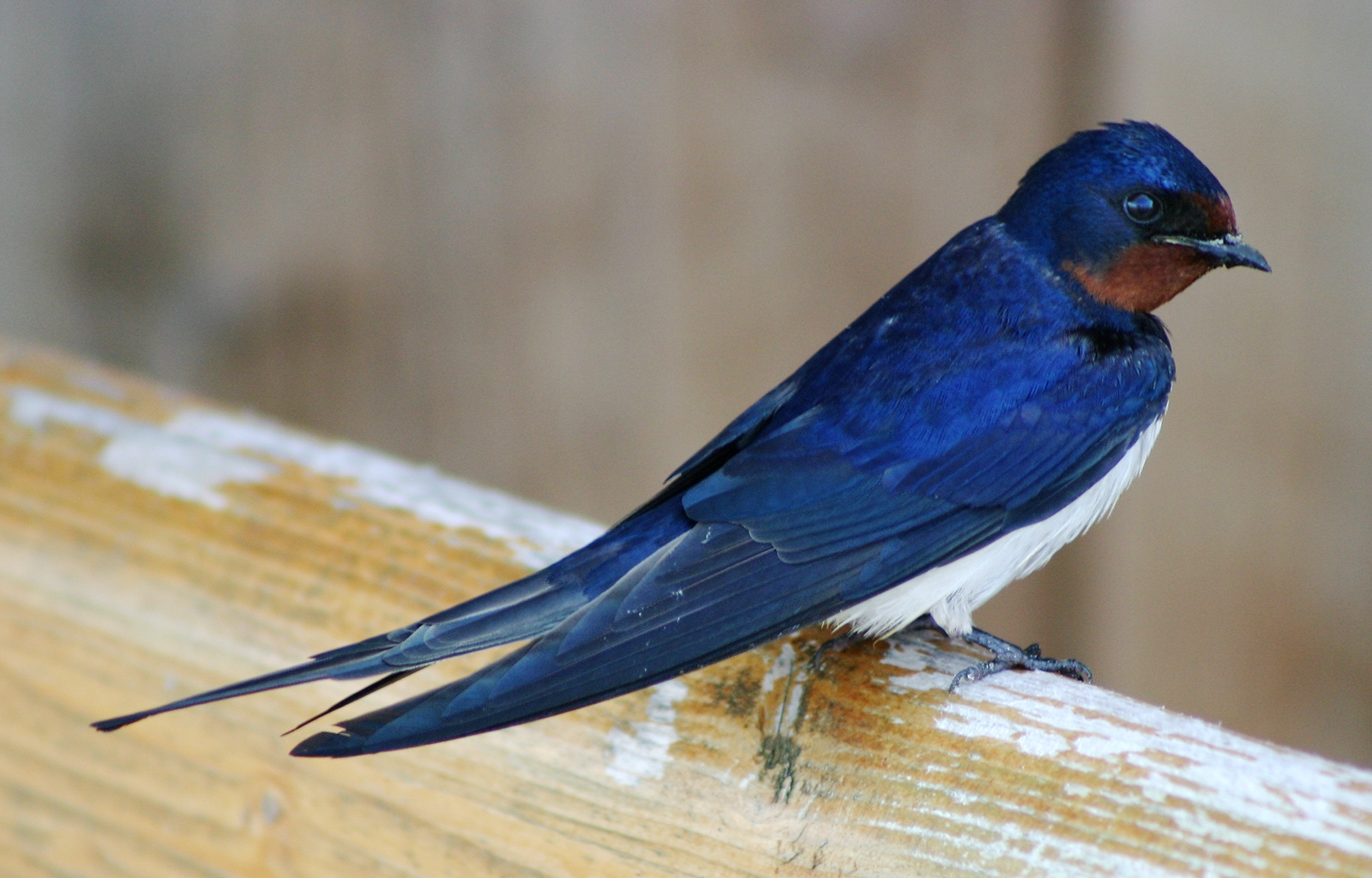
Barn swallow, a very common summer visitor.

Order: Passeriformes Family: Hirundinidae

The family Hirundinidae is adapted to aerial feeding. They have a slender streamlined body, long pointed wings, and a short bill with a wide gape. The feet are adapted to perching rather than walking, and the front toes are partially joined at the base.

Common name	Binomial	Irish name	Status
Sand martin	Riparia riparia	Gabhlán gainimh	A
Barn swallow	Hirundo rustica	Fáinleog	A
Common house martin	Delichon urbicum	Gabhlán binne	A
Red-rumped swallow	Cecropis daurica	Fáinleog ruaphrompach	A
American cliff swallow	Petrochelidon pyrrhonota	Fáinleog aille Mheiriceánach	A R

== Bush warblers ==
Order: Passeriformes Family: Cettiidae

The members of this family are found throughout Africa, Asia, and Polynesia. This species is the only one found regularly in Europe. It first bred in Ireland in 2022.

Common name	Binomial	Irish name	Status
Cetti's warbler	Cettia cetti	Ceolaire Cetti	A

== Bushtits ==
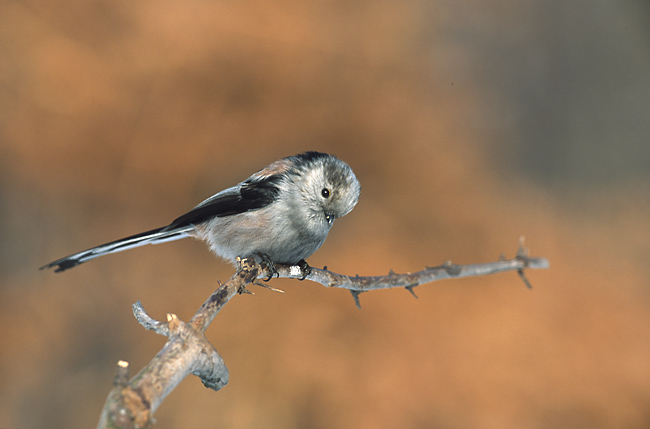
Long-tailed tit, a common resident.

Order: Passeriformes Family: Aegithalidae

Long-tailed tits are a group of small passerine birds with medium to long tails. They make woven bag nests in trees. Most eat a mixed diet which includes insects.

Common name	Binomial	Irish name	Status
Long-tailed tit	Aegithalos caudatus	Meantán earrfhada	A

== Leaf warblers and allies ==
Order: Passeriformes Family: Phylloscopidae

Leaf warblers are a family of small insectivorous birds found mostly in Eurasia and ranging into Wallacea and Africa. The species are of various sizes, often green-plumaged above and yellow below, or more subdued with greyish-green to greyish-brown colours.

Common name	Binomial	Irish name	Status
Wood warbler	Phylloscopus sibilatrix	Ceolaire coille	A
Western Bonelli's warbler	Phylloscopus bonelli	Ceolaire Bonelli	A R
Hume's leaf warbler	Phylloscopus humei	Ceolaire Hume	A R
Yellow-browed warbler	Phylloscopus inornatus	Ceolaire buímhalach	A
Pallas's leaf warbler	Phylloscopus proregulus	Ceolaire Pallas	A
Radde's warbler	Phylloscopus schwarzi	Ceolaire Radde	A R
Dusky warbler	Phylloscopus fuscatus	Ceolaire breacdhorcha	A R
Willow warbler	Phylloscopus trochilus	Ceolaire sailí	A
Common chiffchaff	Phylloscopus collybita	Tiuf-teaf	A
Iberian chiffchaff	Phylloscopus ibericus	Tiuf-teaf Ibéarach	A R
Greenish warbler	Phylloscopus trochiloides	Ceolaire scothghlas	A
Arctic warbler	Phylloscopus borealis	Ceolaire Artach	A R

== Reed warblers and allies ==
Order: Passeriformes Family: Acrocephalidae

The members of this family are usually rather large for "warblers". Most are rather plain olivaceous brown above with much yellow to beige below. They are usually found in open woodland, reedbeds, or tall grass. The family occurs mostly in southern to western Eurasia and surroundings, but it also ranges far into the Pacific, with some species in Africa.

Common name	Binomial	Irish name	Status
Great reed warbler	Acrocephalus arundinaceus	Ceolaire giolcaí mór	A R
Aquatic warbler	Acrocephalus paludicola	Ceolaire uisce	A R
Sedge warbler	Acrocephalus schoenobaenus	Ceolaire cíbe	A
Paddyfield warbler	Acrocephalus agricola	Ceolaire gort ríse	A R
Blyth's reed warbler	Acrocephalus dumetorum	Ceolaire Blyth	A R
Eurasian reed warbler	Acrocephalus scirpaceus	Ceolaire giolcaí	A
Marsh warbler	Acrocephalus palustris	Ceolaire corraigh	A R
Booted warbler	Iduna caligata	Ceolaire cuaráin	A R
Sykes's warbler	Iduna rama	Ceolaire Syke	A R
Eastern olivaceous warbler	Iduna pallida	Ceolaire bánlíoch	A R
Melodious warbler	Hippolais polyglotta	Ceolaire binn	A R
Icterine warbler	Hippolais icterina	Ceolaire ictireach	A R

== Grassbirds and allies ==
Order: Passeriformes Family: Locustellidae

Locustellidae are a family of small insectivorous songbirds found mainly in Eurasia, Africa, and the Australian region. They are smallish birds with tails that are usually long and pointed, and tend to be drab brownish or buffy all over.

Common name	Binomial	Irish name	Status
Pallas's grasshopper warbler	Helopsaltes certhiola	Ceolaire casarnaí Pallas	A R
Savi's warbler	Locustella luscinioides	Ceolaire Savi	A R
Common grasshopper warbler	Locustella naevia	Ceolaire casarnaí	A

== Cisticolas and allies ==
Order: Passeriformes Family: Cisticolidae

The Cisticolidae are warblers found mainly in warmer southern regions of the Old World. They are generally very small birds of drab brown or grey appearance found in open country such as grassland or scrub.

Common name	Binomial	Irish name	Status
Zitting cisticola	Cisticola juncidis	Ceolaire feanearrach	A R

== Sylviid babblers ==
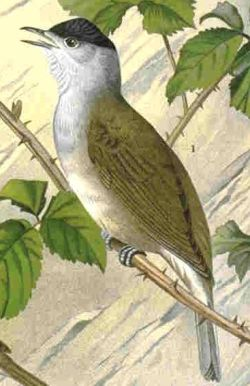
Eurasian blackcap, most places in Ireland have residents.

Order: Passeriformes Family: Sylviidae

The family Sylviidae is a group of small insectivorous passerine birds. They mainly occur as breeding species, as another common name (Old World warblers) implies, in Europe, Asia, and, to a lesser extent, Africa. Most are of generally undistinguished appearance, but many have distinctive songs.

Common name	Binomial	Irish name	Status
Eurasian blackcap	Sylvia atricapilla	Caipín dubh	A
Garden warbler	Sylvia borin	Ceolaire garraí	A
Barred warbler	Curruca nisoria	Ceolaire barrach	A
Lesser whitethroat	Curruca curruca	Gilphíb bheag	A
Sardinian warbler	Curruca melanocephala	Ceolaire Sairdíneach	A R
Western subalpine warbler	Curruca iberiae		A
Eastern subalpine warbler	Curruca cantillans	Ceolaire fo-Alpach	A R
Common whitethroat	Curruca communis	Gilbhíb mór	A
Dartford warbler	Curruca undata	Ceolaire fraoigh	A R

== Goldcrests, kinglets ==
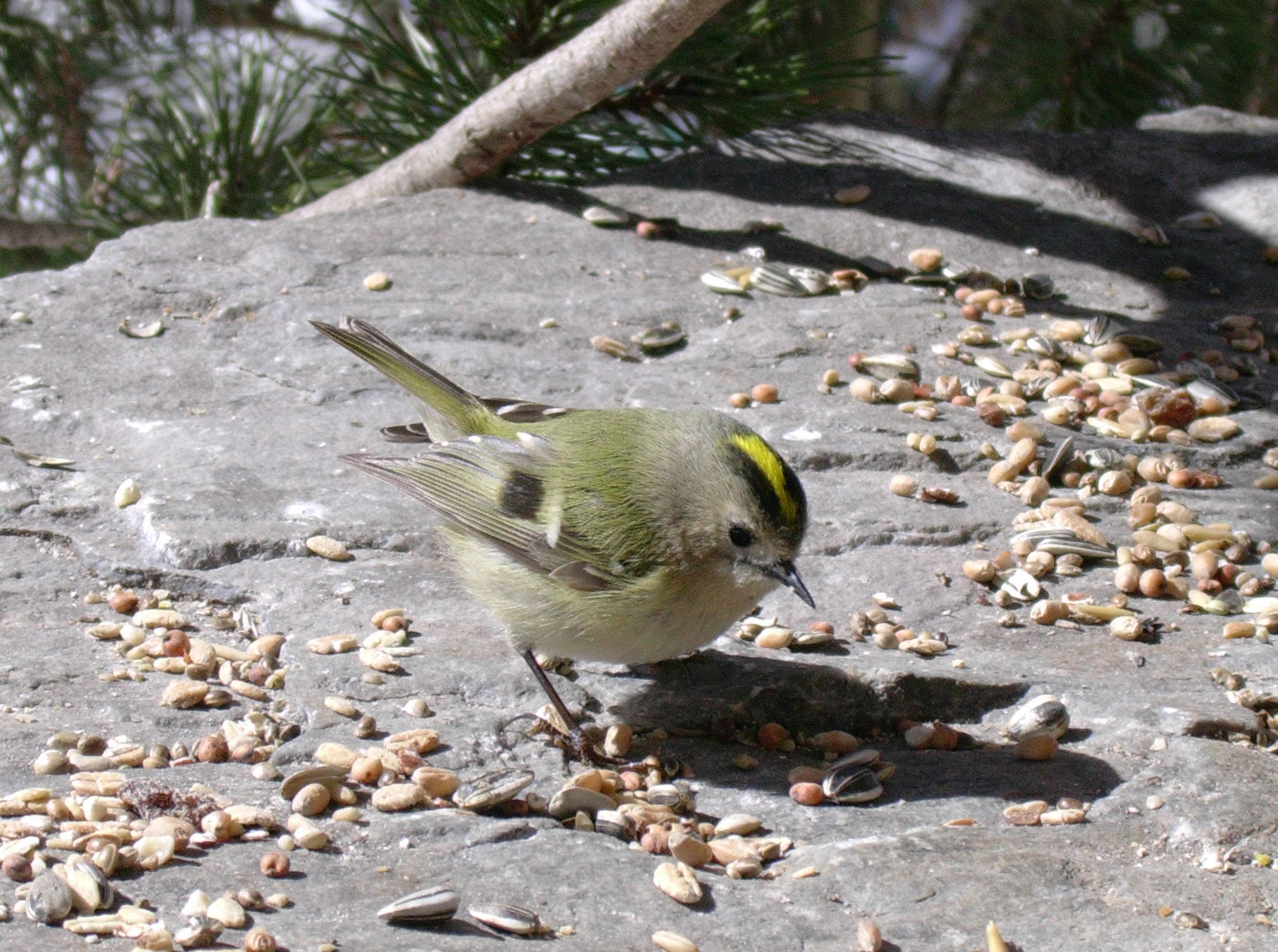
Goldcrest, Ireland's smallest bird.

Order: Passeriformes Family: Regulidae

The kinglets, also called crests, are a small group of birds which were sometimes included in the Old World warblers, family Sylviidae.

Common name	Binomial	Irish name	Status
Common firecrest	Regulus ignicapillus	Lasairchíor	A
Goldcrest	Regulus regulus	Cíorbhuí	A
Ruby-crowned kinglet	Corthylio calendula		A R

== Wrens ==
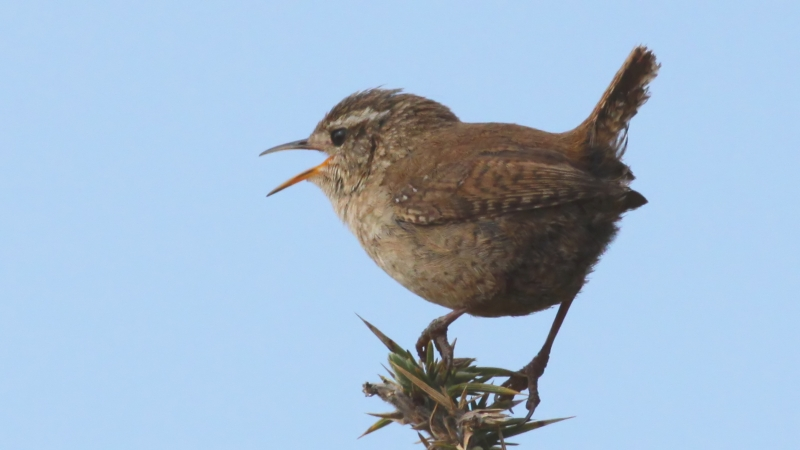
Eurasian wren in County Cork. "Hunting the wren" is an old tradition in Ireland.

Order: Passeriformes Family: Troglodytidae

The wrens are mainly small and inconspicuous except for their loud songs. These birds have short wings and thin down-turned bills. Several species often hold their tails upright. All are insectivorous.

Common name	Binomial	Irish name	Status
Eurasian wren	Troglodytes troglodytes	Dreolín	A

== Treecreepers ==
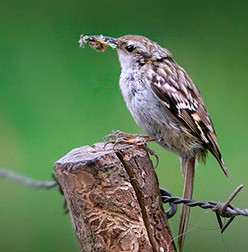
Eurasian treecreeper, an inconspicuous resident.

Order: Passeriformes Family: Certhiidae

Treecreepers are small woodland birds, brown above and white below. They have thin pointed down-curved bills, which they use to extricate insects from bark. They have stiff tail feathers, like woodpeckers, which they use to support themselves on vertical trees.

Common name	Binomial	Irish name	Status
Eurasian treecreeper	Certhia familiaris	Snag coiteann	A

== Mockingbirds, thrashers ==
Order: Passeriformes Family: Mimidae

The mimids are a family of passerine birds that includes thrashers, mockingbirds, tremblers, and the New World catbirds. These birds are notable for their vocalizations, especially their ability to mimic a wide variety of birds and other sounds heard outdoors. Their colouring tends towards dull-greys and browns.

Common name	Binomial	Irish name	Status
Grey catbird	Dumetella carolinensis	Catéan liath	A R

== Starlings, rhabdornis ==
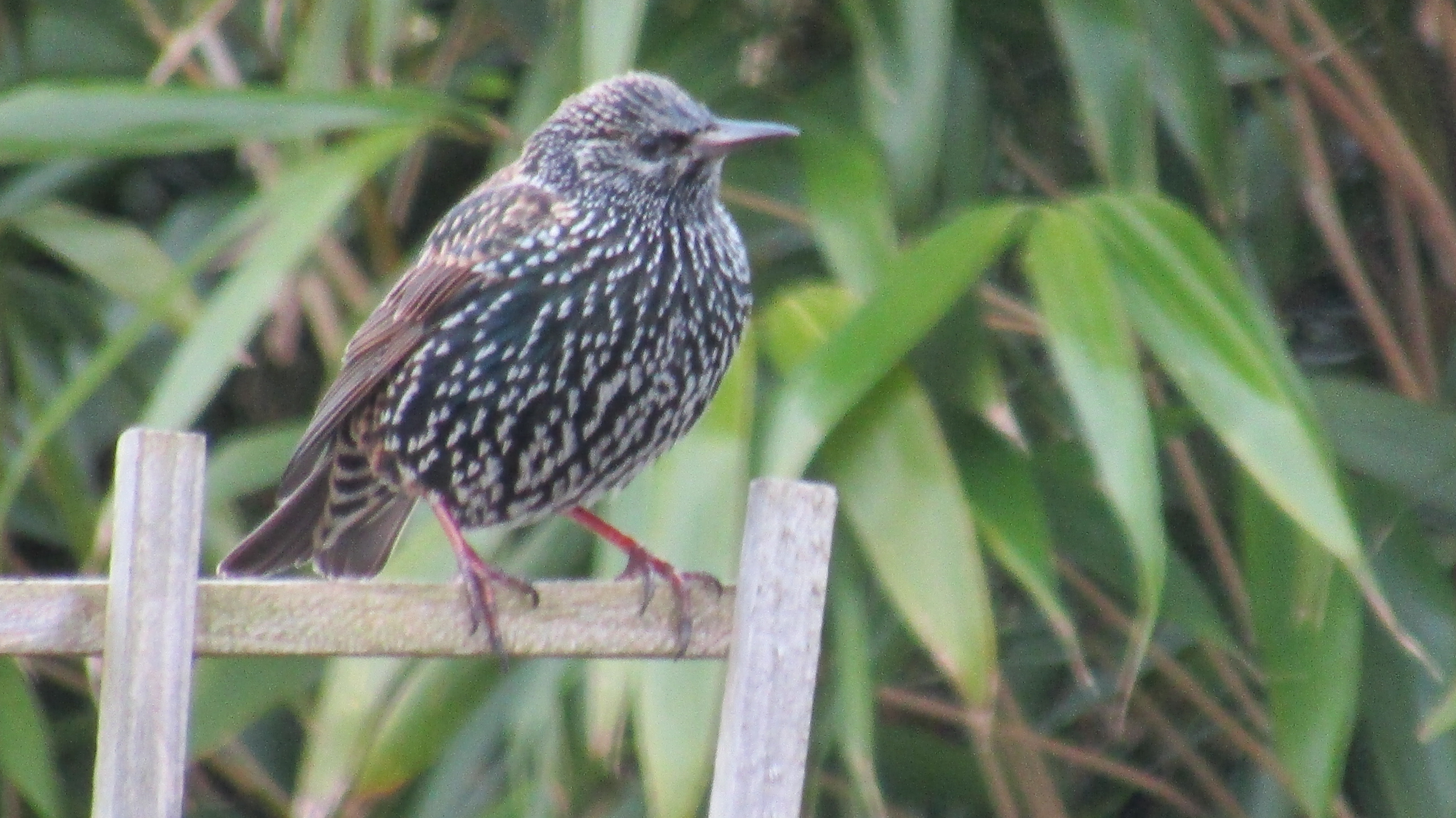
Common starling, a common breeding bird with more arriving in winter.

Order: Passeriformes Family: Sturnidae

Starlings are small to medium-sized passerine birds. Their flight is strong and direct and they are very gregarious. Their preferred habitat is fairly open country. They eat insects and fruit. Plumage is typically dark with a metallic sheen.

Common name	Binomial	Irish name	Status
Rosy starling	Pastor roseus	Druid rósach	A
Common starling	Sturnus vulgaris	Druid	A

== Thrushes ==
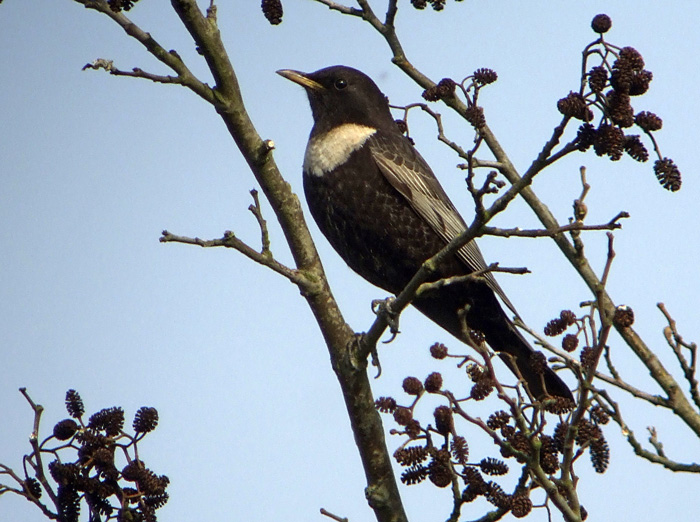
Ring ouzel, a rare summer visitor to high mountains, now nearly extinct in Ireland with only one pair remaining in 2024.

Order: Passeriformes Family: Turdidae

The thrushes are a group of passerine birds that occur mainly in the Old World. They are plump, soft plumaged, small to medium-sized insectivores or sometimes omnivores, often feeding on the ground. Many have attractive songs.

Common name	Binomial	Irish name	Status
Siberian thrush	Geokichla sibirica	Smólach Sibéarach	A R
White's thrush	Zoothera aurea	Smólach White	A R
Veery	Catharus fuscescens		A R
Grey-cheeked thrush	Catharus minimus	Smólach glasleicneach	A R
Swainson's thrush	Catharus ustulatus	Smólach Swainson	A R
Hermit thrush	Catharus guttatus	Smólach ceallaigh	A R
Ring ouzel	Turdus torquatus	Lon creige	A
Eurasian blackbird	Turdus merula	Lon dubh	A
Fieldfare	Turdus pilaris	Sacán	A
Redwing	Turdus iliacus	Deargán sneachta	A
Song thrush	Turdus philomelos	Smólach ceoil	A
Mistle thrush	Turdus viscivorus	Smólach mór	A
American robin	Turdus migratorius	Spideog	A R

== Chats, Old World flycatchers ==
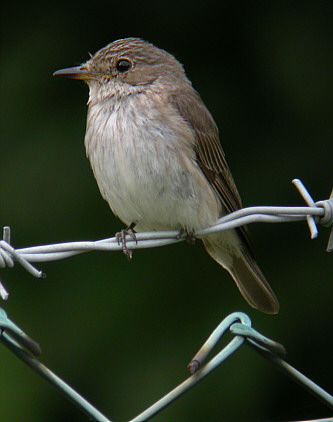
Spotted flycatcher, one of the last summer visitors to arrive.

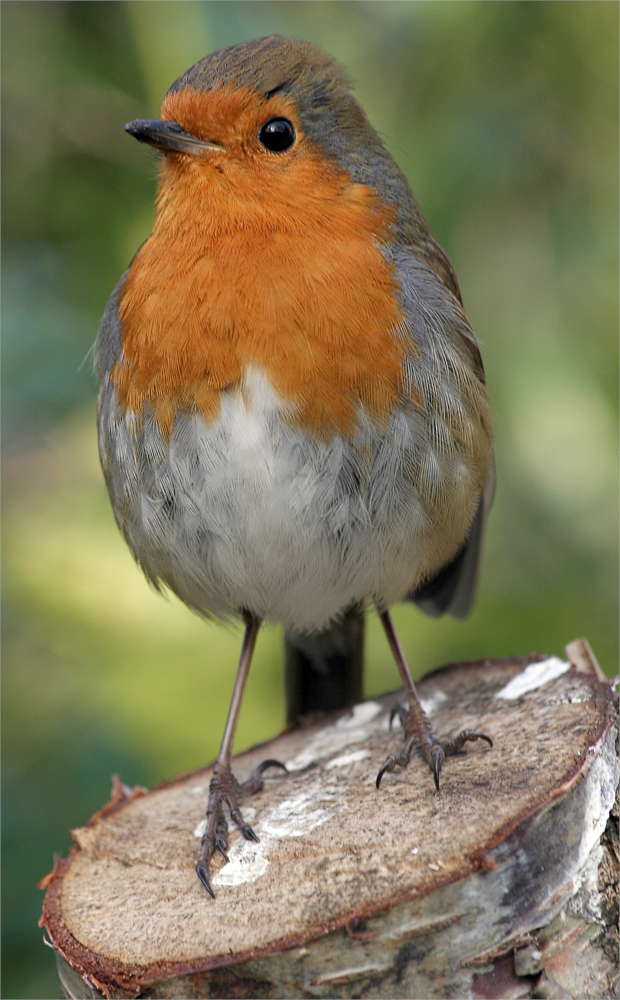
European robin, a common and familiar resident.

Order: Passeriformes Family: Muscicapidae

Old World flycatchers are a large family of mainly small arboreal insectivores. The appearance of these birds is highly varied, but they mostly have weak songs and harsh calls.

Common name	Binomial	Irish name	Status
Rufous-tailed scrub robin	Cercotrichas galactotes	Torspideog ruadhonn	A R
Spotted flycatcher	Muscicapa striata	Cuilire liath	A
European robin	Erithacus rubecula	Spideog	A
Bluethroat	Luscinia svecica	Gormphíb	A
Thrush nightingale	Luscinia luscinia	Filiméala smólaigh	A R
Common nightingale	Luscinia megarhynchos	Filiméala	A
Red-flanked bluetail	Tarsiger cyanurus	An t-earrghorm rua-chliathánach	A R
Taiga flycatcher	Ficedula albicilla		A R
Red-breasted flycatcher	Ficedula parva	Cuilire broinnrua	A
European pied flycatcher	Ficedula hypoleuca	Cuilire alabhreac	A
Collared flycatcher	Ficedula albicollis		A R
Black redstart	Phoenicurus ochruros	Earrdheargán dubh	A
Common redstart	Phoenicurus phoenicurus	Earrdheargán	A
Common rock thrush	Monticola saxatilis	Smólach aille	A R
Whinchat	Saxicola rubetra	Caislín aitinn	A
European stonechat	Saxicola rubicola	Caislín cloch	A
Siberian stonechat	Saxicola maurus		A R
Northern wheatear	Oenanthe oenanthe	Clochrán	A
Isabelline wheatear	Oenanthe isabellina	Clochrán gainimh	A R
Desert wheatear	Oenanthe deserti	Clochrán fásaigh	A R
Western black-eared wheatear	Oenanthe hispanica	Clochrán cluasdubh	A R
Pied wheatear	Oenanthe pleschanka	Clochrán alabhreac	A
Black wheatear / White-crowned wheatear	Oenanthe leucura / Oenanthe leucopyga	Clochrán dubh / -	A R

== Dippers ==
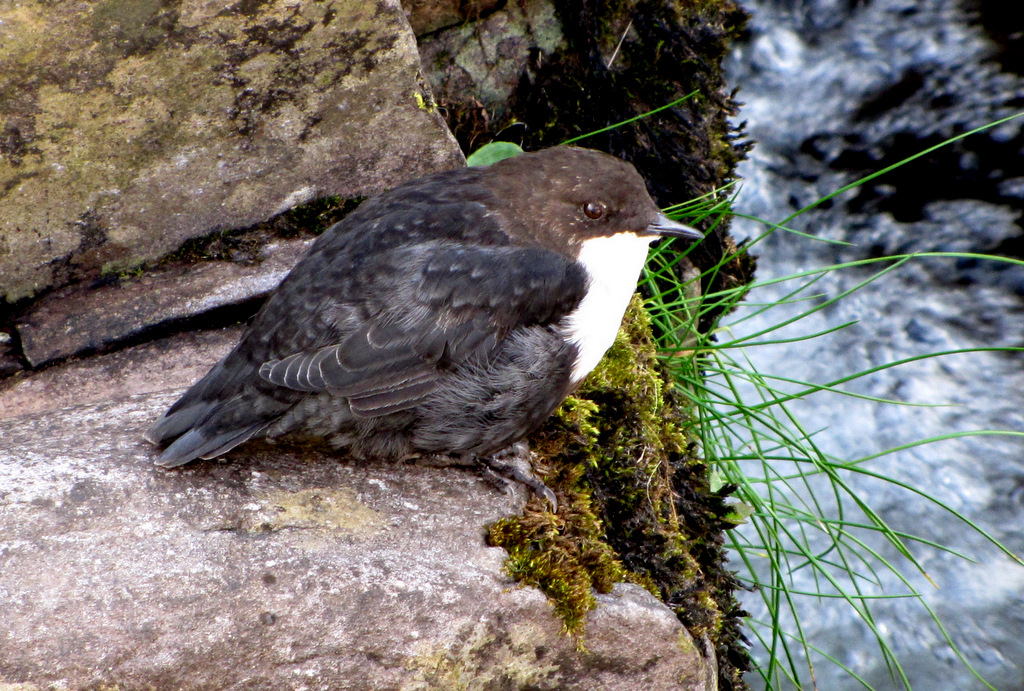
White-throated dipper C. c. hibernicus in County Kerry

Order: Passeriformes Family: Cinclidae

Dippers are a group of perching birds whose habitat includes aquatic environments in the Americas, Europe, and Asia. They are named for their bobbing or dipping movements.

Common name	Binomial	Irish name	Status
White-throated dipper	Cinclus cinclus	Gabha dubh	A

== Old World sparrows, snowfinches ==
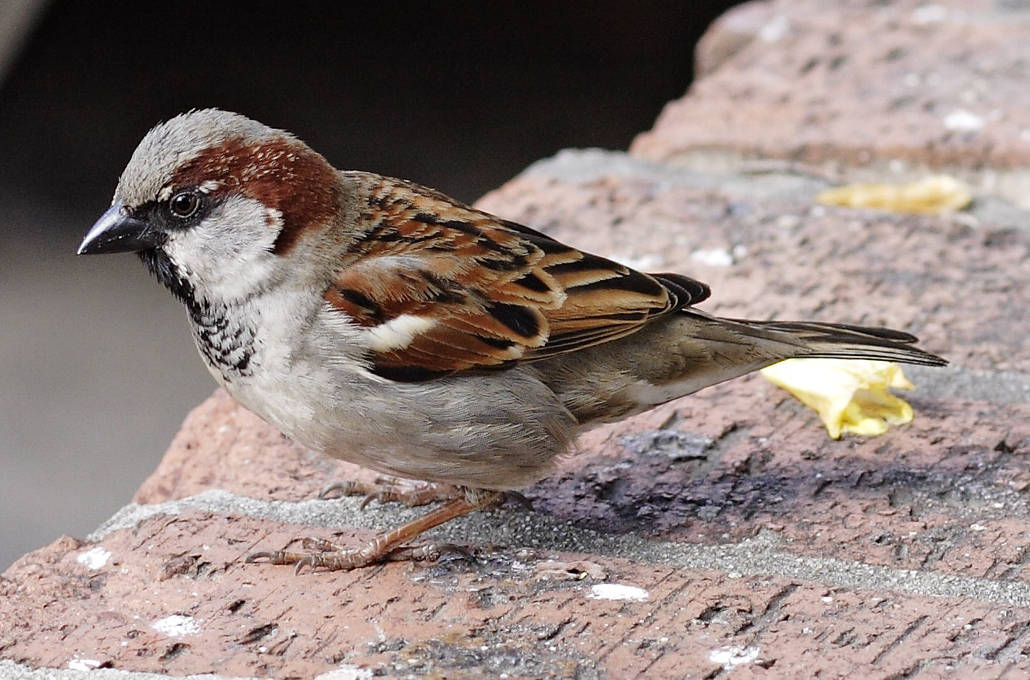
House sparrow, common around human habitation.

Order: Passeriformes Family: Passeridae

Sparrows are small passerine birds. In general, sparrows tend to be small, plump, brown or grey birds with short tails and short powerful beaks. Sparrows are seed eaters, but they also consume small insects.

Common name	Binomial	Irish name	Status
House sparrow	Passer domesticus	Gealbhan binne	A
Tree sparrow	Passer montanus	Gealbhan crainn	A

== Accentors ==
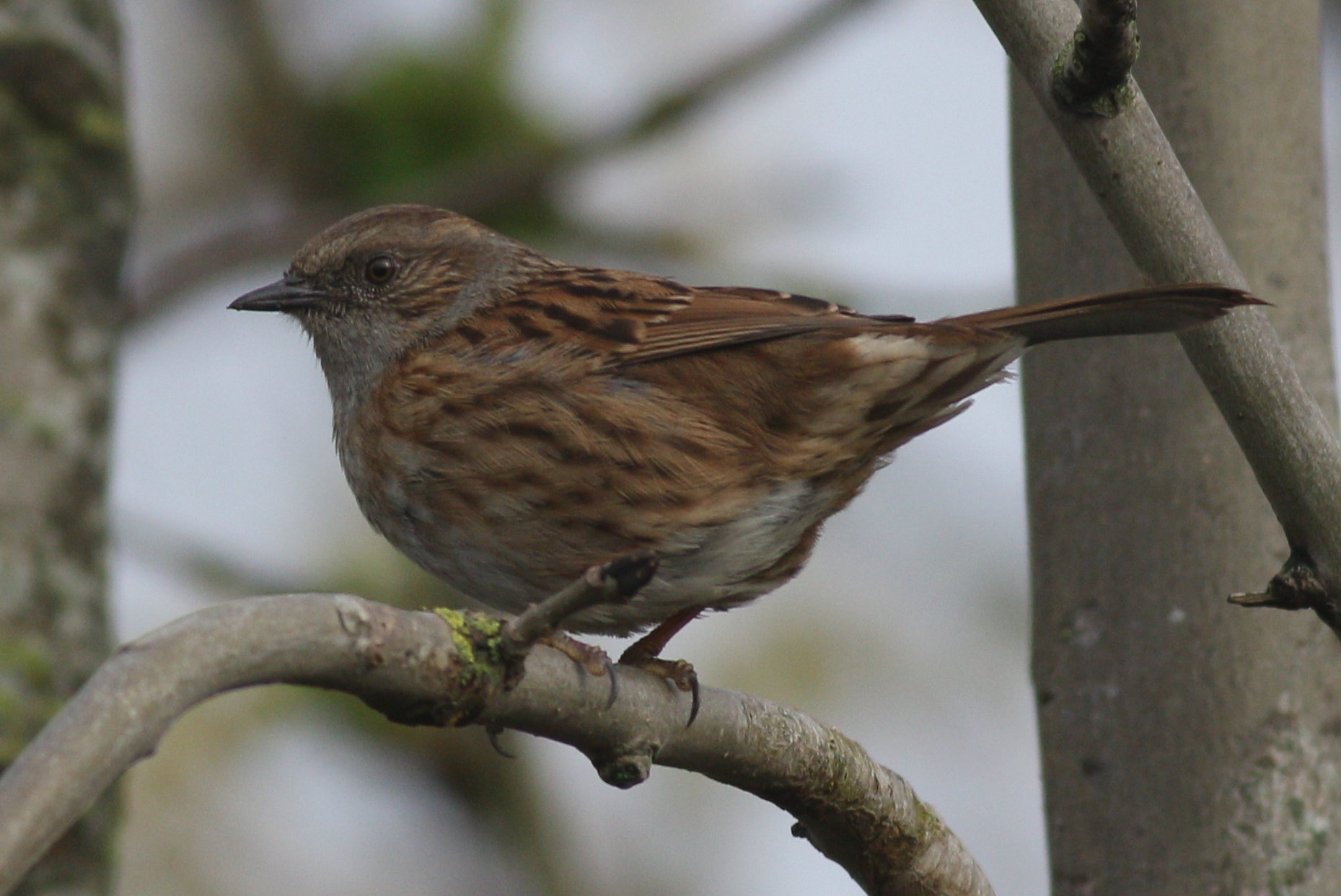
A dunnock in Dublin.

Order: Passeriformes Family: Prunellidae

The accentors are the only bird family which is completely endemic to the Palearctic. They are small, fairly drab species superficially similar to Old World sparrows.

Common name	Binomial	Irish name	Status
Dunnock	Prunella modularis	Donnóg	A

== Wagtails, pipits ==
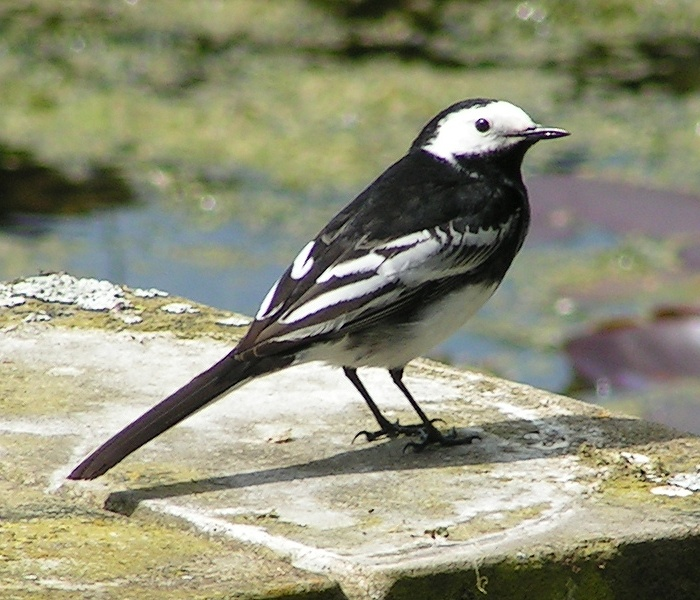
Pied wagtail, a common and widespread resident.

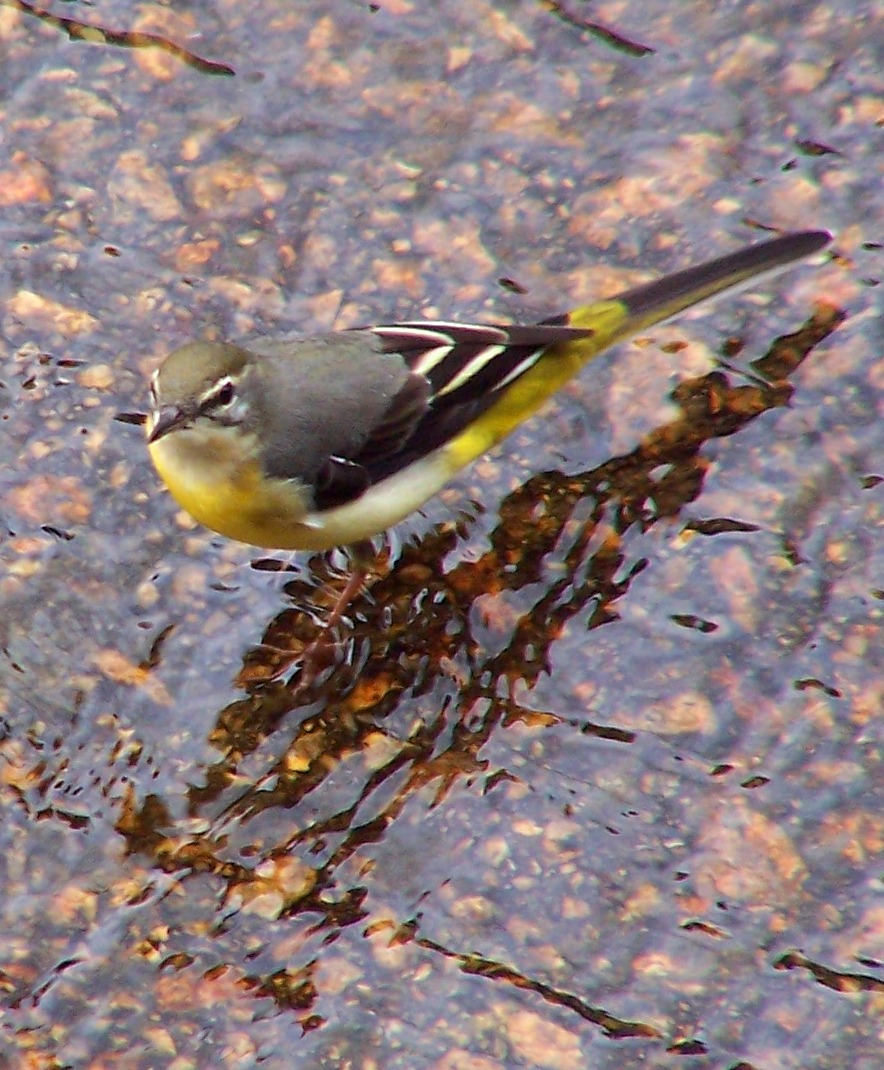
Grey wagtail is slightly larger than white wagtail.

Order: Passeriformes Family: Motacillidae

Motacillidae is a family of small passerine birds with medium to long tails. They include the wagtails, longclaws and pipits. They are slender, ground feeding insectivores of open country.

Two subspecies of white wagtail occur in Ireland:

- Motacilla alba yarrelli, "pied wagtail", a common breeding resident.
- M. a. alba, nominate subspecies occurring as a migrant.

Common name	Binomial	Irish name	Status
Western yellow wagtail	Motacilla flava	Glasóg bhuí iartharach	A
Eastern yellow wagtail	Motacilla tschutschensis	Glasóg bhuí oirthearach	A R
Citrine wagtail	Motacilla citreola	Glasóg chiotrónach	A R
Grey wagtail	Motacilla cinerea	Glasóg liath	A
White wagtail	Motacilla alba	Glasóg shráide / glasóg bhán	A
Richard's pipit	Anthus richardi	Riabhóg Richard	A
Tawny pipit	Anthus campestris	Riabhóg dhonn	A R
Meadow pipit	Anthus pratensis	Riabhóg mhóna	A
Tree pipit	Anthus trivialis	Riabhóg choille	A
Olive-backed pipit	Anthus hodgsoni	Riabhóg dhroimghlas	A R
Pechora pipit	Anthus gustavi	Riabhóg Pechora	A R
Red-throated pipit	Anthus cervinus	Riabhóg phíbrua	A R
Buff-bellied pipit	Anthus rubescens	Riabhóg Mheiriceánach	A R
Water pipit	Anthus spinoletta	Riabhóg uisce	A
European rock pipit	Anthus petrosus	Riabhóg chladaigh	A

== Finches ==
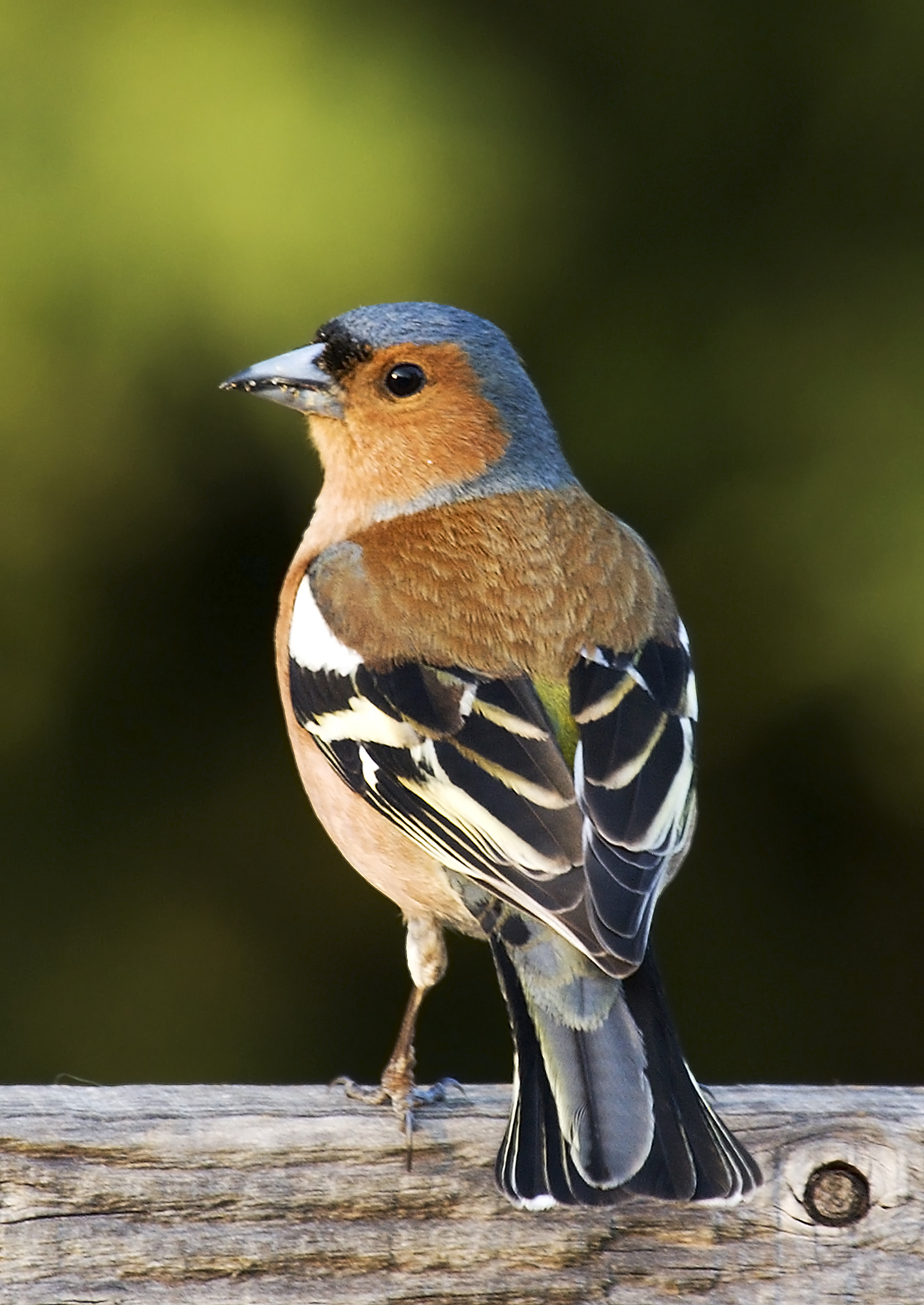
Eurasian chaffinch, a very common resident.

Order: Passeriformes Family: Fringillidae

Finches are seed-eating passerine birds that are small to moderately large and have a strong beak, usually conical and in some species very large. All have twelve tail feathers and nine primaries. These birds have a bouncing flight with alternating bouts of flapping and gliding on closed wings, and most sing well.

Common name	Binomial	Irish name	Status
Eurasian chaffinch	Fringilla coelebs	Rí rua	A
Brambling	Fringilla montifringilla	Breacán	A
Hawfinch	Coccothraustes coccothraustes	Glasán gobmhór	A
Eurasian bullfinch	Pyrrhula pyrrhula	Corcrán coille	A
Common rosefinch	Carpodacus erythrinus	Rósghlasán coiteann	A
European greenfinch	Chloris chloris	Glasán darach	A
Twite	Linaria flavirostris	Gleoiseach sléibhe	A
Common linnet	Linaria cannabina	Gleoiseach	A
Common redpoll	Acanthis flammea	Deargéadan	A
Lesser redpoll	Acanthis cabaret	Deargéadan beag	A
Arctic redpoll	Acanthis hornemanni	Deargéadan Artach	A R
Red crossbill	Loxia curvirostra	Crosghob rua	A
Two-barred crossbill	Loxia leucoptera	Crosghob báneiteach	A R
European goldfinch	Carduelis carduelis	Lasair choille	A
European serin	Serinus serinus	Seirín	A R
Eurasian siskin	Spinus spinus	Siscín	A

== Longspurs, snow buntings ==
Order: Passeriformes Family: Calcariidae

The Calcariidae are a group of passerine birds that had been traditionally grouped with the New World sparrows, but differ in a number of respects and are usually found in open grassy areas.

Common name	Binomial	Irish name	Status
Lapland longspur	Calcarius lapponicus	Gealóg Laplannach	A
Snow bunting	Plectrophenax nivalis	Gealóg shneachta	A

== Buntings ==
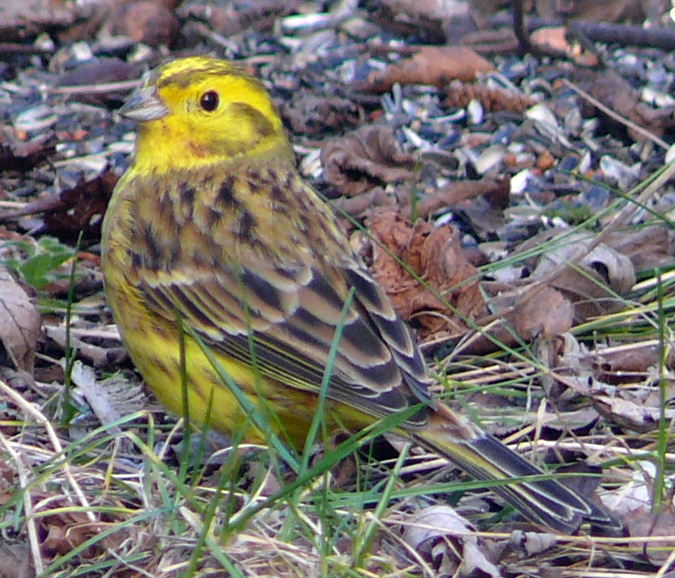
Yellowhammer, a declining resident.

Order: Passeriformes Family: Emberizidae

Emberizidae is a family of passerine birds containing a single genus. Until 2017, the New World sparrows (Passerellidae) were also considered part of this family.

Common name	Binomial	Irish name	Status
Black-headed bunting	Emberiza melanocephala	Gealóg cheanndubh	A R
Corn bunting	Emberiza calandra	Gealóg bhuachair	A
Yellowhammer	Emberiza citrinella	Buíóg	A
Pine bunting	Emberiza leucocephalos	Gealóg phéine	A R
Ortolan bunting	Emberiza hortulana	Gealóg gharraí	A
Cirl bunting	Emberiza cirlus	Cirlghealóg	A R
Little bunting	Emberiza pusilla	Gealóg bheag	A
Rustic bunting	Emberiza rustica	Gealóg thuathúil	A R
Yellow-breasted bunting	Emberiza aureola	Gealóg bhroinnbhuí	A R
Common reed bunting	Emberiza schoeniclus	Gealóg ghiolcaí	A

== New World sparrows ==
Order: Passeriformes Family: Passerellidae

Until 2017, these species were considered part of the family Emberizidae. Most of the species are known as sparrows, but these birds are not closely related to the Old World sparrows which are in the family Passeridae. Many of these have distinctive head patterns.

Common name	Binomial	Irish name	Status
Red fox sparrow	Passerella iliaca	Gealbhan sionnaigh	A R
Dark-eyed junco	Junco hyemalis	Luachairín shúildubh	A R
White-crowned sparrow	Zonotrichia leucophrys	Gealbhan bánchorónach	A R
White-throated sparrow	Zonotrichia albicollis	Gealbhan píbgheal	A R

== Oropendolas, New World orioles, New World blackbirds ==
Order: Passeriformes Family: Icteridae

The icterids are a group of small to medium-sized, often colourful, passerine birds restricted to the New World and include the grackles, New World blackbirds, and New World orioles. Most species have black as the predominant plumage colour, often enlivened by yellow, orange, or red.

Common name	Binomial	Irish name	Status
Bobolink	Dolichonyx oryzivorus	Bobóilinc	A R
Baltimore oriole	Icterus galbula	Óiréal tuaisceartach	A R

== New World warblers ==
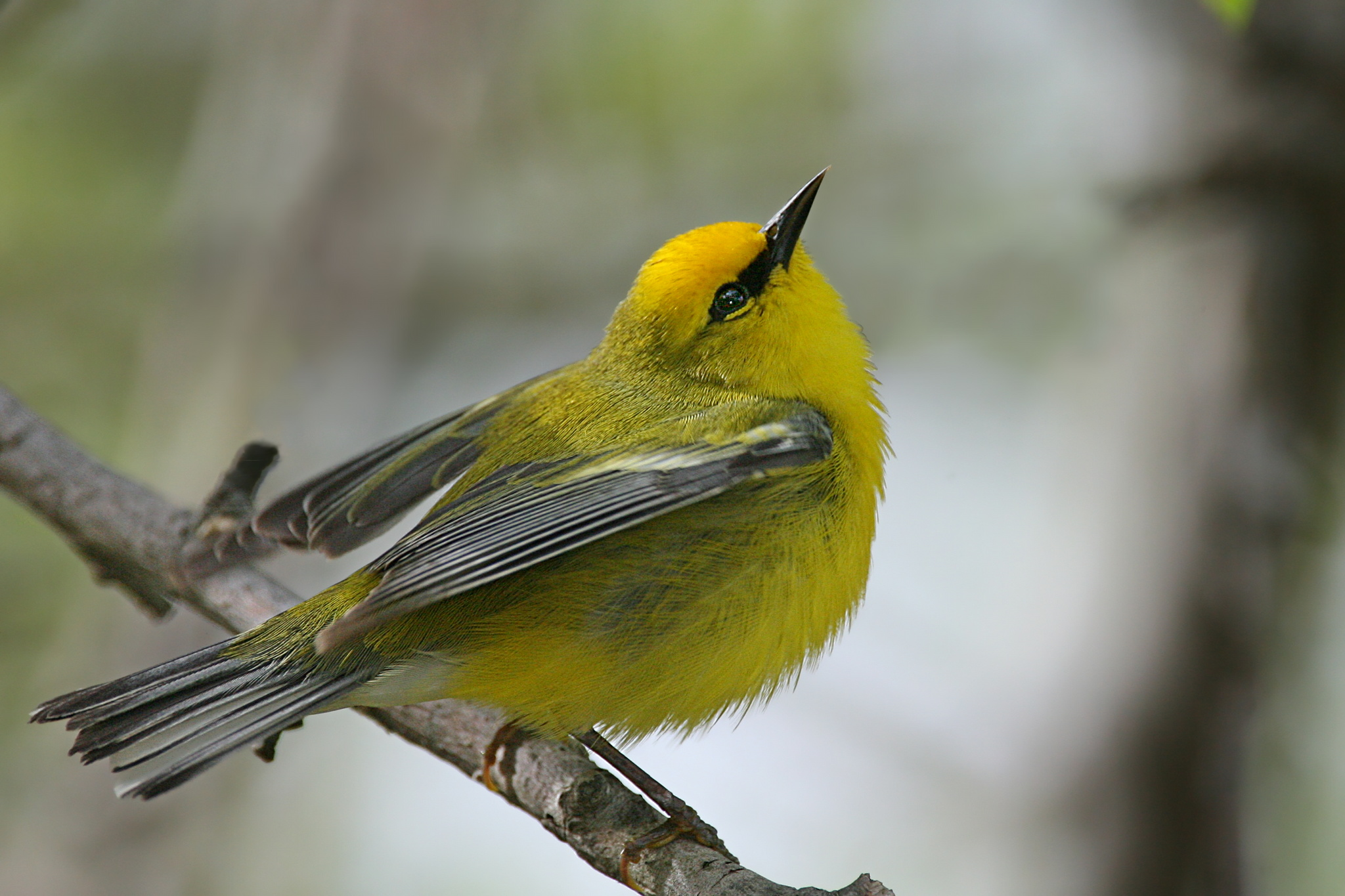
Blue-winged warbler, one on Cape Clear Island in 2000 was the first European record of this North American bird.

Order: Passeriformes Family: Parulidae

The New World warblers are a group of small, often colourful, passerine birds restricted to the New World. Most are arboreal, but some are terrestrial. Most members of this family are insectivores.

Common name	Binomial	Irish name	Status
Ovenbird	Seiurus aurocapilla	Éan oighinn	A R
Northern waterthrush	Parkesia noveboracensis	Smólach uisce tuaisceartach	A R
Blue-winged warbler	Vermivora cyanoptera	Ceolaire gormeiteach	A R
Black-and-white warbler	Mniotilta varia	Ceolaire dubh is bán	A R
Common yellowthroat	Geothlypis trichas	Buíphíb choiteann	A R
American redstart	Setophaga ruticilla	Earrdheargán Meiriceánach	A R
Northern parula	Setophaga americana	Parúl tuaisceartach	A R
American yellow warbler	Setophaga aestiva	Ceolaire buí Meiriceánach	A R
Blackpoll warbler	Setophaga striata	Ceolaire dubhéadanach	A R
Myrtle warbler	Setophaga coronata	Ceolaire buíphrompach	A R
Canada warbler	Cardellina canadensis	Ceolaire Ceanadach	A R
Wilson's warbler	Cardellina pusilla	Ceolaire Wilson	A R

== Cardinals and allies ==
Order: Passeriformes Family: Cardinalidae

The cardinals are a family of robust, seed-eating birds with strong bills. They are typically associated with open woodland. The sexes usually have distinct plumages.

Common name	Binomial	Irish name	Status
Scarlet tanager	Piranga olivacea	Tanagair scarlóideach	A R
Rose-breasted grosbeak	Pheucticus ludovicianus	Gobach mór broinnrósach	A R
Indigo bunting	Passerina cyanea	Gealóg phlúiríneach	A R

== See also ==
- List of birds
- Lists of birds by region
