= Firecrest =

Firecrest can refer to:

== Birds ==
- Common firecrest (often called firecrest), Regulus ignicapillus, found in Europe and north Africa
- Madeira firecrest, Regulus madeirensis, found on the island of Madeira
- Taiwan firecrest (also known as flamecrest), Regulus goodfellowi, found in Taiwan

== Ships and boats ==
- USS Firecrest, a ship name used more than once by the U.S. Navy
- Firecrest, was a 12-ton racing cruiser in which Alain Gerbault circumnavigated the globe from 1923 to 1929

== Aircraft ==
- Blackburn Firecrest, was a single-engine naval strike fighter aeroplane built by Blackburn Aircraft

== Other ==
- Firecrest (novel), a 1971 thriller novel by Victor Canning
