= Regulus bulgaricus =

Scientific classification
- Kingdom: Animalia
- Phylum: Chordata
- Class: Aves
- Order: Passeriformes
- Family: Regulidae
- Genus: Regulus
- Species: †R. bulgaricus

Binomial name
- †Regulus bulgaricus Boev, 1999

Extinct species of bird

Regulus bulgaricus is a fossil passerine from the Middle Villafranchian (upper Pliocene to lower Pleistocene ) of Bulgaria. This bird is a member of the kinglet family and genus, and is the only fossil kinglet found so far. It is known from a single ulna, which is 13.3 mm long. The fossil was discovered in 1991 near Varshets, Bulgaria, and described by Zlatozar Boev.

== Taxonomy ==
The only known specimen of Regulus bulgaricus is a complete left ulna, 13.3 mm in length. It was collected on 20 September 1991 in a ponor near Varshets, Bulgaria. It was first described by its collector, the Bulgarian paleornithologist Zlatozar Boev. Its species name, bulgaricus, was given after the country in which the fossil was found. Boev diagnosed it as an extinct species of the genus Regulus. The ulna is smaller than that of most passerines, and the shape of the articular surfaces identify it as a kinglet. It is distinguished from R. regulus by a thicker base, a longer olecranon, a larger cotyla dorsalis, and smaller quill knobs (papillae remigales caudales). Compared to R. ignicapilla, R. bulgaricus has a narrower proximal part of the diaphysis, a shorter olecranon, and smaller tuberculum retinaculi. Although Boev was unable to compare the fossil ulna with R. goodfellowi, it can be excluded from this taxonomical comparison due to it sharing a superspecies with R. regulus.

Regulus bulgaricus is the only fossil kinglet, and is possibly the ancestor of R. ignicapillus. This was speculated based on the postglacial origin of a coniferous forest belt in the Holarctic, which means that its avifauna is of a more recent origin.

== Literature cited ==
- Boev, Zlatozar (1999). "Regulas bulgaricus sp. n.-the first fossil Kinglet (Aves: Sylviidae) from the Late Pliocene of Varshets, Western Bulgaria". Historia Naturalis Bulgarica. 10. Bulgarian Academy of Sciences: 109–115.
- Boev, Zlatozar (2002). "Neogene avifauna of Bulgaria" (PDF). Proceedings of the 5th Symposium of the Society of Avian Palaeontology and Evolution. Science Press, Beijing: 29–40.
