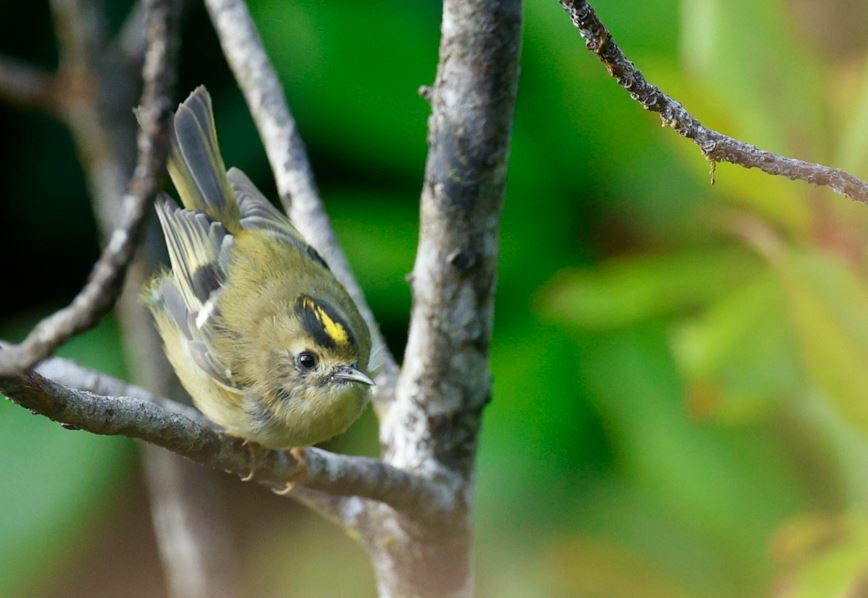

Scientific classification
- Kingdom: Animalia
- Phylum: Chordata
- Class: Aves
- Order: Passeriformes
- Family: Regulidae
- Genus: Regulus
- Species: R. regulus
- Subspecies: R. r. azoricus

Trinomial name
- Regulus regulus azoricus Seebohm, 1883

= São Miguel goldcrest =

Subspecies of bird

The São Miguel goldcrest (Regulus regulus azoricus), Estrelinha-de-poupa in Portuguese, is a subspecies of the goldcrest. One of several goldcrest insular subspecies in the North Atlantic archipelagos of Macaronesia, it is endemic to São Miguel in the Azores where it is a non-migratory resident.
