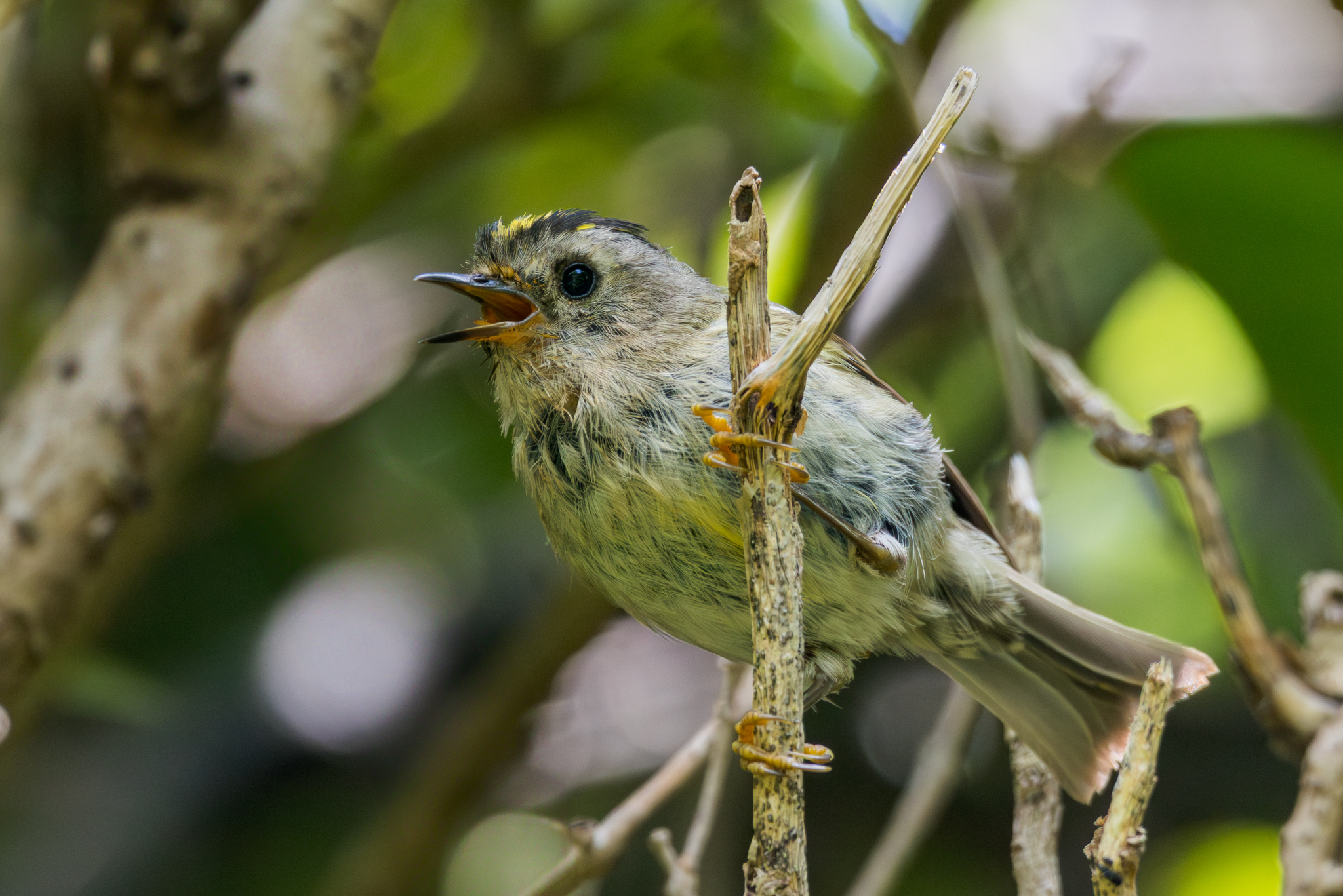

Scientific classification
- Kingdom: Animalia
- Phylum: Chordata
- Class: Aves
- Order: Passeriformes
- Family: Regulidae
- Genus: Regulus
- Species: R. regulus
- Subspecies: R. r. inermis

Trinomial name
- Regulus regulus inermis Murphy & Chapin, 1929

= Western Azores goldcrest =

Subspecies of bird

The Western Azores goldcrest (Regulus regulus inermis), Estrelinha-de-poupa in Portuguese, is a subspecies of the goldcrest. It is endemic to the Azores archipelago, in the North Atlantic Ocean, where it is a non-migratory resident of the islands of Flores, Faial, Terceira, São Jorge and Pico.

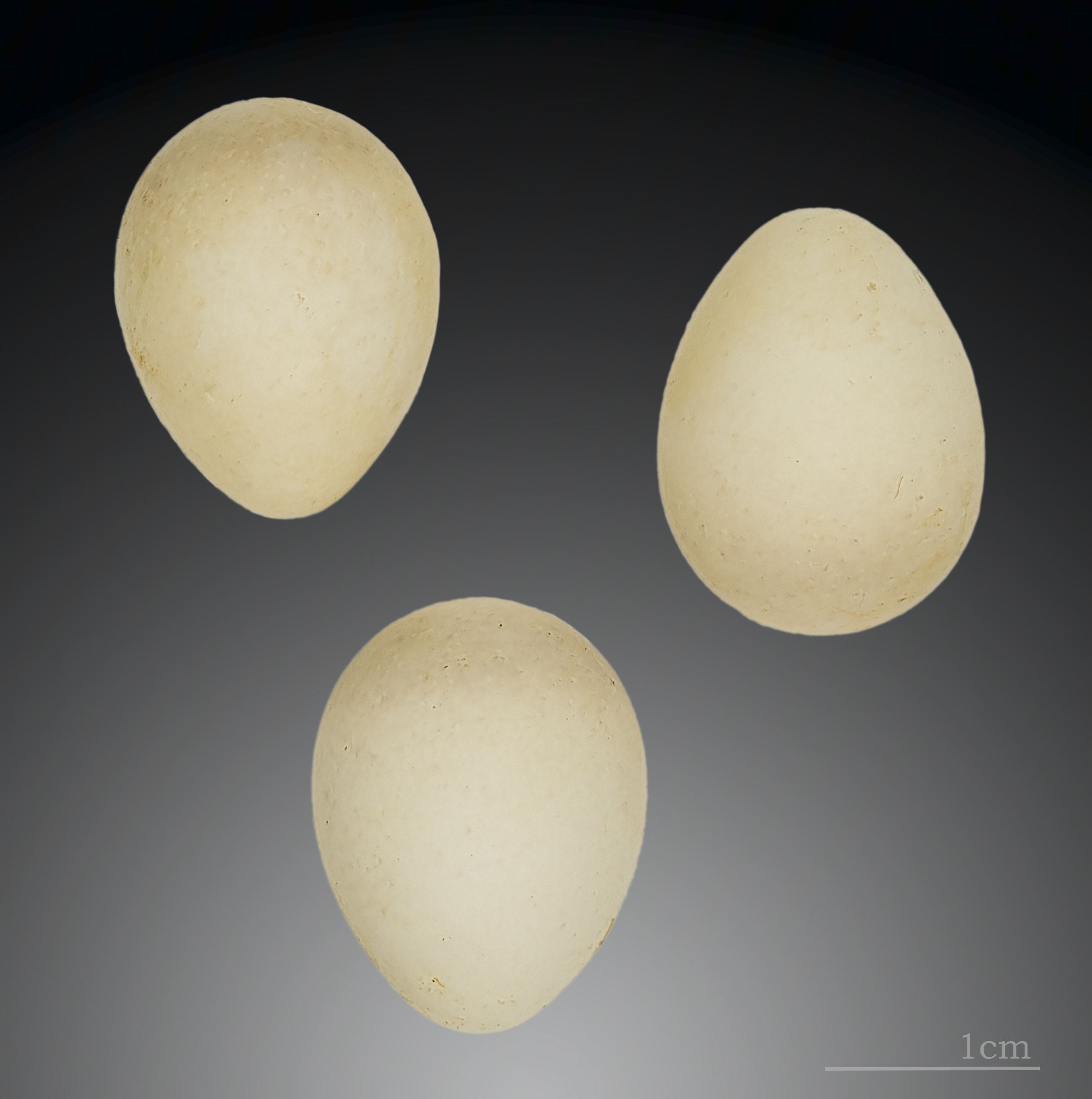
Eggs of the Western Azores goldcrest
