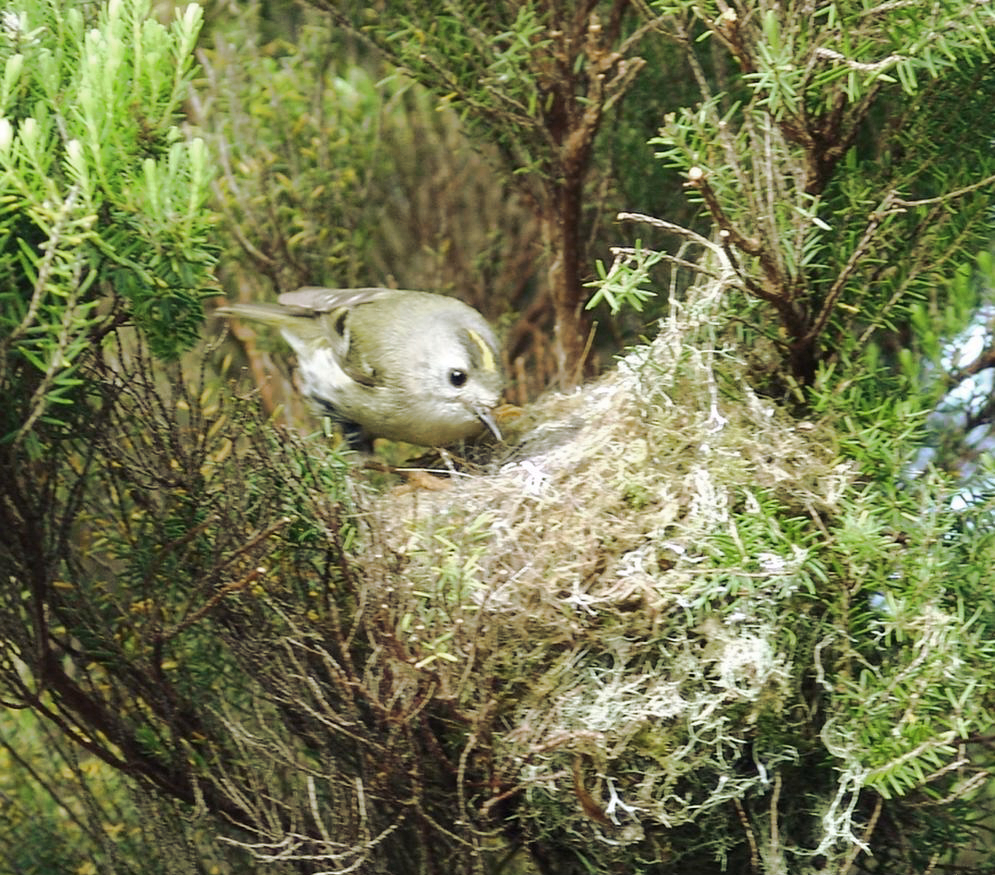

Scientific classification
- Kingdom: Animalia
- Phylum: Chordata
- Class: Aves
- Order: Passeriformes
- Family: Regulidae
- Genus: Regulus
- Species: R. regulus
- Subspecies: R. r. sanctaemariae

Trinomial name
- Regulus regulus sanctaemariae Vaurie, 1954

= Santa Maria goldcrest =

Subspecies of bird

The Santa Maria goldcrest (Regulus regulus sanctaemariae) Estrelinha-de-poupa in Portuguese, is a subspecies of the goldcrest. It is endemic to Santa Maria Island in the Azores archipelago in the North Atlantic Ocean where it is a non-migratory resident.
