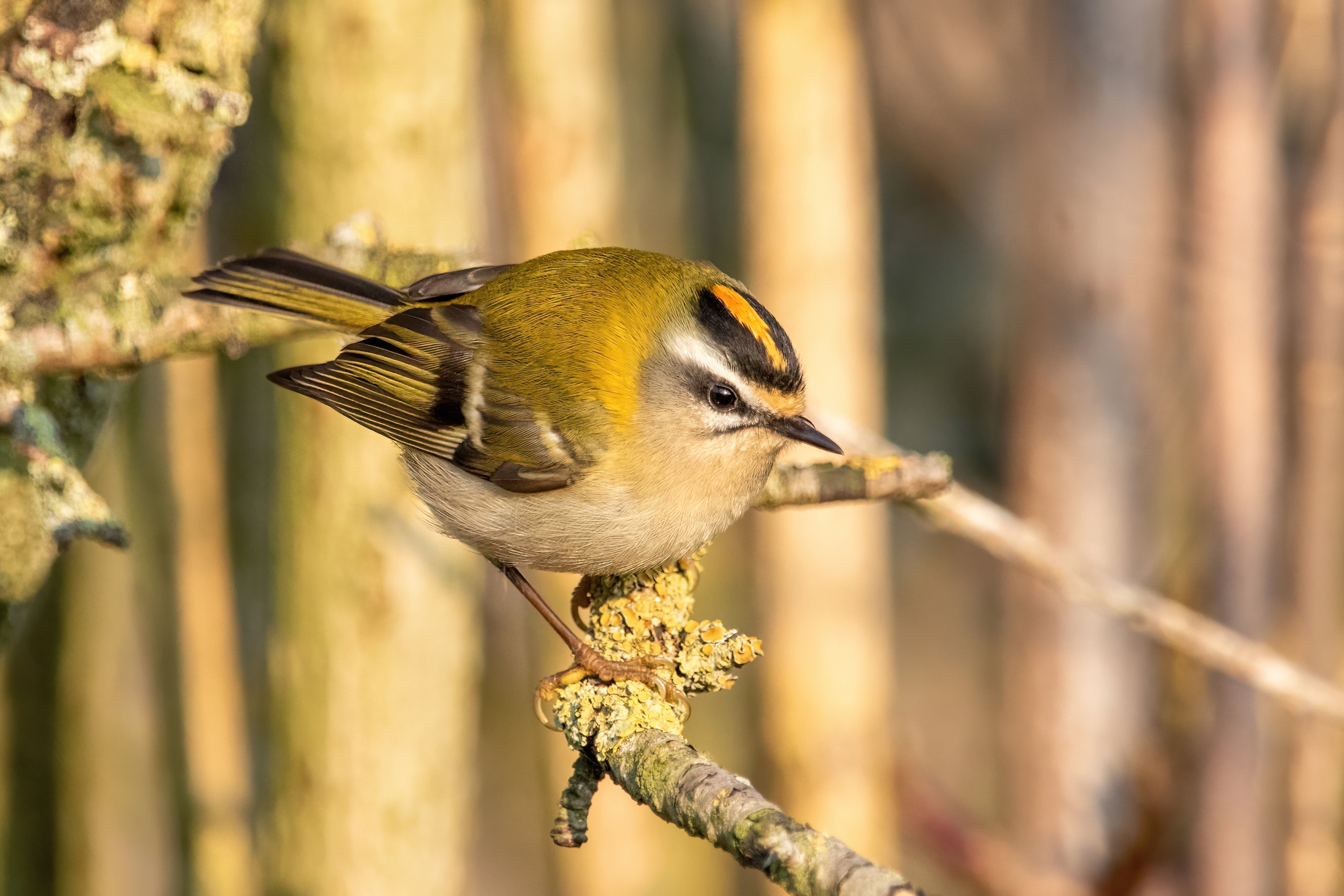
- Male of nominate subspecies in France

Conservation status
- Least Concern (IUCN 3.1)

Scientific classification
- Kingdom: Animalia
- Phylum: Chordata
- Class: Aves
- Order: Passeriformes
- Family: Regulidae
- Genus: Regulus
- Species: R. ignicapilla

Binomial name
- Regulus ignicapilla (Temminck, 1820)
- Range of R. ignicapilla Breeding Resident Non-breeding

Synonyms
- Regulus ignicapillus

= Common firecrest =

Very small passerine bird from Europe and northwest Africa

The common firecrest (Regulus ignicapilla), also known as the firecrest, is a very small passerine bird in the kinglet family. It breeds in most of temperate Europe and northwestern Africa, and is partially migratory, with birds from central Europe wintering to the south and west of their breeding range. Firecrests in the Balearic Islands and north Africa are widely recognised as a separate subspecies, but the population on Madeira, previously also treated as a subspecies, is now treated as a distinct species, the Madeira firecrest, Regulus madeirensis. A fossil ancestor of the firecrest has been identified from a single wing bone.

This kinglet is greenish above and has whitish underparts. It has two white wingbars, a black eye stripe and a white supercilium. The head crest, orange in the male and yellow in the female, is displayed during breeding, and gives rise to the English and scientific names for the species. This bird superficially resembles the goldcrest, which largely shares its European range, but the firecrest's bronze shoulders and strong face pattern are distinctive. The song is a repetition of high thin notes, slightly lower-pitched than those of its relative.

The common firecrest breeds in broadleaved or coniferous woodland and gardens, building its compact, three-layered nest on a tree branch. Seven to twelve eggs are incubated by the female alone. Both parents feed the chicks, which fledge 22–24 days after hatching. This kinglet is constantly on the move and frequently hovers as it searches for insects to eat, and in winter it is often found with flocks of tits. Despite some possible local declines, the species is not the subject of significant conservation concerns owing to its large European population and an expansion of its range over the last century. It may be hunted and killed by birds of prey, and can carry parasites. It is possible that this species was the original "king of the birds" in European folklore.

== Description ==
The common firecrest is a small plump bird, 9 cm (3.5 in) in length with a wingspan of 13–16 cm (5.1–6.3 in), and weighs 4–7 grams (0.14–0.25 oz). It has bright olive-green upperparts with a bronze-coloured patch on each shoulder, and whitish underparts washed with brownish-grey on the breast and flanks. It has two white wingbars, a tiny black pointed bill, and brownish-black legs. The head pattern is striking, with a black eye stripe, long white supercilium, and a crest which is bright yellow in the female and mainly orange in the male. The sexes are very similar, apart from the crest colour, although the female is a little duller in plumage and on average slightly smaller. Juveniles have a grey tinge to the duller upperparts, and lack the coloured crown; the other head markings are present, but duller than in the adult. By their first winter, only the flight and tail feathers remain unmoulted, and the young birds are virtually indistinguishable from the adults in the field. This kinglet usually hops with its body held horizontally, and its flight is weak and whirring, with occasional quick evasive turns.

Adult firecrests are unlikely to be confused with any other species; Pallas's warbler has a similar head and wing pattern, but its crown stripe is pale lemon, not bright yellow or orange, and its supercilium is also pale yellow, not bright white. The juvenile common firecrest might be confused with the goldcrest, but usually shows enough face pattern to distinguish it from its relative, which has a very plain face at all ages. The firecrest can also be separated from Pallas's warbler by the warbler's pale crown stripe and yellow rump. There is more likelihood of confusing the juvenile firecrest with the yellow-browed warbler, which has a similar head pattern; the warbler (an Asiatic species) has pale fringes to the feathers of the closed wing, a whitish belly and darker brown legs. The yellow-browed warbler also lacks the pale half circle present below the young firecrest's eye.

== Taxonomy and systematics ==
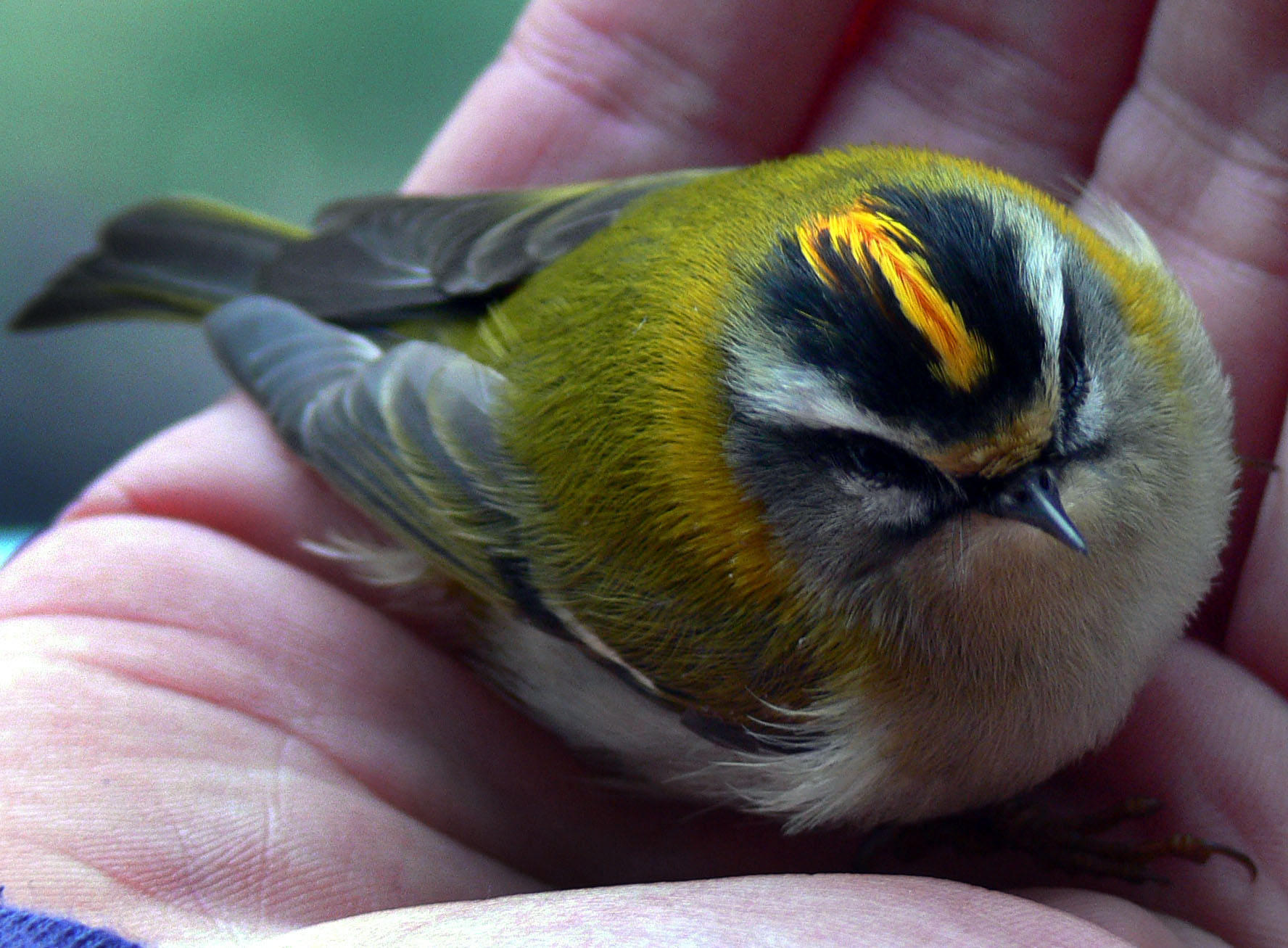
A temporarily stunned adult male found on a pavement in Lille, France. The pattern on its head is seen clearly.

The kinglets are a small group of birds sometimes included in the Old World warblers, but frequently given family status, especially as recent research shows that, despite superficial similarities, the crests are phylogenetically remote from the warblers. The names of the family Regulidae, and the genus Regulus, are derived from the Latin regulus, a diminutive of rex, "a king", and refer to the characteristic orange or yellow crests of adult kinglets. The common firecrest was first formally described by Dutch zoologist Coenraad Jacob Temminck in 1820 as Sylvia ignicapilla; the relatively late identification of this common European bird arose from a perception that it was just a variety of the goldcrest. The species name is derived from Latin ignis "fire" and capillus "hair". The binomial is frequently given as R. ignicapillus due to a misunderstanding of Latin grammar.

There are two widely recognised subspecies of common firecrest, nominate R. i. ignicapilla and Mediterranean R. i. balearicus (Jordans, 1923). The latter form is found on the Balearic Islands and in north Africa, and is slightly paler below and greyer above than the nominate subspecies. Other subspecies have been claimed, including southeastern R. i. caucasicus, North African R. i. laeneni, and Crimean R. i. tauricus. The Madeira firecrest, R. madeirensis, was formerly also considered to be a subspecies of the common firecrest, but phylogenetic analysis based on the cytochrome b gene showed that the Madeiran form is distinct at the species level. Cytochrome b gene divergence between the Madeira firecrest and the European bird is 8.5%, comparable with the divergence level between other recognised Regulus species, such as the 9% between the goldcrest and the golden-crowned kinglet. The island form also differs in morphology and vocalisations. The proposed split was accepted by the Association of European Rarities Committees (AERC) in 2003, with most other authorities also splitting it later on.

The flamecrest or Taiwan firecrest (Regulus goodfellowi) of Taiwan has sometimes been viewed as a race of the common firecrest; however, the flamecrest's territorial song, which resembles those of the Himalayan races of the goldcrest, and genetic data indicate that the flamecrest is closely related to the Himalayan goldcrest and only distantly to the two firecrest species. The kinglets on the Canary Islands, which were also considered to be close to firecrests, have now been shown to comprise two subspecies of goldcrest.

=== Fossils ===
There are a few Pleistocene (2.6 million to 12,000 years ago) records from Europe and Israel of extant Regulus species, mostly goldcrests or unidentifiable to species, but also a Spanish specimen of firecrest. A left ulna from Bulgaria was identified as belonging to a fossil species, Regulus bulgaricus, from 2.6–1.95 mya. This appears to be ancestral to the common firecrest, with the goldcrest diverging from this lineage in the Middle Pleistocene.

== Distribution and habitat ==
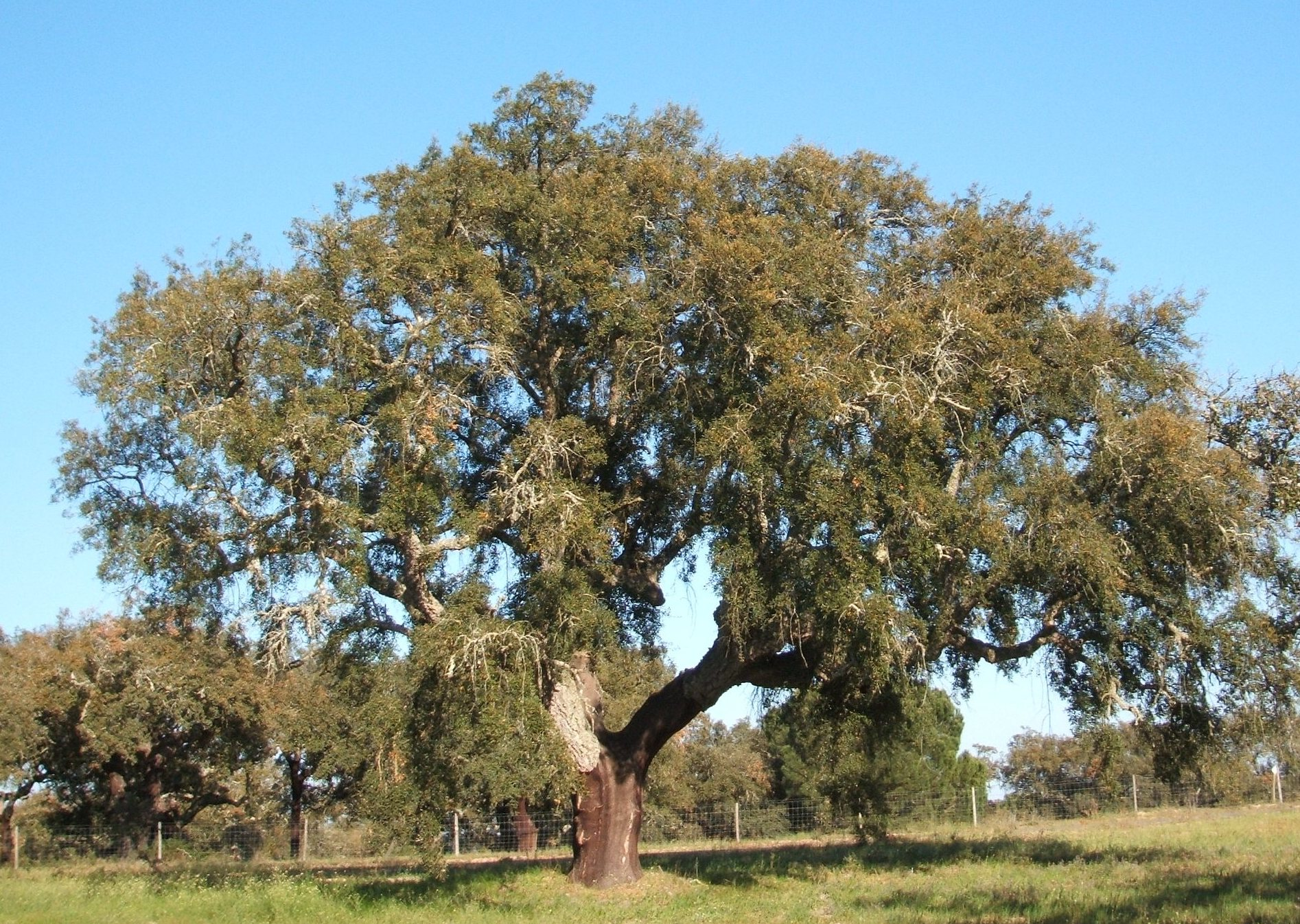
Cork woodland is favoured for breeding.

The common firecrest breeds in lowland broadleaf forest, preferring cork oak and alder where available, otherwise beech and holly. It also uses mixed broadleaf and conifer woodland, and stands of spruce, European silver fir, cedar and pines, often with undergrowth of juniper, ivy and wild rose. In drier Mediterranean habitats it is found in conifers, evergreen oak, and mixed woodlands up to 2,800 m (9,200 ft). Unlike more specialised birds such as Eurasian nuthatch and common treecreeper, both of which forage on trunks, the crests do not need large woodlands, and their population density is independent of forest size. In winter it is less reliant on conifers than the goldcrest, moving from forest to fringes and scrub. It occurs singly or in pairs, spending much time in the tree canopy, although frequently venturing into bushes and other lower vegetation. This species can thrive in fairly urban areas, provided that suitable habitat is available in parks or large gardens; population densities in gardens can be comparable with the maximum levels found in natural habitats.

The nominate subspecies breeds in Europe from southern England, France, Spain and Portugal east to Belarus, northwestern Ukraine, and Greece, and north to the Baltic and southern Latvia. There are isolated populations east of the main range in Abkhazia, the Crimea and Turkey. Its range lies between the 16 and 24 °C (61 and 75 °F) July isotherms. Southern birds are largely resident, unlike northern and eastern populations which are migratory, wintering mainly in Mediterranean areas and the far west of Europe from Portugal north to Britain. R. i. balearicus is resident in the Balearic Islands and the northern parts of Morocco, Algeria and Tunisia. This species has been recorded as a vagrant from Norway, Finland, Estonia, Cyprus, Egypt and Lebanon. In July 2020, it was reported that the common firecrest was now nesting in at least two locations in southern Finland.

== Behaviour and ecology ==
=== Breeding ===
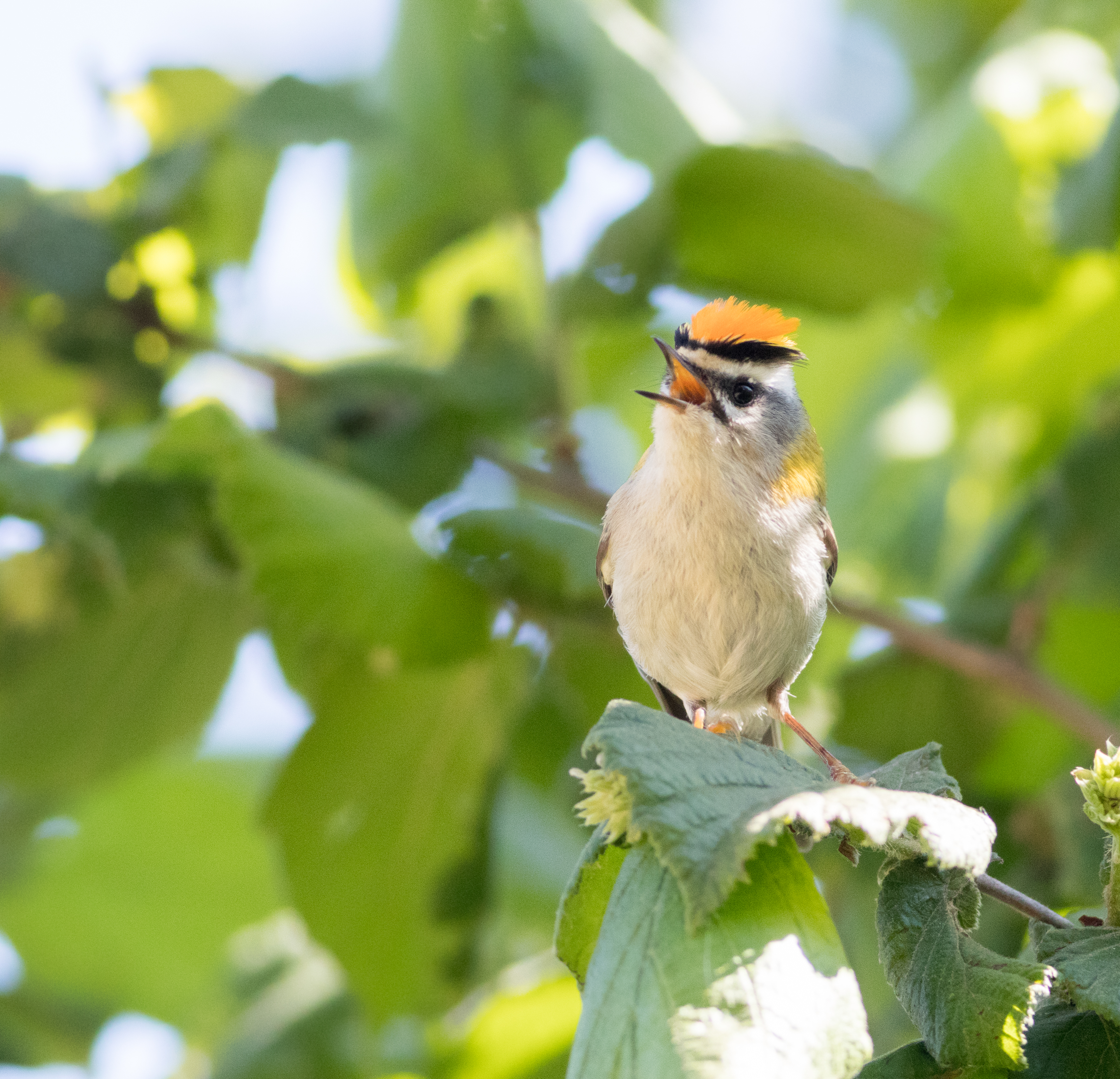
Singing with crest displayed in a hazelnut tree. Capranica, Italy.

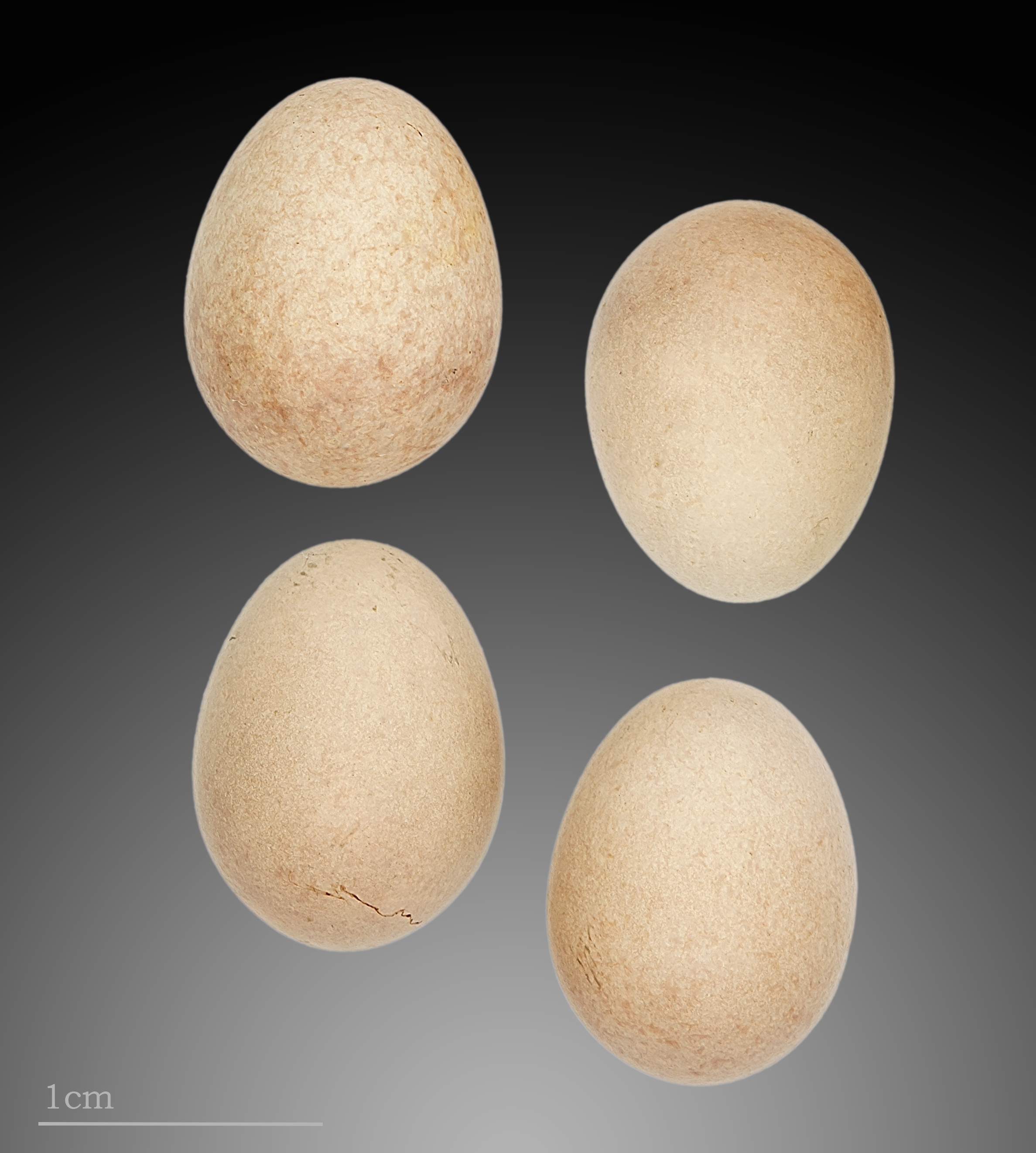
Eggs of Regulus ignicapilla – MHNT

The common firecrest is monogamous. The male sings during the breeding season, often with its crest raised, and has a display which involves pointing its bill at another bird, showing the crest and strong face pattern. This differs from the display of the plainer-faced goldcrest, which bows its head to emphasise the crest. The breeding territory is about 0.5 hectares (1.2 acres), and may overlap with neighbouring goldcrest territories. Firecrests will sometimes defend their territories against goldcrests with the crest raised and a great deal of wing-fluttering, but the amount of actual competition between the species may not be very great. A Spanish study suggested that territorial conflicts between the species, and other phenomena like males singing mixed or alternating songs, were most frequent when one species locally far outnumbered the other; in other circumstances, the two kinglets learned to ignore each other's songs. In his courtship display the male firecrest raises his crest, points it towards his mate and hovers over her before mating takes place.

The nest is often suspended from a hanging branch usually at no great altitude, although Eric Simms reported nests at heights from 2.5 to 20 m (8.2 to 65.6 ft). Firecrests may favour breeding close to Eurasian goshawk nests. That large bird will prey on potential predators of the firecrest such as Eurasian sparrowhawks, and nest robbers like grey squirrels, Eurasian jays and great spotted woodpeckers. As is typical for the family, the nest is a closed cup built in three layers with a small entrance hole near its top. The nest's outer layer is made from moss, small twigs, cobwebs and lichen, the spider webs also being used to attach the nest to the thin branches that support it. The middle layer is moss, and this is lined with feathers (up to 3,000) and hair. The nest is smaller, deeper and more compact than that of the goldcrest, about 8 cm (3.1 in) across and 5–7 cm (2.0–2.8 in) deep, with a wall thickness of about 2 cm (0.79 in). The nest is constructed by the female alone, although the male will accompany the female while she builds the nest over a period of a few days to three weeks.

Laying starts in western Europe at the end of April, and in the east of the range in late May; second clutches, which are common, commence in June to July. The eggs are pink with very indistinct reddish markings at the broad end, unlike those of Madeira firecrest which are described as like those of a Phylloscopus warbler (white with some brown speckles). The eggs are 14 mm × 10 mm (0.55 in × 0.39 in) and weigh 0.7 g (0.025 oz), of which 5% is shell. The clutch size in Europe is 7–12 eggs, but probably smaller in northwest Africa. The female incubates the eggs for 14.5 to 16.5 days to hatching, and broods the chicks, which fledge eight to ten days later. Both parents feed the chicks and fledged young. This species becomes sexually mature after one year, and has a life expectancy of less than two years.

Although their ranges overlap substantially, hybridisation between goldcrests and firecrests seems to be prevented by differences in courtship rituals and different facial patterns. Even in aviary studies in which a female goldcrest was given an artificial eyestripe to facilitate mating with a male firecrest, the chicks were never raised by the mixed pair, and appeared to be poorly adapted compared to the parent species.

=== Feeding ===
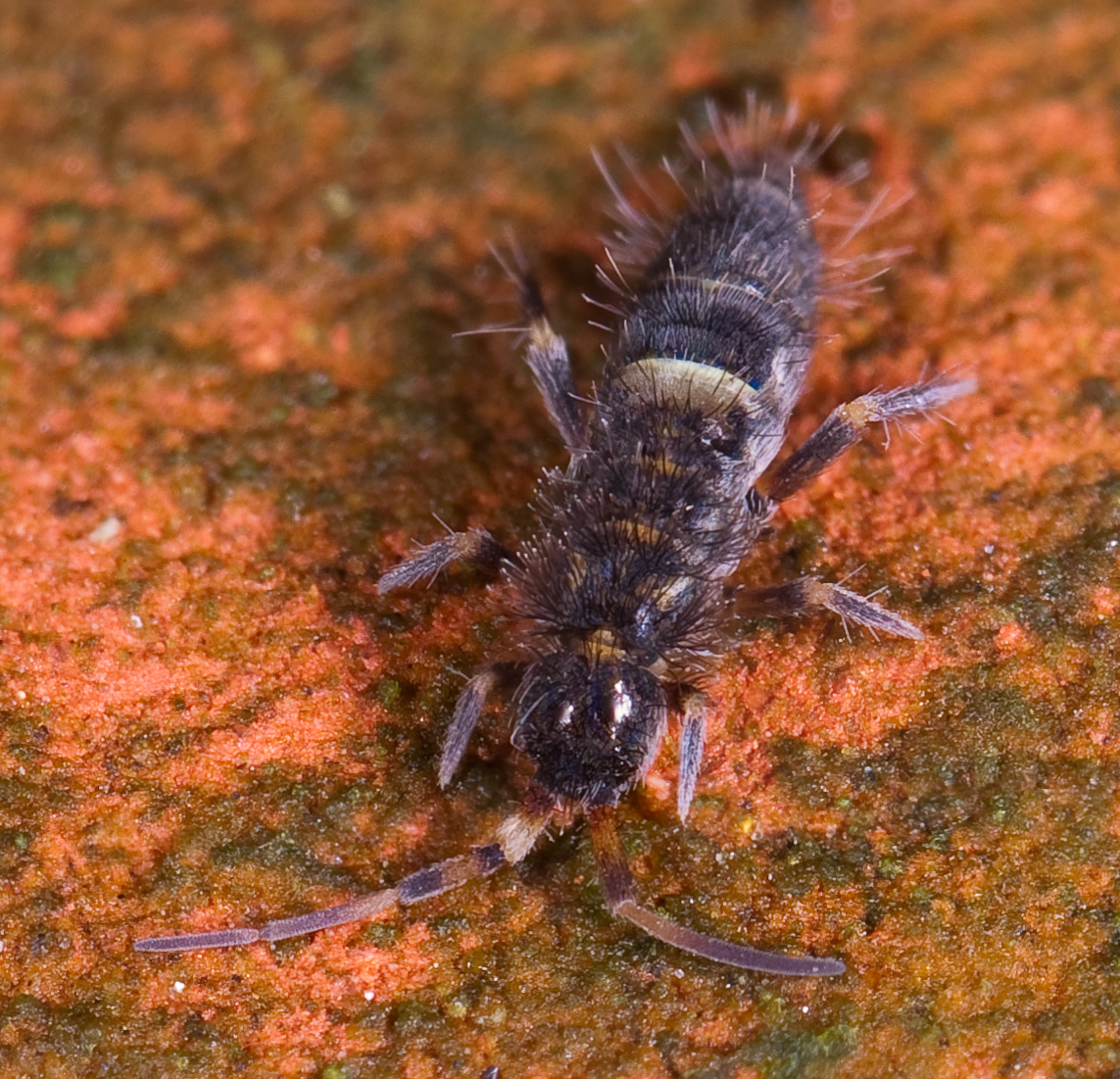
Firecrest parents mainly feed young chicks during their first four days of life with springtails (average length 4 mm) after which time larger food items are given as the chicks grow.

All species of kinglet are almost exclusively insectivorous, preying on small arthropods with soft cuticles, such as springtails, aphids and spiders. They also feed on the cocoons and eggs of spiders and insects, and occasionally take pollen. All species will hover to catch flying insects. Although the similarly sized firecrest and goldcrest are often found together, there are a number of factors that reduce direct competition for food. Common firecrests prefer larger prey than goldcrests. Although both will take trapped insects from spider webs on autumn migration, firecrests will also eat the large orb-web spiders (on rare occasions kinglets have been found stuck in a spider web, either unable to move or dead).

The common firecrest feeds in trees, exploiting mainly the upper surface of branches in coniferous habitat and of leaves in deciduous trees. This is in contrast to the goldcrest, which frequently feeds on the undersides of branches and leaves. In winter, flocks of common firecrests cover a given distance about three times faster than do goldcrests, and ignore the smallest prey items preferred by their relative; large invertebrates are killed by beating them repeatedly against a branch. The differences in behaviour are facilitated by subtle morphological differences; firecrests have broader bills with longer rictal bristles (which protect a bird's eye from food items it is trying to capture), and these features reflect the larger prey taken by the species. The firecrest's less forked tail may reflect its longer episodes of hovering while hunting. Firecrests forage more often while standing, and have a foot better adapted for perching, whereas the goldcrest's longer hind toe reflects its habit of moving vertically along branches while feeding. It also has a deep grooves in the soles of its feet capable of gripping individual needles, while firecrests have a smoother underside to the foot.

Young common firecrests are fed almost exclusively with springtails; larger food items are not accepted, and spiders are occasionally regurgitated. From the fifth day onwards, the nestling diet includes aphids and a high amount of snail shells, the latter being needed for bone growth. After the second week, the food includes larger moths and caterpillars, as well as various arthropods typically avoided by adults, such as harvestmen, earwigs, and centipedes.

In winter, the firecrest joins loose flocks of other wanderers such as tits and warblers. This kinglet, like other species that prefer mixed-species foraging flocks in winter, hunts over a greater range of heights and vegetation types than when feeding alone. For species that tend to feed in flocks, foraging success while in a flock was about twice that for solitary birds. In some areas, wintering birds have developed the habit of coming to feeding stations and bird tables for fatty food, sometimes with goldcrests or warblers such as the common chiffchaff and blackcap. The kinglet's digestive system is adapted to an entirely insectivorous diet, whereas Sylvia warblers include fruit in their autumn diet. A Spanish study compared that genus with the insectivorous firecrest and Phylloscopus warblers. The results showed that, relative to body weight, the insect-eaters had shorter intestines, but longer gut passage times than the Sylvia species. The insect-eaters are also generally slightly smaller than the omnivores.

=== Voice ===
The contact call is three or four thin high notes, similar to that of goldcrest, but slightly lower in pitch, zit-zit-zit rather than see-see-see. The song is a succession of call notes in a longer and slightly more varied sequence. Typically there are 11–14 notes per song, becoming louder and faster, with the final three notes slightly different from the preceding ones: zit-zit-zit-zit-zit-zit-zit-zit-zit-zit-zirt.zirt.zirt. The song usually lasts 0.5–2.5 seconds, shorter than the 3.5–4.0 seconds for the goldcrest, and may be repeated up to eight times a minute. In May and June, singing is most frequent after dawn, but continues less often throughout the day. Later in the breeding season, song becomes largely confined to the morning.

The song of the Mediterranean subspecies of common firecrest, R. i. balearicus, is very similar to that of the nominate form, but one factor in separating the Madeiran firecrest from common firecrest is that the island bird's song is divided into three phrases, two of them consisting of modified display and anger calls. Its display calls also use a larger frequency range and more harmonics than those of the continental subspecies. Male goldcrests and Madeiran firecrests sometimes show a territorial response to recordings of the songs or calls of the common firecrest, but the reverse is apparently not true, because the songs of the common firecrest are simpler in construction than those of its relatives.

=== Predators and parasites ===
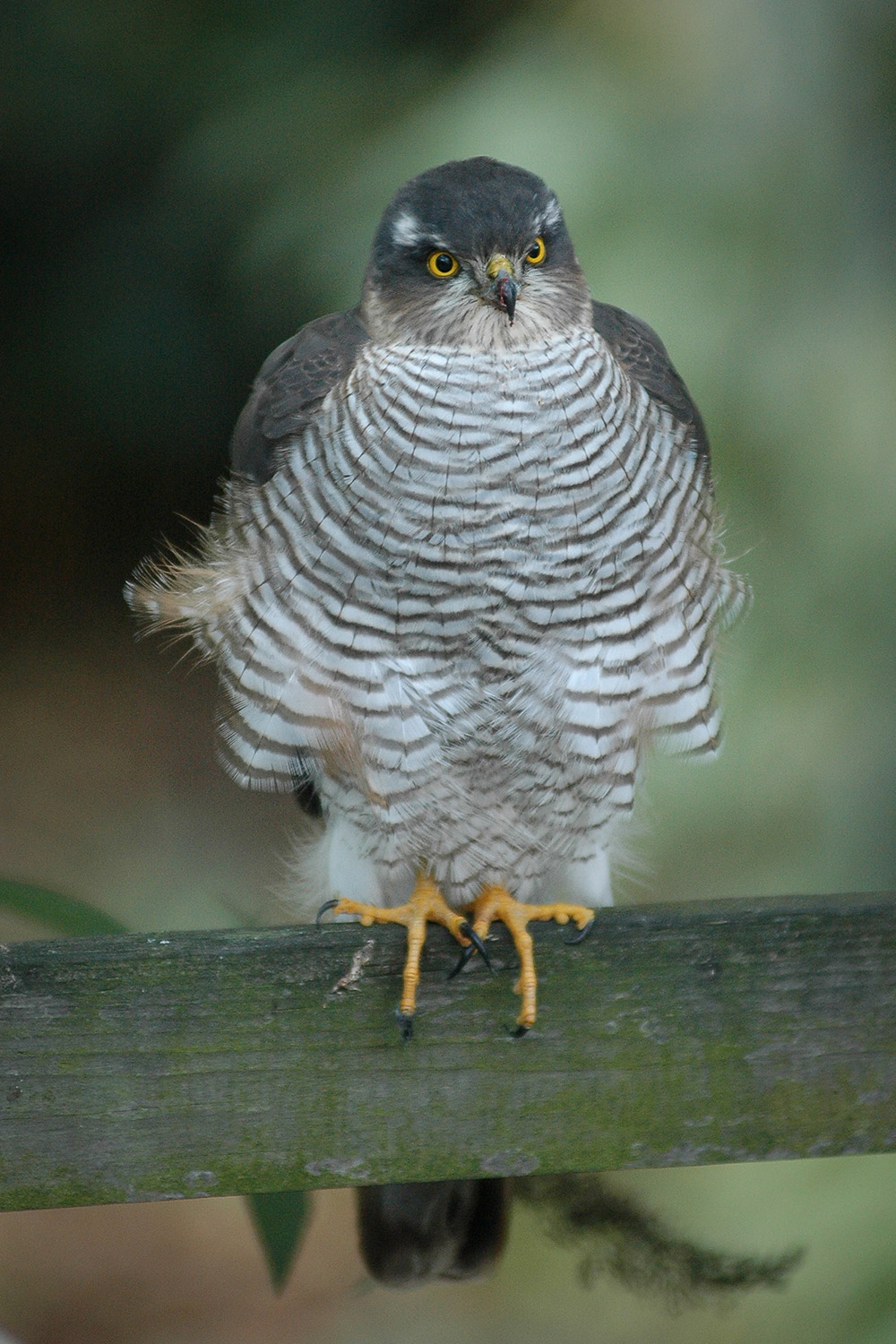
The Eurasian sparrowhawk is a major predator of small songbirds.

Throughout the firecrest's range, the main predator of small woodland birds is the Eurasian sparrowhawk, which takes avian prey as up to 98% of its diet. The tawny owl relies more on mammalian catches, but about one-third of its food is forest birds. Eggs and young may be taken by grey squirrels, Eurasian jays and great spotted woodpeckers. The firecrest appears to be virtually unknown as a host of the common cuckoo, a widespread European brood parasite.

The invasive Argentine ant (Linepithema humile) is common in the Mediterranean area, and reduces arthropod numbers by removing most native ant species. The reduction in prey items is greatest in the tree canopy, and has a greater effect on species like the firecrest that feed high in the foliage. Less food is available for chicks, and parents have to spend more time foraging.

Data on specific parasites of the firecrest is lacking, but the widespread moorhen flea, Dasypsyllus gallinulae has been recorded in a related Regulus species. A number of feather mites have been recorded in the genus, including Proctophyllodes glandarinus on firecrest. These mites live on fungi growing on the feathers. The fungi found on the plumage may feed on the keratin of the outer feathers or on feather oil.

== Status ==
The common firecrest expanded its range in the nineteenth and twentieth centuries, colonising northern France, followed by first breeding in the Netherlands in 1928 and Denmark in 1961. In Britain, it had only been recorded a handful of times by 1839, but first bred in 1962, and is now widespread as a breeding bird in much of southern England. Milder winters have meant that more birds can winter further north, and therefore the breeding range can expand without incurring the risks involved in lengthy migrations. A population was found in northern Morocco in 1986.

Population growth may be limited by lack of suitable habitat, and there may be local declines due to loss of conifers through storms or replacement by plantations of native deciduous trees. There may also be localised losses in areas of high heavy metal pollution, which particularly affects ground feeders like thrushes and conifer foliage gleaners, including both European Regulus species. Conifer specialists suffer from the loss and poor quality of needles, and the consequent decrease in abundance of their invertebrate food. The common firecrest has a large range and a population estimated at 10–15 million individuals, most in Europe. The population is believed to be stable in the absence of evidence for any declines or serious threats, and it is therefore classed as least concern on the IUCN Red List.

== In culture ==
Aristotle and Pliny relate the legend of a contest amongst the birds to see who should be their king, the title to be awarded to the one that could fly highest. Initially, it looked as though the eagle would win easily, but as he began to tire, a small bird which had hidden under the eagle's tail feathers emerged to fly even higher and claimed the title. Following from this legend, in much European folklore the wren has been described as the "king of the birds" or as a flame bearer. However, these terms were also applied to the Regulus species, the fiery crowns of the goldcrest and firecrest making them more likely to be the original bearers of these titles, and, because of the legend's reference to the "smallest of birds" becoming king, the title was probably transferred to the equally tiny wren. The confusion was assisted by the similarity and consequent interchangeability of the Ancient Greek words for the wren (βασιλεύς basileus, "king") and the crest (βασιλισκος basiliskos, "kinglet"). In English, the association between the firecrest and Eurasian wren was reinforced by the kinglet's old name of "fire-crested wren".
