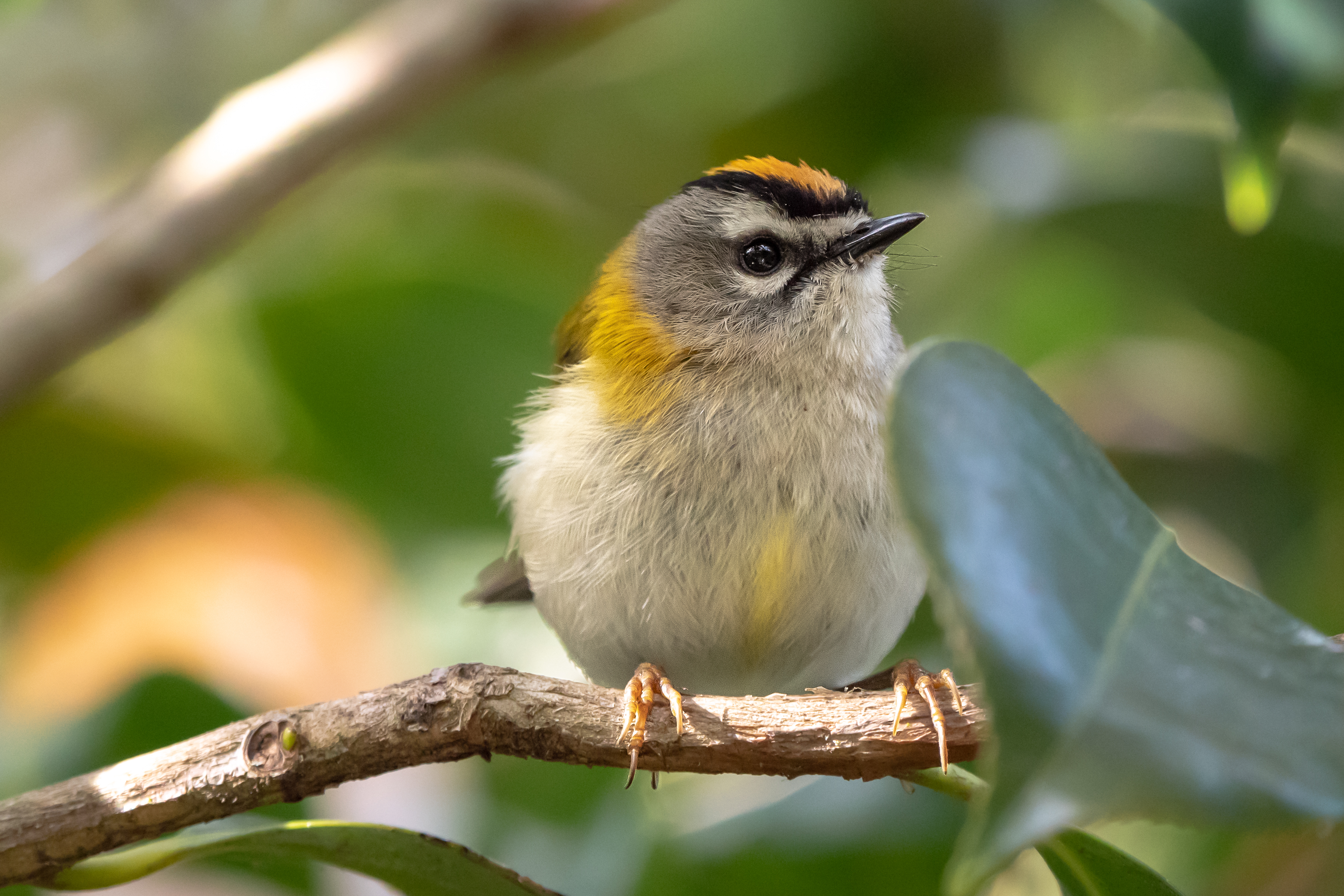
- Male

Conservation status
- Least Concern (IUCN 3.1)

Scientific classification
- Kingdom: Animalia
- Phylum: Chordata
- Class: Aves
- Order: Passeriformes
- Family: Regulidae
- Genus: Regulus
- Species: R. madeirensis

Binomial name
- Regulus madeirensis Harcourt, 1851
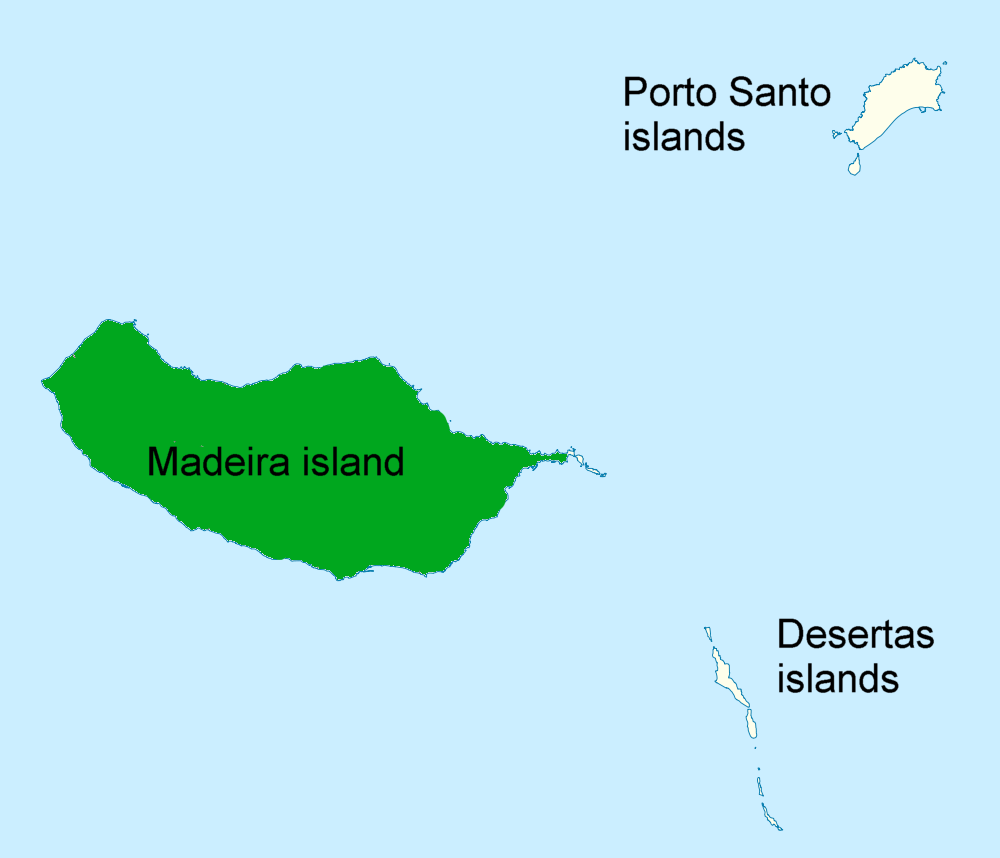
- The Madeira firecrest is an endemic resident of the main island of the Madeira archipelago

Synonyms
- Regulus ignicapilla madeirensis

= Madeira firecrest =

Very small passerine bird in the kinglet family from Madeira

The Madeira firecrest, Madeira kinglet, or Madeiracrest (Regulus madeirensis) is a very small passerine bird endemic to the island of Madeira. It is a member of the kinglet family. Before it was recognised as a separate species in 2003, it was classified as a subspecies of the common firecrest. It differs in appearance and vocalisations from its relative, and genetic analysis has confirmed it as a different species. The Madeiran bird has green upperparts, whitish underparts and two white wingbars, and a distinctive head pattern with a black eye stripe, short white supercilium, and a crest that is mainly orange in the male and yellow in the female.

The female Madeira firecrest builds a spherical nest from cobwebs, moss and small twigs, and she incubates the eggs and broods the chicks on her own. Both parents feed the young. This species forages for insects and other small invertebrates in tree heath, laurisilva and other woodland. It is common within its restricted range, and is not considered to be threatened.

== Description ==
The Madeira firecrest is a small plump bird, of 9–10 cm (3.5–3.9 in) length and weighing about 5 g (0.18 oz). It has bright olive-green upperparts with a bronze-coloured patch on each shoulder, and whitish underparts washed with brownish grey on the breast and flanks. It has two white wingbars, a tiny black bill and brownish-black legs. The head pattern is striking, with a black eye stripe, white supercilium and a crest which is yellow in the female and mainly orange in the male. Juveniles have a grey tinge to the duller upperparts, and lack the crown and eye stripes and supercilium; by their first winter, only the flight and tail feathers remain unmoulted, and the young birds are virtually indistinguishable from the adults in the field. This kinglet usually hops with its body held horizontally, and its flight is weak and whirring, with occasional jinking.

Compared to the common firecrest, the Madeiran firecrest has a longer bill and legs, a shorter white supercilium, more black on the wings and a deeper golden-bronze shoulder patch; the male's crest is duller orange. Juveniles have plainer heads, lacking the dull supercilium shown by the young of the European species.

The vocalisations of Madeiran and common firecrests both consist of high-pitched notes, but the Madeiran bird has its song divided into three distinct parts, whereas that of the more widespread species just accelerates gradually and covers a much smaller frequency range. The calls of both species include high-pitched fine vocalisations zuu zu-zi-zi, although the Madeiran firecrest also has a distinctive shrill wheez and a whistled peep.

== Taxonomy ==
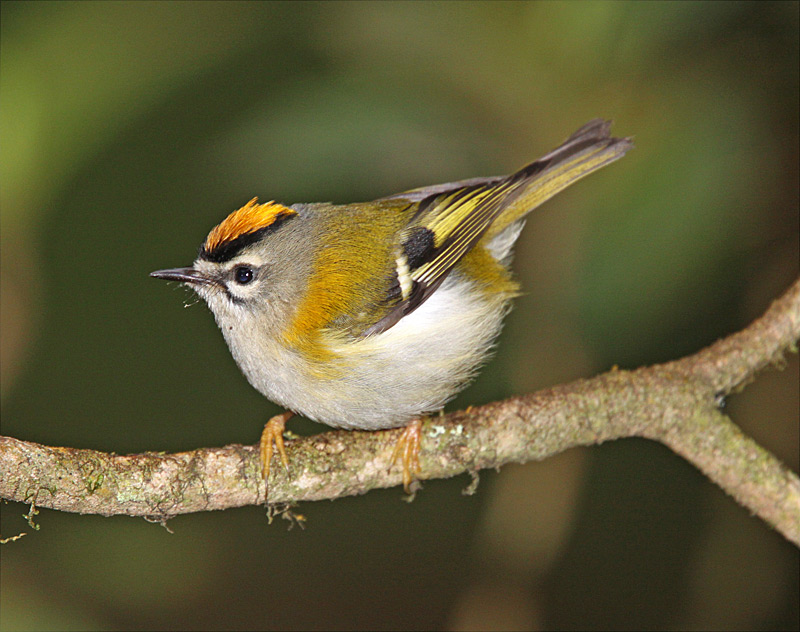
Madeira firecrest

The kinglets are a small group of birds sometimes included in the Old World warblers, but frequently given family status, especially as recent research showed that, despite superficial similarities, the crests are taxonomically remote from the warblers. The names of the family, Regulidae, and its type genus, Regulus, are derived from the Latin regulus, a diminutive of rex, "a king", and refer to the characteristic orange or yellow crests of adult kinglets. The species name madeirensis is derived from the island on which this bird is found. The Madeira firecrest was first described by English naturalist Edward Vernon Harcourt in 1851. Until recently, it was considered to be a subspecies, R. i. madeirensis, of the common firecrest R. ignicapillus. A phylogenetic analysis based on the cytochrome b gene showed that the Madeiran form is distinct at the species level from the firecrest nominate subspecies R. i. ignicapillus. Cytochrome b gene divergence between the Madeira firecrest and the European bird is 8.5%, comparable with the divergence level between other recognised Regulus species, such as the 9% between the goldcrest and the golden-crowned kinglet. The split was accepted by the Association of European Rarities Committees (AERC) in 2003, but some authorities, such as Clements, have not yet recognised the new species. The International Ornithological Congress' recommended English name for this species was "Madeiracrest", but this has been changed to "Madeira firecrest".

The songs of the four subspecies of common firecrest (nominate R. i. ignicapillus, Mediterranean R. i. balearicus, southeastern R. i. caucasicus and North African R. i. laeneni) show a number of different song forms, but in general are very similar to each other, whereas the Madeiran firecrest has only one song type, which is divided into three phrases, two of them consisting of modified display and anger calls. Its display calls use a larger frequency range and more harmonics than the continental subspecies. Male common firecrests do not show a territorial response to recordings of the songs or calls of the Madeiran taxon, although Madeiran firecrests do react strongly to playback of the calls of the mainland birds. The island form was recognized as a separate species on the basis of differences from the mainland form in morphology, vocalisations, and genetics.

The Atlantic archipelagos of the Canaries, Azores, and Madeira have a volcanic origin and they have never been part of a continent. The formation of Madeira started in the Miocene and the island was substantially complete 700,000 years ago. In the distant past the major islands of these archipelagos were all colonised by Regulus species, which evolved on their respective islands isolated from mainland populations. The firecrest descendant evolved in Madeira and goldcrest subspecies evolved on the other islands. Cytochrome b gene divergence between common firecrests from Europe and Madeira firecrests suggests an evolutionary separation roughly 4 million years ago, considerably earlier than the 2.2 million years ago maximum estimate for the goldcrest radiations in the Canaries and Azores.

== Distribution and habitat ==
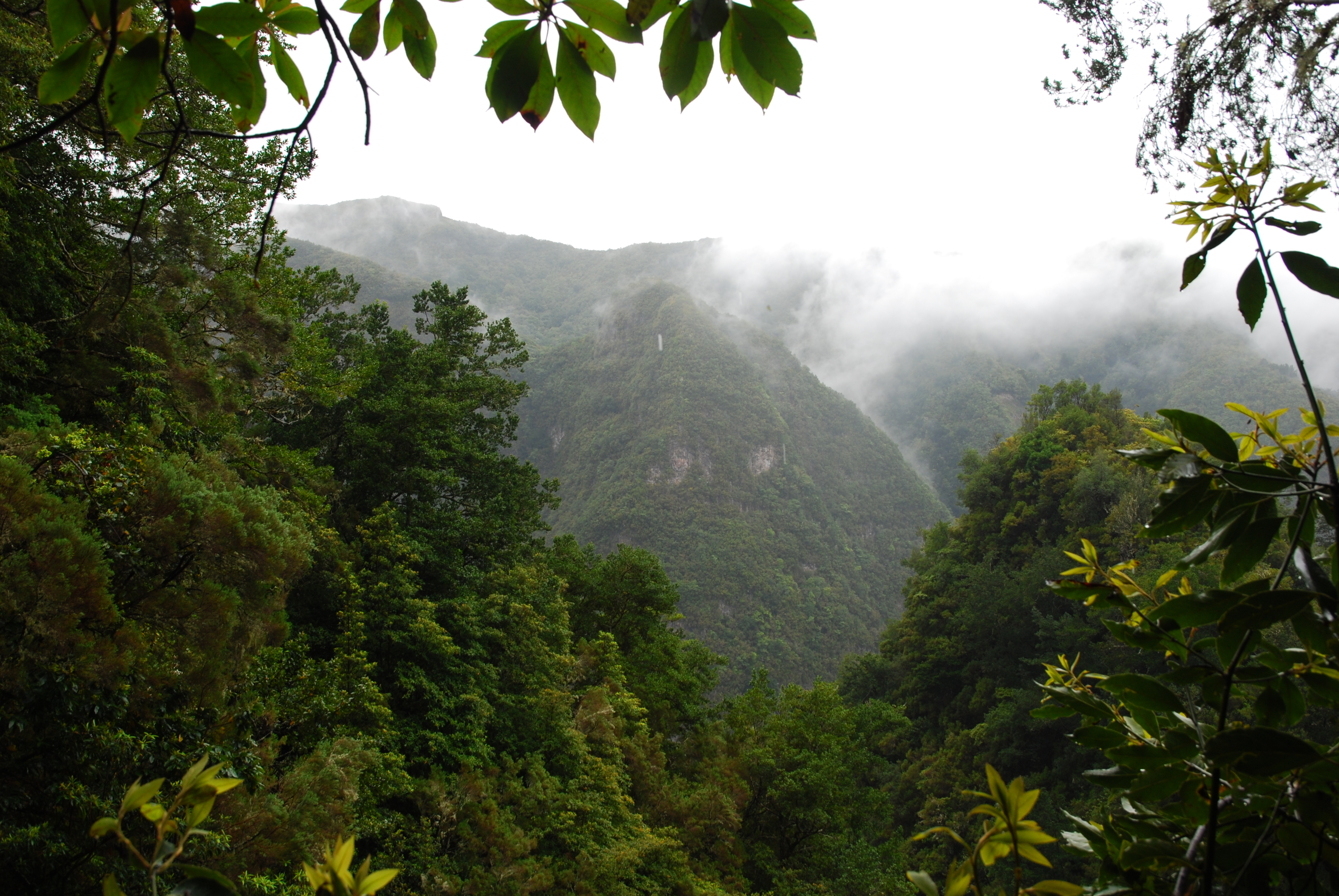
Laurel forest in Madeira

The Madeira firecrest is endemic to the main island of Madeira. It occurs mainly at higher levels from 600 to 1,550m (1,950–4,900ft) in all types of forests and scrub, but with a preference for tree heaths. It can also descend to lower areas after breeding. Although it is strongly adapted to endemic tree heaths, it also breeds in broom, Vaccinium, relict laurel forest, oak-dominated deciduous forest and stands of the introduced Japanese cedar, Cryptomeria japonica. It is absent from the alien eucalyptus and acacia plantations which have replaced much of the endemic Madeiran laurel forest.

== Behaviour ==
=== Breeding ===
The male Madeira firecrest sings during the breeding season, often with its crest raised, and has a display which involves pointing its bill at another bird, showing the crest and strong face pattern. This differs from the display of the plainer-faced goldcrest, which bows its head to emphasize the crest. The Madeira firecrest is monogamous. As is typical for the family, the nest is a closed cup built in three layers with a small entrance hole near its top. The nest's outer layer is made from moss, small twigs, cobwebs and lichen, the spider webs also being used to attach the nest to the thin branches that support it. The middle layer is moss, and this is lined with feathers (up to 3,000) and hair. It is constructed by the female alone, although the male will accompany the female while she builds the nest over a period of a few days to three weeks.

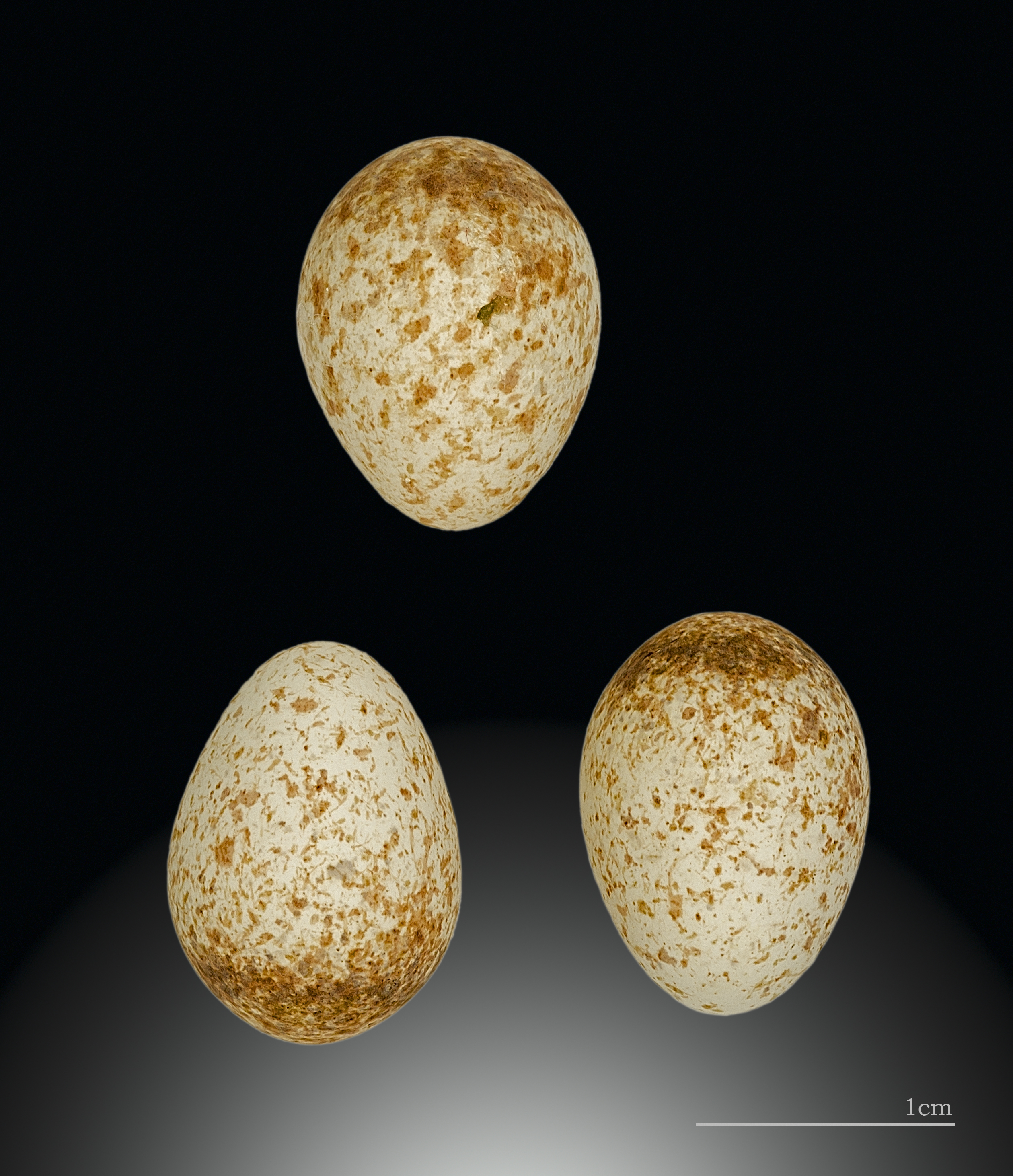
Regulus madeirensis - MHNT

The eggs are described as like those of a Phylloscopus warbler (white with some brown speckles), unlike the eggs of the common firecrest, which are pink with very indistinct reddish markings at the broad end. The clutch size is unknown, but believed to be smaller than the 7–12 of the nominate race of common firecrest. The female incubates the eggs for 14.5 to 16.5 days to hatching, and broods the chicks, which fledge 19 to 20 days after hatching. Both parents feed the chicks and fledged young.

=== Feeding ===
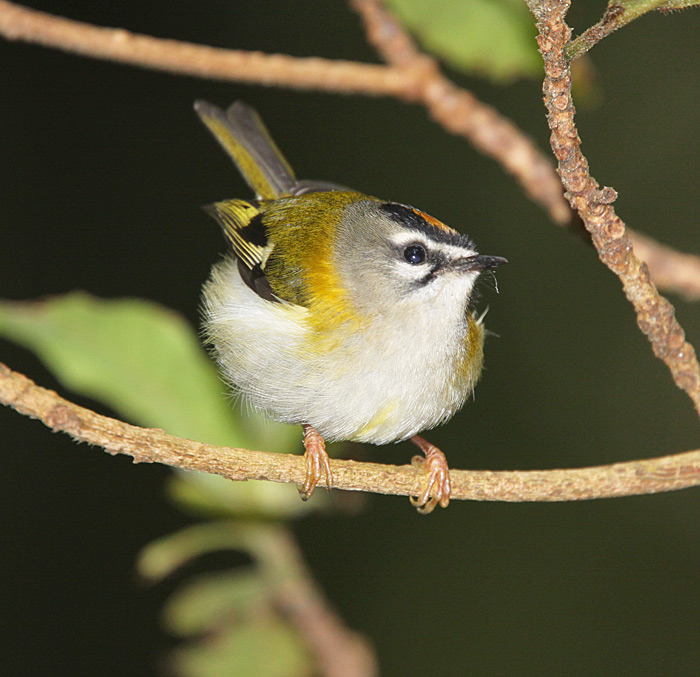
Male

All Regulus species are almost exclusively insectivorous, preying on small arthropods with soft cuticles, such as springtails, aphids and spiders. They also feed on the cocoons and eggs of spiders and insects, and occasionally take pollen. Regulus madeirensis favours large-sized prey such as moths and caterpillars (Lepidoptera). The Madeira firecrest feeds in trees, exploiting mainly the upper surface of branches in coniferous habitat and of leaves in deciduous trees. This is in contrast to the goldcrest, which frequently feeds on the undersides of branches and leaves. The Madeira firecrest also forages in the moss and lichen which often covers the branches and trunks of laurel and oak trees.

== Predators and parasites ==
The limited species diversity of Madeira means that there are relatively few potential predators. Of the three birds of prey, the common buzzard and common kestrel take mainly mammalian prey; however, the dark Macaronesian subspecies of the Eurasian sparrowhawk, Accipiter nisus granti, is a specialist predator of woodland birds.

Other than bats, there are no native land mammals, although there are a number of introduced species, two of which will take birds or chicks. These are brown rats and feral domestic cats. Even the high mountain nest sites of the endangered Zino's petrel are at risk from these predators.

Data on specific parasites of the Madeira firecrest is lacking, but the widespread flea Dasypsyllus gallinulae has been recorded in a related Regulus species, and significant infection by non-native pathogens such as avian pox and avian malaria has been detected in another Macaronesian bird, the Berthelot's pipit.

== Status ==
The Madeira firecrest's range consists of a single island, on which it appears to be fairly common to very common, Its population is estimated as between 100,000 and 200,000 individuals and is increasing. It is therefore classed as least concern on the IUCN Red List.

There are no current threats, although there is a potential concern because of fragmentation and loss of native forest habitat, (e.g. replacement of laurisilva with introduced eucalyptus plantations) but its ability to occupy plantations of some of the non-native tree species has ameliorated this factor to some extent.
