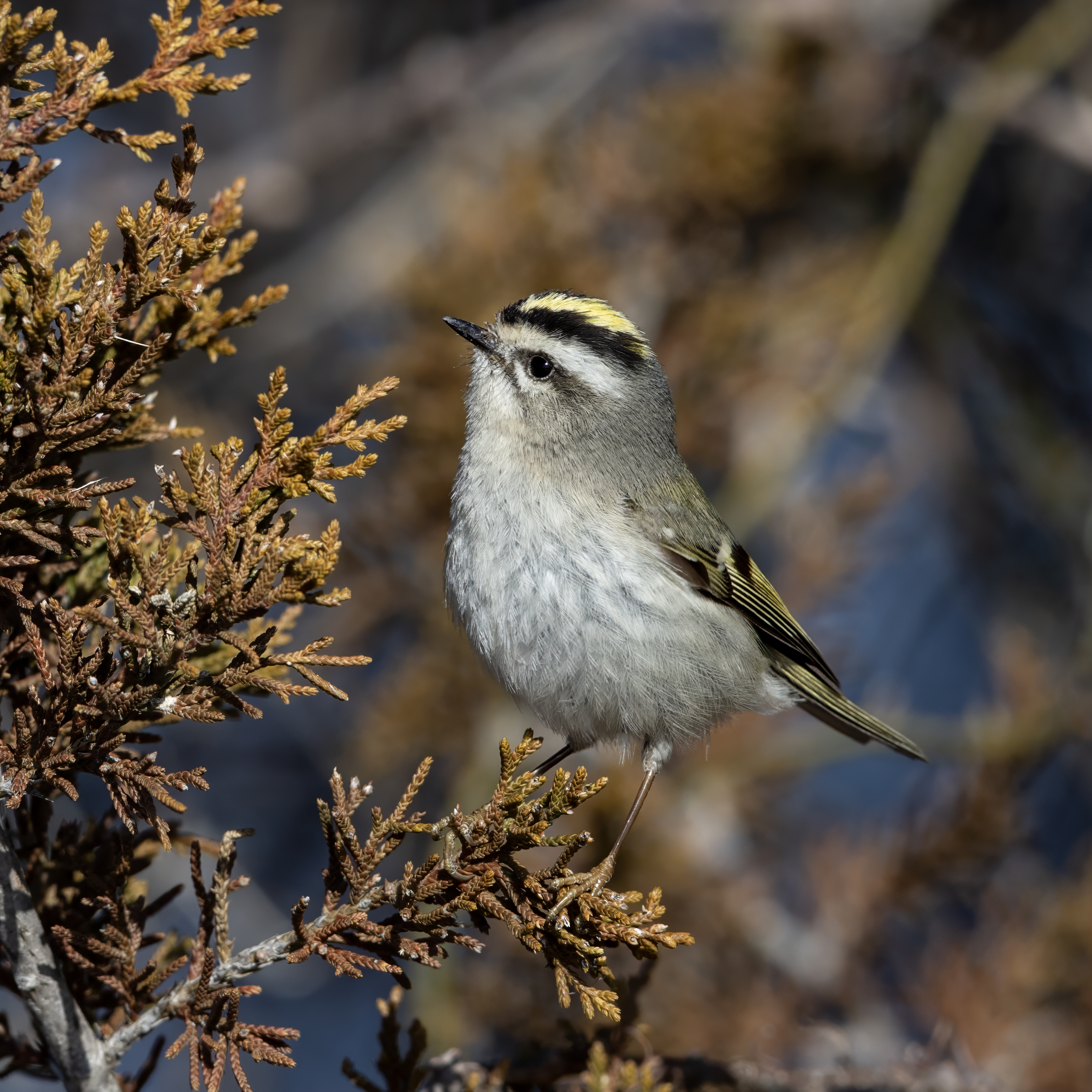
- Golden-crowned kinglet (R. satrapa)

Scientific classification
- Kingdom: Animalia
- Phylum: Chordata
- Class: Aves
- Order: Passeriformes
- Family: Regulidae
- Genus: Regulus; Cuvier, 1800

Species
- See text

= Regulus (bird) =

Genus of birds

Regulus is a genus of bird in the family Regulidae.

It contains all kinglet species aside from the ruby-crowned kinglet (Corthylio calendula), which was formerly classified in Regulus but is now assigned to its own genus.

== Taxonomy ==
The name of the genus is derived from the Latin regulus, a diminutive of rex, "a king", and refers to the characteristic orange or yellow crests of adult kinglets.

Several forms have only recently had their status clarified. The Madeira firecrest was formerly considered to be a subspecies, R. i. madeirensis, of the common firecrest R. ignicapillus. A phylogenetic analysis based on the cytochrome b gene showed that the Madeiran form is distinct at the species level from the firecrest nominate subspecies R. i. ignicapillus. Cytochrome b gene divergence between the Madeira firecrest and the European bird is 8.5%, comparable with the divergence level between other recognised Regulus species, such as the 9% between the goldcrest and the golden-crowned kinglet. The split was accepted by the Association of European Rarities Committees (AERC) in 2003. The golden-crowned kinglet is similar in appearance to the common firecrest and has been considered to be its New World equivalent, but it is actually closer to the goldcrest.

Goldcrests from the Canary Islands are particularly distinctive having a black forehead, pink-buff underparts and a darker closed wing, and have been sometimes treated either as a subspecies of the common firecrest or as a different Regulus species altogether. They were sometimes called the Tenerife goldcrest, no matter which of the islands they lived on; however, a 2006 study of the vocalisations of these birds indicate that they actually comprise two subspecies of the Goldcrest that are separable on voice; R. r. teneriffae occurring on Tenerife and the newly described subspecies, R. r. ellenthalerae, occurring on the smaller islands of La Palma and El Hierro. The three goldcrest taxa on the Azores, Santa Maria goldcrest, Sao Miguel goldcrest and Western Azores goldcrest, represent recent colonisations from Europe, and are best treated as subspecies.

The relationships of the flamecrest or Taiwan firecrest (Regulus goodfellowi) of Taiwan have also been a source of much debate. It is sometimes viewed as a race of firecrest, but its territorial song resembles those of the Himalayan races of goldcrest, and genetic data show that it is the closest relative of that species, and, despite its alternative name, only distantly related to the firecrest. The flamecrest diverged from the Goldcrest 3.0–3.1 mya (million years ago).

== Species ==
Species in taxonomic sequence
Common and binomial name	Image	Description	Range
Common firecrest Regulus ignicapilla		Bright olive-green upperparts with bronze shoulder patches, and whitish underparts with brownish-grey on the breast and flanks. The head has a black eye stripe, long white supercilium, and a crest, bright yellow in the female and mainly orange in the male.	Western and Southern Europe and North Africa
Madeira firecrest Regulus madeirensis		Compared to the common firecrest, this species has a longer bill and legs, a shorter white supercilium, more black on the wings and a deeper golden-bronze shoulder patch; the male's crest is duller orange.	Madeira
Golden-crowned kinglet Regulus satrapa		Olive-grey upperparts and white underparts. They have white wing bars, a black stripe through the eyes and a yellow crown surrounded by black. The adult male has an orange patch in the middle of the yellow crown.	North America
Flamecrest or Taiwan firecrest Regulus goodfellowi		Upperparts green, rump and flanks yellow, and underparts are buff. There is a white wing bar. The crown has black stripes and a crest, orange-yellow in male and yellow in female. White around the eye and a white supercilium. Throat and neck sides are grey.	Taiwan
Goldcrest Regulus regulus		Olive-green upperparts, buff-white underparts and a plain face with conspicuous black irides. The crown of the head has black sides and a narrow black front, and a bright crest, yellow with an orange centre in the male, and entirely yellow in the female.	Most of Europe and Asia

=== Fossils ===
There are a few Pleistocene (2.6 million to 12,000 years BP) records from Europe of extant Regulus species, mostly goldcrests or unidentifiable to species. The only fossil of an extinct Regulus is a left ulna from 2.6 to 1.95 mya in Bulgaria, which was identified as belonging to an extinct species, Regulus bulgaricus. The goldcrest lineage diverged from this apparent ancestor of the common firecrest in the Middle Pleistocene.

== Status ==
The three continental Regulus species all have very large ranges and populations. The two single-island endemics are common within their habitat, and are not thought to be at risk. All kinglets are therefore classified as Least Concern on the IUCN Red List.
