= USS Firecrest =

USS Firecrest is a name used more than once by the U.S. Navy:

- USS Firecrest (AMc-33), a coastal minesweeper placed in service on 4 April 1941
- Firecrest was the name assigned on 17 May 1945 to the minesweeper designated AM-394, but the ship was never built
- USS Firecrest (AMS-10), formerly YMS-231 was reclassified 17 February 1947
