= USS Firecrest (AMc-33) =

Minesweeper of the United States Navy

History

United States
- Ordered: as S. G. Giuseppe
- Laid down: 1937
- Launched: 1937
- Acquired: 5 November 1940
- In service: 4 April 1941
- Out of service: 18 September 1944
- Stricken: 14 October 1944
- Fate: Delivered to the War Shipping Administration on 3 April 1945

General characteristics
- Displacement: 170 tons (standard)
- Length: 76 ft 6 in (23.32 m) overall
- Beam: 21 ft 5 in (6.53 m)
- Draft: 4 ft 5 in (1.35 m)
- Speed: 9.0 knots (17 km/h)
- Complement: 17
- Armament: two .50 cal (12.7 mm) machine guns and four rifles

USS Firecrest (AMc-33) was a Firecrest-class coastal minesweeper acquired by the United States Navy for the dangerous task of removing mines from minefields laid in the water to prevent ships from passing.

The wooden-hulled purse seiner S. G. Giuseppe, built in 1937 at Wilmington, Los Angeles, by the boatbuilders Trigoning and Carlson, was acquired by the Navy from M. B. Giuseppe, of San Pedro, Los Angeles, on 5 November 1940, and delivery and acceptance by the Commandant, 11th Naval District, took place the same day. Conversion to a coastal minesweeper began immediately, at the Campbell Machine Co., of San Diego, California; renamed Firecrest and designated as a coastal minesweeper (AMc-33), the ship was placed in service on 4 April 1941, Ensign Charles S. Judson Jr., USNR, officer-in-charge.

== World War II service ==
By the end of April 1941, Firecrest was operating out of the Section Base, San Diego, north of the destroyer base at that port. In concert with USS Courser (AMc-32), she began daily operations in San Diego harbor, streaming her sweep gear; she also conducted independent sweeping operations during that time. As the spring of 1941 gave way to the summer, Firecrest alternately swept the harbor waters with her magnetic or acoustical gear, patrolled, or conducted training. On 17 July 1941, during a towing operation in a heavy ground swell, she lost one of her 400-pound anchors.

=== Attack on Pearl Harbor ===
After a brief period out of commission pending the arrival of new parts for her 540 kilowatt generator engine (3–4 December 1941), she resumed active operations on 5 December 1941, underway on assigned duty planting drill mines. Two days later, however, the Japanese surprise attack against the U.S. Pacific Fleet at Pearl Harbor resulted in emergency duty for Firecrest at the harbor entrance, with four new men being assigned to her complement.

=== Assigned minesweeping and patrol duties ===
With her home yard at Mare Island, Vallejo, California, and her home port, San Diego, Firecrest was transferred from duty under Commander, Western Sea Frontier to Commander, Naval Local Defense Forces, 11th Naval District, on 16 March 1943. She conducted coastal patrol and minesweeping operations into the following summer.

=== Services no longer required ===
Firecrest's services "no longer required in minesweeping duties," Commandant, 11th Naval District, was requested (20 July 1944) to remove all type and military equipment and place her out of service with an eye toward future disposition. Accordingly, placed out of service on 18 September 1944, Firecrest was stricken from the Navy Register on 14 October 1944 and delivered to the War Shipping Administration on 3 April 1945.

== Post-war return to fishing ==
Reverting to her original name, S. G. Giuseppe, soon thereafter, and under the ownership of Antonio D'Ambra of Los Angeles, California, she operated in the fishing trade into the early 1950s.
