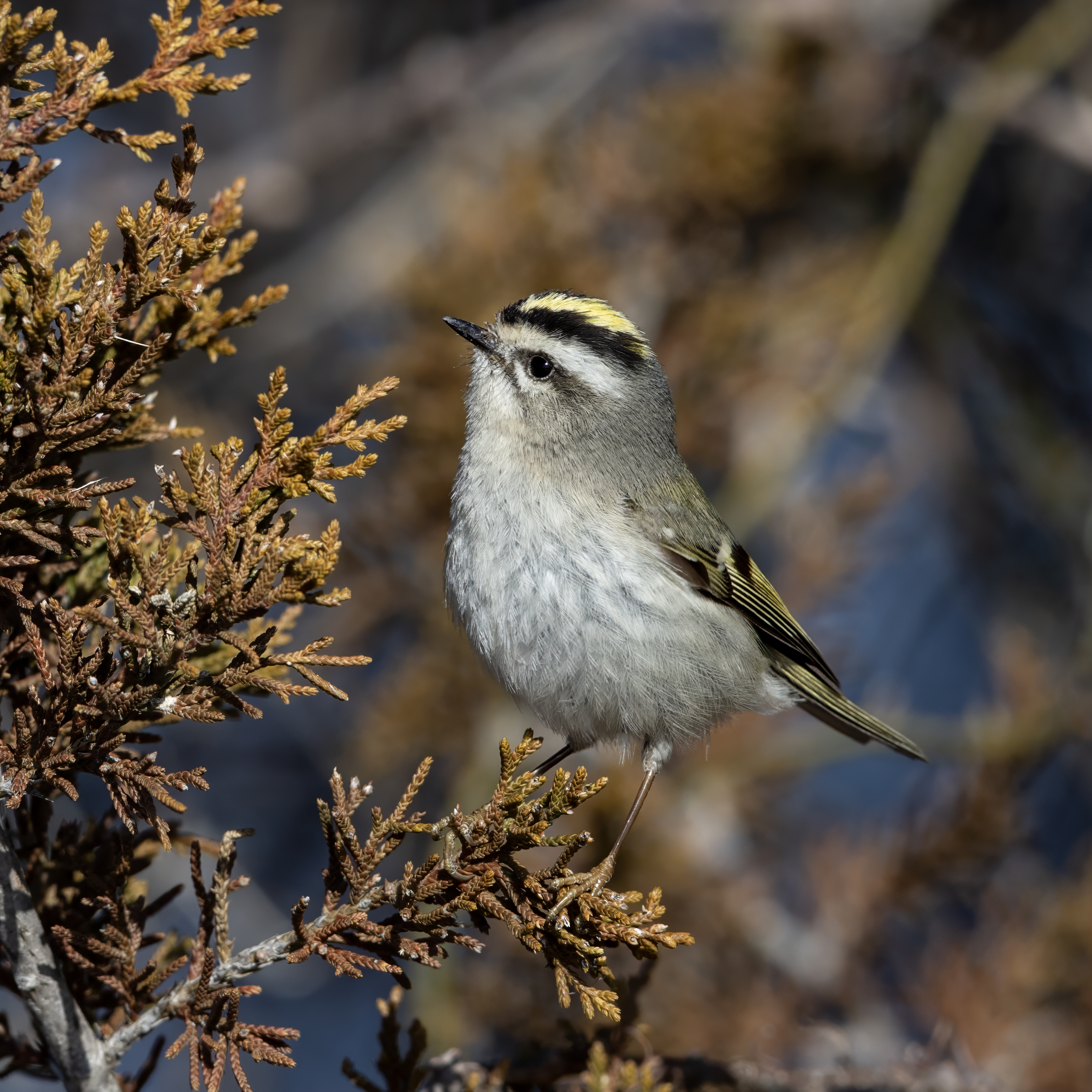

Conservation status
- Least Concern (IUCN 3.1)

- Secure (NatureServe)

Scientific classification
- Kingdom: Animalia
- Phylum: Chordata
- Class: Aves
- Order: Passeriformes
- Family: Regulidae
- Genus: Regulus
- Species: R. satrapa

Binomial name
- Regulus satrapa Lichtenstein, MHC, 1823
- Range map of the golden-crowned kinglet. The breeding range is highlighted in orange, the migration range in yellow, the non-breeding range in blue, and the year-round range in purple.

= Golden-crowned kinglet =

Species of bird

The golden-crowned kinglet (Regulus satrapa) is a very small songbird in the family Regulidae that lives throughout much of North America.

== Description ==
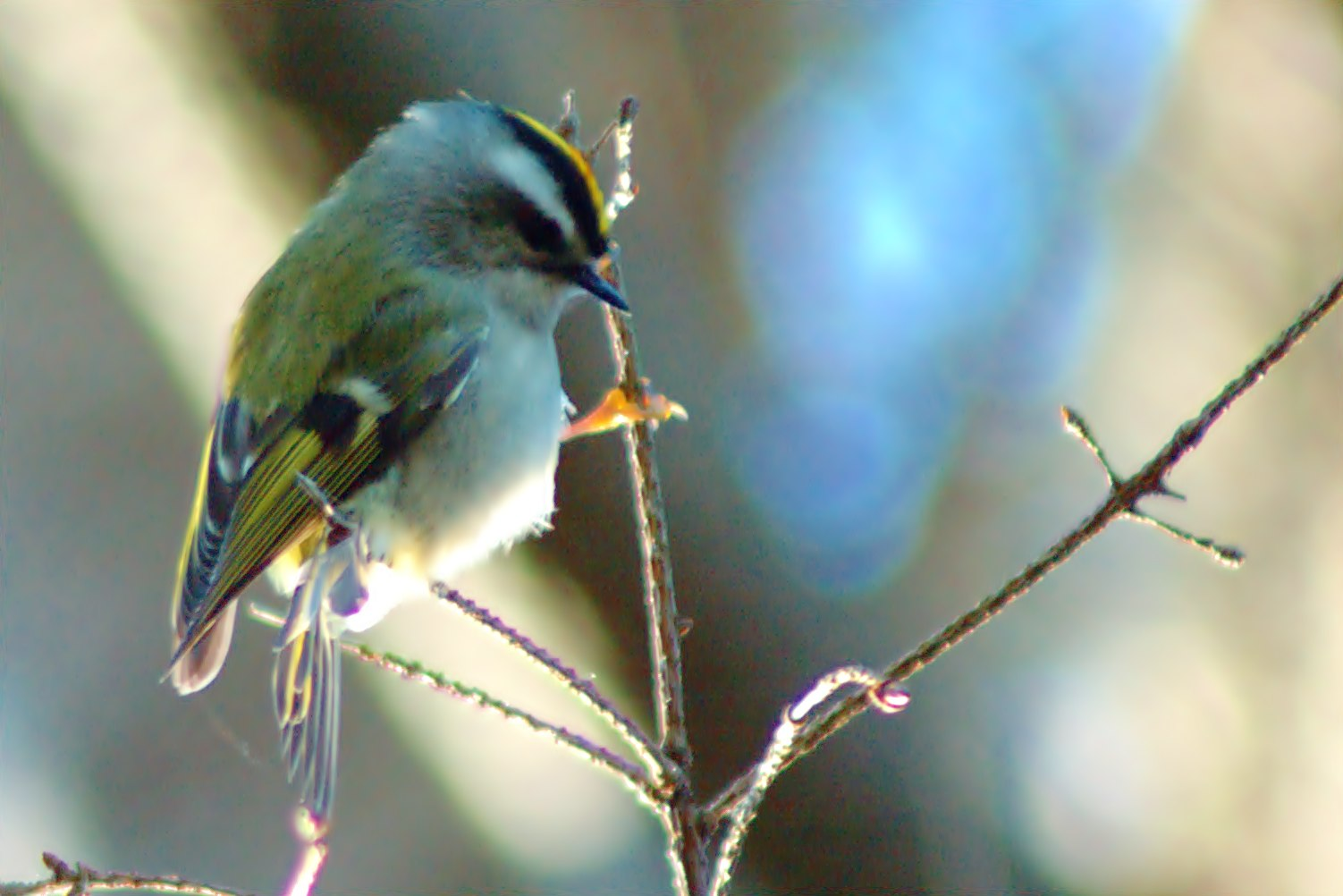
The golden-crowned kinglet is generally similar to the related ruby-crowned kinglet.

Adults are olive-gray on the upper parts with white underparts, thin bills and short tails. They have white wing bars, a black stripe through the eyes and a yellow crown surrounded by black. The adult male has an orange patch in the middle of the yellow crown. Despite its tiny body, it can survive very cold winter conditions by staying active and searching for food. The juvenile is similar to the adult, but with a browner back and without the yellow crown. This is one of the smallest passerines in North America. Its length, at 8 to 11 cm (3.1 to 4.3 in), is probably the shortest of any American passerine. Its weight, averaging 6.1 g (0.22 oz) for females and 6.3 g (0.22 oz) for males and ranging from 4.5 to 7.8 g (0.16 to 0.28 oz), is similar to the American bushtit and black-tailed gnatcatcher. The golden-crowned kinglet has a wingspan of 5.5–7.1 in (14–18 cm).

== Ecology ==
The golden-crowned kinglet is insectivorous, foraging in trees or shrubs, where it eats insects (especially caterpillars), insect eggs and spiders. It produces a series of high-pitched calls on a single note, and tends not to fear human approach. Its nest is a well-concealed hanging cup suspended from a conifer branch. Golden-crowned kinglets may form tight huddles when overwintering.

== Distribution ==
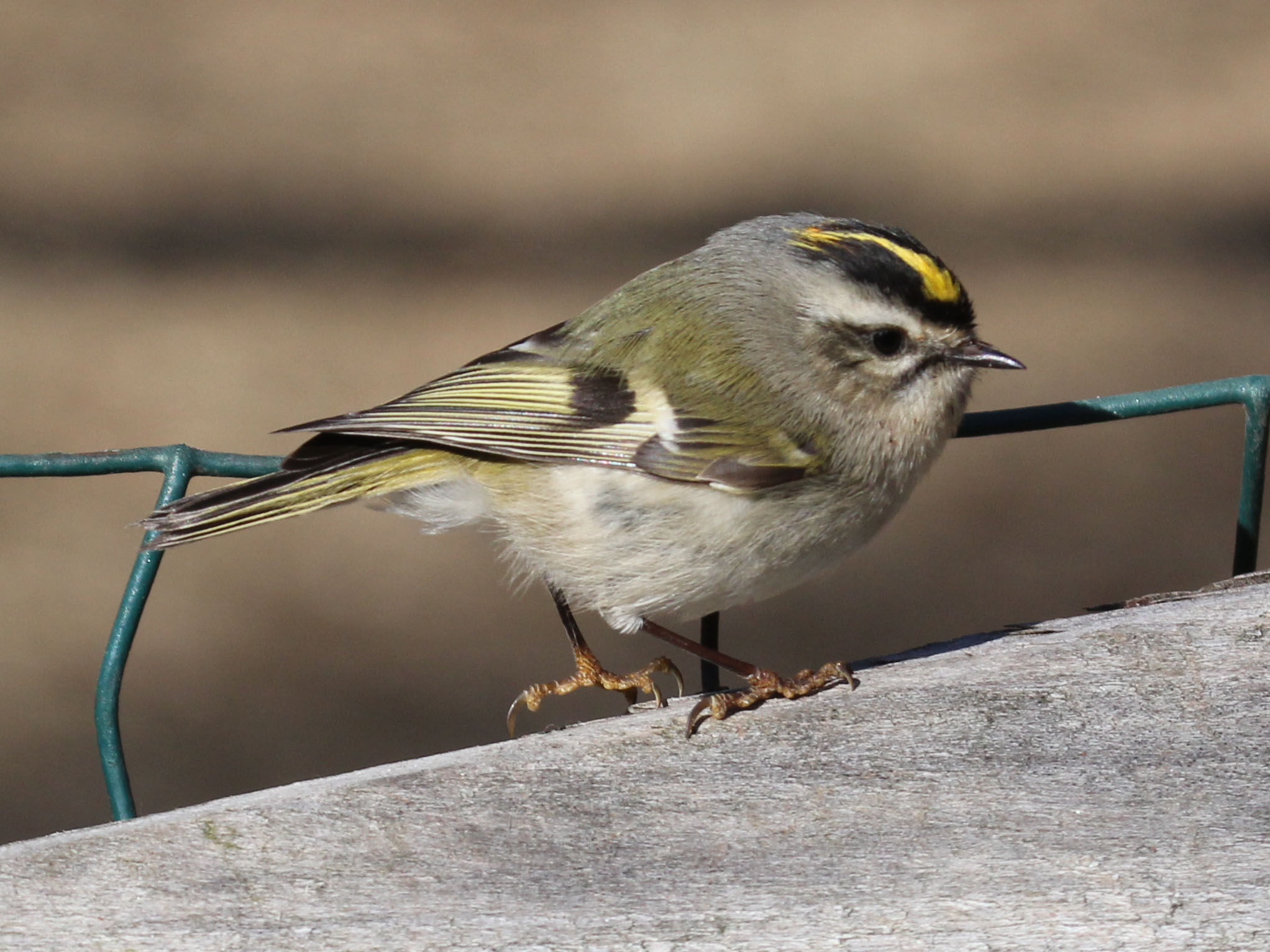
The golden-crowned kinglet is a non-breeding resident in the winter in North Carolina.

The golden-crowned kinglet is a widespread migratory bird found in forests across North America, including Canada, Guatemala, Mexico, Saint Pierre and Miquelon, and the United States. Its breeding habitat is coniferous forests across Canada, the northeastern and western United States, Mexico and Central America. It migrates to the United States in the non-breeding season. Some birds are permanent residents in coastal regions and in the southern parts of their range. Northern birds remain further north in winter than the ruby-crowned kinglet.

== Taxonomy ==
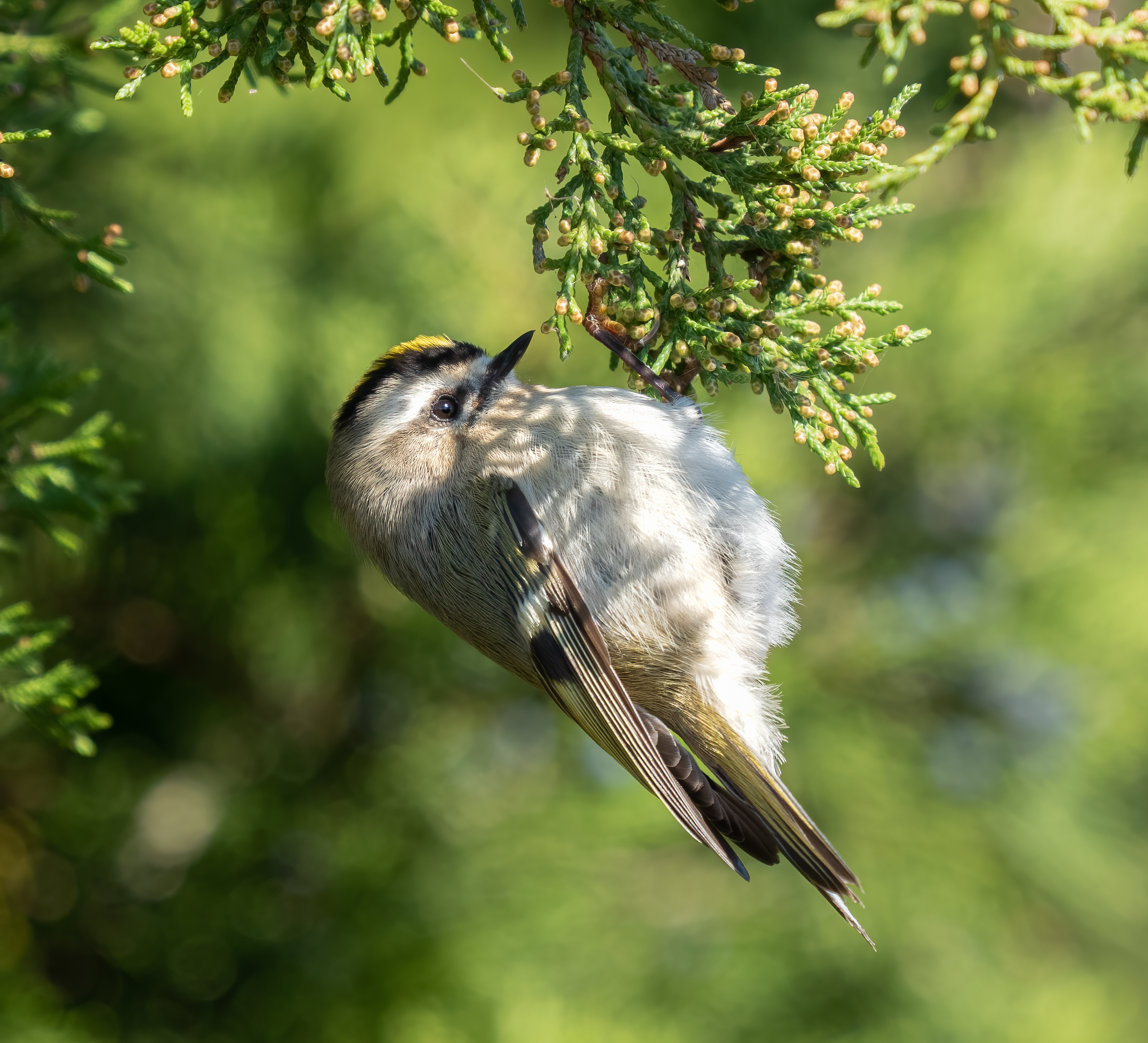
Golden-crowned kinglet hanging from an Eastern juniper (Juniperus virginiana)

The kinglets are a small group of birds sometimes included in the Old World warblers, but frequently given family status, especially as recent research showed that, despite superficial similarities, the crests are taxonomically remote from the warblers. The names of the family, Regulidae, and the genus, Regulus, are derived from the Latin regulus, a diminutive of rex, "a king", and refer to the characteristic orange or yellow crests of adult kinglets.

There are three migratory subspecies in the United States and Canada, differing in size, bill length, back and rump colors, wing bar width and color, and length of supercilium:

- R. s. apache, breeding and wintering from southern Alaska and the southern Yukon to southwestern California and southern New Mexico. This subspecies is medium-small, has a long bill, and has the back and rump bright yellowish-olive.
- R. s. olivaceus, breeding from coastal southeastern Alaska to southwestern Oregon, wintering to Idaho and southwestern California. This subspecies is small, with a medium-long bill, and has the back and rump dark greenish-olive.
- R. s. satrapa, breeding from northern Alberta to Newfoundland and North Carolina. This subspecies is large, with a short bill, has the back and rump olive with a greyish wash. It differs from apache and olivaceus in two other regards: the white supercilium stops short of the rear of the crown, whereas on the other two species the supercilium extends further back, and the wingbars are wide, and white (or slightly lemon-tinged) compared with narrow dingy whitish (or lemon- or olive-washed) wingbars of the other two subspecies.

The subspecies "amoenus" has been synonymised with apache, as the distinctions between these populations are obscured by individual variation.

Two other (non-migratory) subspecies occur south of the bird's core range, although these are weakly differentiated from each other and so are perhaps best synonymised:

- R. s. aztecus in south-central Mexico, in the mountains from Michoacán south to Oaxaca. This subspecies is dark greenish above, has poorly developed wing markings, and its underparts are washed greyish-brown.
- R. s. clarus in the mountains of Chiapas, southern Mexico, and Guatemala. This subspecies resembles aztecus, but is paler and duller, with a shorter tail.

Hybridization with ruby-crowned kinglets has been reported to have possibly occurred.
