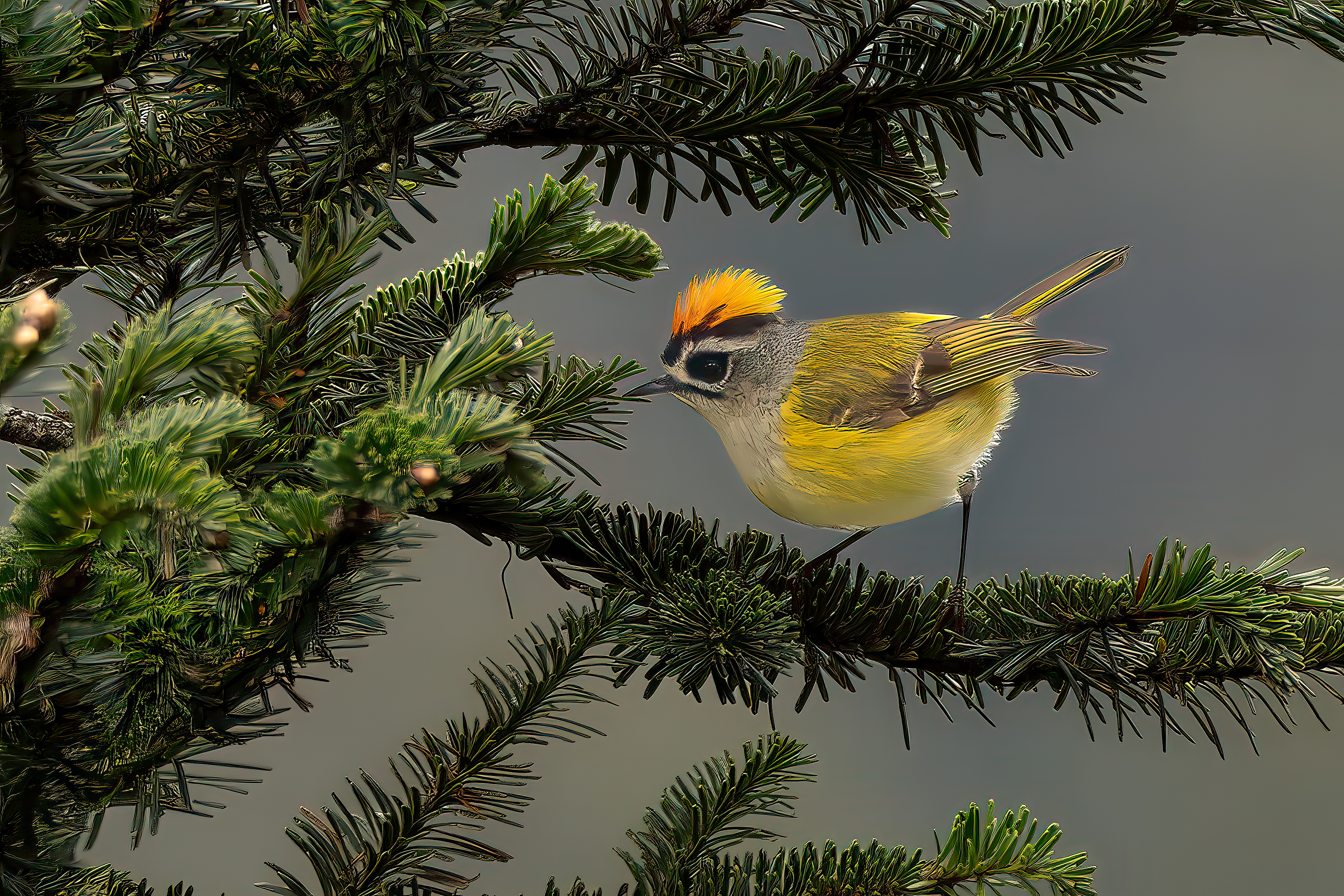

Conservation status
- Least Concern (IUCN 3.1)

Scientific classification
- Kingdom: Animalia
- Phylum: Chordata
- Class: Aves
- Order: Passeriformes
- Family: Regulidae
- Genus: Regulus
- Species: R. goodfellowi

Binomial name
- Regulus goodfellowi Ogilvie-Grant, 1906

= Flamecrest =

Species of bird

The flamecrest (Regulus goodfellowi), also known as the Taiwan firecrest, is a species of bird in the kinglet family Regulidae. It is endemic to the mountains of Taiwan.

== Description ==
The flamecrest is a small perching bird, resembling a warbler. Its length is only 9 cm (3.5 in) and weight about 7 g, making it the smallest of all Taiwan's endemic bird species, and the smallest and most colourful member of its family in the world.

The top of its head is yellow and orange, with black crown stripes. White feathers encircling the black eye-patches give it the appearance of having two black eyes. The most distinguishing characteristic is the orange-yellow crest on top of the head, for which it is named. Females have the crown stripe pure yellow while males have an orange centre to it. When excited the male erects the crest. The supercilium is very broad and the lores and forehead are whitish. There is a narrow short black malar stripe. The chin is whitish and the throat, ear-coverts and sides of neck are grey. The mantle is green while the rump and flanks are yellow. The centre of the belly is buff. The wings have broad white covert tips forming a wing bar. The tarsi are pinkish. They have a high-pitched see-see-see call and the song consists of a series of high notes.

== Taxonomy ==
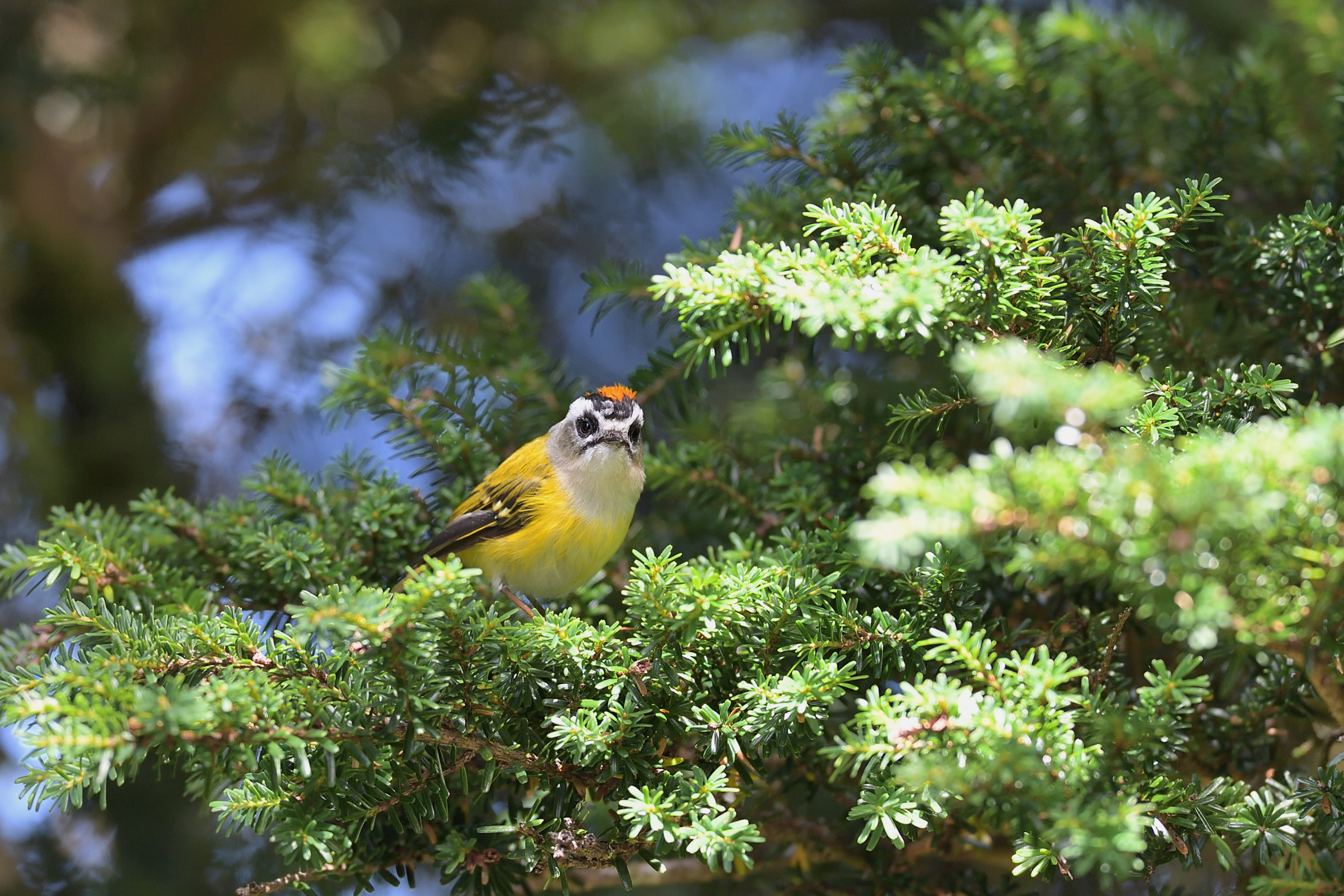

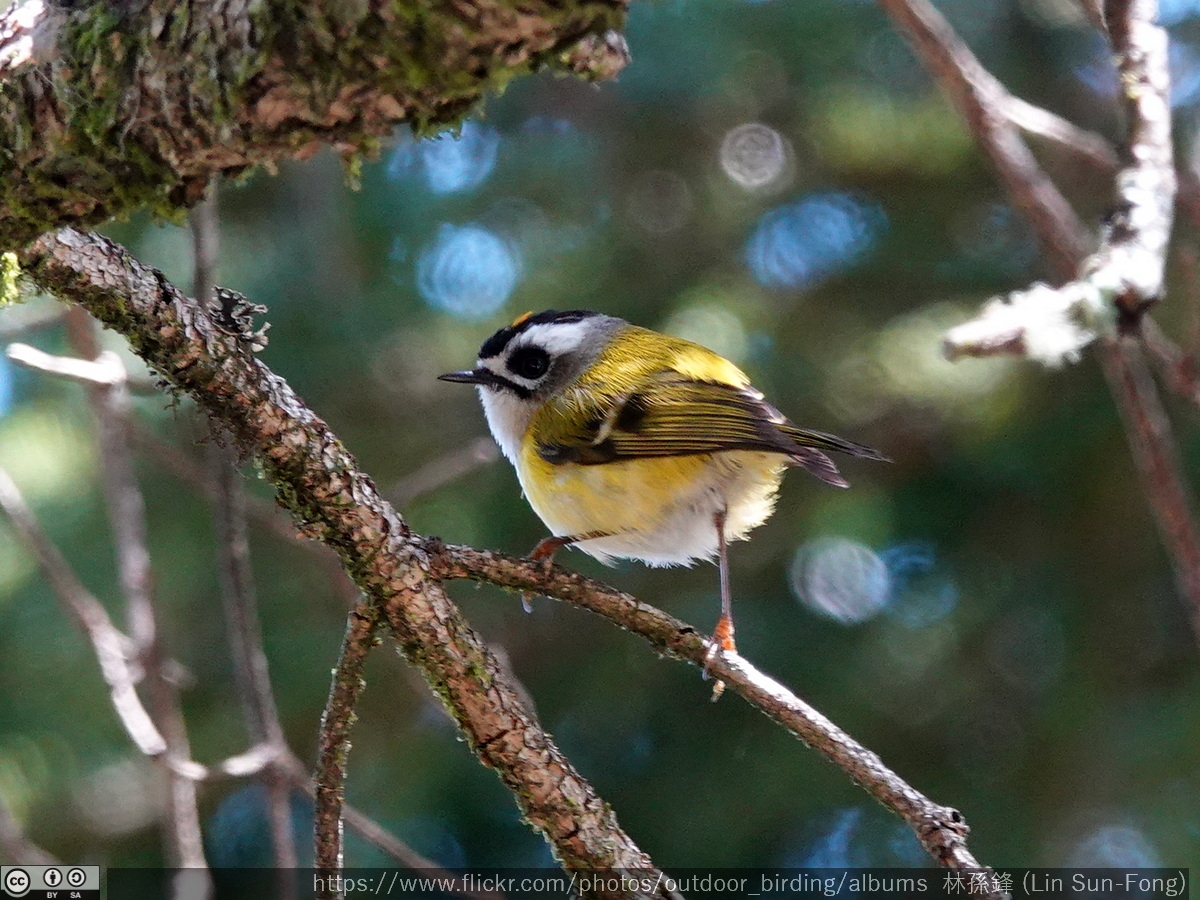

The kinglets are a small group of birds sometimes included in the Old World warblers, but frequently given family status, especially as recent research showed that, despite superficial similarities, the crests are taxonomically remote from the warblers. The names of the family Regulidae, and the genus Regulus, are derived from the Latin regulus, a diminutive of rex, "a king", and refer to the characteristic orange or yellow crests of adult kinglets. The Taiwan Firecrest was formally described by Scottish ornithologist William Ogilvie-Grant in 1906 from the writings of English explorer and ornithologist, Walter Goodfellow, who is commemorated in the binomial name.

The flamecrest has sometimes been viewed as a race of firecrest, but its territorial song resembles those of the Himalayan races of goldcrest, and genetic data shows that it is closely related to that species, and only distantly to the firecrest. The flamecrest lineage diverged from that of the goldcrest 3.0–3.1 mya.

== Distribution and habitat ==
It usually inhabits evergreen trees in coniferous forests over 2,000 m above sea level, though it is commonest above 2,500 m and ranges upward to 3,700 m. Mountains it inhabits include Alishan, Da Yu Ling, Hehuanshan, Yu Shan, and the higher areas of Anmashan. They prefer conifers in which to forage, and are usually found in the forest canopy, but will sometimes venture into lower vegetation.

An analysis of the distribution of Taiwan's 17 endemic bird species, using data from bird surveys conducted from 1993 to 2004, classified the firecrest as uncommon (along with the Formosan magpie, Taiwan bush warbler, yellow tit and Taiwan barwing). It found that the flamecrest occurred in high- and mid-altitude coniferous forests, and in high-altitude broad-leaved mixed forests, mainly at 2000–3600 m above sea level. The sites where it was recorded had an average altitude of about 2550 m, the highest of all the endemic birds. Its habitats had the coldest mean temperature and lowest warmth index of all 17 endemics, as well as the highest annual rainfall for the five uncommon species, though its distribution regarding vegetation and human disturbance was similar to those of the others.

== Behaviour ==
Flamecrests are active and restless birds, hopping and fluttering about in the canopy. These lively songbirds are mainly solitary but will move around actively in small, loose flocks of their own species as well as with coal tits and Eurasian nuthatches. The flight is weak and whirring. Their breeding biology is poorly known.

=== Feeding ===
The flamecrest is primarily an insectivore. The birds may be seen feeding on insects and their larvae on the branches and leaf sheathes of trees in coniferous forests, hovering and gleaning from leaf to stem. Weeds and berries may be taken occasionally. A study of the foraging ecology of alpine forest birds on conifers in the Taroko National Park found that, when compared with Eurasian nuthatches, coal tits, green-backed tits and black-throated tits, flamecrests were the most generalised foragers, utilising almost all of the crown of a tree, rather than specialising in parts of it as with the other species, with which it associates in mixed-species foraging flocks during the non-breeding season.

=== Voice ===
Flamecrests have fine, shrill and high-pitched calls, zi zi yi. Although noisy at close range, the voice is soft and does not carry far.
