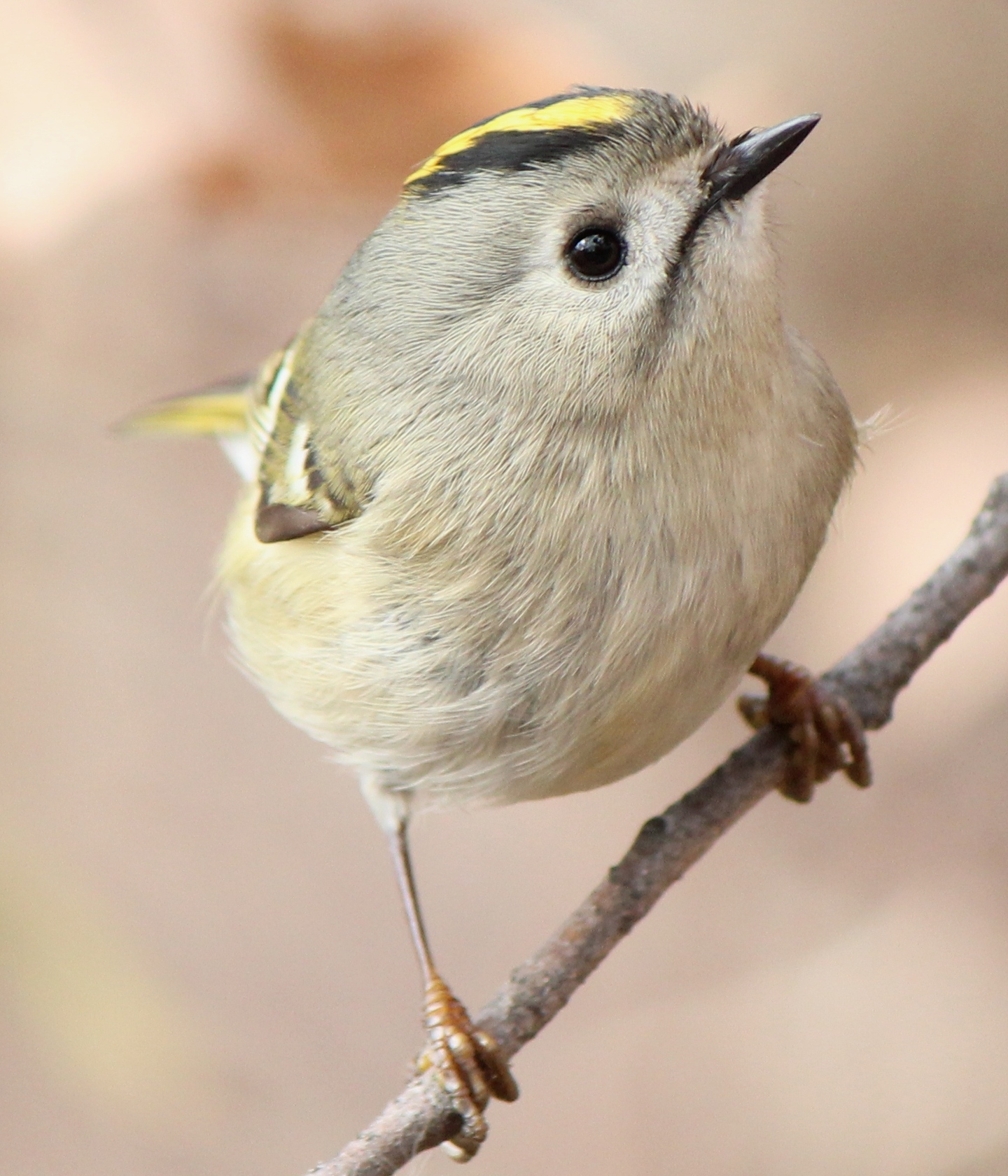
- Goldcrest (Regulus regulus) in Japan

Scientific classification
- Kingdom: Animalia
- Phylum: Chordata
- Class: Aves
- Order: Passeriformes
- Infraorder: Passerides
- Parvorder: Muscicapida
- Family: Regulidae; Vigors, 1825

Genera
- Corthylio; Regulus

= Kinglet =

Kinglets

Family of birds

The kinglets or crests are small birds in the family Regulidae. Species in this family were formerly classified with the Old World warblers. "Regulidae" is derived from the Latin word regulus, diminutive for "king", and refers to the coloured crowns of adult birds. This family has representatives in Eurasia and North America. There are six species in this family; one, the Madeira firecrest (Regulus madeirensis), was only recently split from the common firecrest as a separate species. The ruby-crowned kinglet differs sufficiently in its voice and plumage to be afforded its own genus, Corthylio.

== Description ==
Kinglets are among the smallest of all passerines, ranging in size from 8 to 11 cm (3 to 4.5 in) and weighing 6–8 g (0.21–0.28 oz); the sexes are the same size. They have medium-length wings and tails, and small needle-like bills. The plumage is overall grey-green, offset by pale wingbars, and the tail tip is incised. Five species have a single stiff feather covering the nostrils, but in the ruby-crowned kinglet this is replaced by several short, stiff bristles. Most kinglets have distinctive head markings, and the males possess a colourful crown patch. In the females, the crown is duller and yellower. The long feathers forming the central crown stripe can be erected; they are inconspicuous most of the time, but are used in courtship and territorial displays when the raised crest is very striking.

There are two species of different genera in North America with largely overlapping distributions, and two in Eurasia that also have a considerable shared range; the remaining two, at opposite ends of Eurasia, are island endemics. In each continent, one species (goldcrest in Eurasia and golden-crowned kinglet in North America) is a conifer specialist; these have deeply grooved pads on their feet for perching on conifer twigs and a long hind toe and claw for clinging vertically. The two generalists, ruby-crowned kinglet and common firecrest, hunt more in flight and have smoother soles, shorter hind claws and a longer tail.

== Taxonomy ==
Recent molecular studies have clarified the phylogeny of the Regulidae; they are now placed in their own superfamily Reguloidea, near-basal in the infraorder Passerides, the "higher songbirds", with their closest relatives probably the family Elachuridae and the superfamily Bombycilloidea (waxwings and allies).

The kinglets were first allocated to the warbler genus Sylvia by English naturalist John Latham in 1790, but moved to their current genus by French zoologist Georges Cuvier in 1800. They were formerly usually included in the Old World warblers but were given family status when it was found, that despite superficial similarities, they are phylogenetically remote from the warblers.

Most members of the genus Regulus are similar in size and colour pattern. The exception is the ruby-crowned kinglet, the largest species, which has a strongly red crest and no black crown stripes. It has distinctive vocalisations, and is different enough from the Old World kinglets and the other American species, the golden-crowned kinglet, to be assigned to a separate genus, Corthylio.

=== Species in taxonomic order ===
Image	Common name	Scientific name	Distribution
	Ruby-crowned kinglet	Corthylio calendula	North America. Three subspecies.
	Common firecrest	Regulus ignicapilla	Europe, southwest Asia, northwest Africa. Four subspecies.
	Madeira firecrest	Regulus madeirensis	Madeira (endemic). Monotypic.
	Golden-crowned kinglet	Regulus satrapa	North America. Five subspecies.
	Flamecrest	Regulus goodfellowi	Taiwan (endemic). Monotypic.
	Goldcrest	Regulus regulus	Europe, Asia. Fourteen subspecies.

== Etymology ==
The name of the family derives from the Latin regulus, a diminutive of rex, "a king", and refers to the characteristic orange or yellow crests of adult kinglets (aside from the red crest of Corthylio).

== Distribution and habitat ==
Kinglets are birds of the Nearctic and Palearctic realms, with representatives in temperate North America, Europe and Asia, northernmost Africa, Macaronesia and the Himalayas. They are adapted to conifer forests, although there is a certain amount of adaptability and most species will use other habitats, particularly during migration. In Macaronesia, they are adapted to laurisilva and tree heaths.

== Behaviour ==
=== Diet and feeding ===
The tiny size and rapid metabolism of kinglets means that they must constantly forage in order to provide their energy needs. They will continue feeding even when nest building. Kinglets prevented from feeding may lose a third of their body weight in twenty minutes and may starve to death in an hour. Kinglets are insectivores, preferentially feeding on prey such as aphids and springtails that have soft cuticles. Prey is generally gleaned from the branches and leaves of trees, although in some circumstances prey may be taken on the wing or from the leaf litter on the ground.

=== Life cycle ===
Kinglet nests are small, very neat cups, almost spherical in shape, made of moss and lichen held together with spiderwebs and hung from twigs near the end of a high branch of a conifer. They are lined with hair and feathers, and a few feathers are placed over the opening. These characteristics provide good insulation against the cold environment. The female lays 7 to 12 eggs, which are white or pale buff, some having fine dark brown spots. Because the nest is small, they are stacked in layers. The female incubates; she pushes her legs (which are well supplied with blood vessels, hence warm) down among the eggs. A unique feature of kinglets is the "size hierarchy" among eggs, with early-laid eggs being smaller than later ones.

Eggs hatch asynchronously after 15 to 17 days. The young stay in the nest for 19 to 24 days. After being fed, nestlings make their way down to the bottom of the nest, pushing their still-hungry siblings up to be fed in their turn (but also to be cold).

Kinglets are the most fecund and shortest-living of all altricial birds, and probably the shortest-lived apart from a few smaller galliform species. Adult mortality for the goldcrest is estimated at over 80 percent per year and the maximum lifespan is only six years.
