= Canary Islands goldcrest =

Canary Islands goldcrest may refer to:

- Tenerife goldcrest
- Western Canary Islands goldcrest
