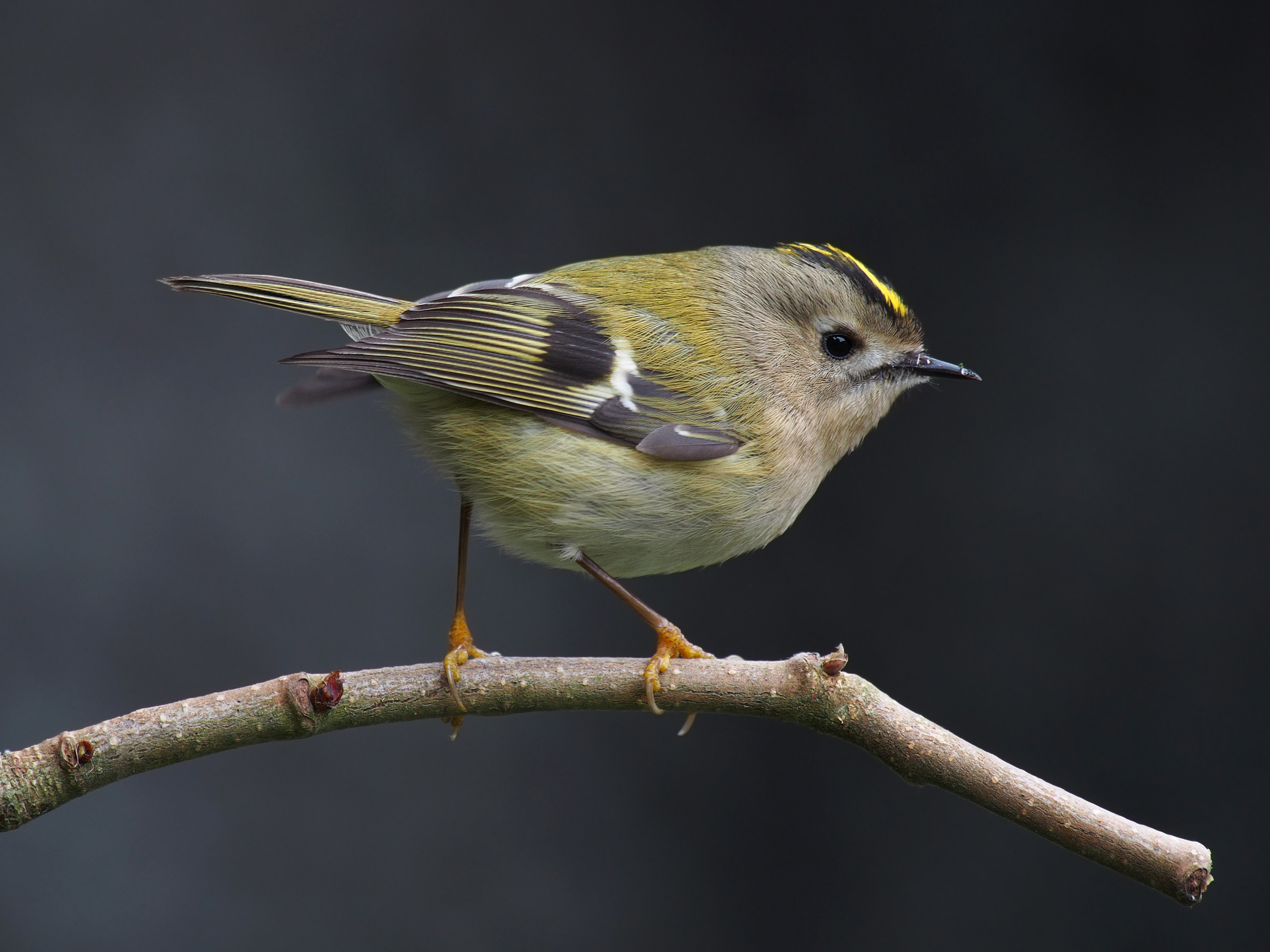
- Female R. r. regulus in Lancashire
- Male song in Surrey

Conservation status
- Least Concern (IUCN 3.1)

Scientific classification
- Kingdom: Animalia
- Phylum: Chordata
- Class: Aves
- Order: Passeriformes
- Family: Regulidae
- Genus: Regulus
- Species: R. regulus

Binomial name
- Regulus regulus (Linnaeus, 1758)
- Range of R. regulus Breeding Resident Non-breeding

Synonyms
- Motacilla regulus Linnaeus, 1758; Regulus cristatus

= Goldcrest =

Small passerine bird in the kinglet family

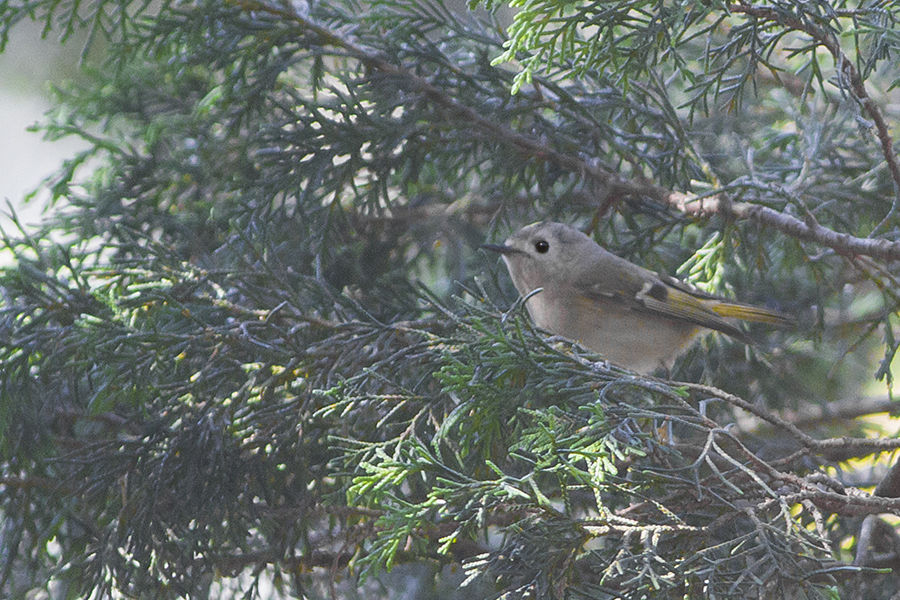
Subspecies R. r. himalayensis at Vinayak village in Uttarakhand, India

Bathing goldcrest at Utrecht in the Netherlands

The goldcrest (Regulus regulus) is a very small passerine bird in the kinglet family. Its colourful golden crest feathers, as well as being called the "king of the birds" in European folklore, gives rise to its English and scientific names. The scientific name, R. regulus, means 'petty king' or prince. Several subspecies are recognised across the very large distribution range that includes much of the Palearctic and the islands of Macaronesia and Iceland. Birds from the north and east of its breeding range migrate to winter further south.

This kinglet has greenish upper-parts, whitish under-parts, and has two white wingbars. It has a plain face contrasting black irises and a bright head crest, orange and yellow in the male and yellow in the female, which is displayed during breeding. It superficially resembles the common firecrest (Regulus ignicapilla), which largely shares its European range, but the latter's bronze shoulders and strong face pattern are distinctive. The song is a repetition of high thin notes, slightly higher-pitched than those of its relative. Birds on the Canary Islands are now separated into two subspecies of the goldcrest, but were formerly considered to be a subspecies of the firecrest or a separate species, Regulus teneriffae.

The goldcrest breeds in coniferous woodland and gardens, building its compact, three-layered nest on a tree branch. Ten to twelve eggs are incubated by the female alone, and the chicks are fed by both parents; second broods are common. This kinglet is constantly on the move as it searches for insects to eat, and in winter it is often found with flocks of tits. It may be killed by birds of prey or carry parasites, but its large range and population mean that it is not considered to present any significant conservation concerns.

== Description ==
The goldcrest is the smallest European bird, 8.5–9.5 cm (3.3–3.7 in) in length, with a 13.5–15.5 cm (5.3–6.1 in) wingspan and a weight of 4.5–7.0 g (0.16–0.25 oz). It is similar in appearance to a warbler, with olive-green upper-parts, buff-white underparts, two white wing bars, and a plain face with conspicuous black irises. The crown of the head has black sides and a narrow black front, and a bright crest, yellow with an orange centre in the male, and entirely yellow in the female; the crest is erected in display, making the distinctive orange stripe of the male much more conspicuous. The small, thin bill is black, and the legs are dark flesh-brown.

Apart from the crest colour, the sexes are alike, although in fresh plumage, the female may have very slightly paler upper-parts and greyer underparts than the adult male. The juvenile is similar to the adult, but has duller upper-parts and lacks the coloured crown. Although the tail and flight feathers may be retained into the first winter, by then the young birds are almost indistinguishable from adults in the field. The flight is distinctive; it consists of whirring wing-beats with occasional sudden changes of direction. Shorter flights while feeding are a mix of dashing and fluttering with frequent hovering. It moves restlessly among foliage, regularly creeping on branches and up and down trunks.

=== Identification ===
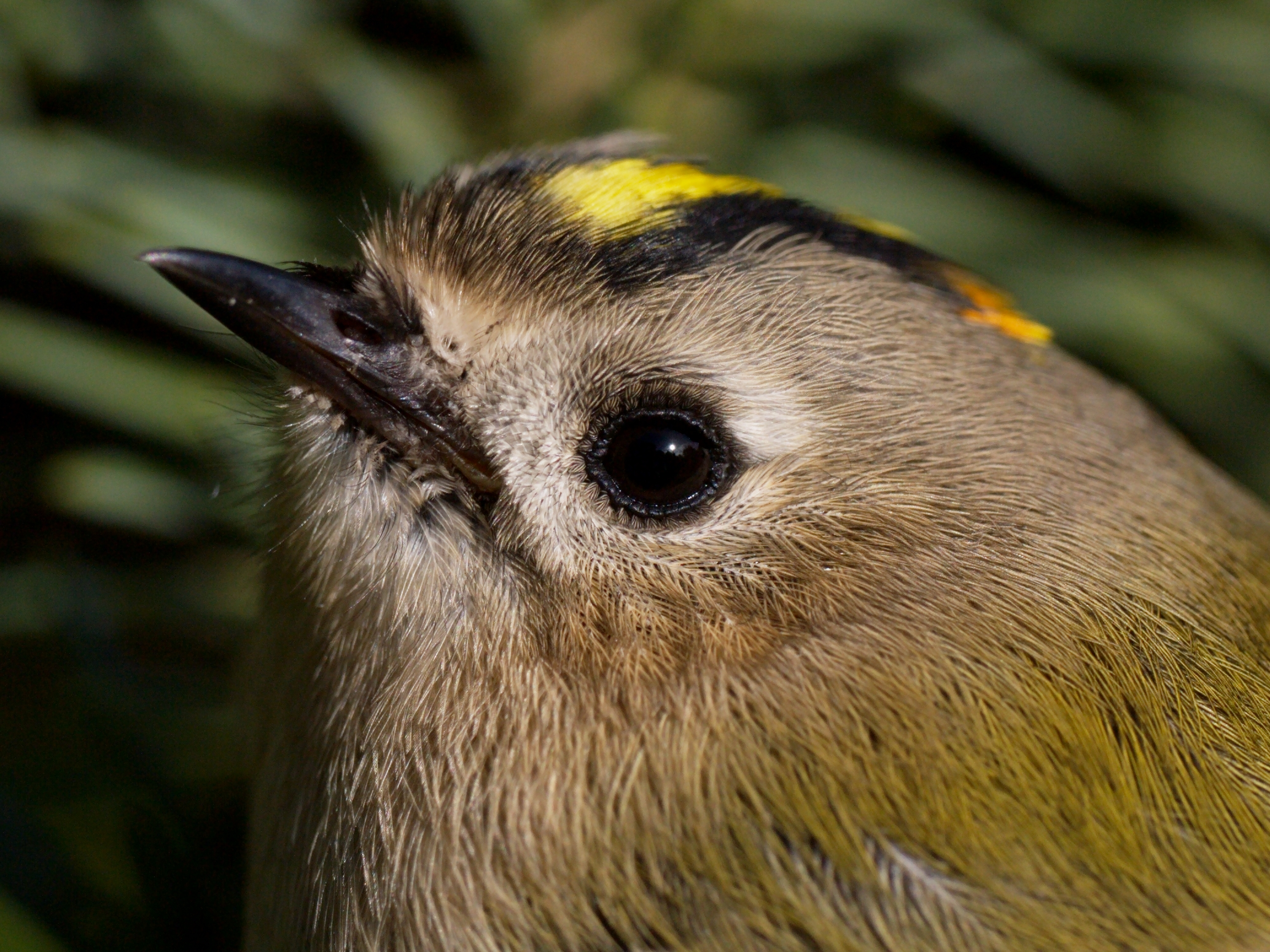
The nominate subspecies, R. r. regulus, in Belgium. The goldcrest has a bright crest and a relatively plain face. The orange tinge of the hindcrown indicates that this is a male.

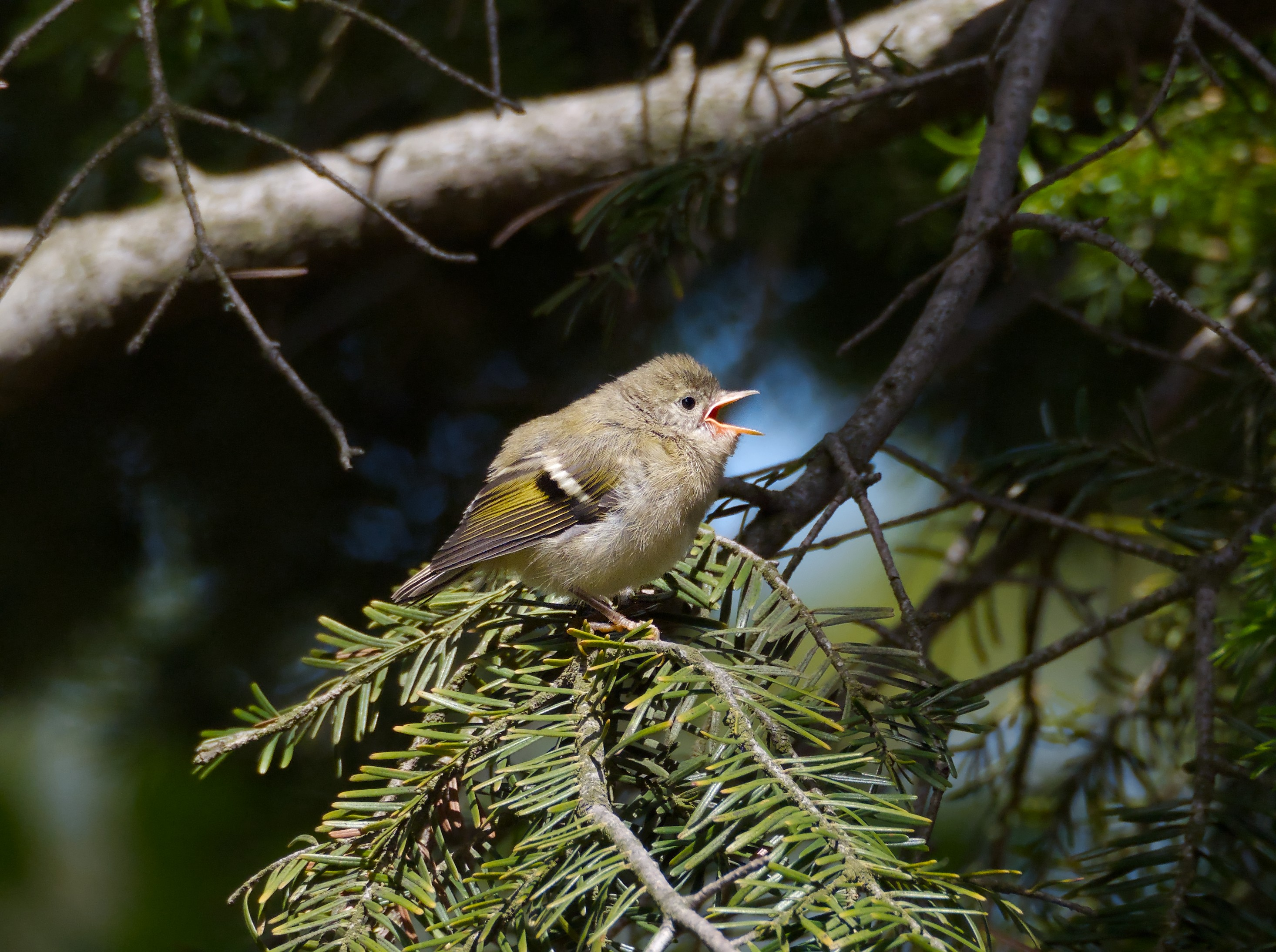
A juvenile goldcrest in Poland. The head does not yet show the coloured crown and the beak is brighter than in adults.

The goldcrest is usually easily distinguished from other small birds in its range, but poor views could possibly lead to confusion with the common firecrest or yellow-browed warbler. The adult common firecrest has a distinguishing face pattern showing a bright white supercilium (eyebrow) and black eye-stripe, and the juvenile usually shows enough of this face pattern to be readily distinguished from the plain-faced goldcrest. The yellow-browed warbler has a yellowish supercilium and pale crown stripe, so also shows a different head pattern.

The ruby-crowned kinglet, an American Regulus species and a potential vagrant in Europe, could be more difficult to distinguish. It has a plain face like its Old World cousin, but the male has a red crest without any yellow or a black border. Female and juvenile ruby-crowned kinglets lack the ruby-red crown patch, but compared with the similarly crestless juvenile goldcrest, the American bird is larger in size, has an obvious whitish eyering, and yellowish wing bars.

== Voice ==
Song of the male goldcrest, near Camberley

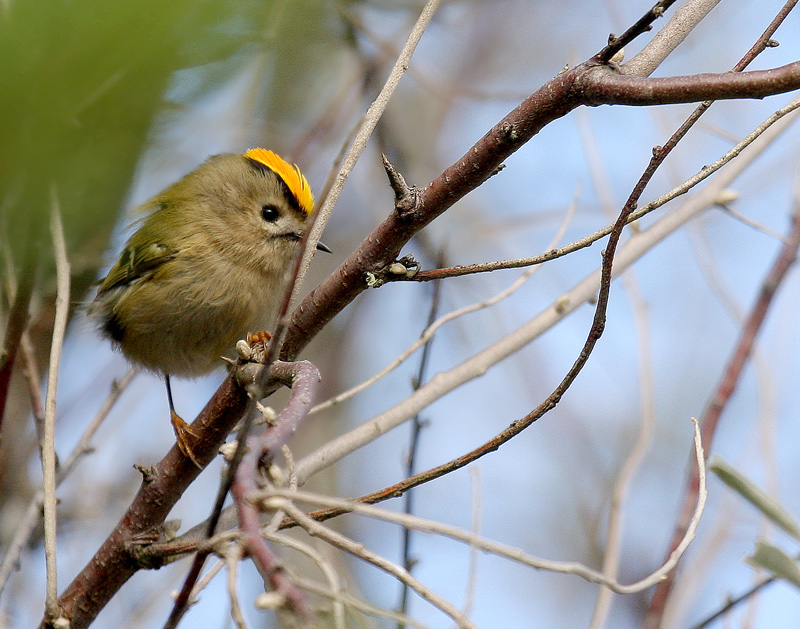
Male in France displaying orange crest feathers that are set within a narrow rim of yellow feathers

The typical contact call of the goldcrest is a thin, high-pitched zee given at intervals of 1–4 seconds, with all the notes at the same pitch. It sometimes has a more clipped ending, or is delivered more rapidly. The call is higher and less rough than that of the firecrest. The song of the male goldcrest is a very high, thin double note cedar, repeated 5–7 times and ending in a flourish, cedarcedar-cedar-cedar-cedar-stichi-see-pee. The entire song lasts 3–4 seconds and is repeated 5–7 times a minute. This song, often uttered while the male is foraging, can be heard in most months of the year. There is also a subdued rambling subsong. Male goldcrests sometimes show a territorial response to recordings of the songs or calls of the common firecrest, but the reverse is apparently not true, since the songs of the common firecrest are simpler in construction than those of its relatives.

The songs of mainland goldcrests vary only slightly across their range and consist of a single song type, but much more divergence has occurred in the isolated Macaronesian populations. Not only are there variations between islands and within an island, but individual males on the Azores can have up to three song types. The dialects on the Azores fall into two main groups, neither of which elicited a response from male European goldcrests in playback experiments. There are also two main dialect groups on the Canary islands, a widespread group similar to the European version, and another that is restricted to the mountains of Tenerife. The song variations have been used to investigate the colonisation pattern of the Macaronesian islands by goldcrests, and identified a previously unknown subspecies.

== Taxonomy ==
The kinglets are a small group of birds sometimes included in the Old World warblers, but frequently given family status, especially as recent research shows that despite superficial similarities, they are phylogenetically remote from the warblers. The names of the family Regulidae, and the genus Regulus, are derived from the Latin regulus, a diminutive of rex, a king. The goldcrest was first described by Carl Linnaeus in his Systema Naturae in 1758 as Motacilla regulus (characterised as [Motacilla] remigibus secundariis exteriori margine flavis, medio albis). It was moved to the warbler genus Sylvia by English naturalist John Latham in 1790, and to its current genus by French zoologist Georges Cuvier in 1800.

The relationships of the flamecrest or Taiwan firecrest (Regulus goodfellowi) of Taiwan have also been a source of much debate. It is sometimes viewed as a race of firecrest, but its territorial song resembles those of the Himalayan races of goldcrest, and genetic data show that it is the closest relative of that species, and, despite its alternative name, only distantly related to the firecrest. The flamecrest diverged from the goldcrest 3.0–3.1 mya (million years ago).

=== Subspecies ===
==== Continental Eurasia ====
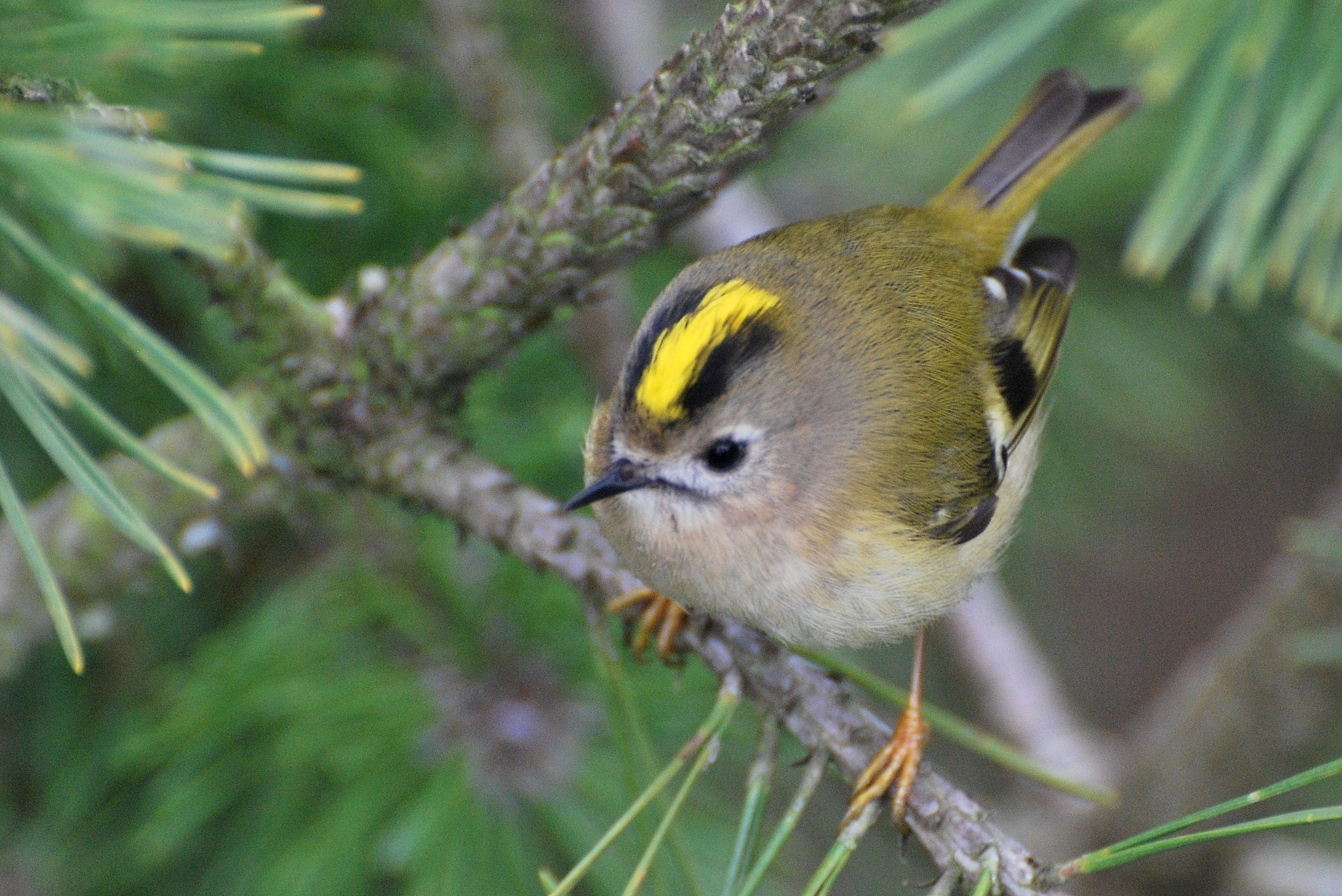
Female R. r. regulus in England

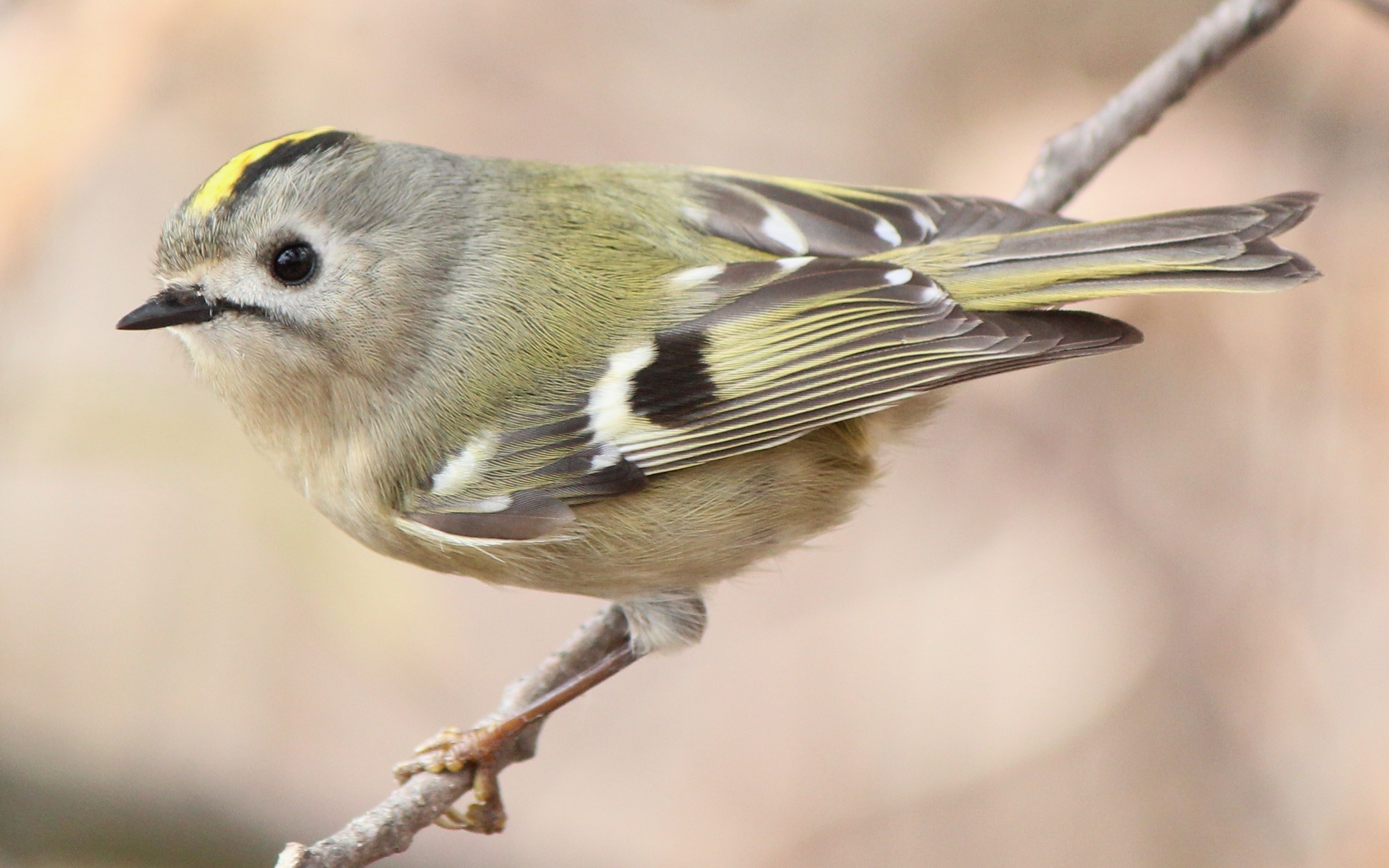
R. r. japonensis in Japan

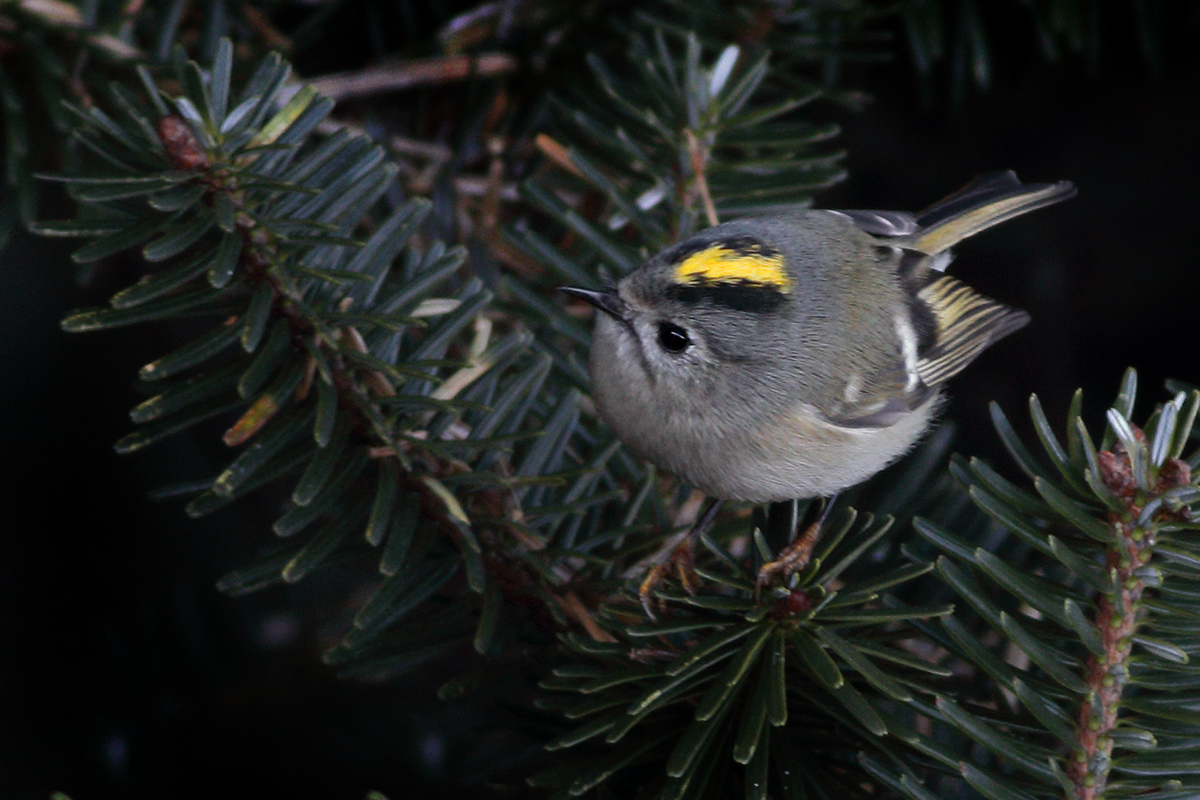
R. r. sikkimensis from Pangolakha Wildlife Sanctuary in Sikkim, India.

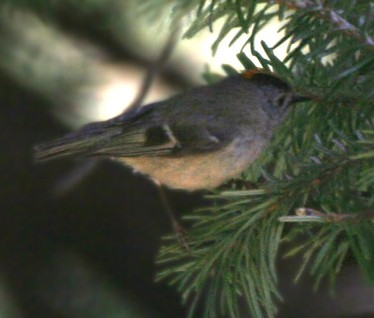
Probable male R. r. himalayensis has paler underparts than the European race.

Several subspecies of the goldcrest have been described. In continental Eurasia, there are nine generally accepted and very similar subspecies, differing only in details such as plumage shade. At the genetic level, the two Central Asian forms, R. r. sikkimensis and R. r. himalayensis, are very close to each other, and have differentiated only in the recent past, but they diverged from the western subspecies around 2.8 mya.

- R. r. regulus (Linnaeus, 1758). Breeds in most of Europe; this is the nominate subspecies.
- R. r. himalayensis (Bonaparte, 1856). Breeds in the Himalayas; it is similar to the nominate subspecies, but slightly paler above and with whiter underparts.
- R. r. japonensis (Blakiston, 1862). Breeds in Eastern Asia, including Japan, Korea, China and Siberia; it is greener and has darker upper-parts than the nominate form, and has broad white wingbars.
- R. r. tristis (Pleske, 1892). Breeds in China and Central Asia, wintering in northeastern Afghanistan. Records of this race from Ladakh claimed by Meinertzhagen are considered to be fraudulent. It is distinctive, with the black edges to the crest largely absent. The crown of the male is yellower than in other forms, and the underparts are much duller and greyer.
- R. r. coatsi (Sushkin, 1904). Breeds in Russia and Central Asia, and is paler above than the nominate subspecies.
- R. r. yunnanensis (Rippon, 1906). Breeds in the Eastern Himalayas, Burma and China; it is like R. r. sikkimensis, but darker overall with dark green upper-parts and darker buff underparts.
- R. r. hyrcanus (Zarudny, 1910). Breeds only in Iran; it is like R. r. buturlini, but slightly darker.
- R. r. buturlini (Loudon, 1911). Breeds in Eastern Europe, the Caucasus and Central Asia. It is paler above than the nominate subspecies, and greyish-green rather than olive.
- R. r. sikkimensis (Meinertzhagen R. & Meinertzhagen A., 1926). Breeds in India and China. It is darker than R. r. himalayensis, and greener than the nominate subspecies.

==== The Atlantic islands ====
Two groups of goldcrest taxa are found on the Atlantic islands of Macaronesia. Birds on the Canary Islands are ancient colonists, whereas those on the Azores are of more recent origin. There are no goldcrests on Madeira, where the Madeira firecrest is the only Regulus species.

The Canary Islands were colonised in two waves. The first step was the occupation of Tenerife and La Gomera 1.9–2.3 million years ago, followed by a separate invasion of El Hierro and La Palma 1.3–1.8 mya.

Birds from the Canary Islands are particularly distinctive having a black forehead, pink-buff underparts and a darker closed wing, and have been sometimes treated either as a subspecies of the common firecrest or as a different Regulus species altogether. They were sometimes called the Tenerife goldcrest, no matter which of the islands they lived on; however, a 2006 study of the vocalisations of these birds indicate that they actually comprise two subspecies of the goldcrest that are separable on voice; R. r. teneriffae occurring on Tenerife and the newly described subspecies, R. r. ellenthalerae, the western Canary Islands goldcrest, occurring on the smaller islands of La Palma and El Hierro.

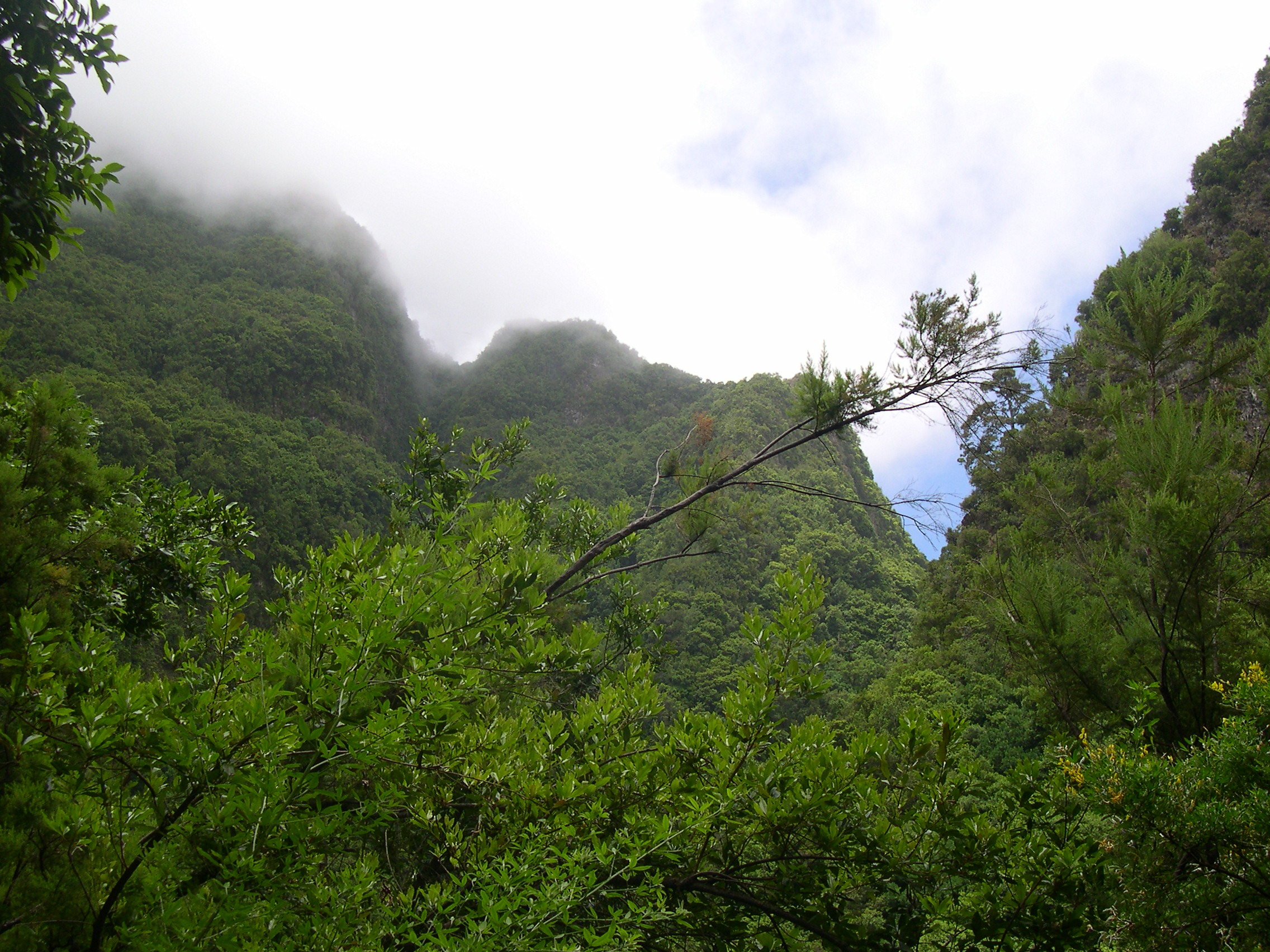
The recently discovered subspecies R. r. ellenthalerae occurs in laurisilva forest on La Palma (above) and El Hierro in the Canary Islands.

- Tenerife goldcrest R. r. teneriffae (Seebohm, 1883). Found on Tenerife and La Gomera, Canary Islands; it is a distinctive, small subspecies with a black forehead and pink-buff underparts.
- Western Canary Islands goldcrest R. r. ellenthalerae (Päckert et al., 2006). Resident on La Palma and El Hierro, Canary Islands.

Differences in songs, genetics and morphology suggests that the Azores were colonised in a single invasion in the late Pleistocene, about 100,000 years ago. It is likely that the initial colonisation was of the easternmost islands, with a subsequent spread to the central and western island groups from the western caldera of São Miguel, where both eastern and western song types are found.

- Sao Miguel Goldcrest R. r. azoricus (Seebohm, 1883). Found only on São Miguel, Azores; it is like R. r. inermis, except the underparts are more olive-buff.
- Western Azores goldcrest R. r. inermis (Murphy & Chapin, 1929). Resident on Flores, Faial, Terceira, São Jorge and Pico, Azores; its upper-parts are a darker olive-green than those of the nominate form, and the underparts are also darker.
- Santa Maria goldcrest R. r. sanctaemariae (Vaurie, 1954). Found only on Santa Maria Island (Azores); it is paler than other Azores subspecies and whitish below.

=== Fossils ===
There are a few Pleistocene (2.6 million to 12,000 years BP) records from Europe of extant Regulus species, mostly goldcrests or unidentifiable to species. The only fossil of an extinct Regulus is a left ulna from 2.6 to 1.95 mya in Bulgaria, which was identified as belonging to an extinct species, Regulus bulgaricus. The goldcrest lineage diverged from this apparent ancestor of the common firecrest in the Middle Pleistocene.

== Distribution and habitat ==
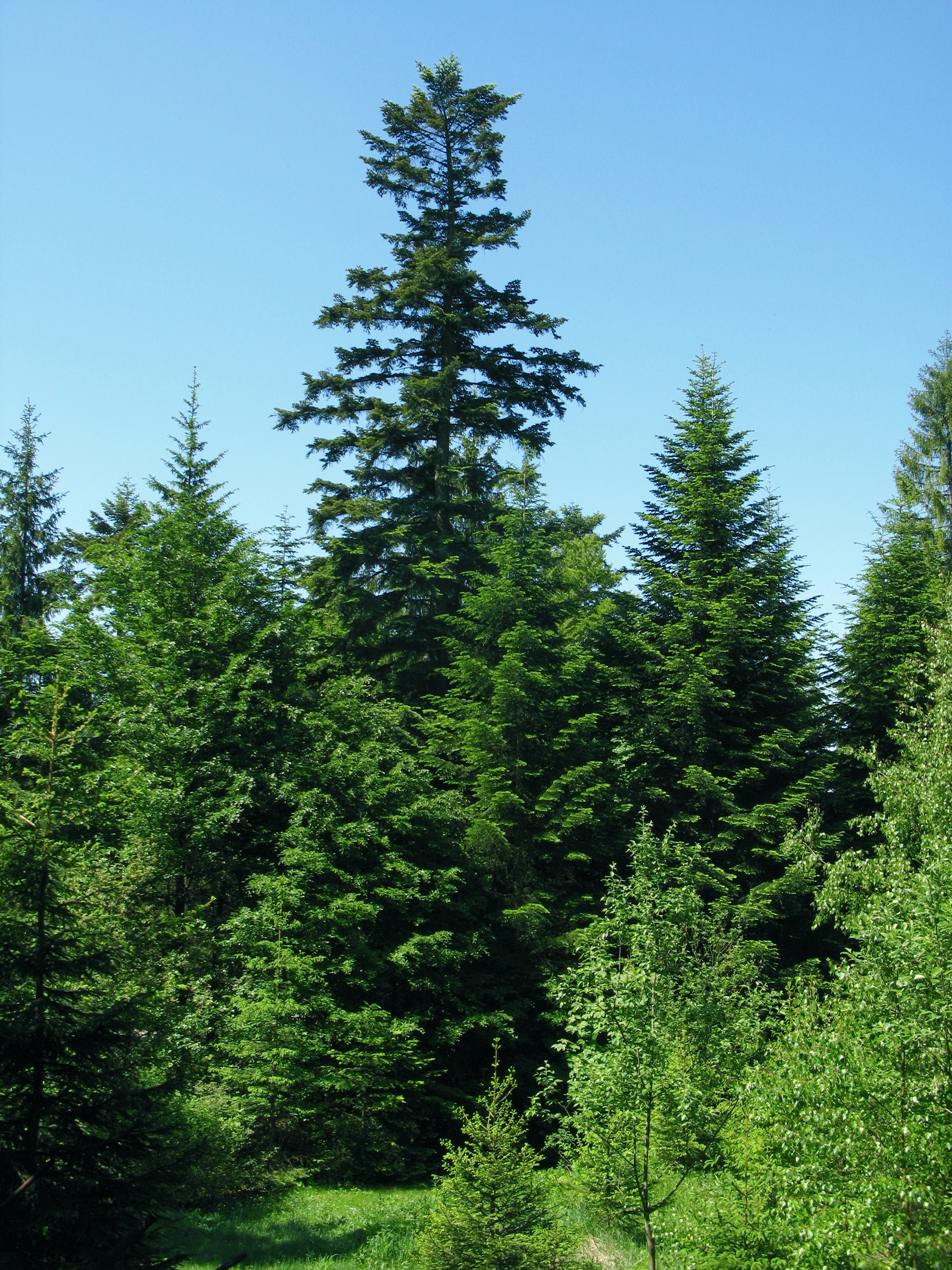
The silver fir, a favoured nesting tree

The goldcrest breeds in mature lowland and mountain coniferous woodlands, mainly up to 3,000 m (9,800 ft), and occasionally to 4,800 m (15,700 ft). It uses spruce, larch, Scots pine, silver fir and mountain pine, and in man-made landscapes also introduced conifers such as douglas fir. Breeding densities of up to 591 pairs per square km (1,530 pairs per square mile) have been recorded in Norway spruce in Ireland, and goldcrests constituted over 60% of all birds found in Welsh Douglas fir and Norway spruce plantations. Broad-leaved woods are used only when some spruce or firs are also present. Sites such as parks and cemeteries are used only when they offer suitable conifers that are not otherwise locally available. The height and nature of any undergrowth is irrelevant.

Unlike more specialised birds such as the Eurasian nuthatch and the Eurasian treecreeper, both of which forage on tree trunks, the kinglets do not need large woodlands, and their population density is independent of forest size. Once breeding is over, this species will readily move into deciduous trees and shrubs, heathland and similar more open habitats.

The Tenerife subspecies occurs in the mountain region previously occupied by laurisilva, but now dominated by tree heaths. It is common only in that habitat, becoming rare in pine forest, where it occurs only where tree-heath is also available.

The goldcrest has a huge range in Eurasia, breeding from Macaronesia to Japan. It is common in middle and northern temperate and boreal latitudes of Europe, between the 13–24 °C (55–75 °F) July isotherms, and thus predominantly in cooler climates than the firecrest. Further east it occurs discontinuously through southern Siberia to Sakhalin and Japan, in the Tian Shan mountains, northern Iran, and from the Himalayas east to central China.

This species has bred in Iceland since about 1999, and was widespread by 2004, although numbers are affected by hard winters. Breeding occurs intermittently in the Faroes. The goldcrest has occurred as a vagrant in Jordan and Morocco.

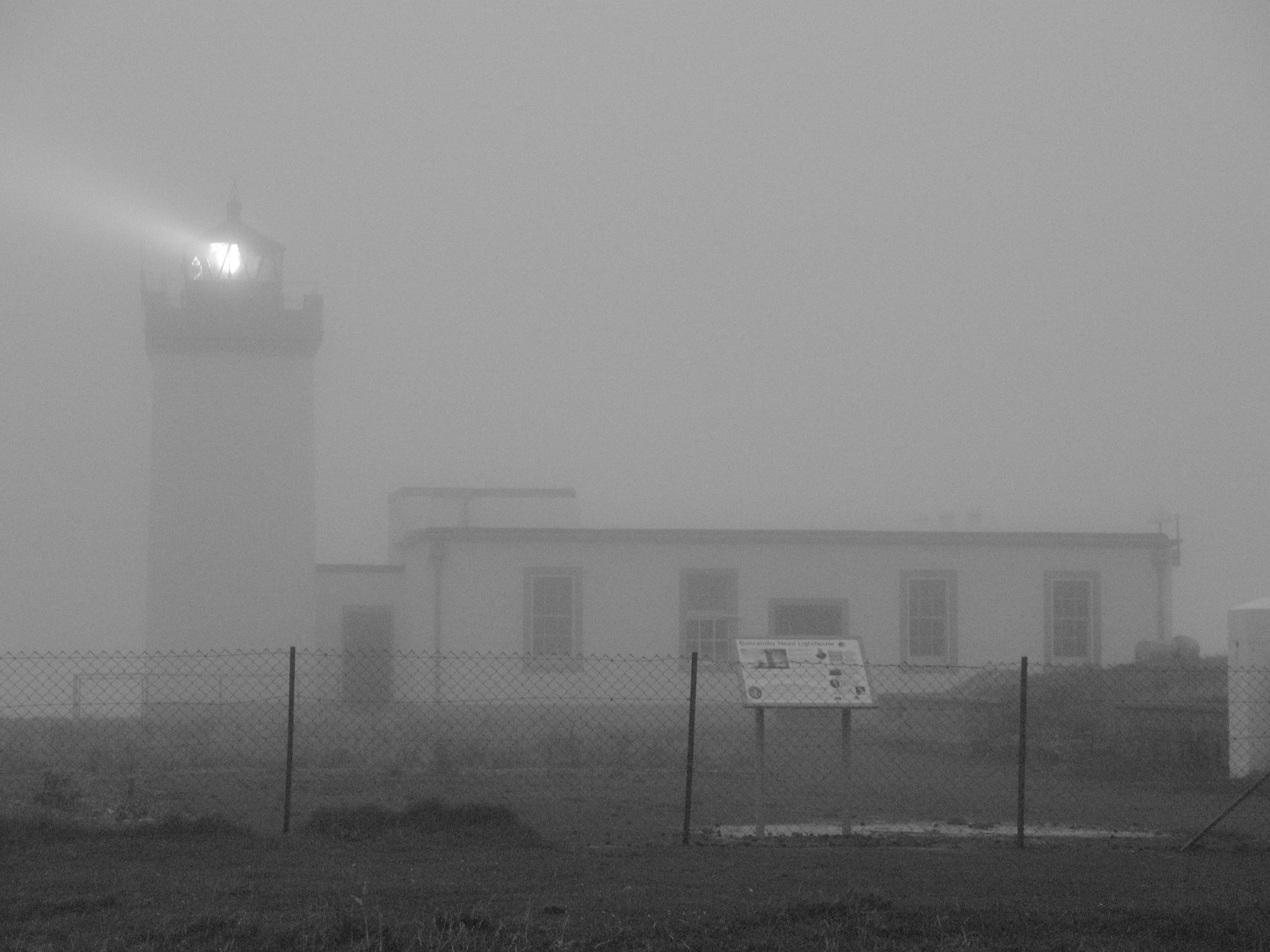
On foggy or overcast nights, goldcrests and other disorientated migrants can be attracted to lighthouses in large numbers.

This species is partly migratory, northernmost populations deserting their breeding areas in winter. Birds winter in Europe and Asia south of the breeding range. Birds in northern Fennoscandia and Russia vacate their territories between late August and early November, with most leaving in late September to mid-October as the first cold weather arrives. Adverse conditions may lead to disorientation, large numbers gathering on ships on overcast or wet nights. Large influxes include 15,000 birds on the Isle of May in October 1982, and nearly 21,000 birds through a single site in Latvia during September and October 1983. Spring migration is complete by late March on the Mediterranean islands, but continues to late April or early May in northern Europe. The spring passage is much lighter than in autumn, suggesting high mortality on migration.

A study in the Baltic region showed that northern goldcrests were more likely to migrate, and increased their body mass beforehand; non-migratory southern birds did not increase their fat reserves. The travel speed of migrating goldcrests increased for those leaving later in the autumn, and was greater for the northernmost populations. Migration was faster on routes that crossed the Baltic Sea than on coastal routes, and the birds with the largest fat reserves travelled at the highest speeds. The ability to lay down fat is adversely affected in this tiny bird by poor health. In Hungary, goldcrests stopping temporarily on migration were mostly found in scrub, including blackthorn, hawthorn and pear, which provided some protection from sparrowhawks. Females migrated slightly earlier than males, but overall there were more males, with an average sex ratio of 1.6:1. Goldcrests can fly 250–800 km (160–500 mi) in one day, although they keep at a lower level in heavy headwinds. This is a tame and inquisitive bird, and tired migrants will land near or on humans, sometimes searching for food on their clothing.

The North Atlantic oscillation is an atmospheric phenomenon affecting the weather in Western Europe. When the atmospheric pressure variations in the North Atlantic are large, the springs in Europe are warmer. This brings forward the northward migration of those bird species (including the goldcrest) that winter mainly within western or southern Europe. A general climatic change resulting in more frequent positive North Atlantic oscillation events has led to earlier spring migration of these short-distance migrants since the 1980s. The warmer spring weather brings on plant growth, thus preparing the habitat for returning migrants. The effect is greatest in western and central Europe.

== Behaviour ==
=== Breeding ===
The goldcrest is monogamous. The male sings during the breeding season, usually while foraging rather than from a perch. It has a display involving bowing its head towards another bird and raising the coloured crest. Firecrests will sometimes defend their territories against goldcrests, but the amount of actual competition between the species may not be very great. A Spanish study suggested that territorial conflicts between species, and other phenomena like males singing mixed or alternating songs, were most frequent when one species locally far outnumbered the other; in other circumstances, the two species learned to ignore each other's songs. However, in very small areas of conifers it is rare for the goldcrest and the firecrest to share territories; either one or the other is present, but not both. A male goldcrest will defend his territory against either species, sometimes including some firecrest phrases in his song.

The goldcrest's nest is a well-insulated cup-shaped structure built in three layers. The nest's outer layer is made from moss, small twigs, cobwebs and lichen, the cobwebs also being used to attach the nest to the thin branches that support it. The middle layer is moss, which is lined by an inner layer of feathers and hair. The nest is larger, shallower and less compact than that of the firecrest, with an internal diameter of about 9.0 cm (3.5 in), and is constructed by both sexes, although the female does most of the work. It is often suspended from a hanging branch, usually at no great height, although Eric Simms reported nests at heights from 1.0–22 m (3.3–72.2 ft). One pair built their nest just 1.0 m (3.3 ft) above that of a sparrowhawk.

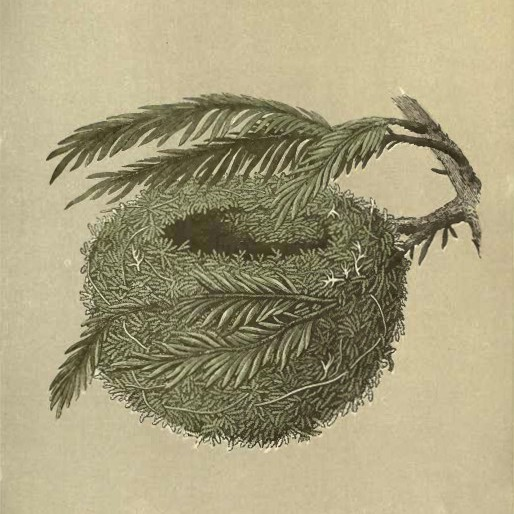
Old drawing of a nest and small branches of a conifer tree

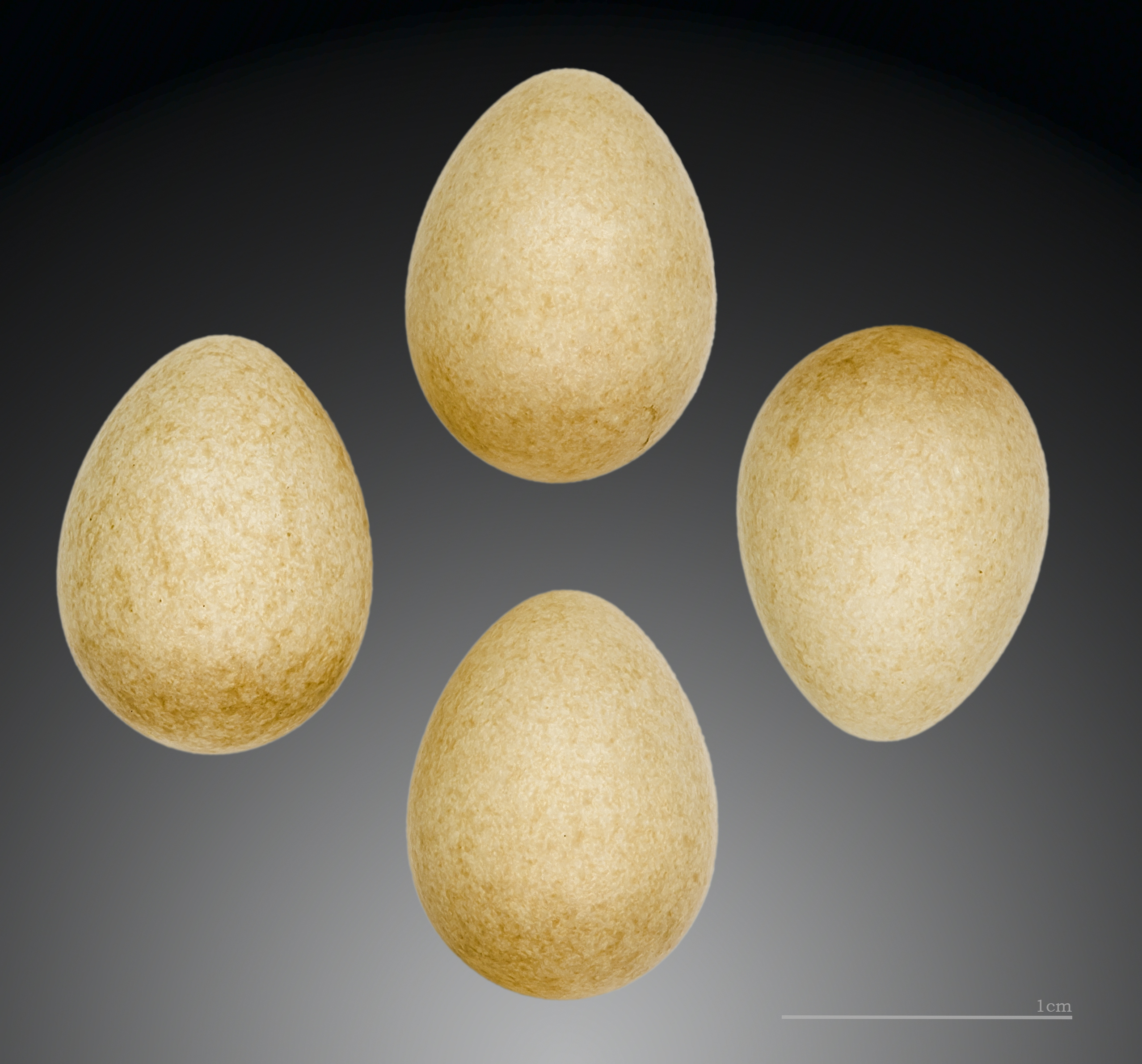
Regulus regulus regulus – MHNT

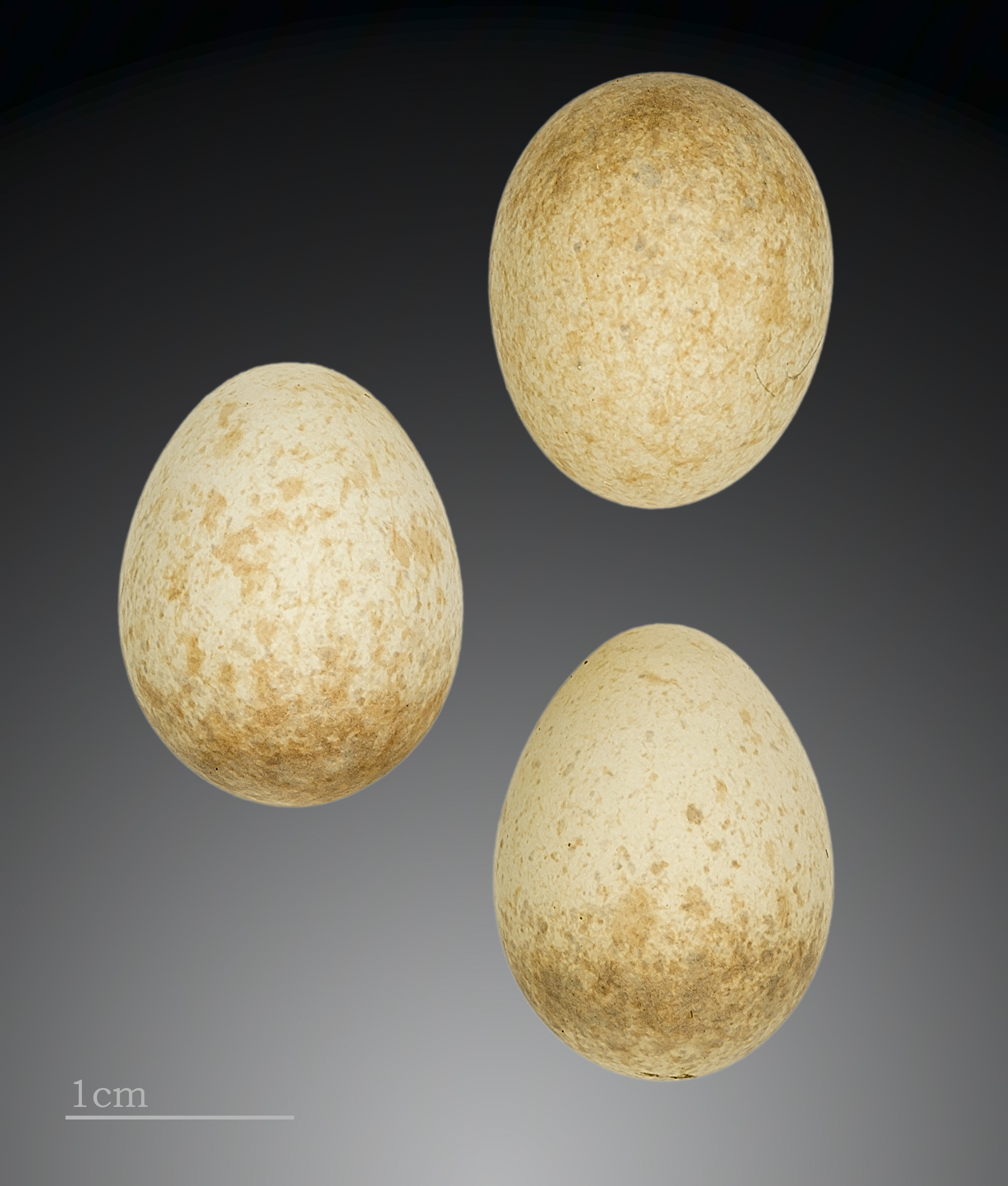
Regulus regulus azoricus – MHNT

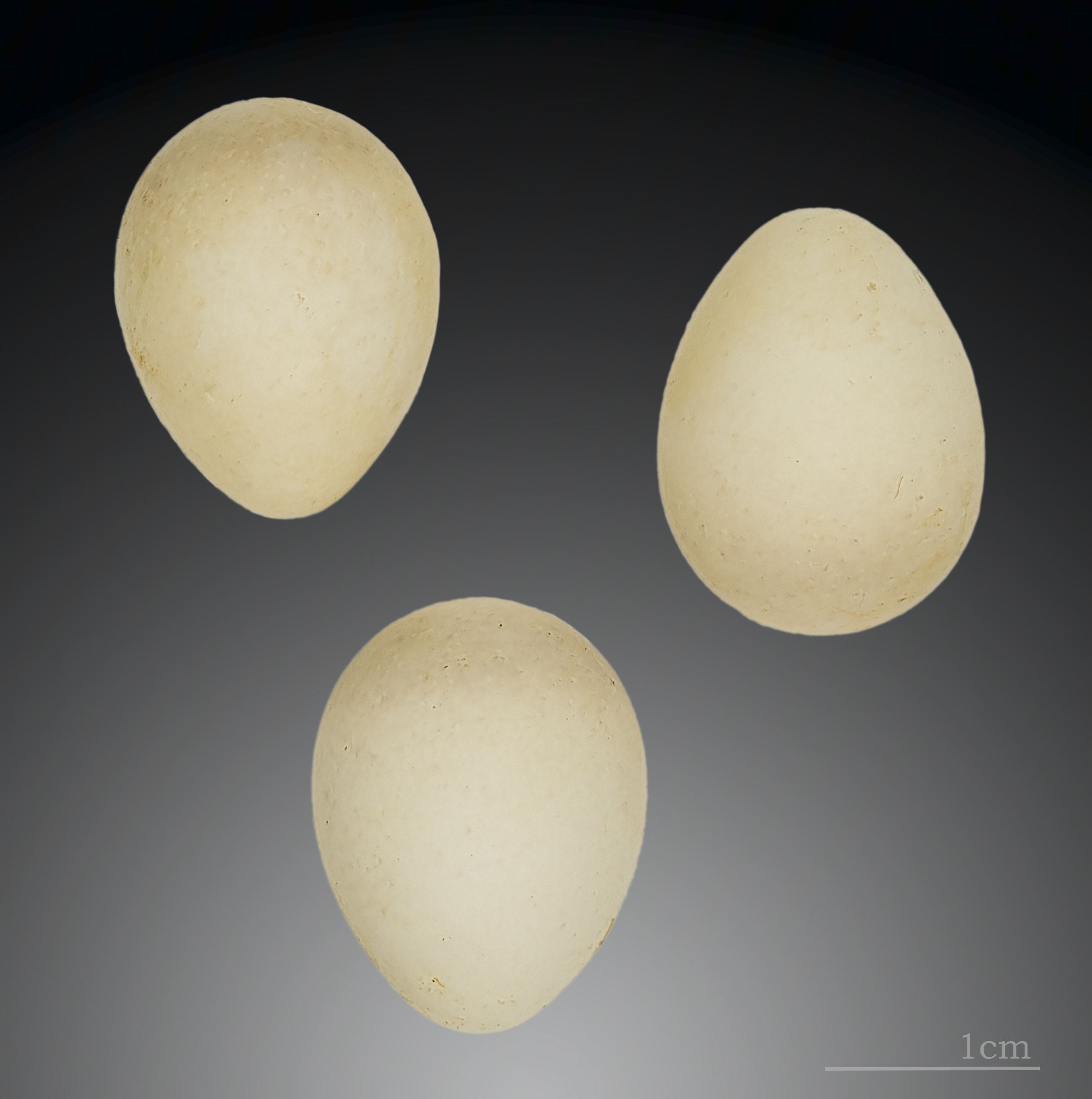
Regulus regulus inermis – MHNT

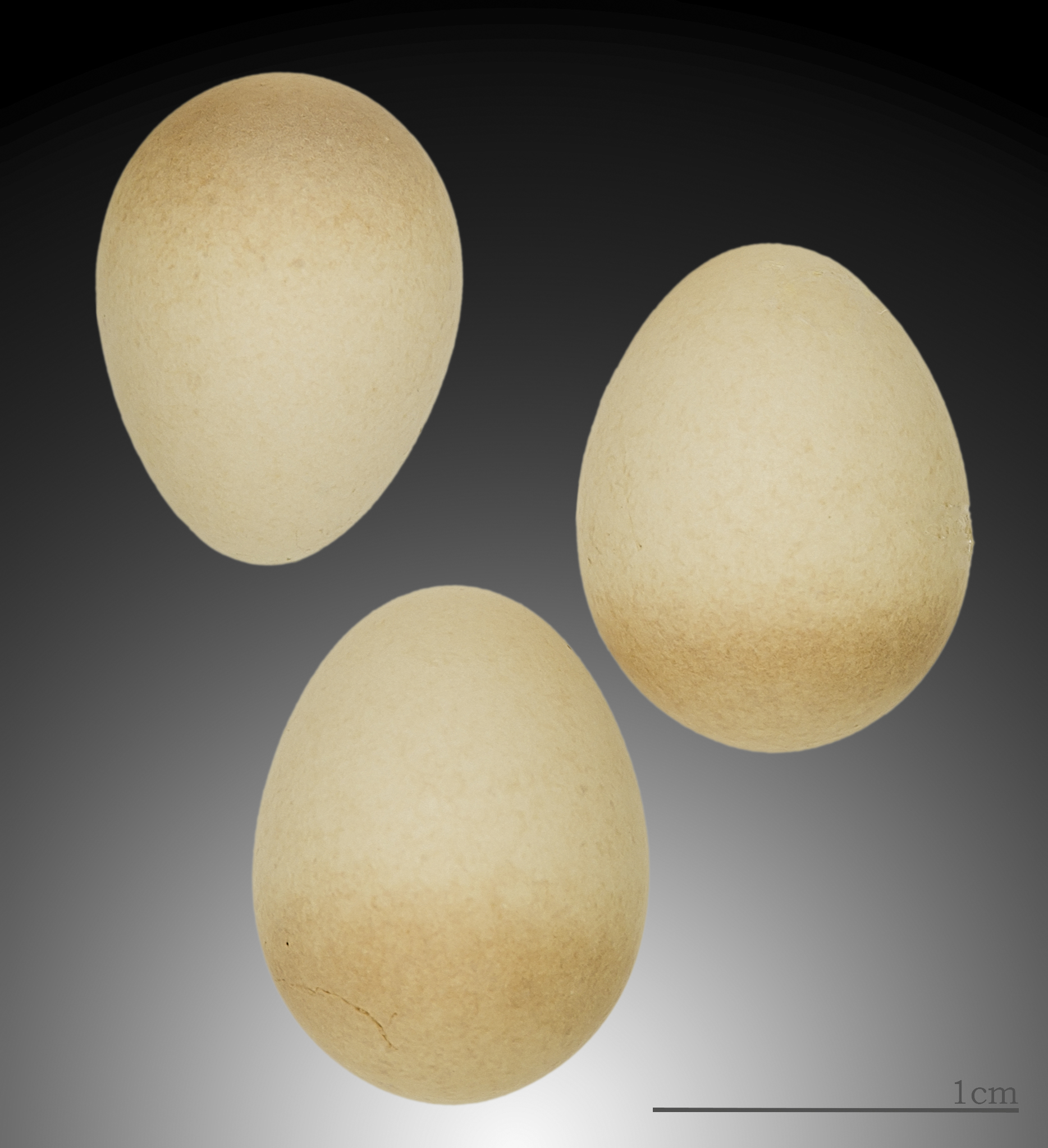
Regulus regulus teneriffae – MHNT

Laying starts at the end of April into early May. The eggs are whitish with very indistinct buff, grey or brown markings at the broad end. The eggs are 14 mm × 10 mm (0.55 in × 0.39 in) and weigh 0.8 g (0.028 oz), of which 5% is shell. The clutch size in Europe is typically nine to 11 eggs, but ranges from six to 13. The eggs are piled up in the nest and the female keeps the eggs warm with her brood patch and also by putting her warm legs into the middle of the pile between the eggs. Within a clutch the size of eggs increases gradually and the last laid egg may be 20% larger than the first egg. Second clutches, which are common, are laid usually while the first nest still has young. The male builds the second nest, then feeds the young in the first nest while the female is incubating in the second; when the first brood has fledged, he joins the female in feeding the second brood. The female goldcrest is not normally fed by her mate while incubating. She is a tight sitter, reluctant to leave the nest when disturbed, and has been recorded as continuing to attend the nest when it has been moved, or even when it is being held.

The eggs are maintained at 36.5 °C (97.7 °F), the female regulating the temperature of the eggs by varying the time spent sitting. She leaves the nest more with increasing air temperature, and incubates more tightly when the light intensity is lower early and late in the day. The female incubates the eggs for 16 to 19 days to hatching, and broods the chicks, which fledge in a further 17 to 22 days later. Both parents feed the chicks and fledged young, and in very hot weather, the female has been noted as taking drops of water to her chicks in her bill. This species becomes sexually mature after one year, and has an annual adult mortality of over 80 per cent giving a life expectancy of around eight months, which is the shortest for any bird apart from a few Coturnix species. There are nonetheless records of an individual surviving to 4 years 10 months, and even a report of a bird ringed in Winchester in the UK in 1989 and found dead in Morocco 7 years and 7 months later.

Although their ranges overlap substantially, hybridisation between goldcrests and firecrests seems to be prevented by differences in courtship rituals and different facial patterns. Even in aviary studies in which a female goldcrest was given an artificial eyestripe to facilitate mating with a male firecrest, the chicks were never raised by the mixed pair, and appeared to be poorly adapted compared to the parent species.

=== Feeding ===
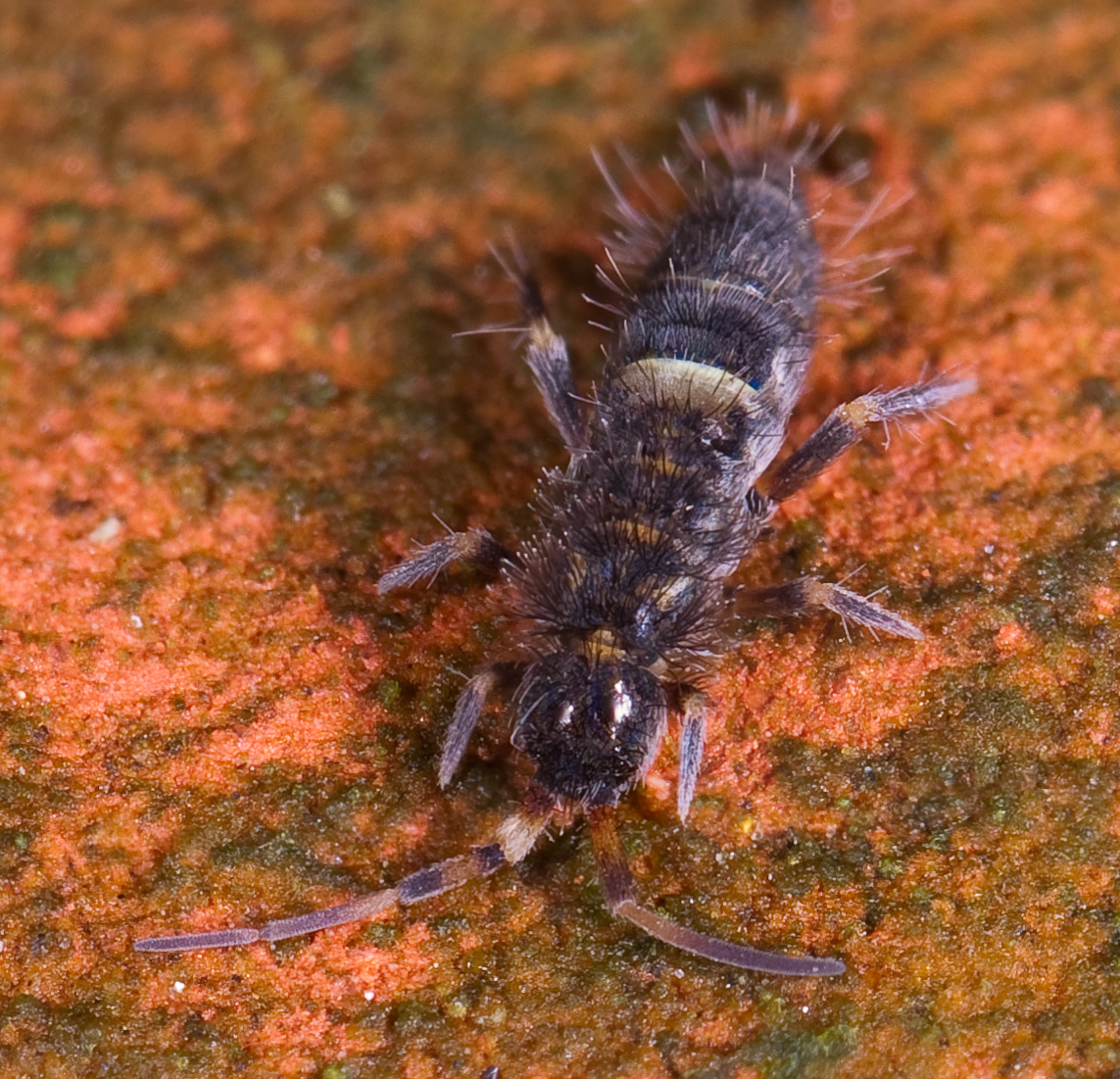
Springtails are a major dietary item

All Regulus species are almost exclusively insectivorous, preying on small arthropods with soft cuticles, such as springtails, aphids and spiders. They also feed on the cocoons and eggs of spiders and insects, and occasionally take pollen. All species will catch flying insects while hovering. Although the similarly sized goldcrest and firecrest are often found together, there are a number of factors that minimise direct competition for food. Goldcrests prefer smaller prey than common firecrests. Although both will take trapped insects from spider webs on autumn migration, firecrests will also eat the large orb-web spiders (on rare occasions kinglets have been found stuck in a spider web, either unable to move or dead).

The goldcrest takes a wide variety of prey, especially spiders, caterpillars, bugs, springtails and flies. Larger prey such as oak bush crickets and tortrix moths may sometimes be taken. Flying insects are taken in hovering flight but not normally pursued; there is a record of a goldcrest attacking a large dragonfly in flight, only to be dragged along by the insect before releasing it unharmed. Goldcrests will occasionally feed on the ground among leaf-litter with tits. Non-animal food is rare, although goldcrests have been seen drinking sap from broken birch twigs together with tits and nuthatches.

The goldcrest feeds in trees, frequently foraging on the undersides of branches and leaves. This is in contrast to the common firecrest, which mainly exploits the upper surface of branches in coniferous habitat and of leaves in deciduous trees. In winter, flocks of goldcrests cover a given distance at only one-third of the speed of common firecrests, taking the smallest prey items ignored by their relative. The differences in behaviour are facilitated by subtle morphological differences; firecrests have broader bills with longer rictal bristles (which protect a bird's eye from food items it is trying to capture), and these features reflect the larger prey taken by the species. The firecrest's less forked tail may reflect its longer episodes of hovering while hunting. Firecrests forage more often while on foot, and have a foot better adapted for perching, whereas the goldcrest's longer hind toe reflects its habit of moving vertically along branches while feeding. It also has deep furrows in the soles of its feet capable of gripping individual needles, while firecrests have a smoother surface.

The goldcrest has much the same range and habitat preference as the common chiffchaff, and there is some evidence that high breeding densities of the kinglet depress the population of the warbler, although the converse is not true. There is no evidence that the species compete for territories, and in any case the chiffchaff is 50% heavier than the goldcrest. Nevertheless, there are 1.5 million breeding pairs of goldcrests in Finland, compared with 0.4 million breeding pairs of chiffchaffs, and only the kinglet has increased in numbers as the area of spruce woodland in the country has expanded. The goldcrest may be out-competing the warbler for food, especially as the larger bird faces more competition from other insectivores, including other Phylloscopus warblers. Both birds occur in similar forests, but the chiffchaff is found within 100 m (330 ft) of the forest edge, with the goldcrest breeding deeper in the woodland. Nevertheless, there is no conclusive evidence that the decline of the chiffchaff subspecies Phylloscopus collybita abietinus in parts of Finland is due to competition with the willow warbler and goldcrest.

Outside the breeding season, small groups of goldcrests maintain exclusive winter feeding territories, which they defend against neighbouring groups. As they roam around their territory, they frequently join loose flocks of other wanderers such as tits and warblers. This kinglet, like other species that prefer mixed-species foraging flocks in winter, hunts over a greater range of heights and vegetation types than when feeding alone. For species that tend to feed in flocks, foraging success while in a flock was about twice that for solitary birds. A consequence of feeding in a flock is that foraging sites may be restricted to avoid competition with other species. In a Swedish study, coal tits and goldcrests foraged in the outer foliage, while the larger willow and crested tits used the inner canopy. In sites where the numbers of willow and crested tits was artificially reduced, goldcrests and coal tits extended their foraging to include the inner canopy, but did not do so where the larger tits were retained. In some areas, wintering birds have developed the habit of coming to feeding stations and bird tables to take fat, sometimes with warblers such as the common chiffchaff and blackcap.

=== Winter survival ===
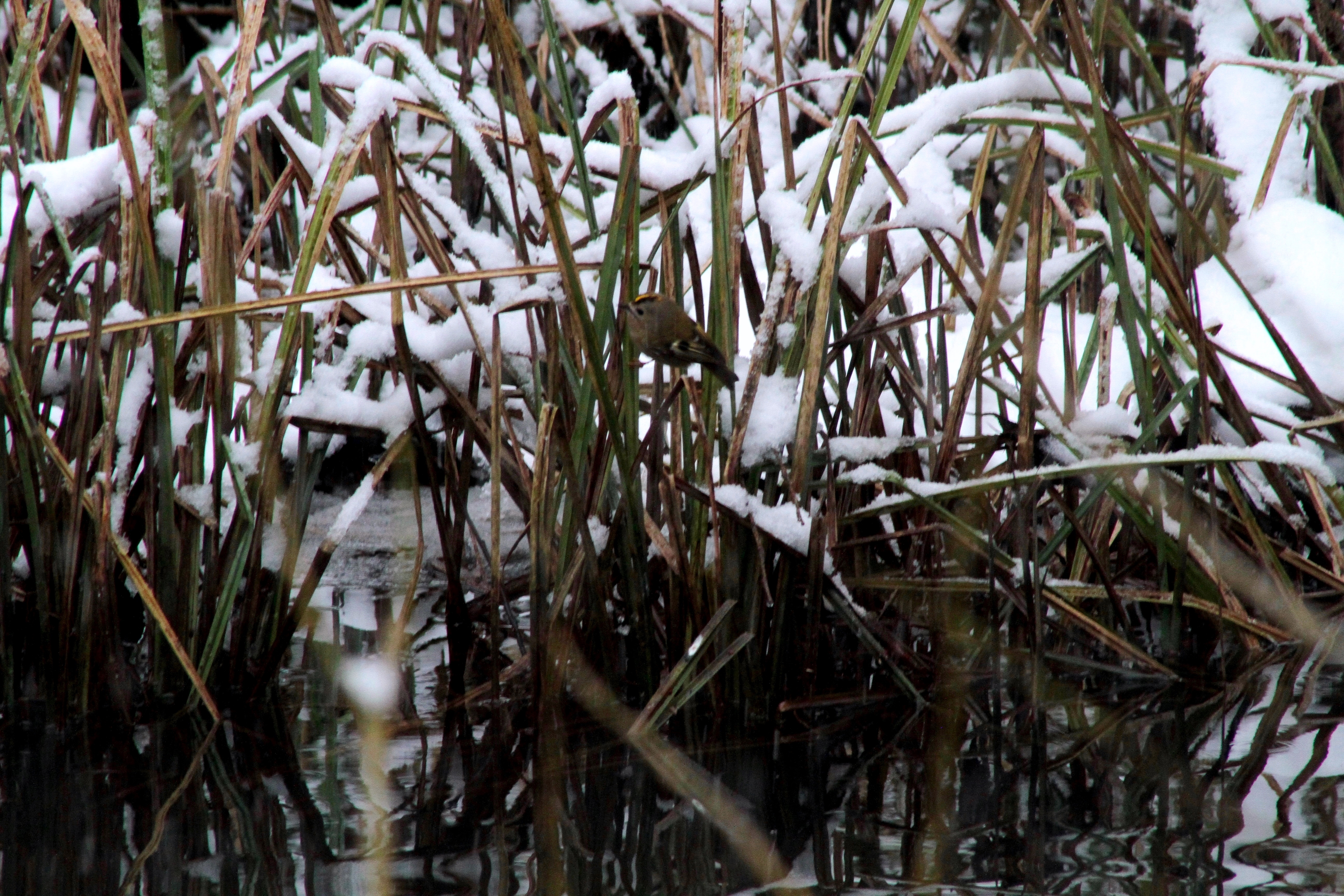
Goldcrest – Winter – Mote Park, Maidstone, Kent, UK

Several small passerine species survive freezing winter nights by inducing a lower metabolic rate and hypothermia, of a maximum of 10 °C (18 °F) below normal body temperature, in order to reduce energy consumption overnight. However, in freezing conditions, it may be that for very small birds, including the tiny goldcrest, the energy economies of induced hypothermia may be insufficient to counterbalance the negative effects of hypothermia including the energy required to raise body temperature back to normal at dawn. Observations of five well-fed birds suggest that they maintain normal body temperatures during cold nights by metabolising fat laid down during the day, and that they actually use behavioural thermoregulation strategies, such as collective roosting in dense foliage or snow holes to survive winter nights. Two birds roosting together reduce their heat loss by a quarter, and three birds by a third. During an 18‑hour winter night, with temperatures as low as −25 °C (−13 °F) in the north of its range, goldcrests huddled together can each burn off fat equivalent to 20% of body weight to keep warm.

Migrating birds rely largely on stored fat and they also metabolise protein as a supplementary source of energy. Those with a relatively large amount of fat, may make stops during migration of only 1–2 days; although they have lost weight since commencing their journey, they have enough energy reserves to reach the wintering areas. The proportion of migrating males increases as they travel south through Europe. There is competition within the species even during migration, and the larger and more aggressive males may get more food. Their death rate is therefore lower than that of the females both on the southward migration, and in resident populations.

== Predators and parasites ==
Throughout the goldcrest's range, the main predator of small woodland birds is the Eurasian sparrowhawk, which has a diet consisting of up to 98% birds. Merlins, tawny and long-eared owls also hunt goldcrests. The erratic movements and flights of small woodland birds, which are vulnerable to attack while away from cover, may help to confuse their predators. The goldcrest has only very rarely been recorded as a host of the common cuckoo, a widespread European brood parasite.

The goldcrest is a host of the widespread moorhen flea, Dasypsyllus gallinulae, and of the louse Philopterus reguli. The amblycerous mite Ricinus frenatus has been found on the eastern goldcrest subspecies, R. r. japonensis in Japan, and at the other end of the range in birds of the nominate subspecies on the Faroes and in Spain. These lice move over the host's body, and have strong mouthparts that pierce the host's skin so that they can feed on blood, and sometimes feather material. A number of feather mites have been recorded in the genus Regulus; these mites live on fungi growing on the feathers. The fungi found on the plumage may feed on the keratin of the outer feathers or on feather oil.

== Status ==
The goldcrest has a large range, estimated at 13.2 million km^{2} (5.1 million mi^{2}) and a total population estimated at 80–200 million individuals, and it is therefore classed as least concern on the IUCN Red List. There was some northward range expansion in Scotland, Belgium, Norway, and Finland during the 20th century, assisted by the spread of conifer plantations. The population is currently stable, although there may be temporary marked declines in harsh winters.

Although dense conifer growth can provide shelter for roosting at night, losses in hard winters can be heavy. In a Finnish study, only one-tenth of the wintering goldcrest population, which mainly fed on spiders, survived to spring. Each group roamed within a defined winter territory, and their winter survival depended on the density of the food supply. For these northern birds there is a trade off between staying put and risking starvation, or facing the perils of migration. Even in somewhat milder regions, where overwintering is normal, exceptionally cold winters can cause such heavy losses that breeding populations take several years to recover. In 1930, the English ornithologist Thomas Coward wrote:

Until the severe winter of 1916–17 the Goldcrest was abundant and widespread, nesting in all the wooded portions of our islands; in 1920 it could have little more than an obituary notice, for the nesting stock was practically "wiped out." ... and for some years, even as a winter visitor, the Goldcrest remained rare, absent from most of its nesting haunts. It is, however, now fully re-established.

Conversely, populations can expand rapidly after a series of mild winters. In lowland Britain, there was an increase of 48% following the 1970/71 winter, with many pairs spreading into deciduous woodlands where they would not normally breed.

== In culture ==
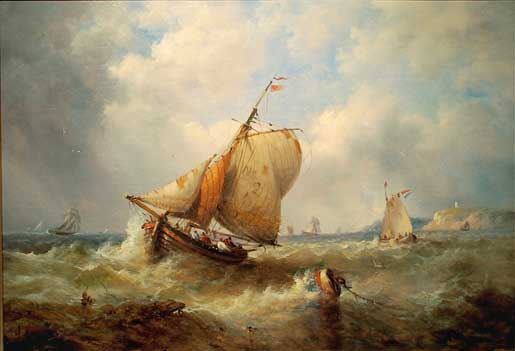
Fishing Boats Offshore by John Moore. Fishermen in Suffolk referred to the goldcrest as the "herring spink".

Aristotle (384–322 BC) and Pliny (23–79 AD) both wrote about the legend of a contest among the birds to see who should be their king, the title to be awarded to the one that could fly highest. Initially, it looked as though the eagle would win easily, but as he began to tire, a small bird that had hidden under the eagle's tail feathers emerged to fly even higher and claimed the title. Following from this legend, in much European folklore the wren has been described as the "king of the birds" or as a flame bearer. However, these terms were also applied to the Regulus species, the fiery crowns of the goldcrest and firecrest making them more likely to be the original bearers of these titles, and, because of the legend's reference to the "smallest of birds" becoming king, the title was probably transferred to the equally tiny wren. The confusion was probably compounded by the similarity and consequent interchangeability of the Greek words for the wren (βασιλεύς basileus, "king") and the crests (βασιλισκος basiliskos, "kinglet"). In English, the association between the goldcrest and Eurasian wren may have been reinforced by the kinglet's old name of "gold-crested wren".

It has had little other impact on literature, although it is the subject of Charles Tennyson Turner's short poem, "The Gold-crested Wren", first published in 1868. An old English name for the goldcrest is the "woodcock pilot", since migrating birds preceded the arrival of Eurasian woodcocks by a couple of days. There are unfounded legends that the goldcrest would hitch a ride in the feathers of the larger bird, and similar stories claimed that owls provided the transport. Suffolk fishermen called this bird "herring spink" when exhausted birds landed on the rigging of herring boats out in the North Sea.
