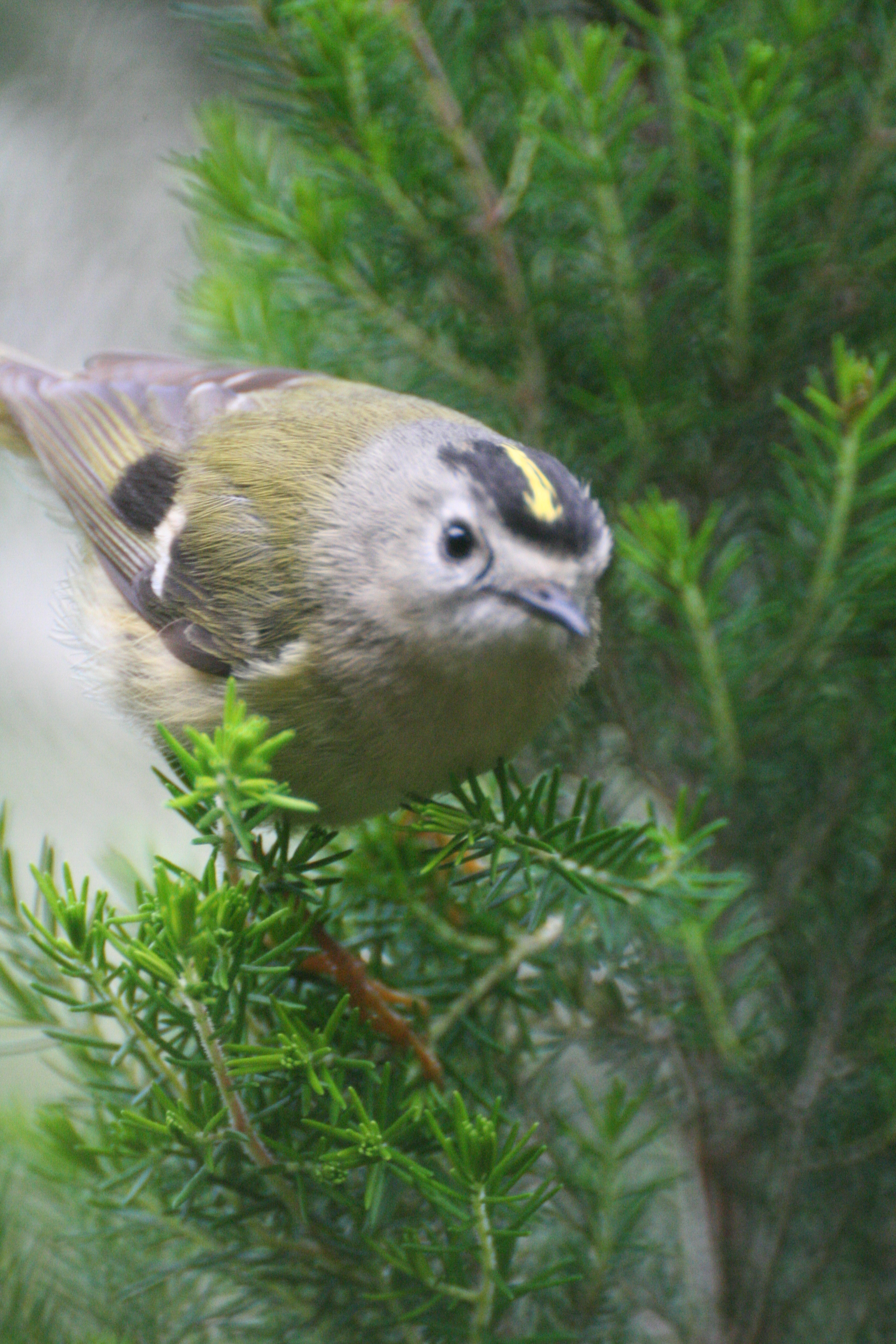

Conservation status
- Least Concern (IUCN 3.1)

Scientific classification
- Kingdom: Animalia
- Phylum: Chordata
- Class: Aves
- Order: Passeriformes
- Family: Regulidae
- Genus: Regulus
- Species: R. regulus
- Subspecies: R. r. teneriffae

Trinomial name
- Regulus regulus teneriffae Seebohm, 1883

= Tenerife goldcrest =

Subspecies of bird

The Tenerife goldcrest (Regulus regulus teneriffae) is a subspecies of the goldcrest. It closely resembles the continental subspecies, but has a broader black band across the forehead, slightly darker underparts and a longer bill. It breeds in the Canary Islands of Tenerife and La Gomera, where it is a non-migratory resident. It prefers Canary Island Pine forests, but also occurs in laurisilva forests. It is sometimes considered a species in its own right, as Regulus teneriffae.

The populations on La Palma and El Hierro, previously thought to belong to this taxon, are now recognised as, at least, a distinct subspecies, the Western Canary Islands goldcrest R. r. ellenthalerae (Päckert et al., 2006), which evolved from an independent colonisation of the islands.
