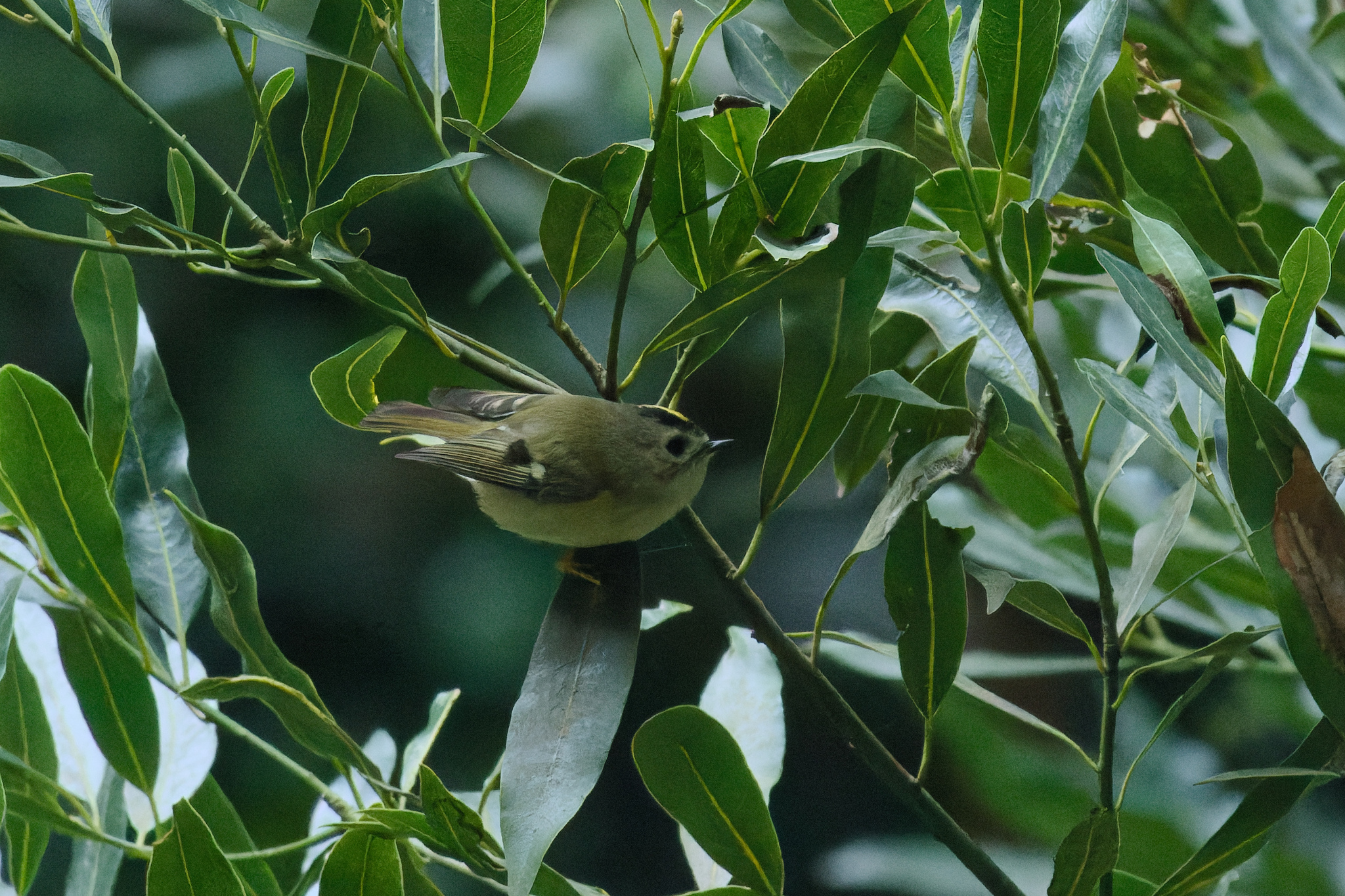

Scientific classification
- Kingdom: Animalia
- Phylum: Chordata
- Class: Aves
- Order: Passeriformes
- Family: Regulidae
- Genus: Regulus
- Species: R. regulus
- Subspecies: R. r. ellenthalerae

Trinomial name
- Regulus regulus ellenthalerae Päckert et al., 2006

= Western Canary Islands goldcrest =

Subspecies of bird

The Western Canary Islands goldcrest (Regulus regulus ellenthalerae) is a subspecies of the goldcrest. It is restricted to the western Canary Islands of La Palma and El Hierro where it is a non-migratory resident.

Previously thought to be the same taxon as the Tenerife Goldcrest (Regulus regulus teneriffae), it was separated as a distinct subspecies of the goldcrest which apparently evolved from an independent colonisation of the islands 1.3–1.8 million years ago.
