= Botanical Garden of Faial =

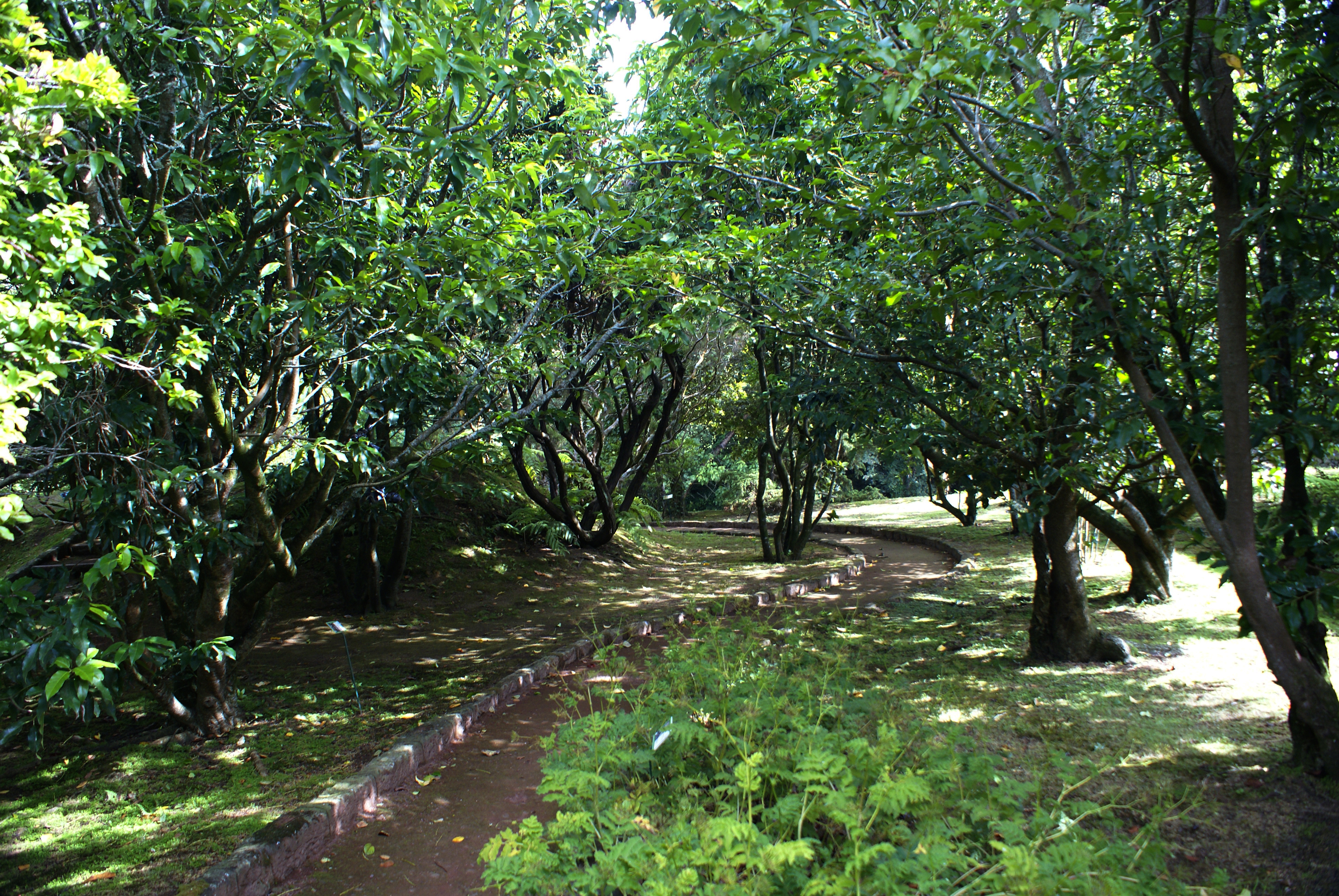
- A portion of the open-air exhibits of endemic species common to the Azores

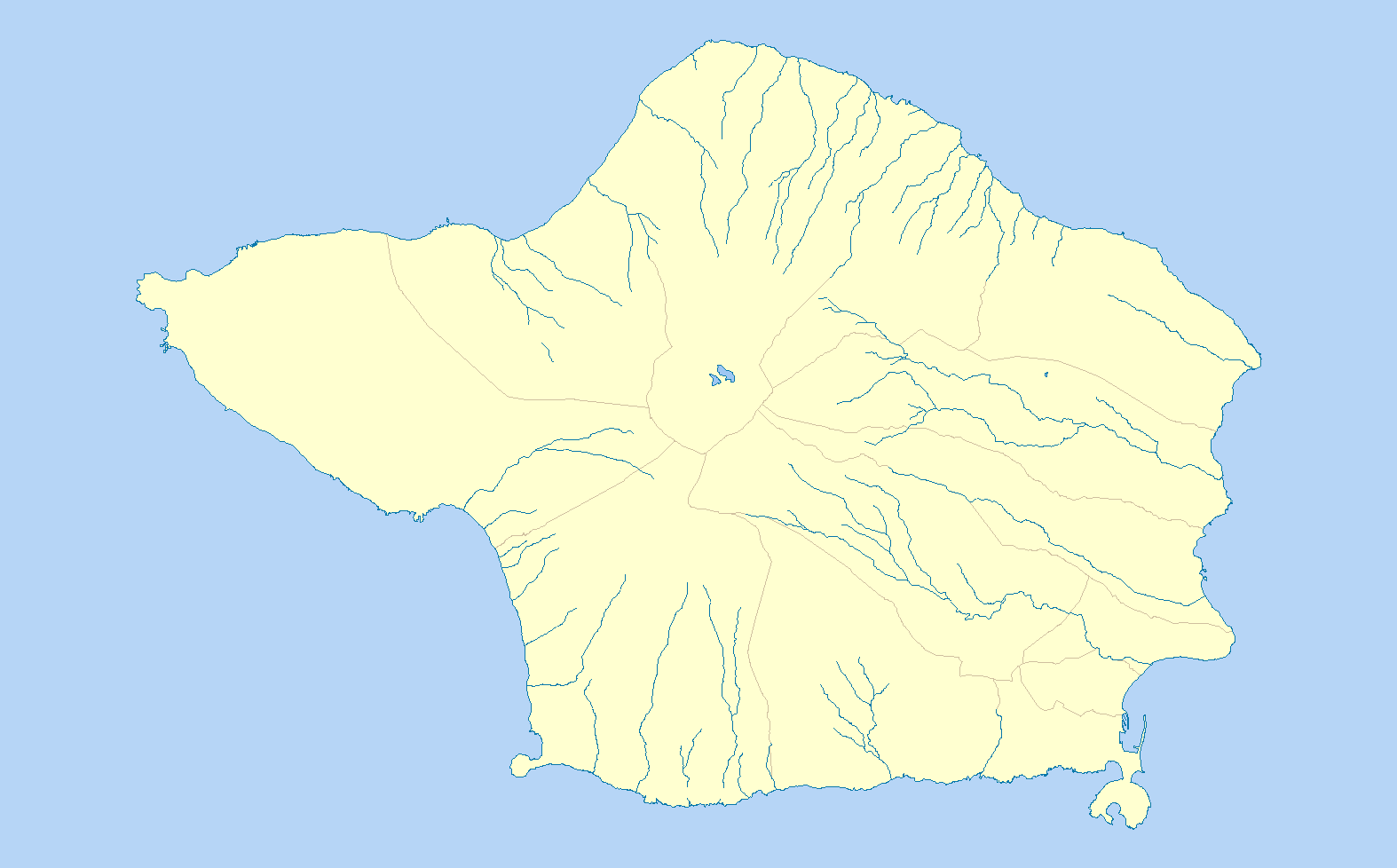
- Location within Faial
- Location: Horta, Faial, Central, Azores, Portugal
- Coordinates: 38°33′2.48″N 28°38′22.27″W
- Length: 40–56 km (25–35 mi)
- Width: 119.61 km (74.32 mi)
- Elevation: 114 m (374 ft)
- Established: Decreto Legislativo Regional n.º 46/2008/A
- Visitors: Summer: Monday to Friday (9:30 a.m. to 5:00 p.m.); Saturday and Sunday (2:00 p.m. to 5:30 p.m.); Winter: Monday to Friday (9:00 a.m. to 12:30 p.m.-2:00 p.m. to 5:00 p.m.)
- Operator: Secretário Regional do Ambiente e do Mar
- Website: www.jardimbotanicodofaial.com

The Botanical Garden of Faial is an ecological garden, component of the Faial Nature Park, established in 1986 to educate and protect the biodiversity common on Faial, an island of the Azores archipelago.

== History ==
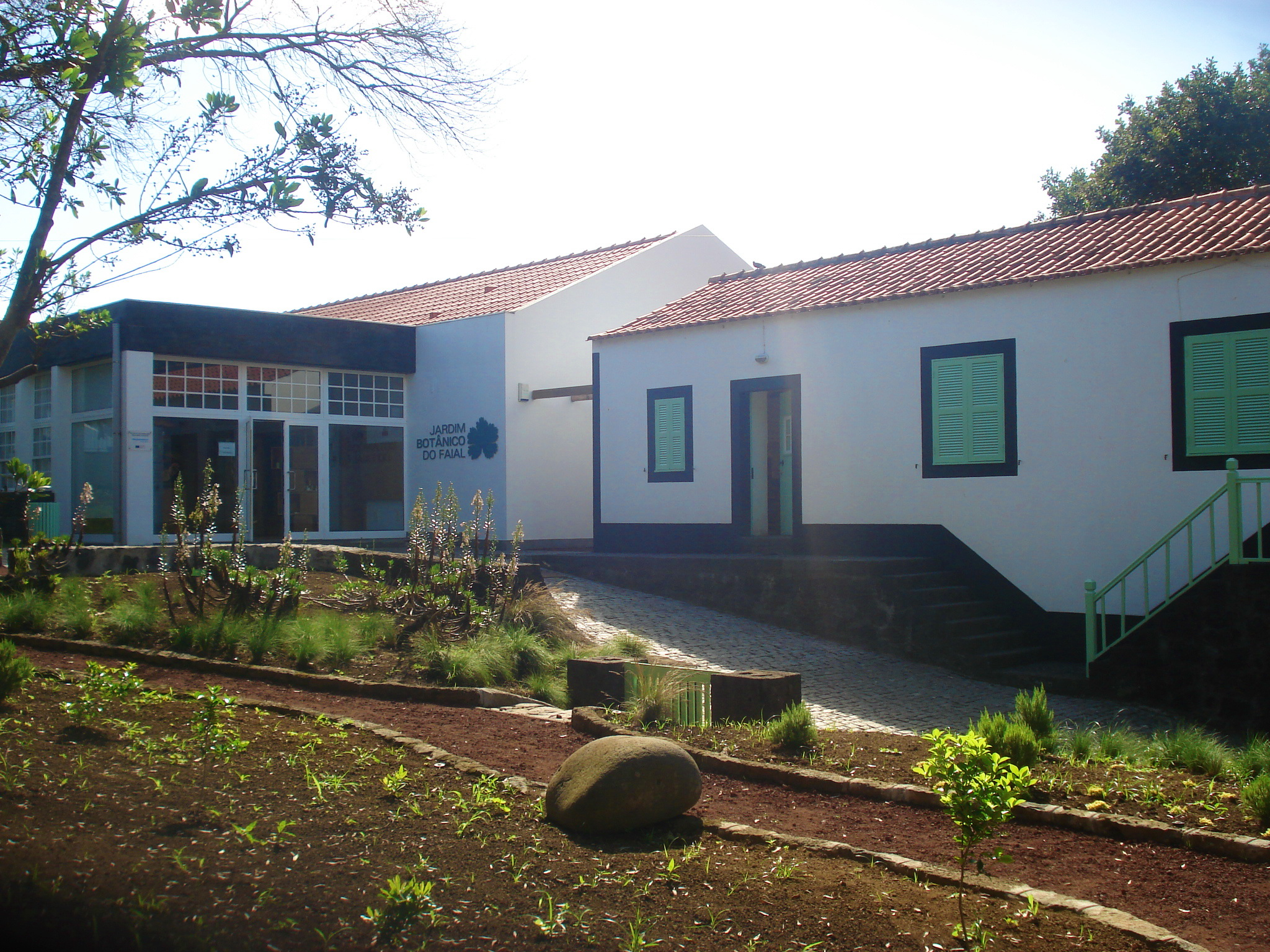
The main visitors centre and collection building in the Botanical Garden

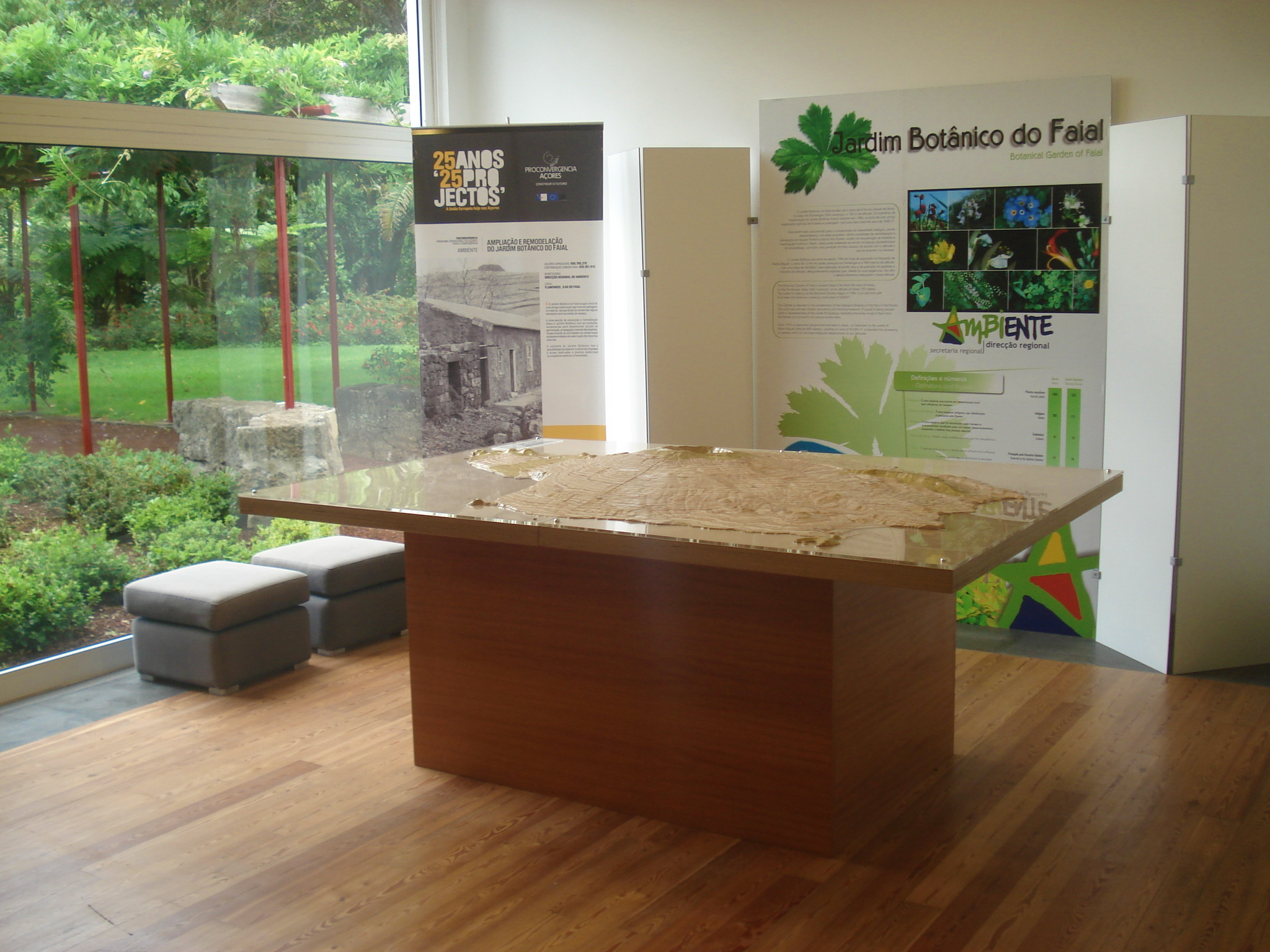
The Exhibition Hall in the Visitors Centre, with a maquette of the island of Faial

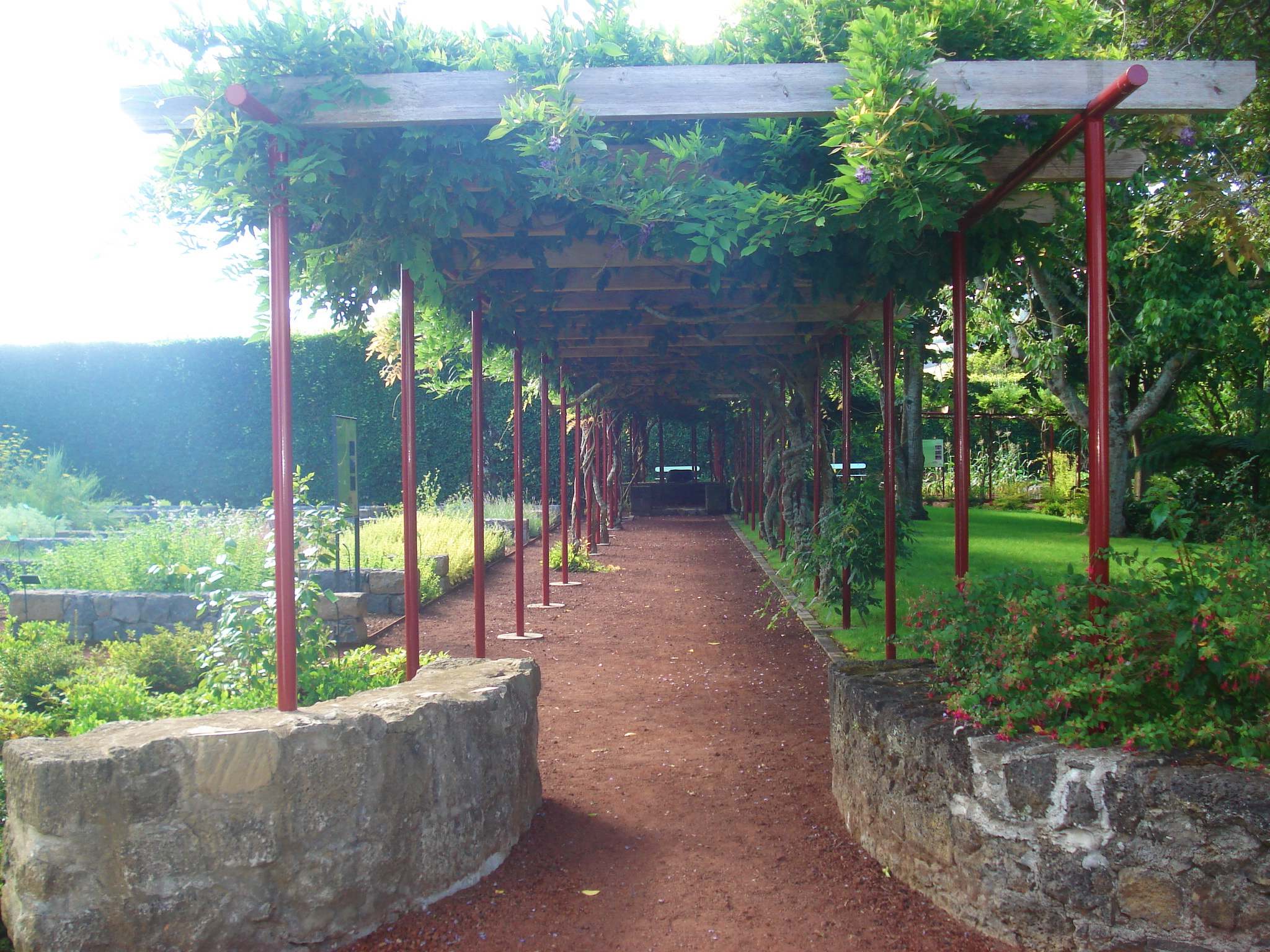
The entrance pergola to the open-air displays in the northern part of the garden

The Jardim Botânico do Faial began operating in 1986, and since that time has had more than 100,000 visitors.

In 1995 the Botanical Garden expanded its collection by including an area of Pedro Miguel, in the foothills of Lomba Grande. As part of its mission to promote investigation and education on the flora of the Azores and Macaronesia, it acquired 60,000 m^{2} area in an area of 400 metres above sea level to replant and rehabilitate the habitat and species characteristic of the Laurisilva biome.

In 2003, the garden administration began to create a seed bank to collect and maintain a viable gene pool of rare species common to the Azores.

After remodelling and renovations, the Gardens were reopened on 22 May 2011, marking the International Day of Biodiversity, which included guided tours, a tea tasting (from Casa D'Avilas), a film on the Faial Nature Park and the presentation of a new website, Sentir e Interpretar os Açores, produced by the Regional Directorate for the Environment and Oceans (Portuguese: Secretário Regional do Ambiente e do Mar). As part of the commemorative programs to celebrate the 25th anniversary of the Garden, the 9th Symposium of the Association of Ibero-Macaronésica Botanical Gardens was held in Horta. Part of the group's debates included discussion of the recuperation of landscapes deteriorated by invader species, as part of the regional programme PRECEFIAS (Portuguese: Plano Regional de Erradicação e Controlo de Espécies de Flora Invasora em Áreas Sensíveis), which permitted the reclamation of 650 hectares in 24 areas of the area of the Azores.

== Geography ==
The garden includes a couple of old farmhouses and land on the edge of an orange orchard of Quinta de São Lourenço, in the civil parish of Flamengos. It occupies an area of approximately 8000 m^{2}, situated along the road that connects the southern part of Flamengos with Conceição.

== Centre ==
The function of the Botanical Gardens of Faial, apart from providing a natural landscape, is to preserve and maintain the collection of endemic plants common to the island of Faial and the Azores. This includes the conservation of seeds of various endemic species, the propagation of habitats of existing species and to promote an understanding of the rich floral diversity and historical importance to the islands. In the autonomous region there are records that indicate that 90% of the endemic plants common at the time of the early settlement have disappeared or were crossed with other species. The seed bank has been able to collect 28 of the 76 species of endemic plants (approximately one third).

The interpretative centres attempt to educative, but also provide examples in a natural setting that fosters scientific investigation, referred to as ex-situ; species are taken from their natural locations and nurtured in a protected environment, where they can be seen, understood and investigated.

=== Gardens ===
The Garden is actually a series of spaces that show open-air examples of plants, trees and herbaceous species, as well as medicinal, aromatic and exotic ornamental plants, traditionally used on the islands. Specifically, the Garden is also a depository of some of the more rare plants in the Region, such as the Veronica Dabney.

In the Ilídio Botelho da Costa herbarium, the visitor can encounter species native and exotic herbs, allowing the identification of uncommon species.

In addition, there is an orquidário (orchid garden), with examples of 30 different species of orchids collected by Henrique Peixoto (1917–2007), which were titled to the local Santa Casa da Misericórdia.

The collection includes common and hybrid varieties of Cattleyas, Vandas, Lael, Gongora, Stanhopea, Milton, Epidendros, Dendrobii, among others, including a rare species from the island of Madagascar that contributed to Charles Darwin's theory of evolution. Other important orchids include the Paphiopedilum and Phragmipedium families, which have fused sepals similar to a bag, that attract insects who fall into its flower. Forced to escape only through a narrow passage these insects are coated by pollen when they exit. The pollen is then transported to other plants which are pollenized.

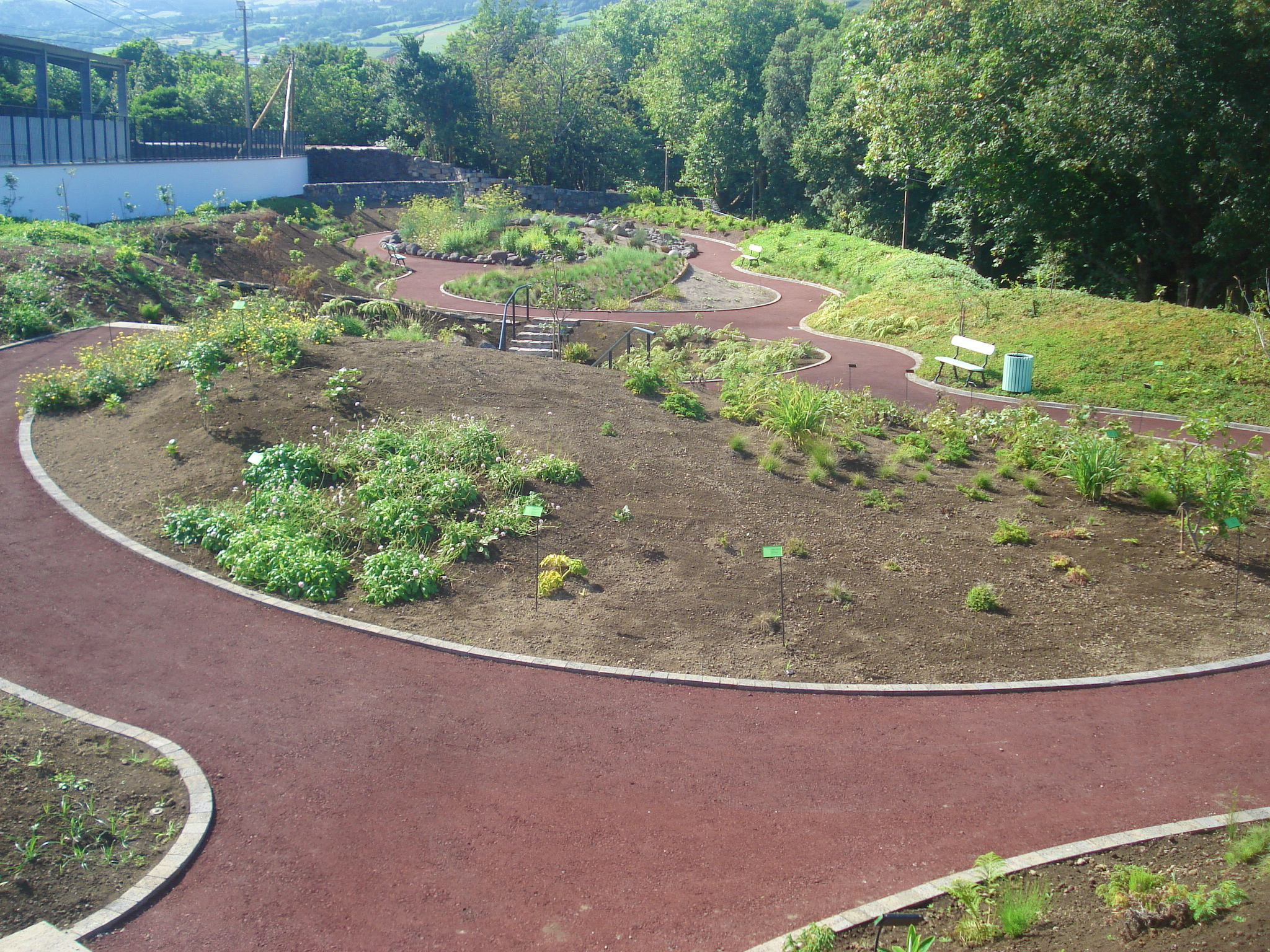
The indigenous plants exhibit: identifying plants found in each Azorean biome

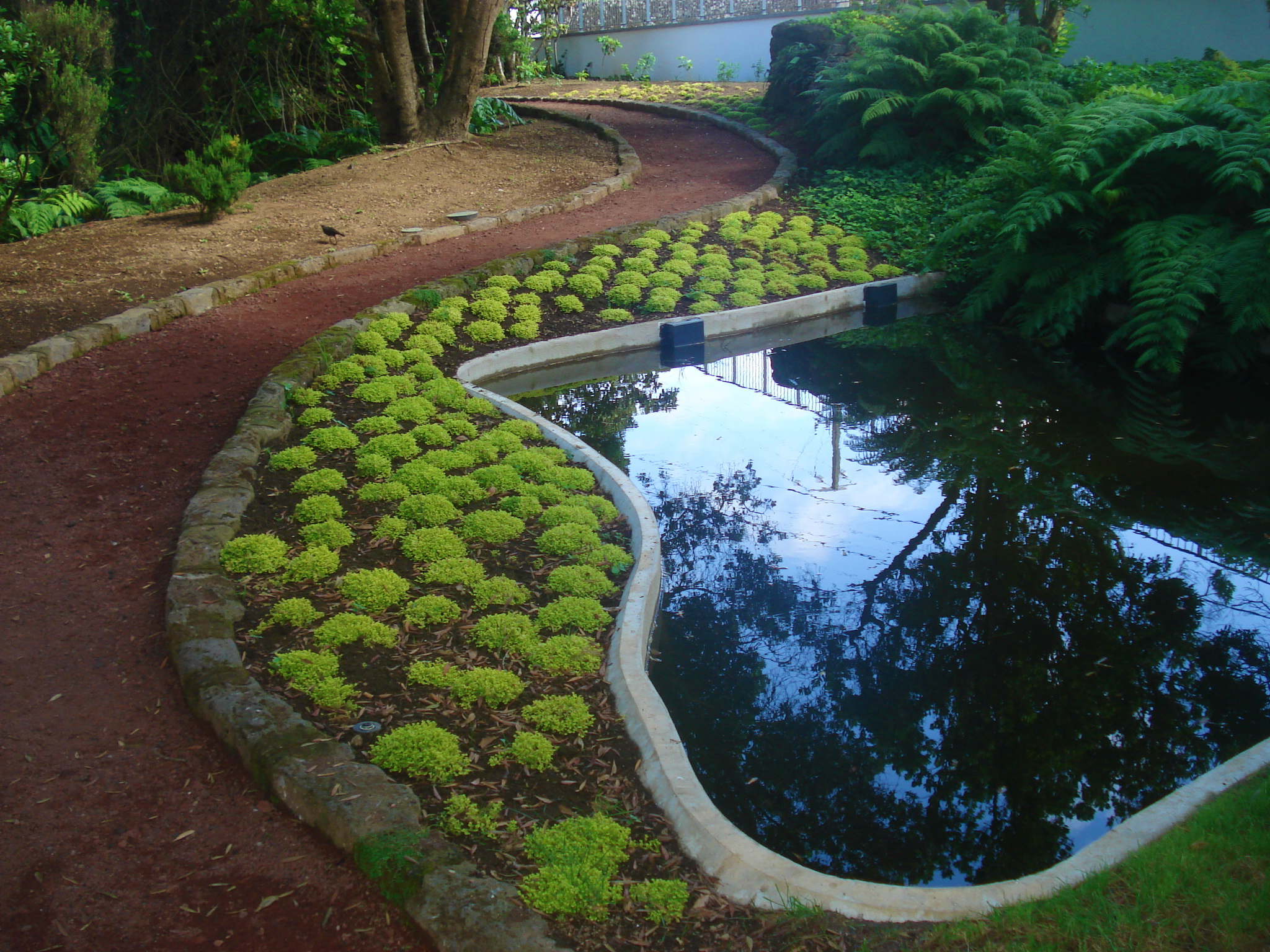
The trail winding through the botanical displays of indigenous and contemporary plants

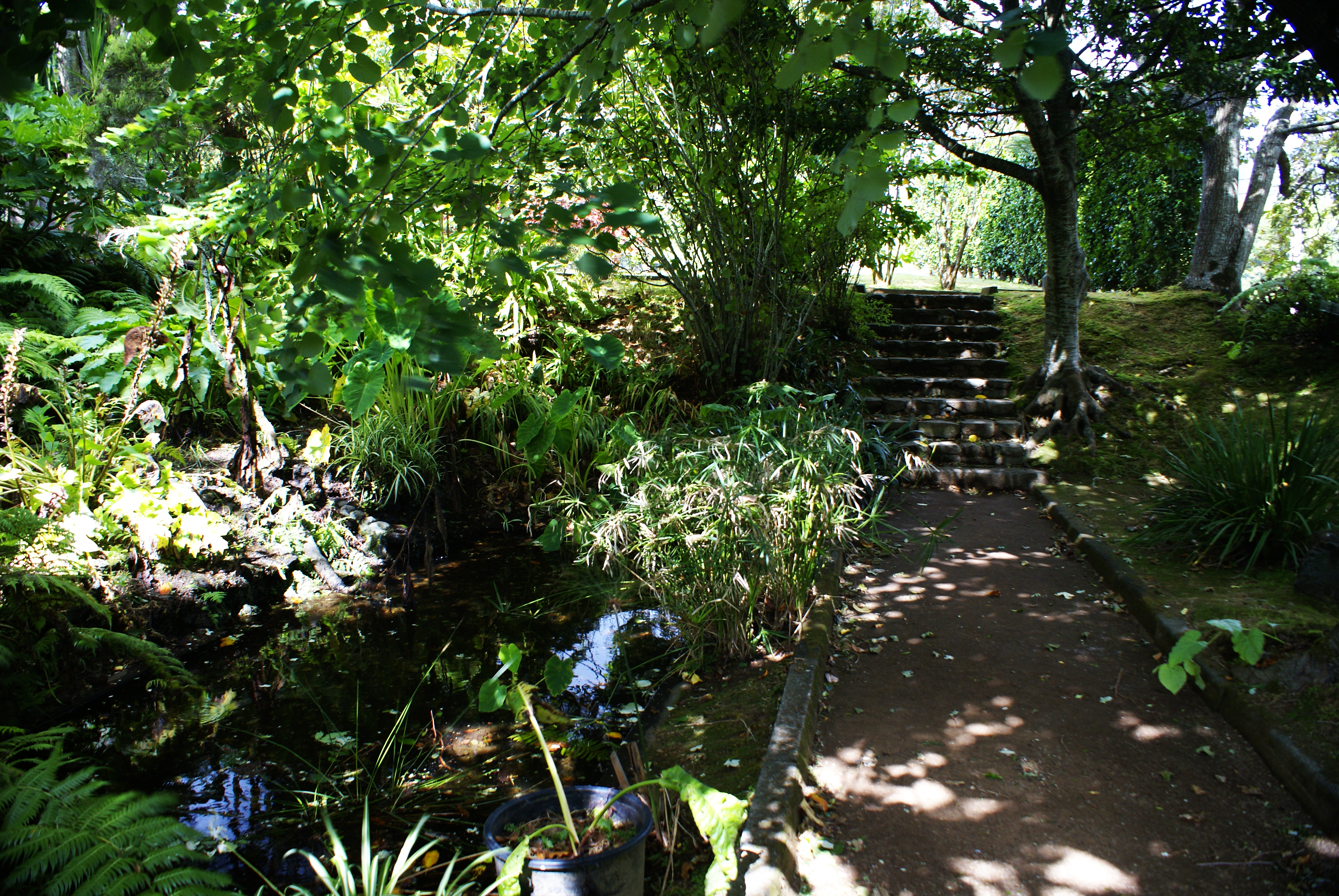
The exhibits display plants in their original conditions: terrestrial and marine
