= Nature Park of Faial =

Protected area of the island of Faial

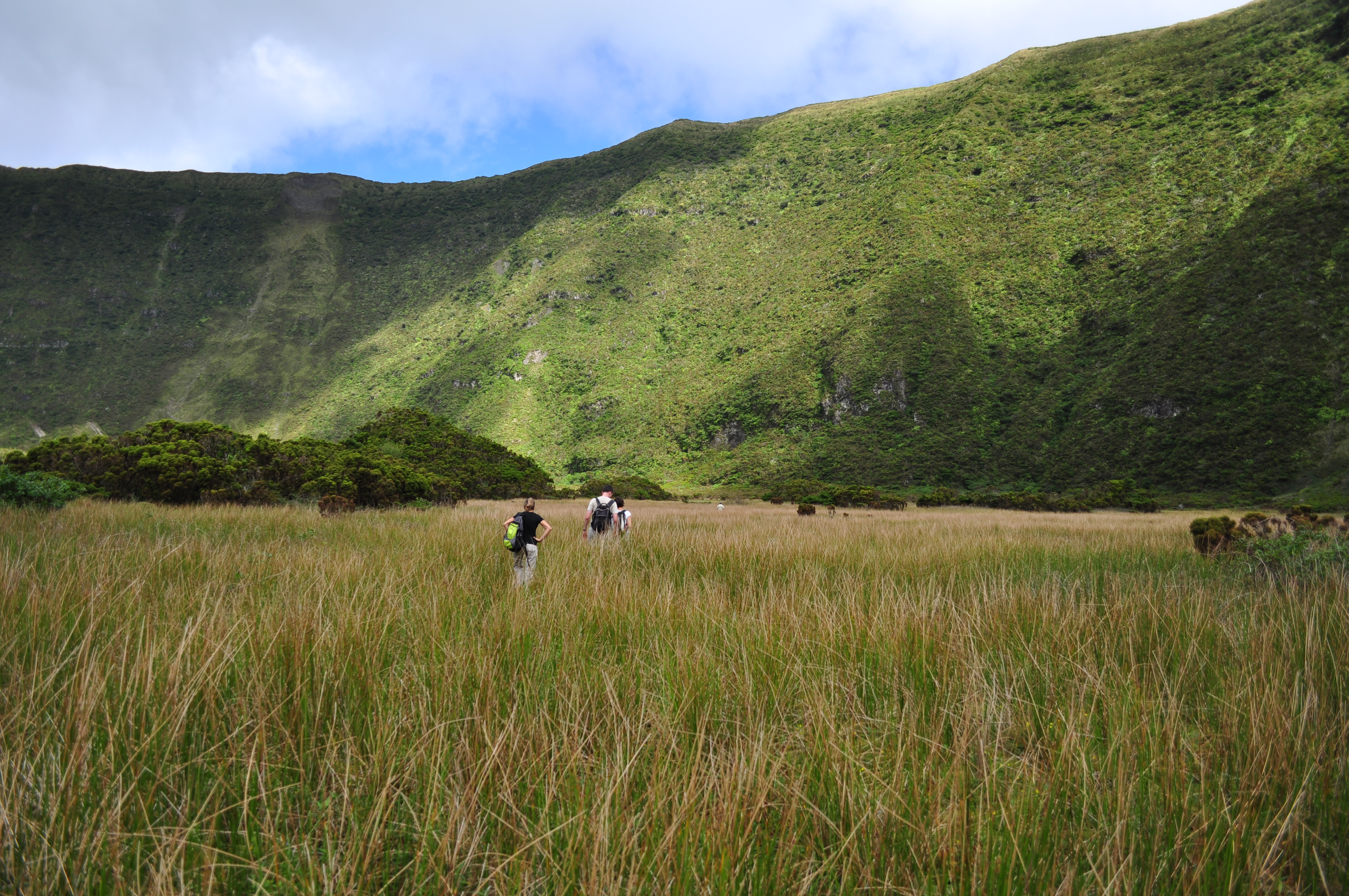
- The caldera floor of Faial's stratovolcano, integrated into the dispersed Parque Natural do Faial

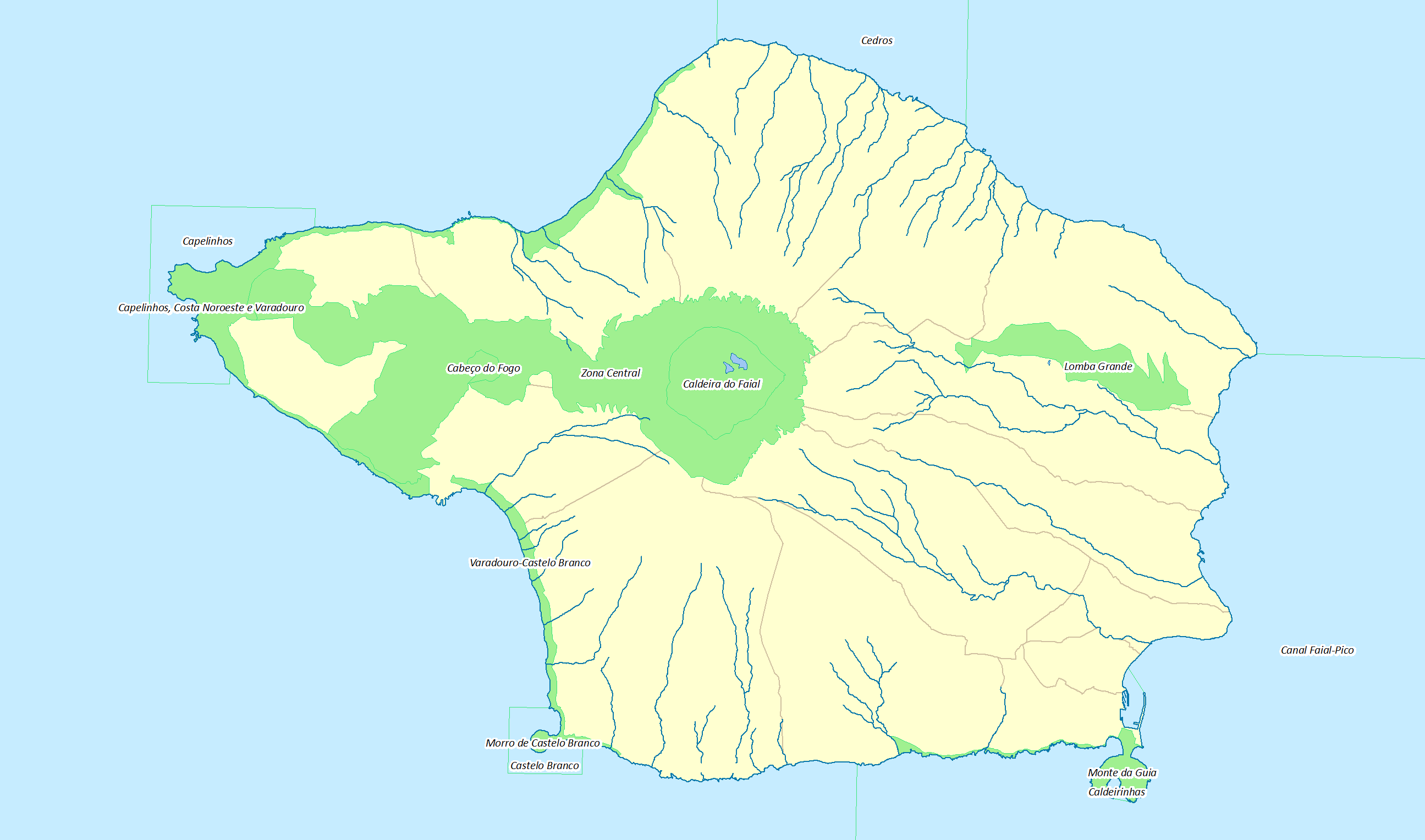
- The location of the various protected areas that constitute the Faial Nature Park
- Location: Horta, Faial, Central, Azores, Portugal
- Coordinates: 38°34′46″N 28°42′59″W
- Length: 21.20 km (13.17 mi)
- Width: 16.29 km (10.12 mi)
- Area: 173.06 km^{2} (66.82 sq mi)
- Elevation: 877 m (2,877 ft)
- Established: Decreto Legislativo Regional 46/2008/A
- Named for: Faial
- Operator: Secretário Regional do Ambiente e do Mar
- Website: Faial Nature Park

The Nature Park of Faial (Portuguese: Parque Natural do Faial), or simply Faial Nature Park (PNF), developed from the intention of better managing the protected areas of the island of Faial, and was instituted by the Secretaria Regional do Ambiente e do Mar (English: Regional Secretariate for the Environment and Oceans) of the Autonomous Regional Government of the Azores.

It covers approximately 17% of the island, classified under the International Union for Conservation of Nature's Nature Reserve designation (which includes the Caldeira, Morro de Castelo Branco and Caldeirinhas do Monte da Guia), Protected Areas for the management of habitat or species (Cabeço do Fogo, Capelinhos, Costa Noroeste, Varadouro and Castelo Branco), Protected Landscape Areas (Monte da Guia and the central zone of the island) and Protected Areas for Management of Resources (Faial-Pico Channel, Castelo Branco, Capelinhos and Cedros).

== History ==
The Faial Nature Park was established by legislative decree No.15/2007/A, on 25 June 2007, which reformulated the juridical classification, management and administration of the Azorean areas of protection.

The public presentation of the Nature Park occurred on the 18 June 2011, in a ceremony that included the Regional Secretary of the Environment and Oceans (Portuguese: Secretário Regional do Ambiente e do Mar) Álamo Mensese, as well as other invited guests from business, tourism and environmental groups.

After being highlighted by the Tourism Association of Portugal (Portuguese: Associação Turismo de Portugal), as a national candidate for the European Destinations of Excellence (EDEN) award, the European Commission confirmed this national distinction during an award ceremony on 27 June 2011. The EDEN awards (established in 2007) is a European Union initiative to promote models of sustainable development within the European Community. Held on board a Faialense OceanEye ship (permitting its guests the luxury of being able to examine the waters around Faial), the small event included representatives of the Regional Secretariate for the Environment and Oceans (Portuguese: Secretária Regional do Ambiente e do Mar), including Álamo Meneses, and director of the Nature Park, Noão Melo, in addition to other European dignitaries.

== Geography ==
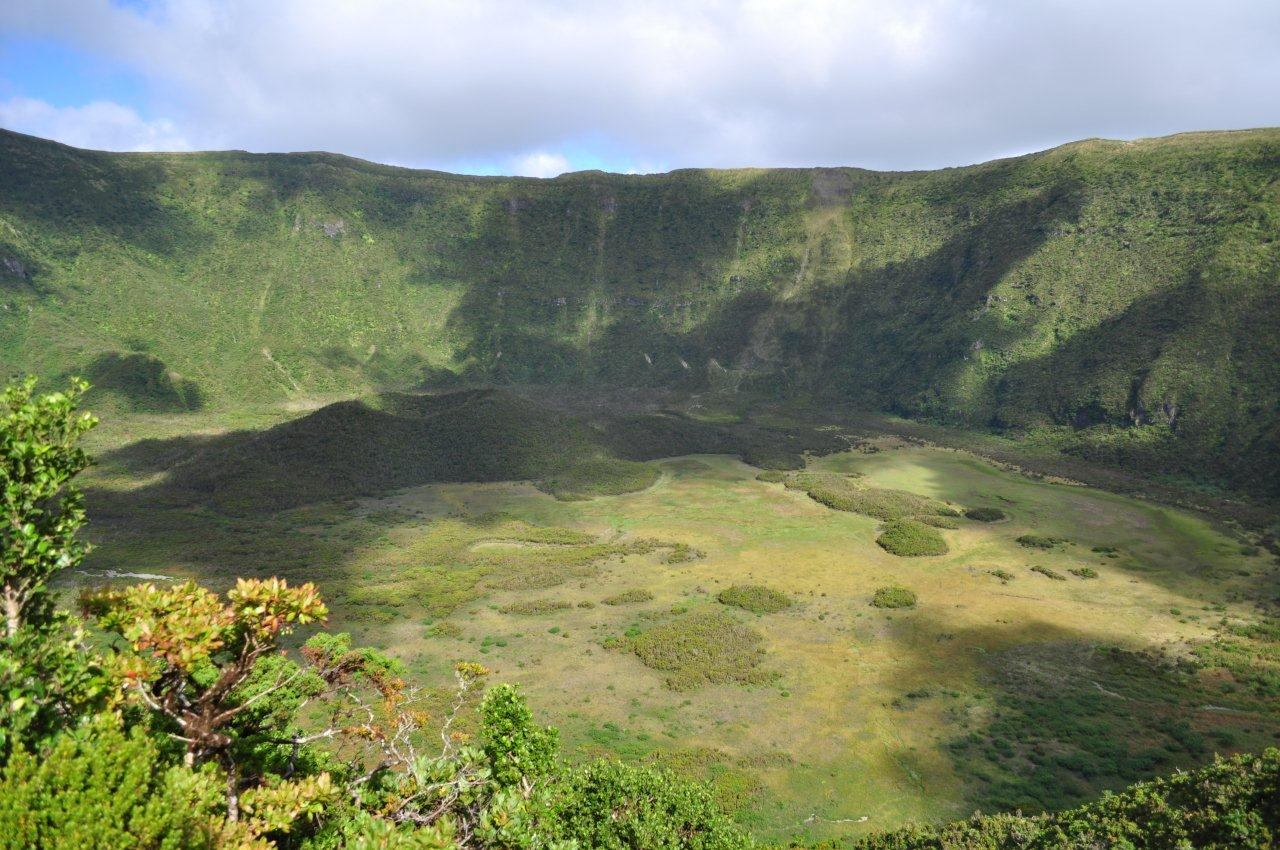
The Caldera, the central crater of the island of Faial

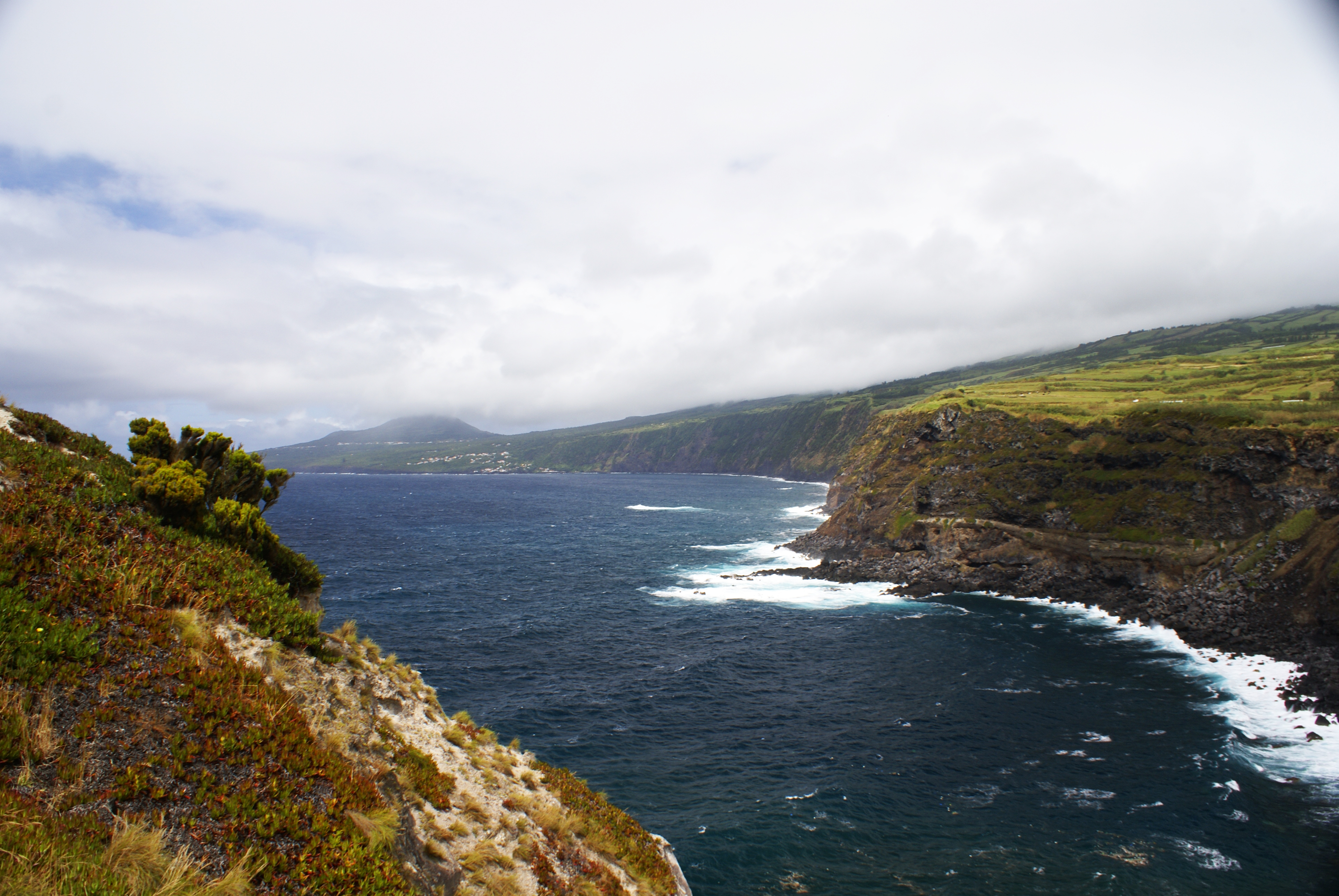
The Morro of Castelo Branco, a nesting area for migratory seabirds

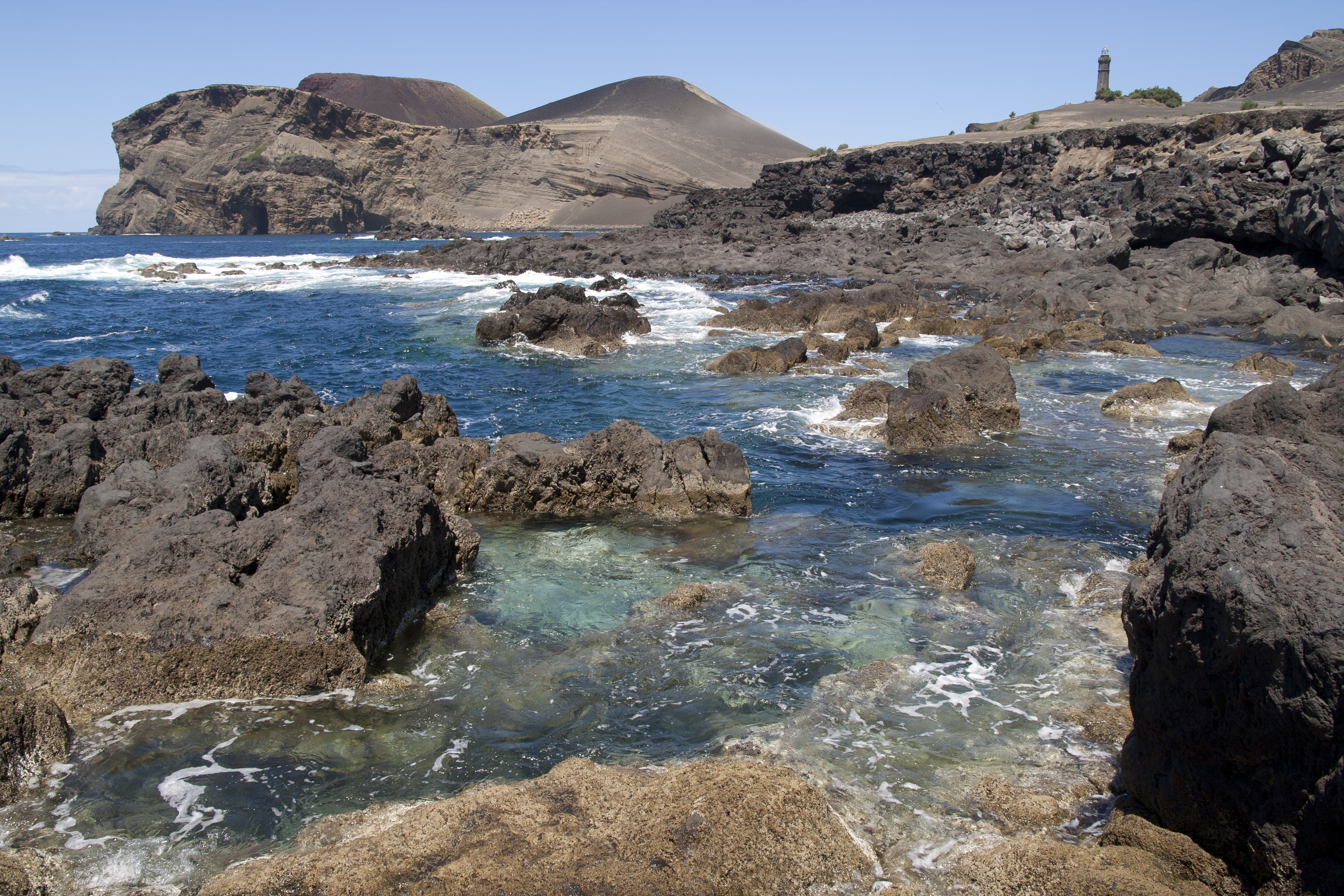
A view of the Capelinhos and the northwest coast of, protected for management of species and natural resources

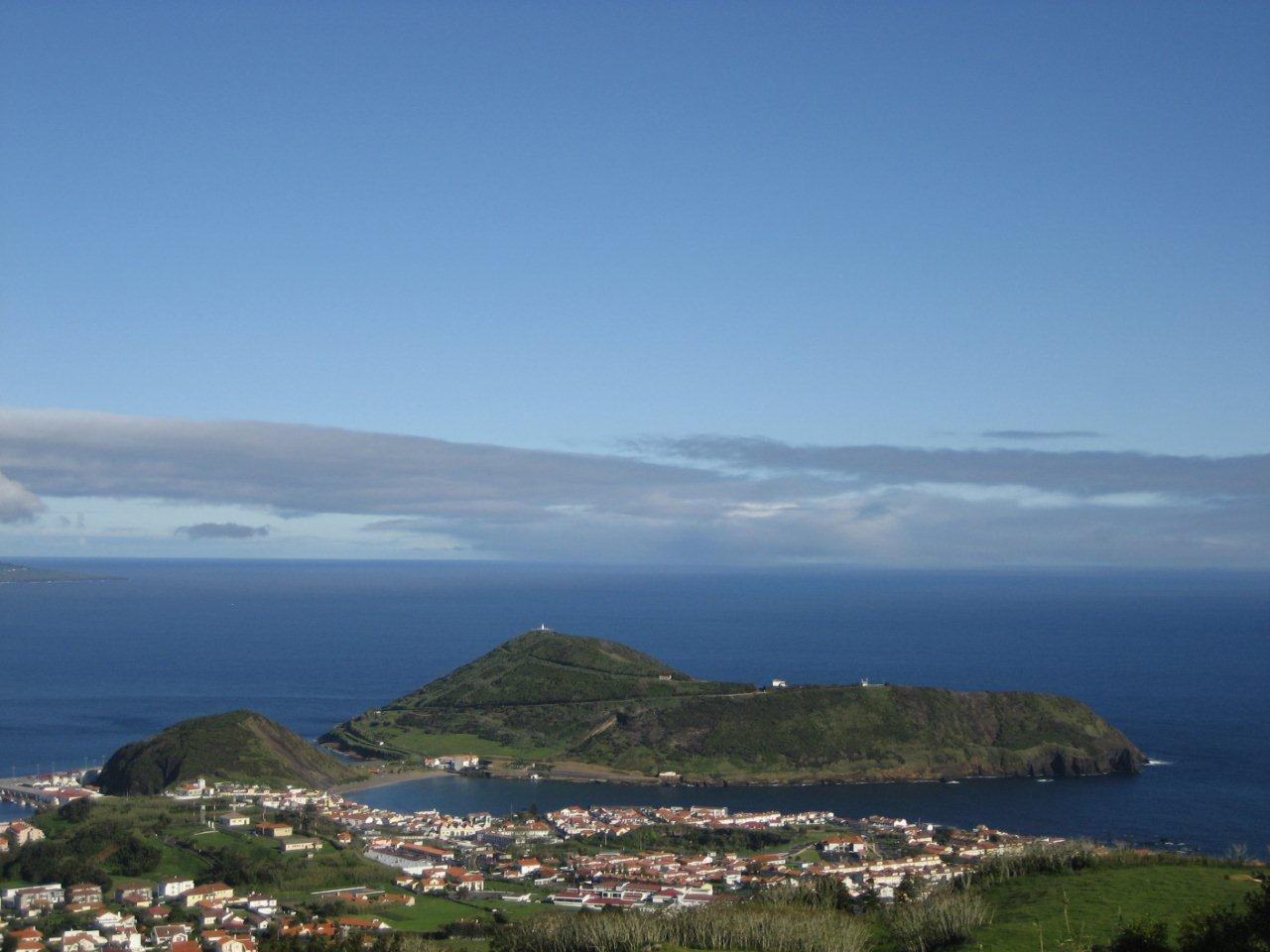
The volcanic cone of Monte da Guia, protected due to its abundance of marine life, including migratory birds

The Faial Nature Park is actually a dispersed reserve that encompasses several individual areas of protection.

=== Classified areas ===
==== Nature Reserves ====
Those areas classified as Nature Reserves (Portuguese: Reserva Natural):

- [FAI01] Nature Reserve of the Caldeirinhas (Portuguese: Reserva Natural das Caldeirinhas), this area, includes the remnants of two submerged craters that are open to the sea on the ancient volcanic cone of Monta da Guia (on the south coast of Faial, adjacent to the city of Horta); it is a nesting area for both migratory and local seabirds, and includes only the small bay open to the Atlantic Ocean;
- [FAI02] Nature Reserve of the Caldera of Faial (Portuguese: Reserva Natural da Caldeira do Faial), defined by the rim and interior of the central caldera of Faial, it is delimited from Alto do Cabouco, where it circles the rim, passing through geodesic points at Canto dos Saquinhos, Alto do Guardo Sol and Alto do Brejo;
- [FAI03] Nature Reserve of the Morro do Castelo Branco (Portuguese: Reserva Natural do Morro do Castelo Branco), this region starts at the isthmus that connects the Morro do Castelo Branco to the island of Faial (at 49 metres above sea leve), and continues southeast towards the coast where it circles the volcanic dome along the coast;

==== Protected Areas ====
Areas classified for Protection and Management of Habitats or Species (Portuguese: Área Protegida para a Gestão de Habitats ou Espécies):

- [FAI04] Protected Area of Cabeço do Fogo (Portuguese: Área Protegida para a Gestão de Habitats ou Espécies do Cabeço do Fogo), from the intersection of the Regional Roadway (Portuguese: Estrada Regional) and Forest Road (Portuguese: Caminho florestal) at Fonte das Areias the border extends northeast until about 450 metres above sea level circling the Cabeço do Fogo at this isoline before circling south until the 500 metre altitude until the geodesic marker in the southern limit of Cabeço do Fogo, returning to the south-southwest to the intersection (a region similar to a comma);
- [FAI05] Protected Area of Capelinhos, Northwest Coast and Varadouro (Portuguese: Área Protegida para a Gestão de Habitats ou Espécies dos Capelinhos, Costa Noroeste e Varadouro), this zone of habitat management begins in the southern coast of Varadouro and follows the contour of the coast encompassing the Capelinhos volcano and Costa Nau region, continuing along the coastal flanks of the northwest coast. From the cliffs of the Areia da Quinta Bay (in the Fajã of Praia do Norte) the region also continues to the valley of Ribeira Funda and the cliffs that reach Cedros;
- [FAI06] Protected Area of Varadouro-Castelo Branco (Portuguese: Área Protegida para a Gestão de Habitats ou Espécies Varadouro–Castelo Branco), this protected area includes the escarpment face of the southern coast, extending from Varadouro to the Morro de Castelo Branco;
- [FAI07] Protected Area of Lomba Grande (Portuguese: Área Protegida para a Gestão de Habitats ou Espécies Lomba Grande), starting at the intersection of Canada da Lomba Grande and the Regional E.R.1-1ª roadway, this protected area runs north until the Caminho da Serra da Ribeirinha, where it continues until intersecting in the northeast of Areiro, bends towards the south until the Canada da Lomba Grande where it heads west then southeast until south of the Fonte Nova ravine. From here, the limit bends to the northeast, passing the 404 metre mark untilCanada da Lomba Grande, heading then east to point of departure. In general, the protected area includes most of the Lomba Grande escarpment and crosses the limits of the Cabouco Forest Park (Portuguese: Parque Florestal do Cabouco).

==== Protected Landscapes ====
Areas classified as Protected Landscapes (Portuguese: Paisagem Protegida):

- [FAI08] Protected Landscape of Monte da Guia (Portuguese: Área de Paisagem Protegida do Monte da Guia), this area encompasses the double cone system of Monte da Guia and Monte Queimado; from the Castle of São Sebastião the area is delineated by the Rua do Pasteleiro north until the Travessa do Porto Pim where it continues east to Rua da Rosa then north to the Regional E.R.1-1ª where it circles Monte Queimado, bypassing the container terminal and harbour, before jutting into the Atlantic Ocean and circling Monte de Guia;
- [FAI09] Protected Landscape of the Central Zone (Portuguese: Área de Paisagem Protegida da Zona Central), beginning at the intersection of Regional Roadway E.R.3-2ª and road to Capelinhos, the protected area encompasses the extinct cones of Cabeço Verde, Cabeço da Fonte, Caldeirão, Cabeço do Canto and Caldeirinhas along the Capelo cape until Cabeço do Goularte before extending into the interior encircling the flanks of the central caldera. Further, the habitat management area includes the Parque Florestal do Capelo (Forest Park of Capelo) where it intersects the volcanoes until the southwest corner of the island between Biscoitos and Varadouro (while not including the built-up area of the village or the Varadouro coastal management area).

==== Resource Areas ====
Areas classified for Management of Resources (Portuguese: Gestão de Recursos):

- [FAI10] Protected Resource Management Area of the Faial Channel (Portuguese: Área Protegida de Gestão de Recursos do Canal Faial-Pico), this management zone follows the 38°35,533'N north, then west to the coast between Castelo de São Sebastião and Ribeira da Granja by the Regional E.R.1-1ª and then the 28°41,097' W meridian, south by the 28°41,067'N parallel, then east to the island of Pico (and the 28°29,067'W meridian);
- [FAI11] Protected Resource Management Area of Castelo Branco (Portuguese: Área Protegida de Gestão de Recursos do Castelo Branco), the area is delimited north by the 38°31,766'N parallel and coastline, south by the 38°31,083'N parallel, east by the 28°44,616'W meridian and coastline and finally west by the 28°45,600'N meridian;
- [FAI12] Protected Resource Management Area of Capelinhos (Portuguese: Área Protegida de Gestão de Recursos dos Capelinhos), this region extends into the waters around Capelinhos delimited north by the 38°36,833'N parallel, south by the 38°35,017'N parallel, west by the 28°50,400'W meridian and east by the coast and 28°49,333'W meridian, and south along the 28°48,216'W parallel (north);
- [FAI13] Protected Resource Management Area of Cedros (Portuguese: Área Protegida de Gestão de Recursos dos Cedros), the coastal management area extends along the coast of Cedros, between the 28°43,067'W and 28°39,783'W medians north until the 38°39,333'N parallel.

=== Scenic overlooks ===
As part of the tourist-friendly nature of the Park, there are many belvederes and lookouts throughout the island, showing picturesque views of the islands flora and geography, including the Caldera, the Forest Park of Cabouco (Portuguese: Parque Florestal do Cabouco), Ribeira das Cabras, the Morro de Castelo Branco, the Capelinhos Volcano, Caldeirinhas and Dabney lookout (overlooking the city of civil parish of Angustias from Monte da Guia, in Horta).

=== Trails ===
The Faial Nature Park includes a group of pedestrian trails, some following the coast, others near or across the stratovolcano. Each trail allows visitors to discover a series of points-of-interest distinguished by varying landscapes and environments, with their own flora and fauna, as well as geology. Many of the trails have a historical importance, and were used by locals to travel between communities (trading goods, vegetables or fish, among others).

On Faial there are several distinct trails:

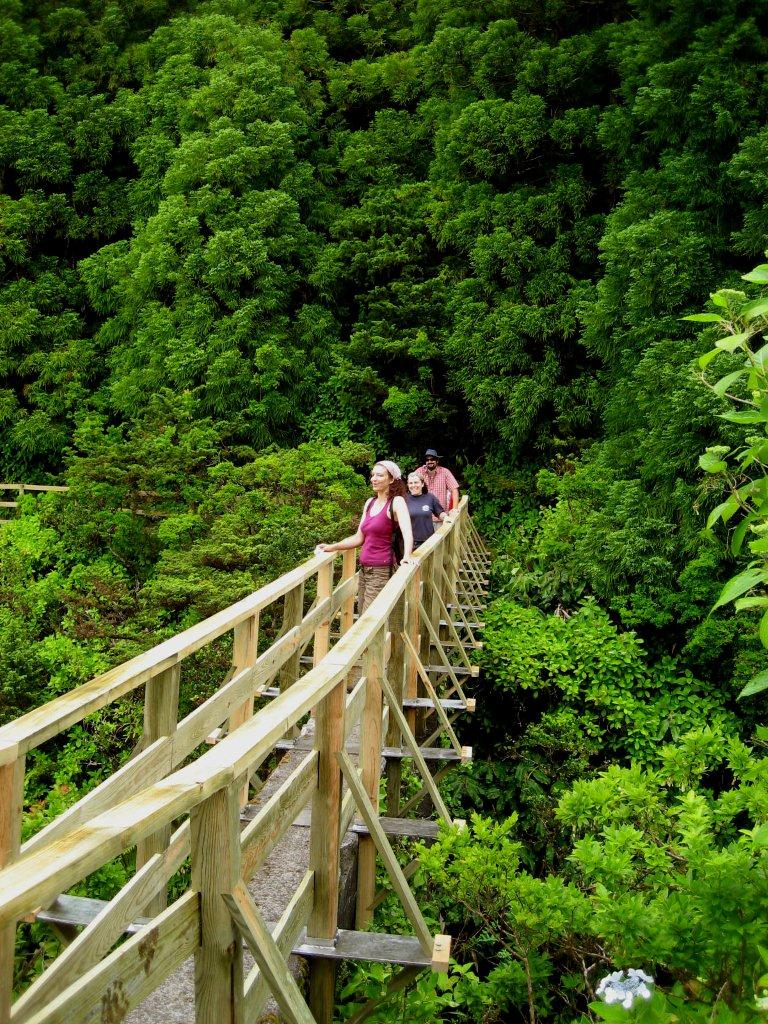
A bridge along the Levada Trail

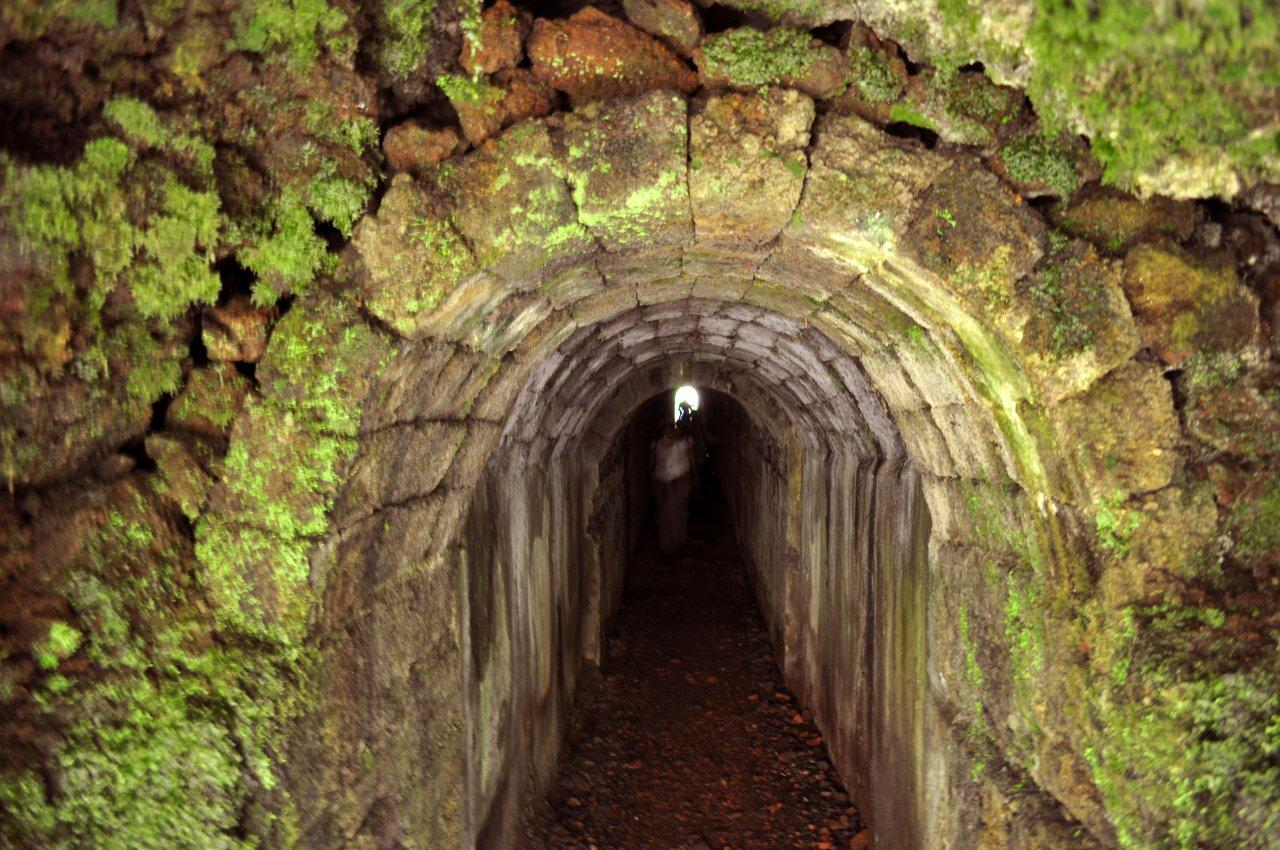
The tunnel access that extends underneath the caldera wall

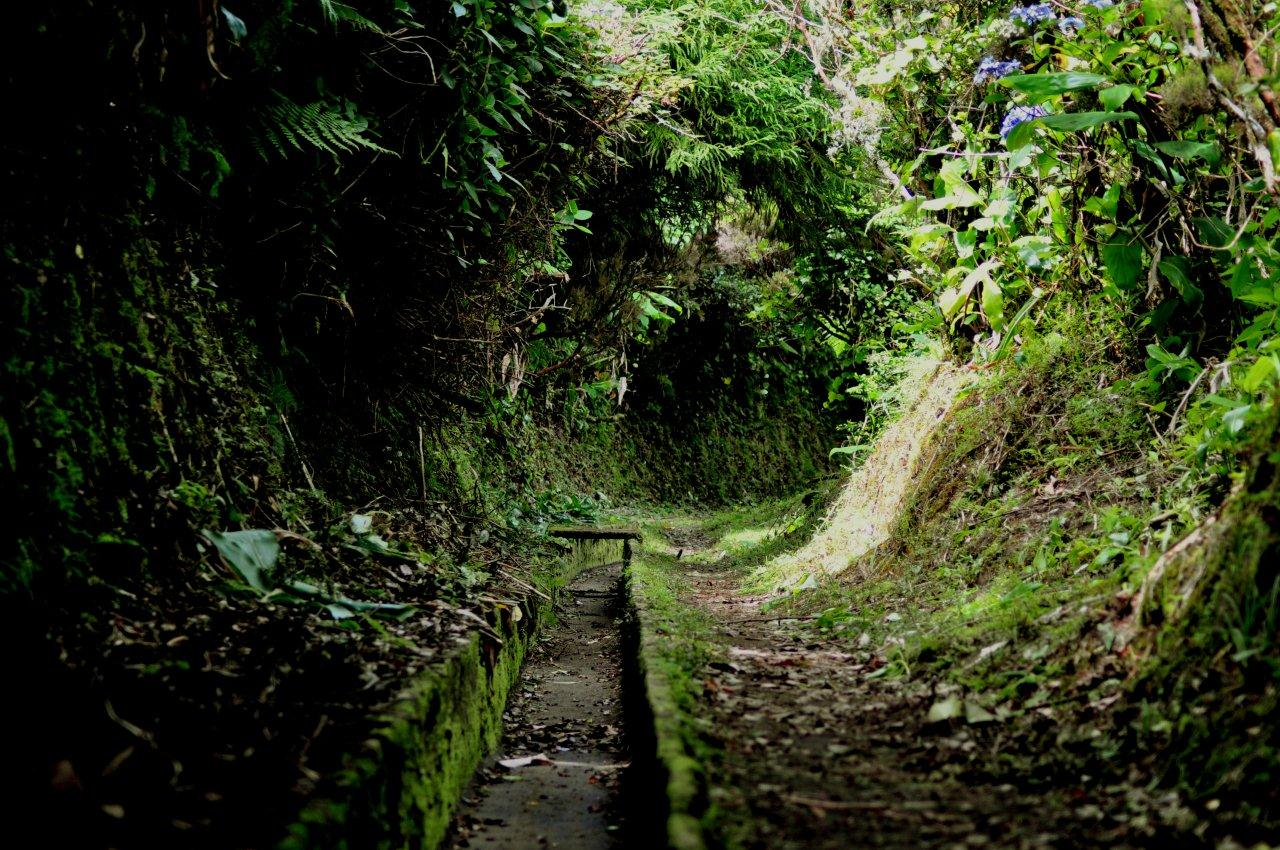
A levada near Cedros

- PR1FAI Capelo-Capelinhos, begins in the Forest Park of Capelo, at Trupes do Capelo (P1), and is a 7 kilometres (4.3 mi) extension that allows an ecologically and geologically diverse range of characteristics. The trail ends at the Interpretative Centre at the Capelinhos volcano, but runs through the ancient spatter cones responsible for the formation of the Capelo peninsula, as seen from the alignment of cones from the caldera to Capelinhos. At the beginning of the trail are views of Cabeço do Fogo (in the east), center of the first historical eruption on the island (in 1672), as well as the lava fields that hit the north and south coasts, the central caldera and Morro of Castelo Branco. To the north are the areas of Norte Pequeno, Fajã and Praia do Norte, affected by historic volcanism and seismicity associated with the eruptions of Cabeço do Fogo (1672-1673), Capelinhos (1957-1958) and Capelo in (in 1958).
- PR3FAI Levadas, beginning along a stretch of roadway, this 6 kilometres (3.7 mi) pedestrian trek is a low degree of difficulty. It is part of early 20th century engineering public works project, inaugurated in 1964, that took four years to be constructed (and seven years to plan). The levada (or aqueduct) is 10 kilometres (6.2 mi) long, of which only 6 kilometres (3.7 mi) are hikeable, and covers a range of 680 metres (2,230 ft) in altitude, and was used in hydroelectric power generation. Water was collected from area around Castelhano, Cabeço, Risco, Fajãs, Cabras, Guarda-Sol and Águas and channelled to a central reservoir, with the capacity to store 1,000 cubic metres (35,000 ft^{3}), then to a hydroelectric power generator in Varadouro. The trail is an opportunity to observe the Laurissilva, local bay leaf (Laurus azorica), sanguinho (Frangula azorica), Azorean laurel (Ilex azorica) and heather (Vaccinium cylindraceum). Typical birds in these areas include Eurasian woodcock (Scolopax rusticola), the common blackbird (Turdus merula azorensis), western Azores goldcrest (Regulus regulus inermis) and Madeiran chaffinch (Fringilla coelebes moreletti). The trail ends (at P11) alongside a debris field caused by landslide following the 1998 earthquake.
- PRC4FAI Caldeira, refers to the perimeter of the Caldera, approximately 7 kilometres (4.3 mi), is the beginning of a medium-difficulty trail, that encompasses the rim of the stratovolcano. This circular route around the crater rim begins and ends at the entrance to the tunnel leading to the scenic overlook. Located in the centre of the island of Faial, the Caldera has a diameter of 2 kilometres (1.2 mi) and 400 metres (1,300 ft) depth, covered in an exuberant mixture of vegetation, such as Laurissilva. The formation of the caldera resulted from a long process that was initiated 550 million years, with the last geological event occurring 1200 years ago.
- PR6FAI 10 Vulcões, considered the longest trail in the Azores, this trail extends 21 kilometres (13 mi), and connects three existing trail segments: the Caldera, Levadas and the Capelo-Capelinhos. Normally the trail begins from the caldera and extends through the ten principal volcanoes existing along the fissural alignment of Capelo. The biodiversity and geodiversity is a constant along the trail, and terminates at the Lighthouse of Capelinhos (the site of the Interpretative Centre of the Volcano of Capelinhos). Approximately a 1,000 kilometres (620 mi) change in altitude, this difference allows a variety of endemic species that includes ravines and canopies, in addition to different birds.

The Cabeço dos Trinta, the western extension of volcanic craters on the flanks of the caldera, is a basaltic cone. In addition to the trail the circles the cone, a tunnel permits access to the centre of the geological structure, which is covered in natural vegetation, such as heather (Erica azorica), holly (Ilex azorica), festuca tuff grasses (Festuca jubata), Daboecia (Daboecia azorica), Polypodium ferns (Polypodium azoricum), Tolpis azorica and Rubia agostinhoi.

Throughout the year there are also guided tours and trail circuit organized by the Nature Park commission, such as the Caminho do Baleeiros, a circuit dedicated to the whalers who lived in Capelo, before the volcanic eruption.

=== Fauna ===
Many of the islands bird species are found within this zone, including many species endemic to the Azores, such as Azores chaffinch (Fringilla coelebs moreletti), the western Azores goldcrest (Regulus regulus azoricus), and the saffron finch (Serinus canaria), in addition to the local common buzzard (Buteo buteo rothschildi). The caldera is one of the better locations to explore and observe the natural vegetation of the Portuguese islands, marked by laurissilva forests and humid climates. A pedestrian trail to the caldera floor, permits a three-and-a-half-hour journey at a medium-to-high level of difficulty, while encountering a botanical diversity that has been little influenced by human imprints.

The Faial Caldera Nature Reserve is part of the Natura 2000 network, and classified as a Protection Zone for wild birds and an area of Communitarian Interest, along with a member of the Ramsar Convention for conservation and sustainable utilisation of wetlands.

The semi-urbanized walking trail along Monte da Guia lasts 1.8 kilometres (or one-and-a-half hours) around an area that was classified in 1980 as a protected area. Also protected by the Natura 2000 network (as a Zone of Special Conservation), the area is a meeting place for both marine animals, migratory and endemic bird species. If visited during the summer or spring, marine birds such as the Calonectris shearwaters (Calonectris diomedea borealis) or common tern (Sterna hirundo) are common.

== Interpretive Centres ==
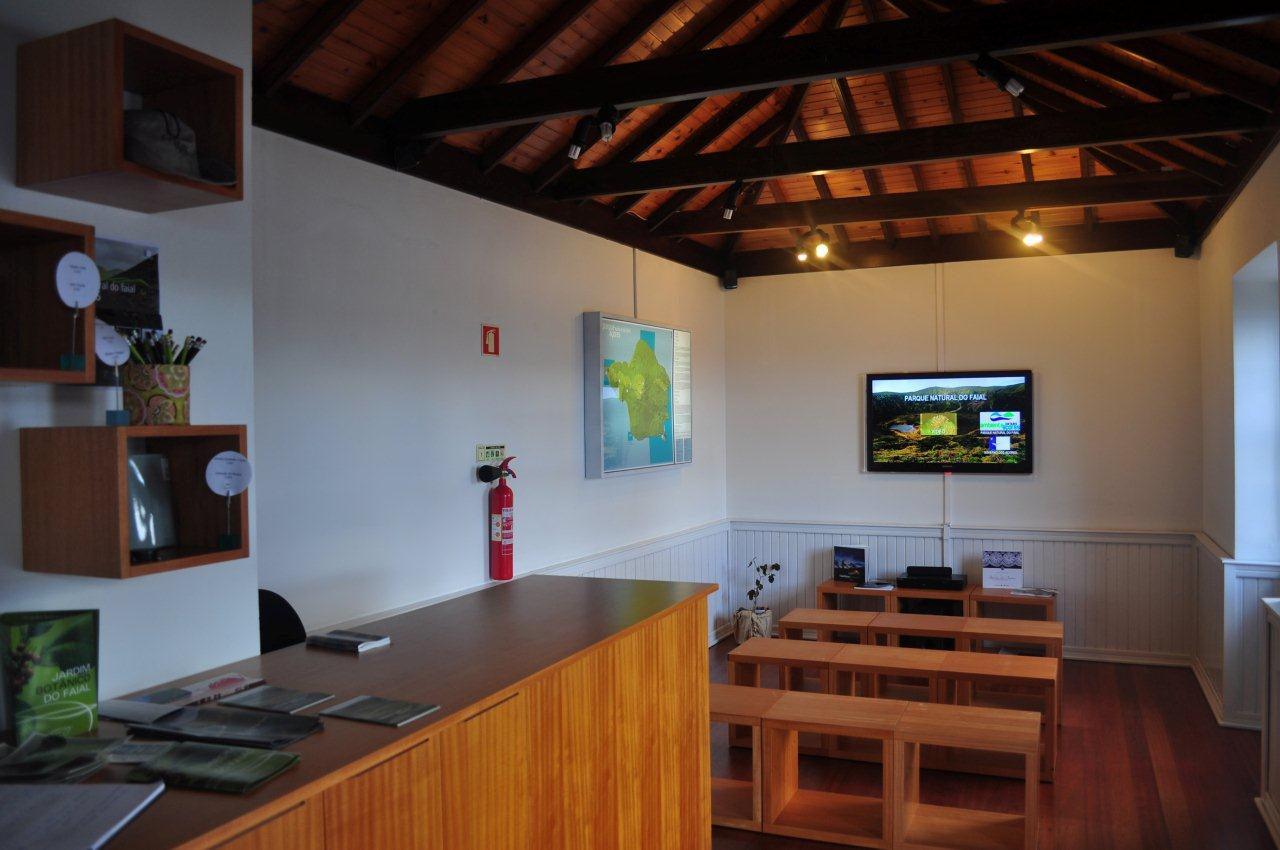
Interior of the Casa do Parque Interpretive Centre

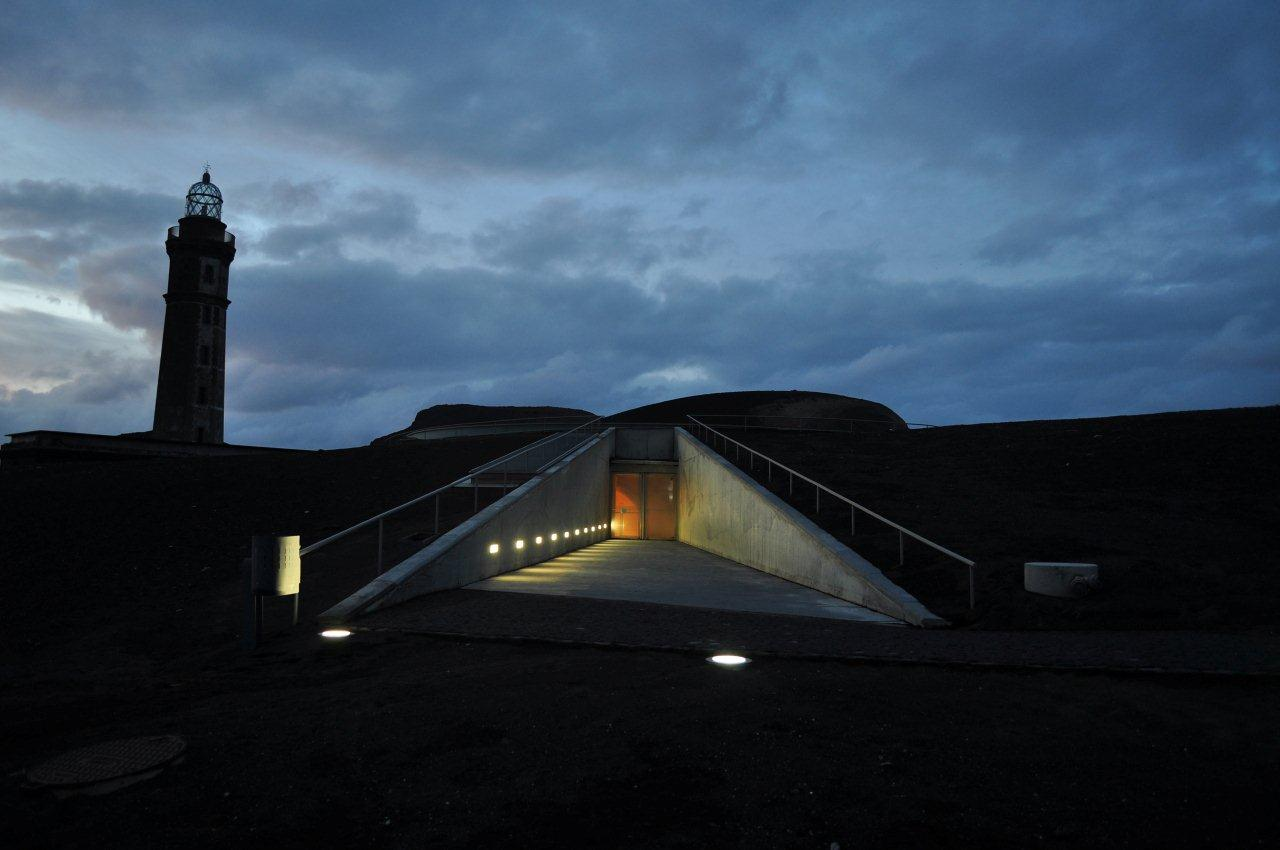
The CIVC Centro de Interpretação do Vulcão dos Capelinhos, one of the ex-libris of the island of Faial

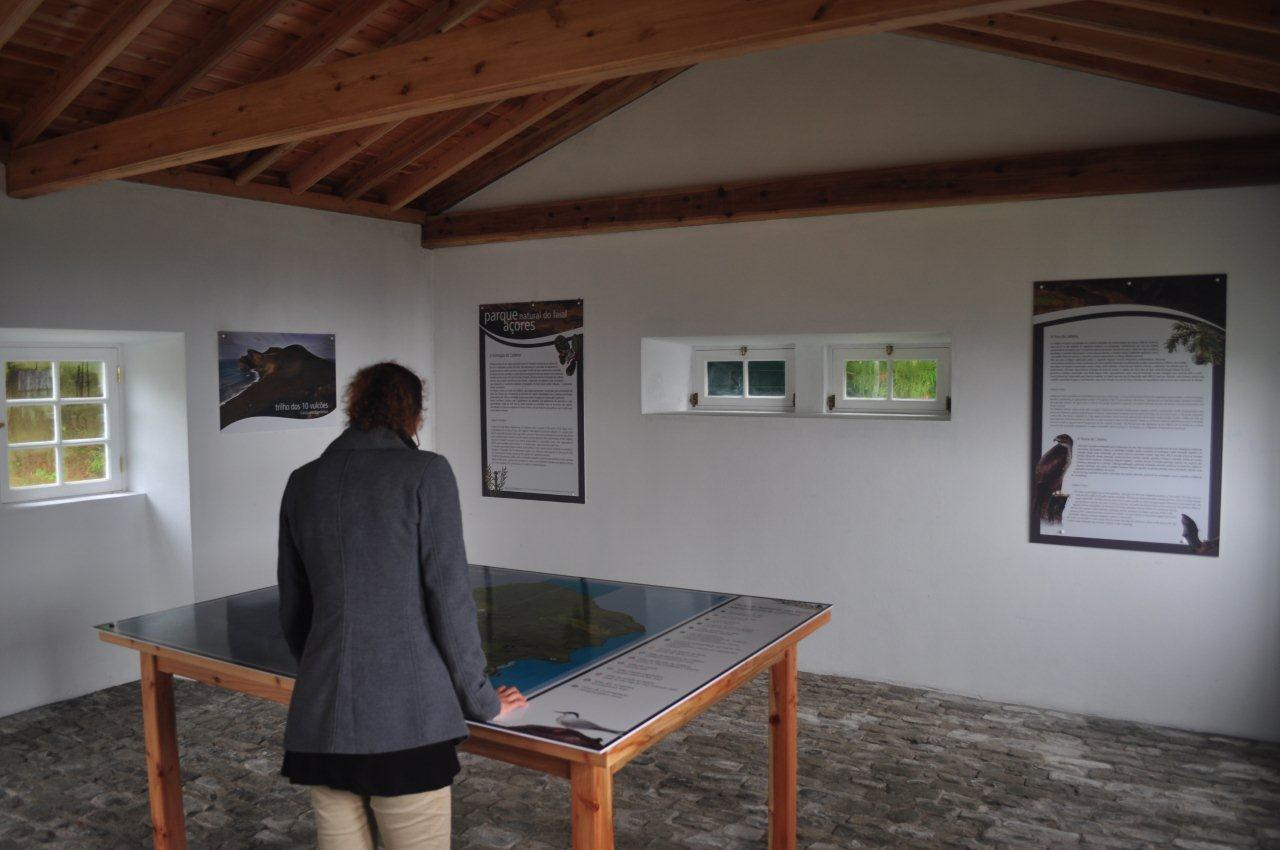
Casa do Cantoneiro, a former warehouse and storage space, now interpretative centre

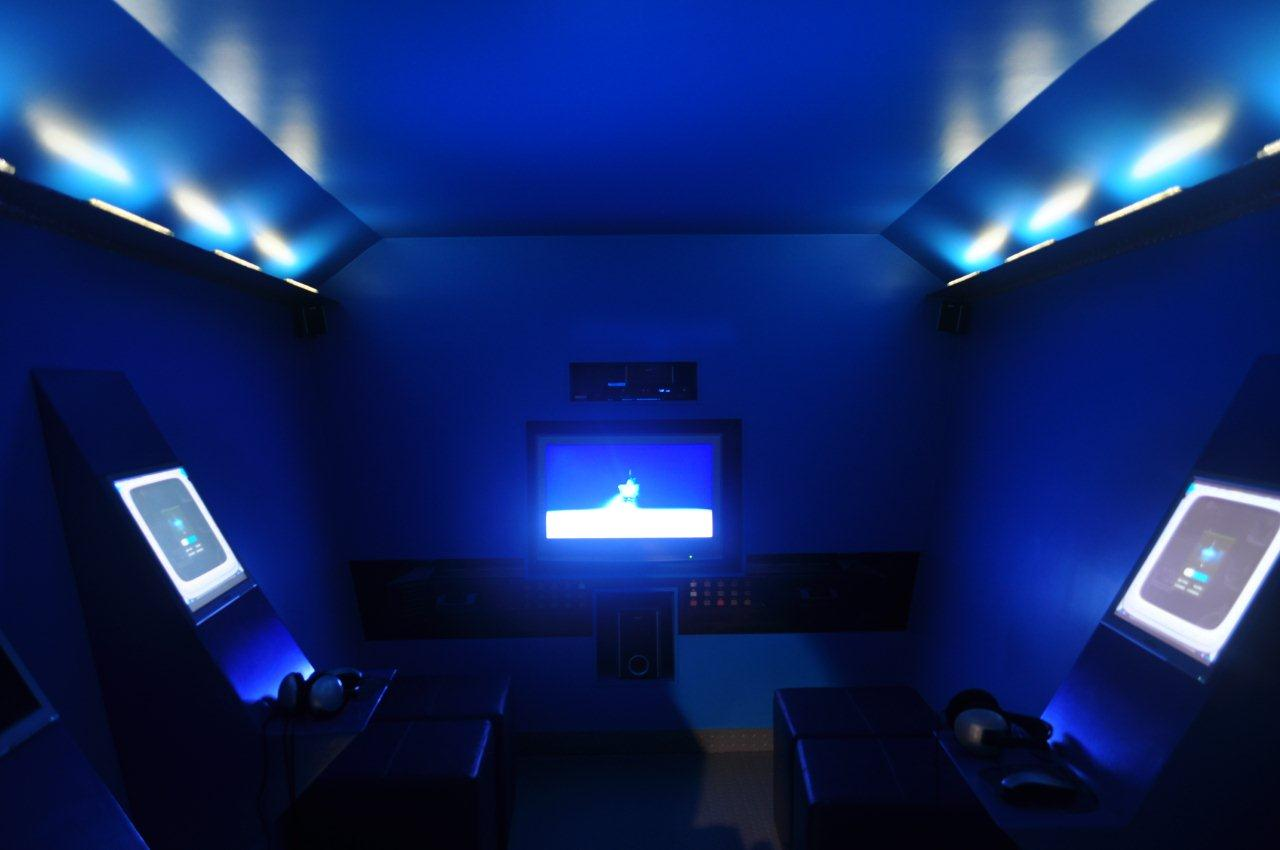
The Virtual Simulator, in the Fabrica da Baleia permits the exploration of the waters of the Azores

The main reception area, called the Casa do Parque (the Park House) functions as the entrance to the Faial Nature Park, and provides information on the Park's resources, interpretative centres, trails, lookouts and associated activities.

The Capelinhos Volcano Interpretative Centre (Portuguese: Centro de Interpretação do Vulcão dos Capelinhos, also known as CIVC) permits visitors the opportunity to learn about the geological phenomenons and volcanism that gave origin to the Azores, and specifically the Faial. Inaugurated in 2008, the Centre integrates the geological history along Costa da Nau with the historical lighthouse destroyed during the 1957-58 Capelinhos Volcano. This event resulted in a barren lunar landscape, which is only broken by the CIVC; the ash landscape extended to the edge of the community of Capelo, and has only recently begun to recuperate from the event.

To present the diversity of endemic and local plants, the Faial Nature Park also integrated the existing Faial Botanical Garden (Portuguese: Jardim Botânico do Faial), into its authority. The Garden, which was remodelled and expanded in 2011 provides both open-air displays and visitor's centre in order to identify and educate the public as to the native plant species common to Faial. This includes a small trail that winds through the park to highlight various shrubs, trees, flowering plants and medicinal species used by original settlers, as well as exotic species, such as the local orchids.

Pertaining to the Secretaria Regional do Ambiente e do Mar (English: Regional Secretariat of the Environment and Ocean), the historical Fábrica da Baleia (English: Whaling Factory) in the Entre-Montes area between Monte da Guia and Monte Escuro in Horta. The centre, actually the factory used for the butchering and processing of whale oil, displays many of the mechanisms and equipment used to dissect, cannibalize and harvest the prized oil, including boats, spears and tanks. In addition, the site offers information on Atlantic whales captured in the waters of the Azores, a virtual simulator to depths of 3000 metres, and is the location of the Observatório do Mar dos Açores (English: Azores Ocean Observatory).

Another interpretive centre, the Casa do Cantoneiro was recuperated in 2011, but was used as a warehouse for materials used in the construction and maintenance of the roadways, as well as serving as a shelter for workers during storms. Today, its function is as an interpretive centre for Faial's Caldera (Portuguese: Caldeira), identifying the flora, fauna and geology of the dormant stratovolcano that makes-up the island of Faial. Also near the crater, the Casa de Apoio da Caldeira (English: Support House of the Caldera), also restored, has become a trail centre, to assist hikers interested in realizing trips within the Nature Reserve (which includes the Caldera, its perimeter and the trail 10 Vulcões).

== Partnerships ==
The Parque Natural do Faial has also developed promotional partnerships with tourism and local businesses to promote the park and natural diversity of the region. For example, at the re-opening of the Faial Botanical Garden (22 May 2011) the Casa D'Avila tea manufacturer, was highlighted during the events, which used locally grown aromatics. As their president (António Ávila) noted, "the Nature Park provided us with a few plants [Erva cidreira, Erva Princípe, Hortelã e Neveda] that we began to produce commercially...and we will advance with other species in the future."

== See also ==
Protected areas of the Azores
