= Nature Park of Terceira =

Protected area of the island of Terceira

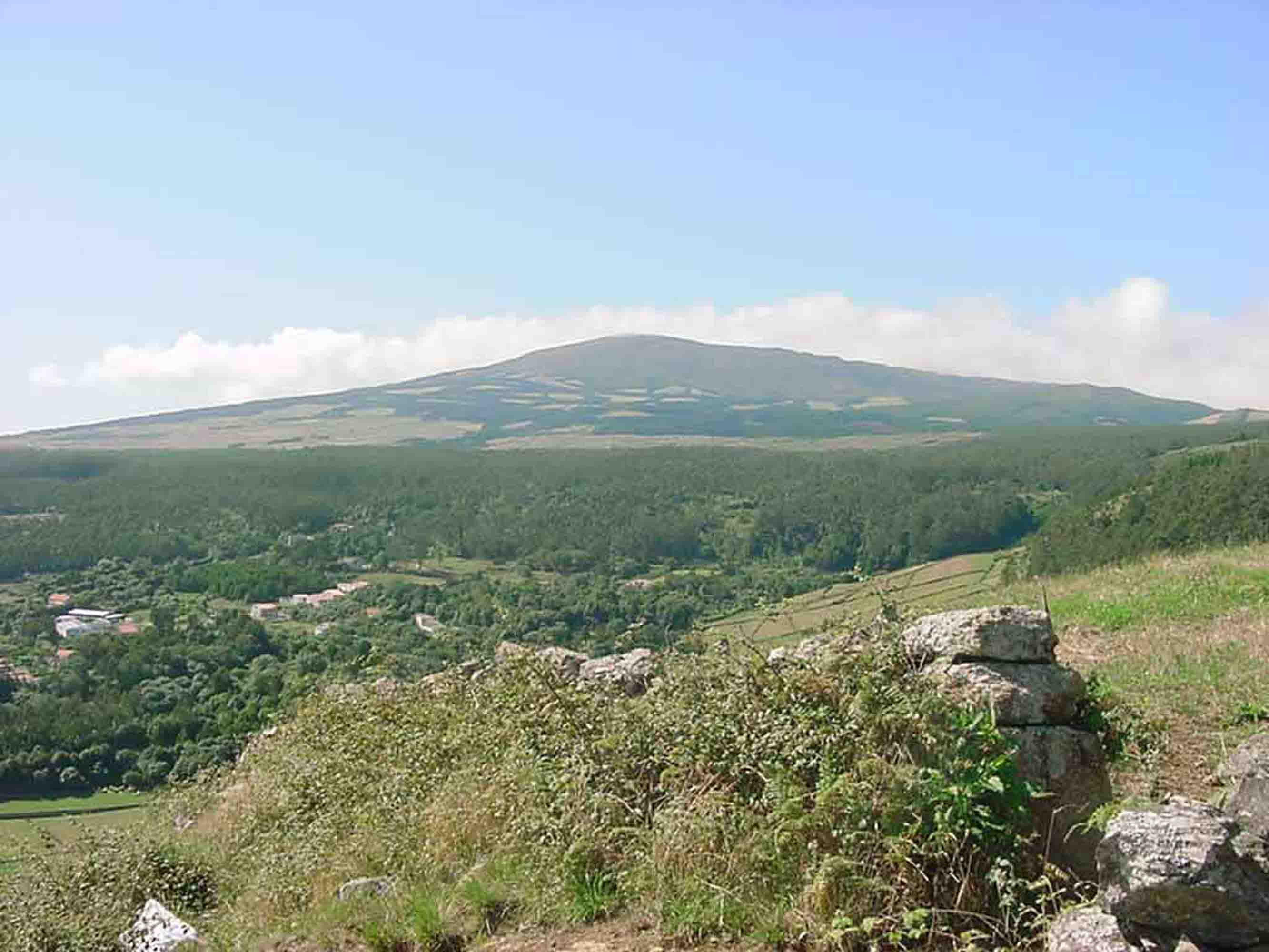
- The tallest point on the island of Terceira, and centerpiece of the Terceira Nature Park

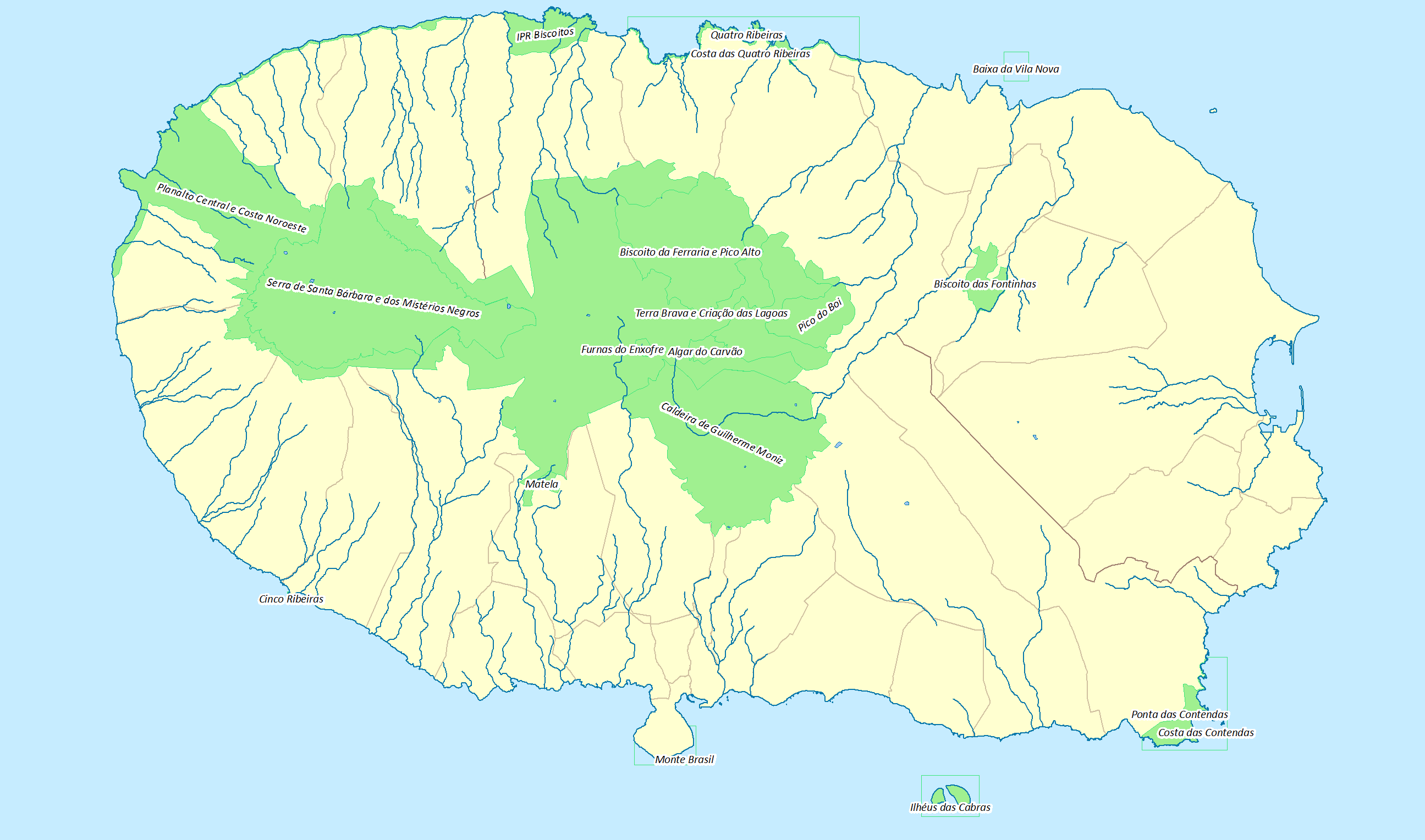
- The location of the various protected areas that constitute the Nature Park of Terceira
- Location: Terceira, Central, Azores, Portugal
- Coordinates: 38°42′25.39″N 27°12′12″W
- Length: 30.11 km (18.71 mi)
- Width: 19.5 km (12.1 mi)
- Area: 400.28 km^{2} (154.55 sq mi)
- Elevation: 500 m (1,600 ft)
- Established: Decreto Legislativo Regional n.º 11/2011/A
- Operator: Secretário Regional do Ambiente e do Mar
- Website: Terceira Nature Park

The Nature Park of Terceira (Portuguese: Parque Natural da Terceira), or simply the Terceira Nature Park (PNTER) developed from the intention of better managing the protected areas of the island of Terceira, and was instituted by the "Secretaria Regional do Ambiente e do Mar" (English: Regional Secretariate for the Environment and Oceans), of the Autonomous Regional Government of the Azores. It includes an area of approximately 22% of the island classified under the International Union for Conservation of Nature's Nature Reserve designation.

== History ==
The Terceira Nature Park was established by legislative decree No.11/2011/A, on 20 April 2011, which reformulated the juridical classification, management and administration of the Azorean areas of protection.

Local environmentalists participated in the first bat census between 2–7 July 2012, in an area that covered 20 different localities. It was part of the Mais Endémicas: plantar o futuro (More Endemics: Planting the Future), which involved the inventory and monitorization of bat species, in collaboration with the ICNB. In addition, training was provided in order to allow participants to identify the animals not only by morphological characteristics, but also vocalization. The analysis determined that of the four species registered in the Azores, there exists only two common species: the Azorean bat (Nyctalus azoreum) and Madeiran bat (Pipistrellus maderensis)".

On 19 July 2011, the director of the Nature Park accompanied by project coordinator of Geoparque Açores received an evaluation committee from the Rede Europeia de Geoparques (EGN) and an observer from UNESCO. During that day, in addition to visiting the historic centre of Angra (which included the Church of the Misericórdia, Monte Brasil), the group evaluating the Terceira Park visited, the Algar do Carvão, the Furnas do Enxofre, Guilherme Moniz volcano and Lajes Graben (five of the eight principal geosites on the island). Between 15 and 19 July 2011, the evaluation committee also visited five other island in order build links with the Azorean archipelago, visit other sites, experience local traditional, education and geo-tourism activities, as well as meet with the local population.

Visiting the Furnas do Enxofre in 2011, the Secretário Regional do Ambiente e do Mar, Álamo Meneses, inaugurated the forest ranger station on the summit of the Serra de Santa Bárbara, which would serve as the first interpretive centre for the Park. In addition to obtaining information about the park, the site would host photographic exhibitions and display various species of endemic flora and fauna. In addition, the regional secretary inaugurated the new pedestrian trail in Biscoitos, a trail that followed the vineyards of the Paisagem Protegida da Vinha dos Biscoitos (Protected Landscape of the Biscoitos Vineyards), using many of the old channels and accesses to wine properties. The trail allows hikers to follow the ancestral routes used by wine-growers that helped to develop the economic activity of the island.

== Geography ==
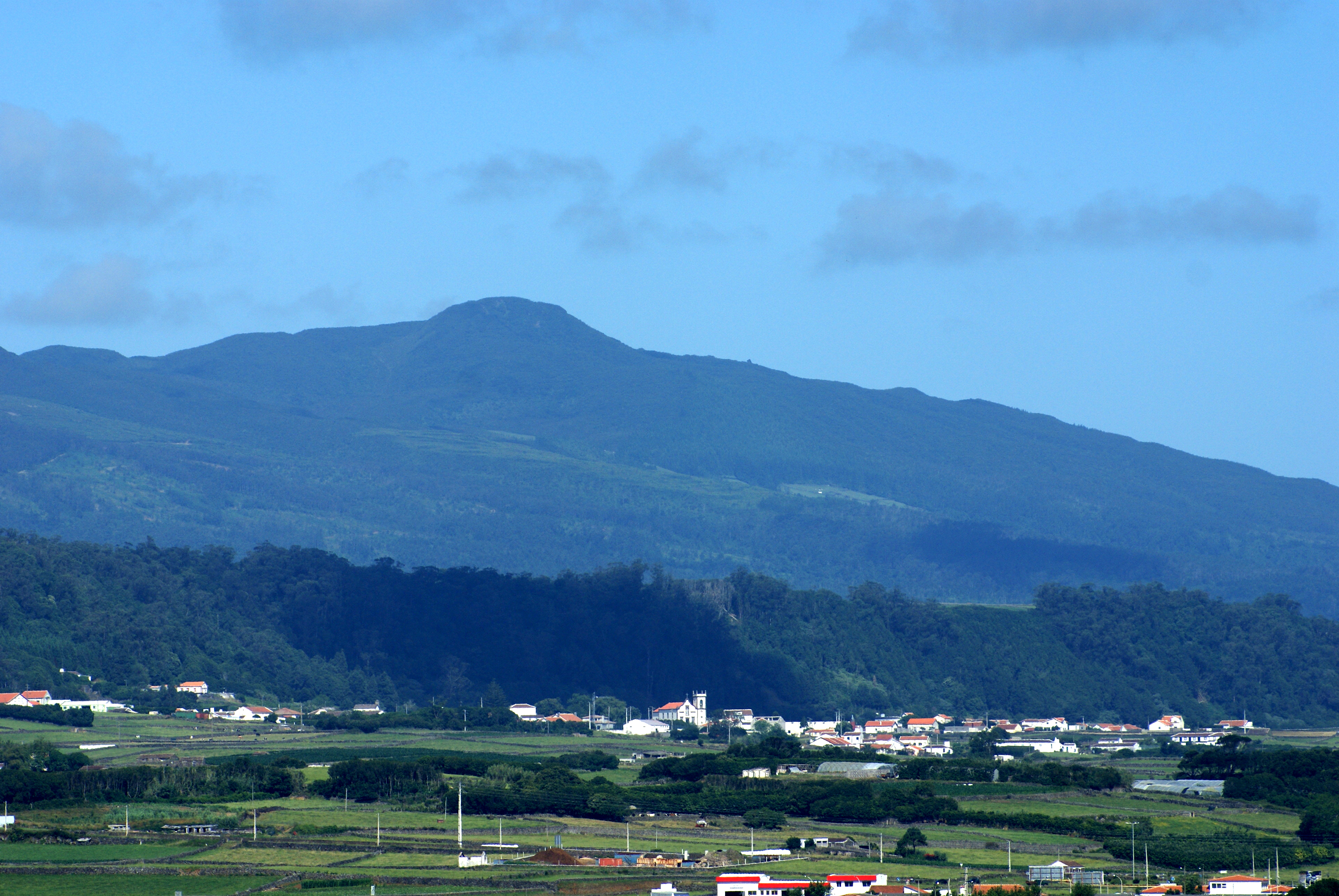
Pico Alto, an integral part of the central Nature Reserve of Biscoito da Ferraria and Pico Alto

Approximately 22% of Terceira's land area, or 400.28 square kilometres (154.55 mi^{2}), was integrated into the nature park, in order to create conditions for a coherent and integrated management plan. The park is guided by the principals of conservation that includes delimited spaces for nature, humans landscape use and natural resources exploitation, based on scientific criteria/guidelines established for the classification of environments at the international, national, regional and local levels.

=== Classified areas ===
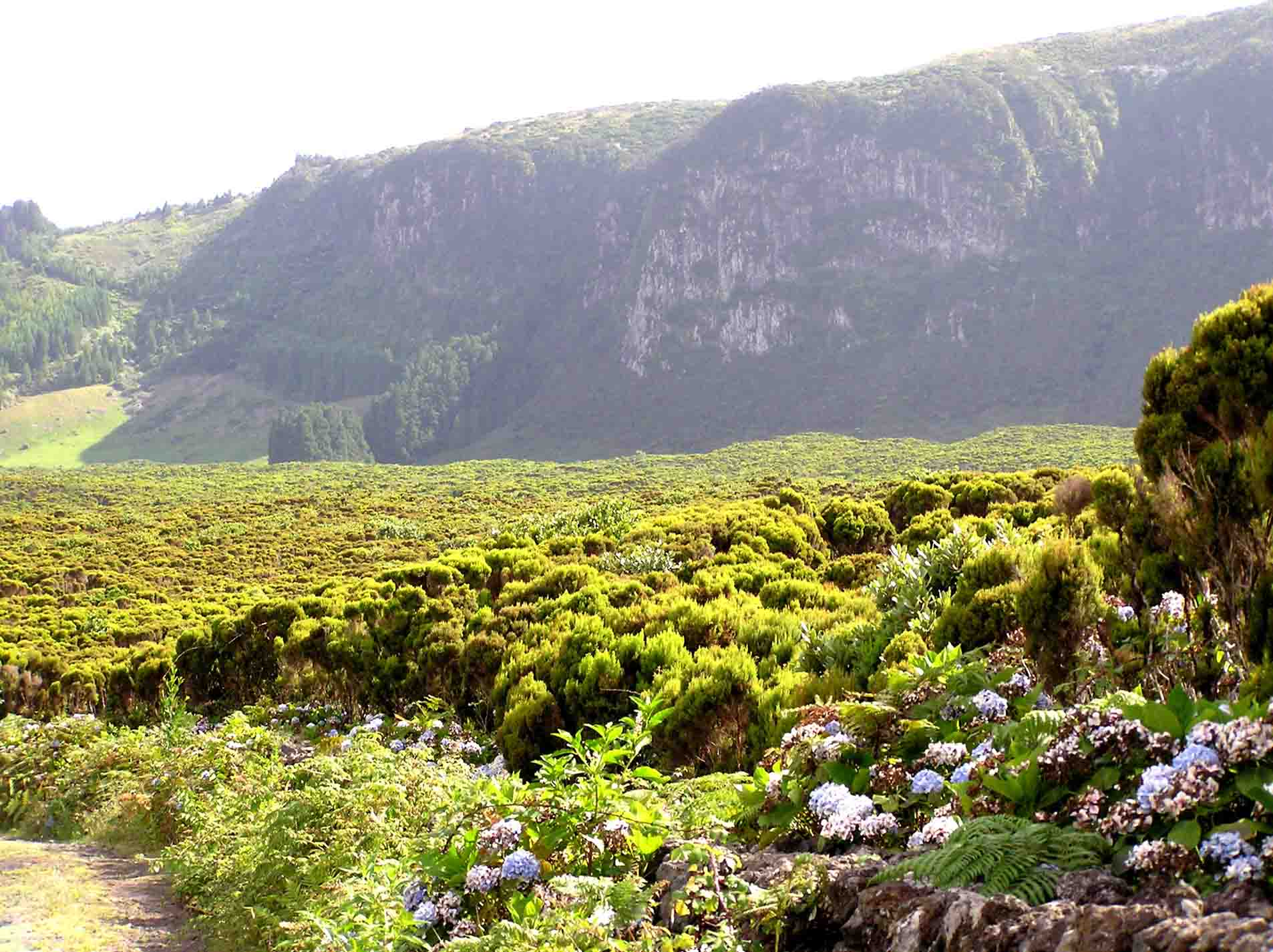
The shrub bush of the Protected Resource Management Area of Guilherme Moniz Caldera, showing the crater rim

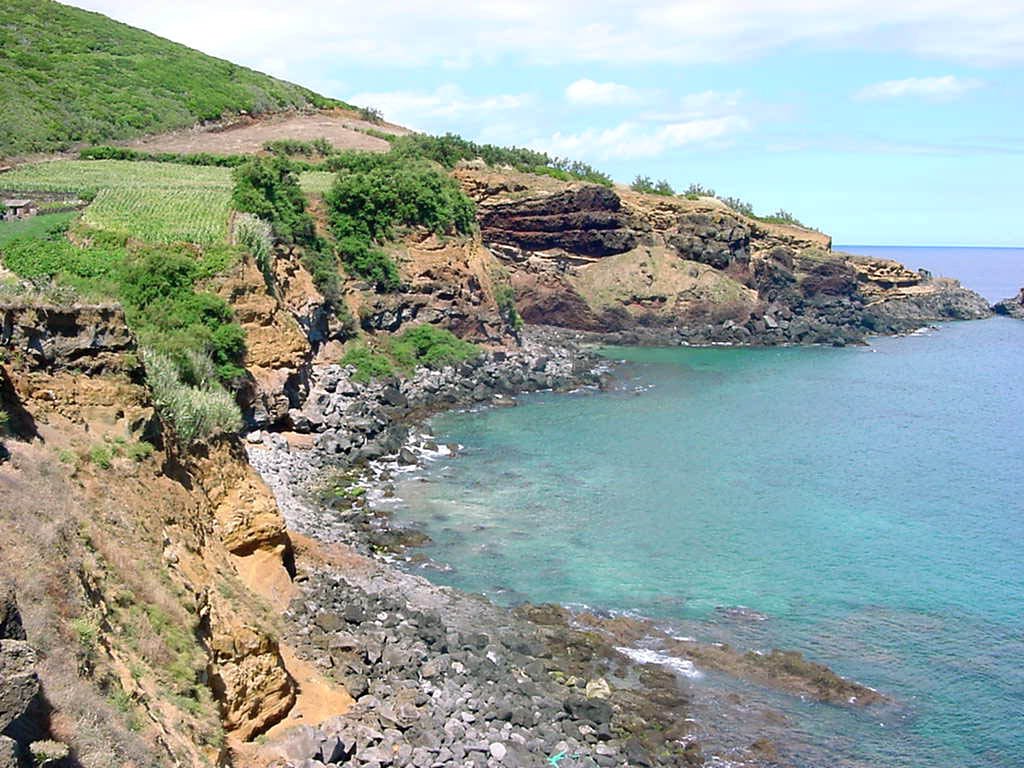
The shoreline of the Protected Landscape of Contendas Point

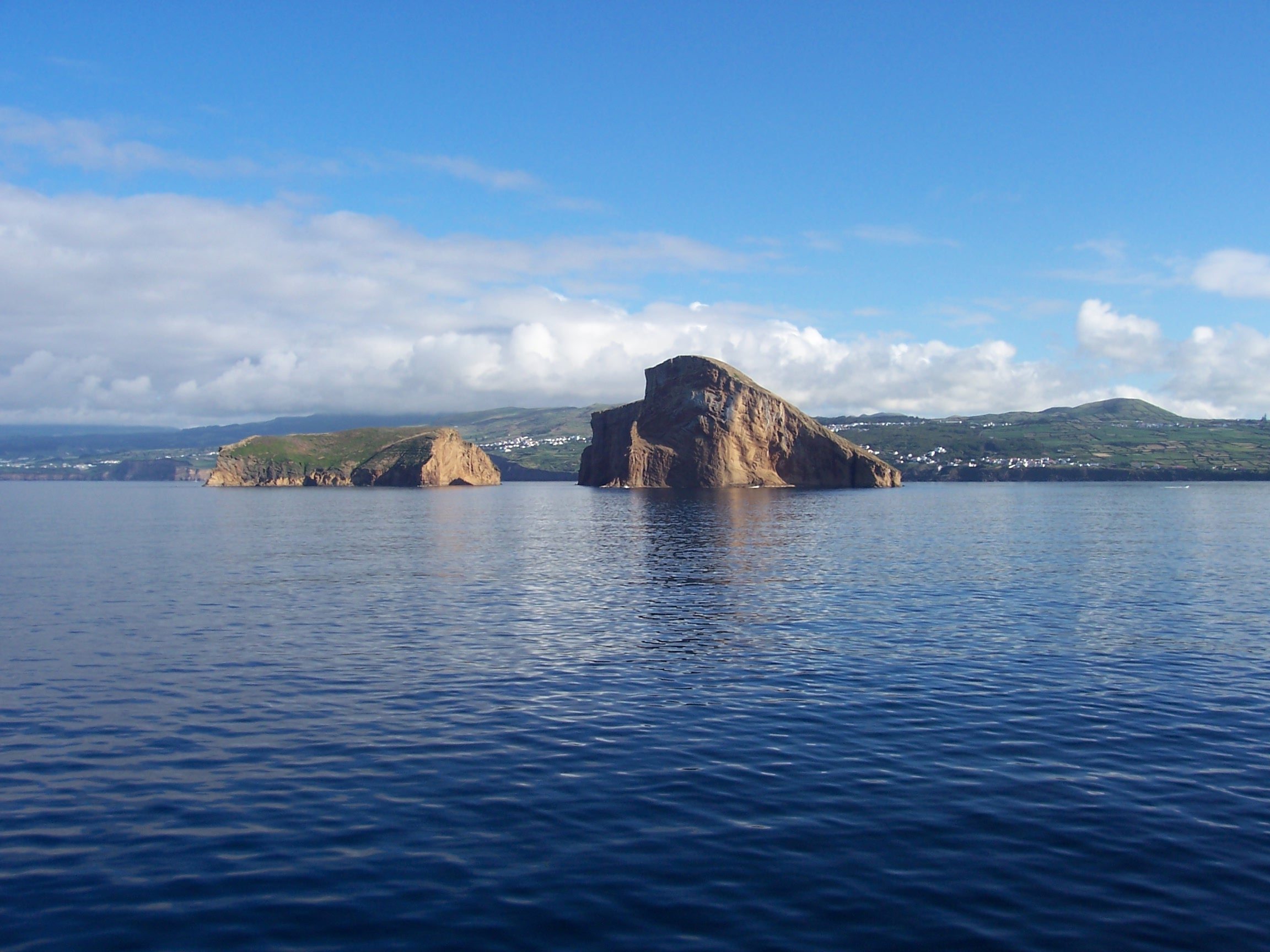
The coastline and Cabra islets, which are the primary elements of the Protected Landscape of the Cabras Islet

The Terceira Nature Park is actually a dispersed reserve that encompasses several individual areas of protection.

==== Nature reserves ====
Those areas classified as Nature Reserves (Portuguese: Reserva Natural):

- [TER01] Nature Reserve of the Santa Bárbara and Mistérios Negros Massif (Portuguese: Reserva Natural da Serra de Santa Bárbara e dos Mistérios Negros), defined by the presence of a large and well conserved patch of natural vegetation, with a great diversity of species, habitats and protected ecosystems, located within the slopes of the double caldera and the trachytic domes, one of which was responsible for the eruption of April 1761.
- [TER02] Nature Reserve of Biscoito da Ferraria and Pico Alto (Portuguese: Reserva Natural do Biscoito da Ferraria e Pico Alto)
- [TER03] Nature Reserve of Terra Brava and Criação das Lagoas (Portuguese: Reserva Natural da Terra Brava e Criação das Lagoas)

==== Natural monuments ====
Specific Natural Monuments (Portuguese: Monumentos Naturais) protected by law for their paigestic or natural landscape include:

- [TER04] Nature Reserve of the Algar do Carvão (Portuguese: Monumento Natural do Algar do Carvão)
- [TER05] Nature Reserve of the Furnas do Enxofre (Portuguese: Monumento Natural das Furnas do Enxofre)

==== Protected areas ====
Areas classified for Protection and Management of Habitats or Species (Portuguese: Área Protegida para a Gestão de Habitats ou Espécies):

- [TER06] Protected Landscape of Contendas Point (Portuguese: Área Protegida para a Gestão de Habitats ou Espécies da Ponta das Contendas)
- [TER07] Protected Landscape of the Cabras Islet (Portuguese: Área Protegida para a Gestão de Habitats ou Espécies dos Ilhéus das Cabras)
- [TER08] Protected Landscape of Matela (Portuguese: Área Protegida para a Gestão de Habitats ou Espécies da Matela)
- [TER09] Protected Landscape of the Biscoito das Fontinhas (Portuguese: Área Protegida para a Gestão de Habitats ou Espécies do Biscoito das Fontinhas)
- [TER10] Protected Landscape of the Quarto Ribeiras Coast (Portuguese: Área Protegida para a Gestão de Habitats ou Espécies da Costa das Quatro Ribeiras)
- [TER11] Protected Landscape of the Central Plateau and Northwest Coast (Portuguese: Área Protegida para a Gestão de Habitats ou Espécies do Planalto Central e Costa Noroeste)
- [TER12] Protected Landscape of Pico do Boi (Portuguese: Área Protegida para a Gestão de Habitats ou Espécies do Pico do Boi)

==== Protected landscapes ====
Areas classified as Protected Landscapes (Portuguese: Paisagem Protegida):

- [TER13] Protected Landscape of the Biscoitos Vineyards (Portuguese: Área de Paisagem Protegida das Vinhas dos Biscoitos)

==== Resource areas ====
Areas classified for the Management of Resources (Portuguese: Gestão de Recursos):

- [TER14] Protected Resource Management Area of Guilherme Moniz Caldera (Portuguese: Área Protegida de Gestão de Recursos da Caldeira de Guilherme Moniz)
- [TER15] Protected Marine Resource Management Area of Quatro Ribeiras (Portuguese: Área Marinha Protegida de Gestão de Recursos das Quatro Ribeiras)
- [TER16] Protected Marine Resource Management Area of the Contendas Coast (Portuguese: Área Marinha Protegida de Gestão de Recursos da Costa das Contendas)
- [TER17] Protected Marine Resource Management Area of the Cabras Islet (Portuguese: Área Marinha Protegida de Gestão de Recursos dos Ilhéus das Cabras)
- [TER18] Protected Marine Resource Management Area of Cinco Ribeiras (Portuguese: Área Marinha Protegida de Gestão de Recursos das Cinco Ribeiras)
- [TER19] Protected Marine Resource Management Area of the Vila Nova Downtown (Portuguese: Área Marinha Protegida de Gestão de Recursos da Baixa da Vila Nova)
- [TER20] Protected Marine Resource Management Area of Monte Brasil (Portuguese: Área Marinha Protegida de Gestão de Recursos do Monte Brasil), constituted for the classification of the marine environment for the management of the resources on Monte Brasil, due to the presence of natural habitats, namely submarine grottos and semi-submersed regions, associated with an elevated marine biodiversity in fauna.

== See also ==
- Protected areas of the Azores
