= Protected areas of the Azores =

The Protected Areas of the Azores (Portuguese: Rede Regional de Áreas Protegidas) are the basic administrative-territorial and conservation structures in the archipelago of the Azores and the surrounding oceans. The areas integrate the entirety of the Azores within its Exclusive Economic Zone, as well as the surrounding waters, under the international agreements and conventions. The network realizes the categorization of management for protected areas adopted by the International Union for Conservation of Nature (IUCN), adapting it to the specific geographical, environmental, cultural and political-administrative territory of the archipelago.

== History ==
The first legal document identified to create a protected area in the Azores, was Decree 78/72 (7 March 1972), which created the Reserva Integral da Caldeira do Faial (Integrated Reserve of the Faial Caldera), which was closely followed by Decree 79/72 (8 March 1972), that established the Reserva Integral da Montanha da ilha do Pico (Integrated Reserve of the Mountain of the Island of Pico). After a hiatus of two years, Decree 152/74 (15 April 1974) was published that created on the island of São Miguel the Reserva da Lagoa do Fogo (Reserve of Lagoa do Fogo), which was subject to forestry service guidelines along its perimeter. These regulatory frameworks were in keeping with those establishing the National Park of Peneda-Gêres and other national reserves, resulting from the application of Decree 9/70 (19 June 1970) These laws, approved under the juridic regime of the Estado Novo government, occurred at a time when the Azores did not have its own political autonomy statute, and were the only interventions made by the central government in the protection of areas in the Azores.

The first regional/local measures to protect the environment were introduced by Regional Decree 12/77/A (14 June 1977), which established measures to protect the lakes, ravines and springs in the archipelago. The document, which was a pioneer at the time, included several rules to protect the environment and retroactively included older measures. The creation of the first protected area under this new regime established the Protected Landscape of Monte da Guia., and the first nature reserve, the Reserva Natural da Lagoa do Fogo (Nature Reserve of Lagoa do Fogo) under Regional Decree 10/82/A (18 June 1982), while the caldera on Faial and the mountain of Pico were reclassified.

The protected areas continued to be created in an ad hoc basis, even as the national Decree 613/76 (27 July 1976) revoked the older 9/70 law (19 June 1970) and instituted a new regime that allowed for the creation for national parks, which was never applied in the Azores. The first grande measure to protect habitats occurred with the publication of Regional Legislative Decree 15/87/A (24 July 1987), that established the legal framework for the creation and functioning of forest reserves. This was a decisive law, since the majority of the zones of conservation fell within the jurisdiction of the forest services. This law helped to put into practice many of the extensive reservas florestais naturais (natural forest reserves), resulting in the preservation of areas that today constitute the nucleus of the Island Nature Parks on each island. It was followed by Regional Legislative Decree 21/93/A (23 December 1993), which applied to the Azores the same jurisdictional regime established in national Decree 19/93 (23 January 1993), the Rede Nacional de Áreas Protegidas (National Network of Protected Areas). More than an adaption of the national regulations, it created the institutional structure that would give rise to Azorean protected areas, resulting in a reclassification of existing areas. Unfortunately, there were problems with the scheme, since the codification was not literally adaptable to the insular nature of the archipelago and the autonomous institutions that existed, nor the forest regime and reserves created ad hoc in intervening years.

Consequently, the creation of the Natura 2000 network did not accompany advancements on the continent, nor were Azorean areas integrated into existing classified sites of community interest. Published in 1998, a proposed list of communitarian important sites (under resolution 20/98, 5 February) was approved in 2001, resulting in the first list of Biogeographic Region of Macaronesia. His had no immediate change in the legal statute of areas included, although indirectly, by Regional Legislative Decree 20/2006/A (6 June 2006), it did approve the sector plan for the Natura 2000 scheme in the Azores.

The global framework for protected areas, utilizing re-classified standards that included diverse unified typologies was fixed in Regional Legislative Decree 15/2007/A (25 June 2007), which preceded the revision of the network of protected area and their classification. That legal framework permitted the subsequent creation of the nine nature parks in the Azores and the reclassification, in accordance with the established IUCN classifications, of protected areas.

Regional Legislative Decree 15/2012/A (2 April 2012), which approved the legal regime for conservation of nature and biodiversity, transcluded the Azorean legal order, the Birds Directive and the Habitats Directive, while repealing the Regional Legislative Decree 15/2007/A (25 June 2007), incorporating the new legal framework for the Protected Areas of the Azores.

== Context ==
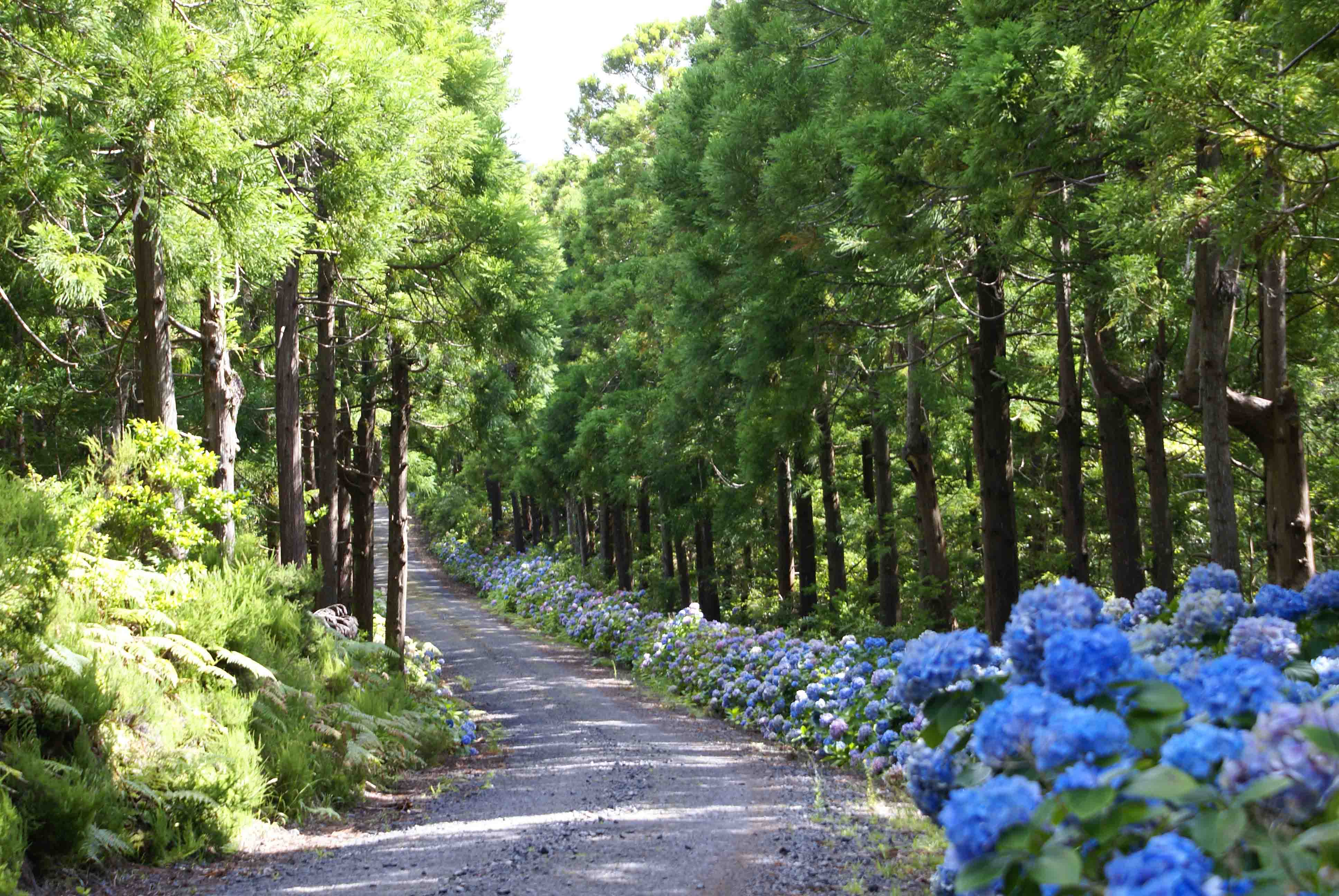
The Forest Park of Mata da Serreta, in the western corner of the Nature Park of Terceira

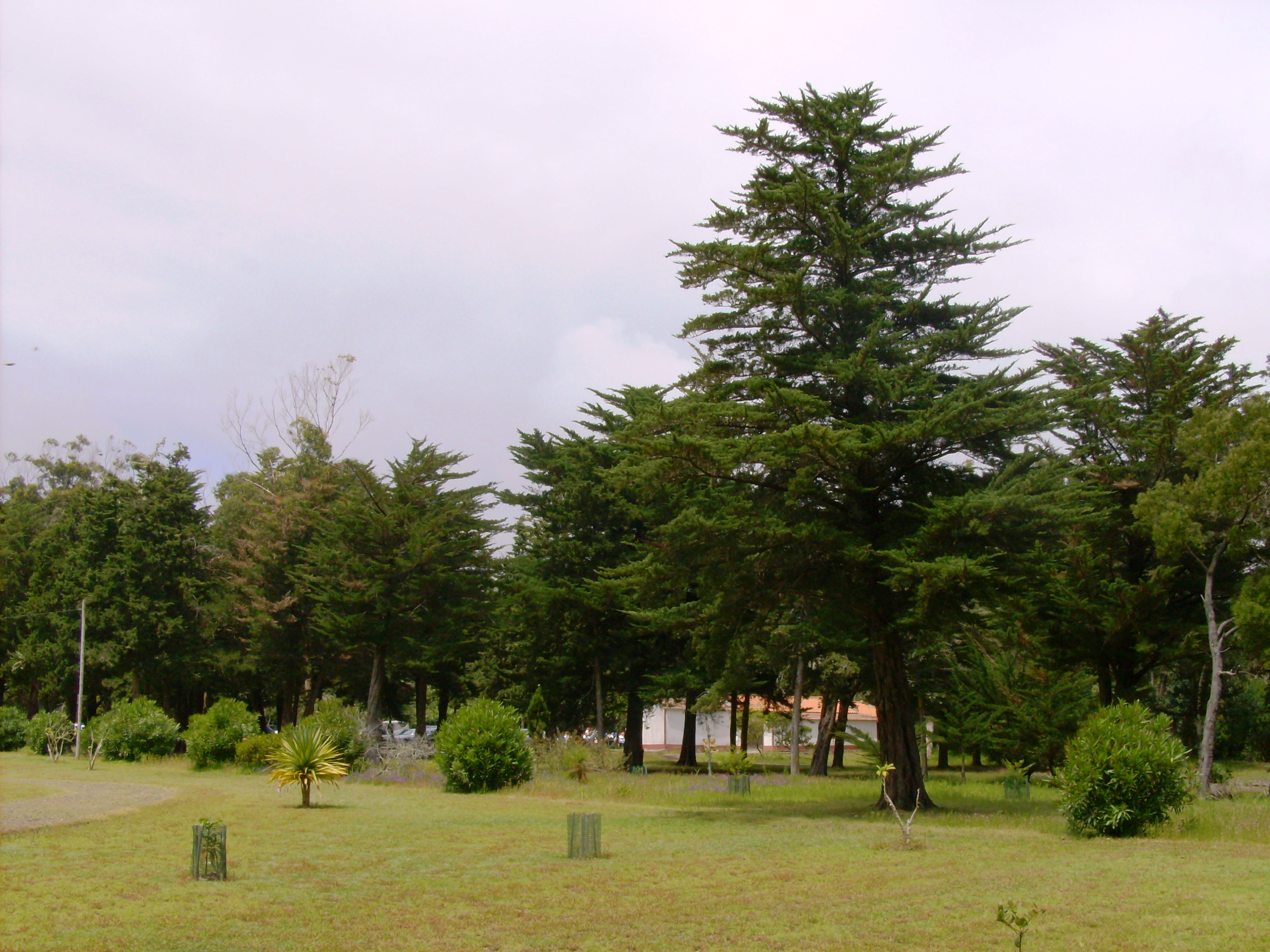
The Recreational Forest Reserve of Valverde, on the outskirts of Vila do Porto, on Santa Maria Island

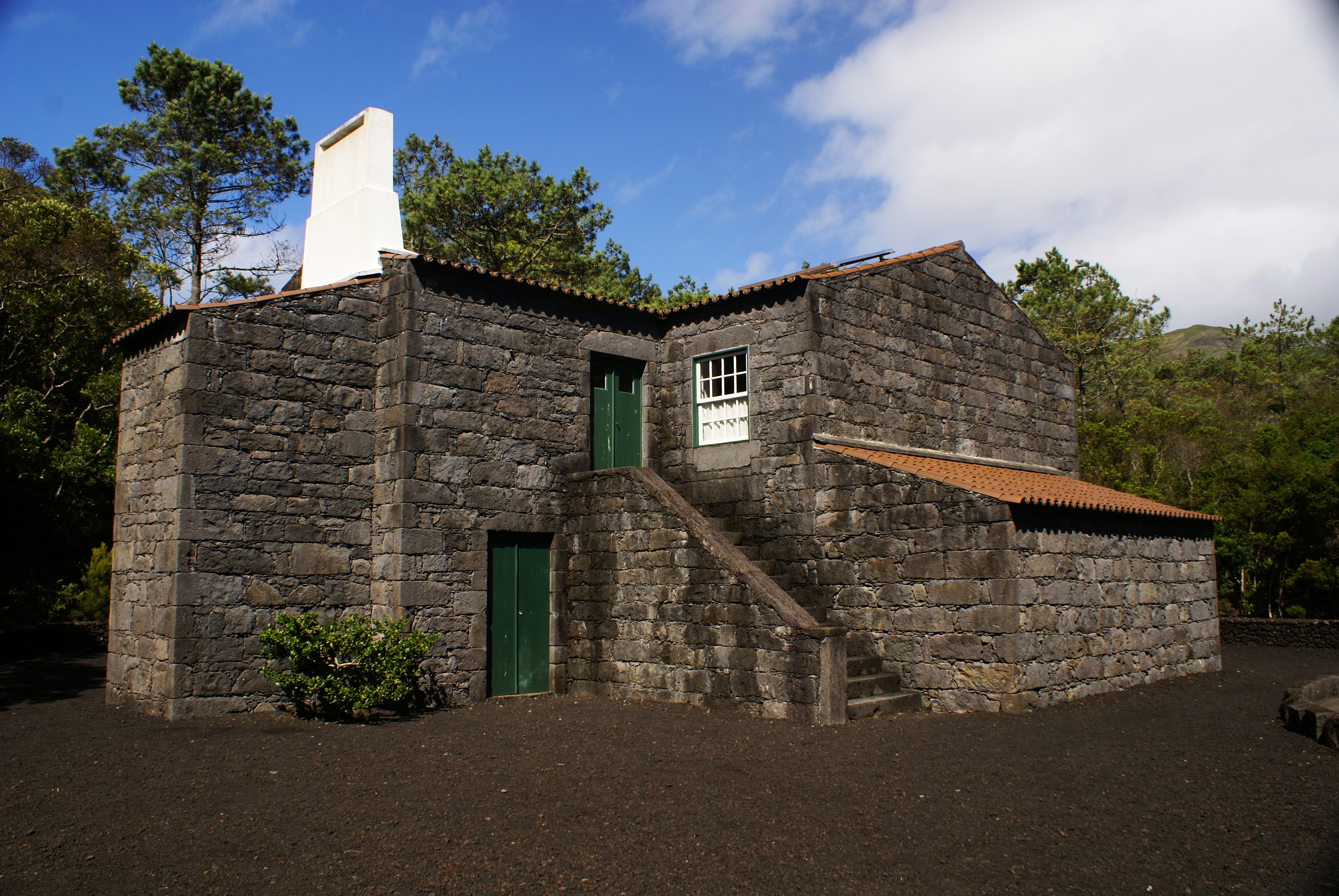
Some of the parks in the Azores integrate not only environmental elements but also human spaces, such as this traditional home in the Capelo Forest Park, island of Faial

The archipelago is a region of volcanic landscapes with a strong terrestrial and marine biodiversity, marked by its place relative to continental Portugal, exhibiting a group of peculiar characteristics of great interest to conservationists. Various factors contribute to this interest: its insularity, climate and geology, which ferment ecological conditions that are distinct to Portugal.

The area, which has been populated since the 15th century, has several ecosystems and habitats with an elevated diversity of flora and fauna species. Of the endemic species characteristic of the islands: 68 are vascular plants, nine bryophytes, 49 gastropods, 267 insect species, spiders, centipedes, crustaceans and arachnids, in addition to one mammal and two endemic bird species. Bird species in the Azores, primarily migratory species, are usually found along the coastal islets and volcanic rocks, constituting important habitats. There are 46 bird species in the Azores, 33 that use the archipelago as a rookery, nesting periodically throughout the year. The other species are found within the forests in the interior, including some Laurasilva forests. Marine biodiversity is encapsulated within an area that includes the islands' tidal zones until the abyssal plain, registering 460 species of fish, across 142 families. In addition, five of the seven species of the known oceanic turtles migrate within the waters of the archipelago, including the Loggerhead sea turtle (Caretta caretta, considered an important marker for species habitat preservation.

In each of the nine islands there are rare and diverse ecosystems, marked by volcanic calderas, lava fields, caves, pit caves, fumaroles, reefs, water courses and geological fissures. Each of these biotopes area characterized by the presence of multiple species and habitats, including various which are subject to the Natura 2000 convention on habitats (such as Council-Directive 92/43/CEE 21 May 1992, regarding the preservation of natural habitats for wildlife and plants). Similarly, the protection of migratory and wild species of birds is framed within the European bird convention.

Given the diverse habitats and ecosystems that exist in the Azores, and following the expansion of the Natura 2000 into Azores, the Regional Government sought to implement an environmental model which was based on management criteria with uniform set of designations, in order to classify protected areas. Using the island as the territorial management unit the Government of the Azores proceeded to overhaul the legal system that governed protected areas in order to classify, manage and administer protected areas in the region. This was accomplished by Regional Legislative Decree 15/2007/A, 25 June 2007, subsequently amended by the rectification 79/2007, 21 August 2007.

In this context, and taking into account the obligations under the European Union, the OSPAR, the Ramsar and the implementation of nature conservation policies at the national level, resulted in the creation of a network of Protected Areas of the Azores, which has the following objectives:

- To identity and value of each terrestrial or marine protected area;
- To establish mechanisms for conservation, preservation and management of ecosystems, supporting biodiversity, natural resource and scientific use;
- To contribute to the development of a network of natural conservation, that encompasses the protection and safeguarding of natural resources and values;
- To create manageable units for protected areas of each islands and surrounding sea.

In order to achieve these general objectives, the Protected Areas of the Azores pursued the following management goals:

- To promote and manage resources and natural and cultural values;
- To enhance the natural, cultural and built environments, regulating and intervening in order to mitigate its degradation;
- To promote awareness, monitoring, conservation and dissemination of environmental values thereon;
- To foster culture-based environmental information, interpretation and participation of organizations and citizens;
- To promote tourism activities and leisure incompatibilities in order to reconcile economic development of protected areas.

== Protected areas ==
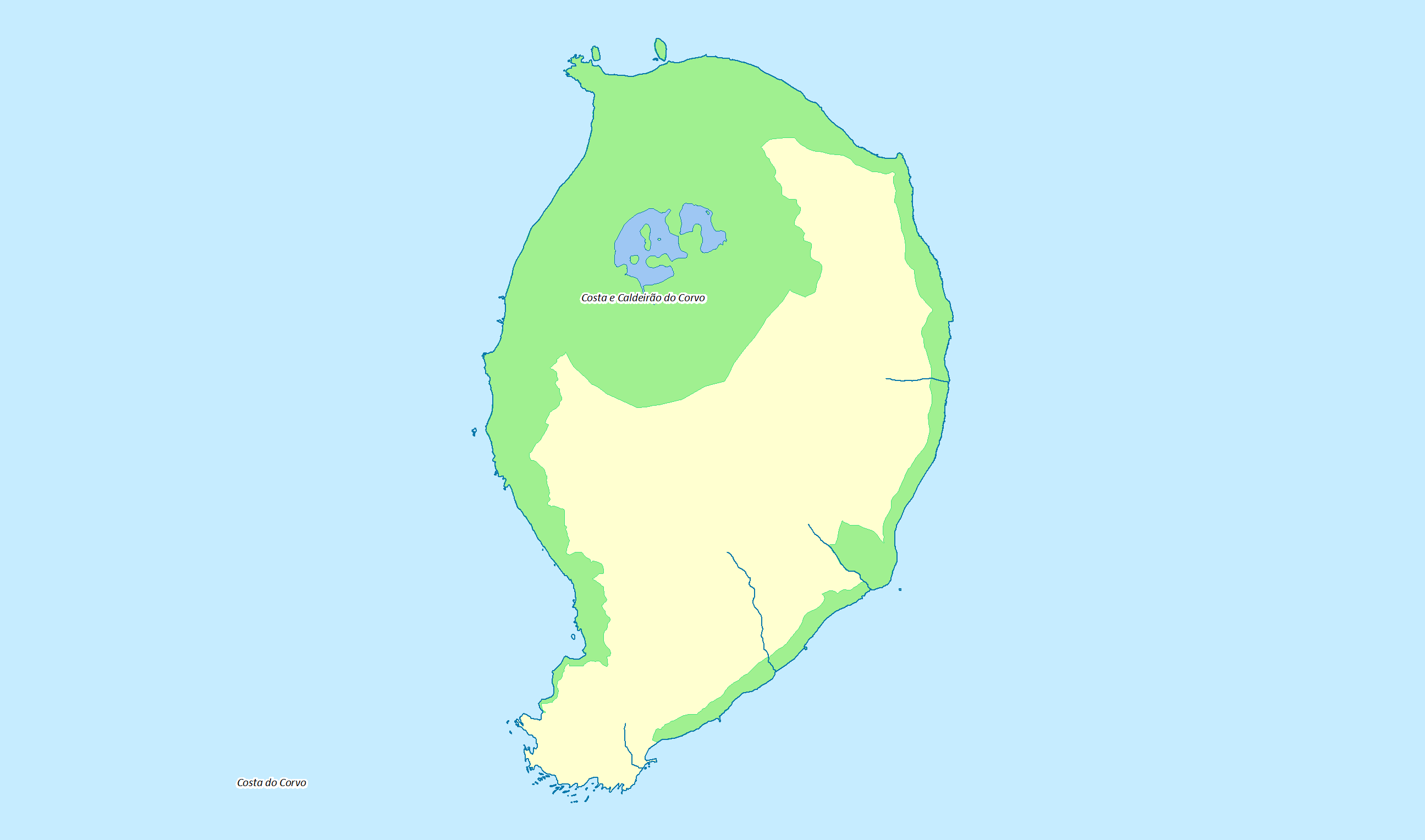
Nature Park of Corvo

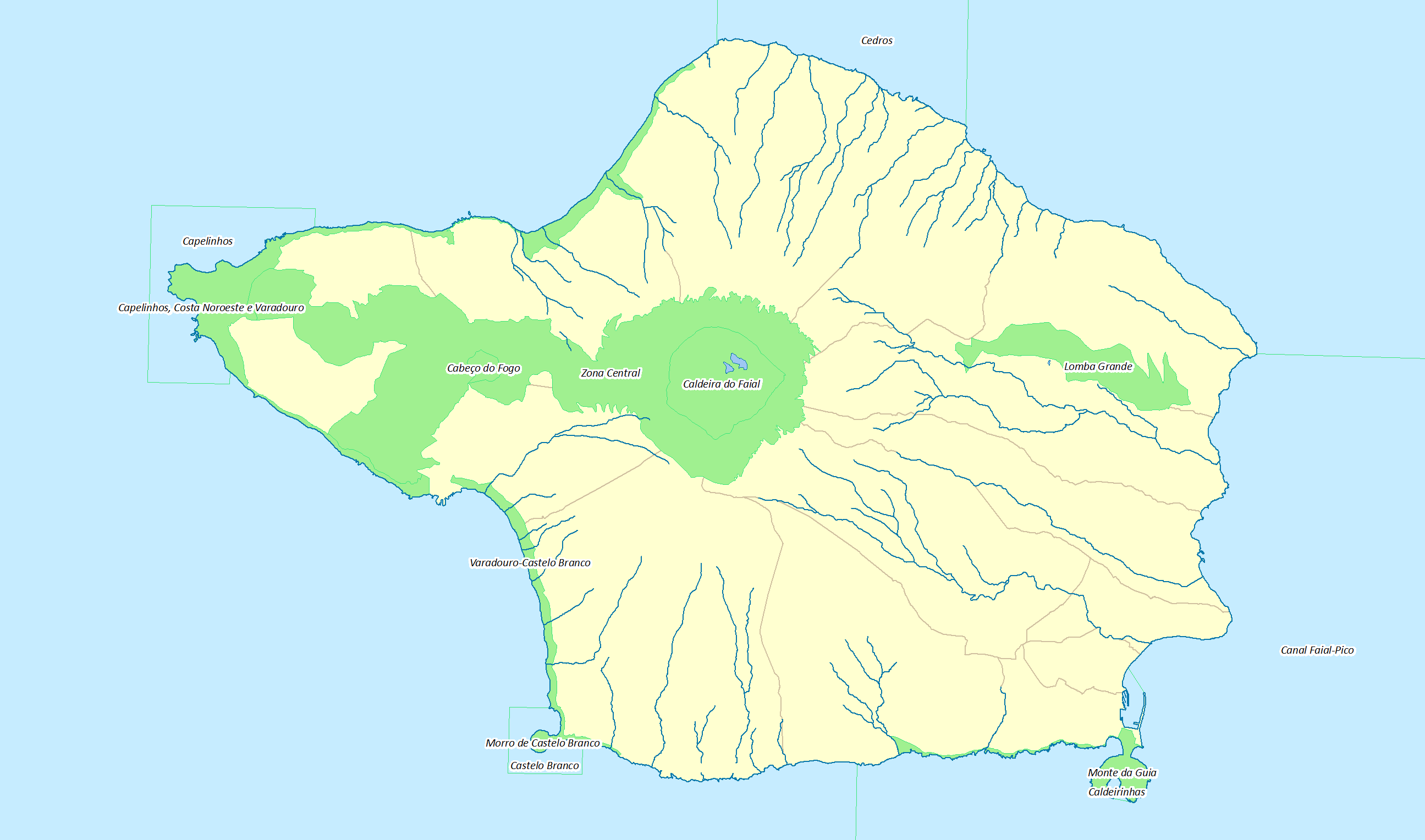
Nature Park of Faial

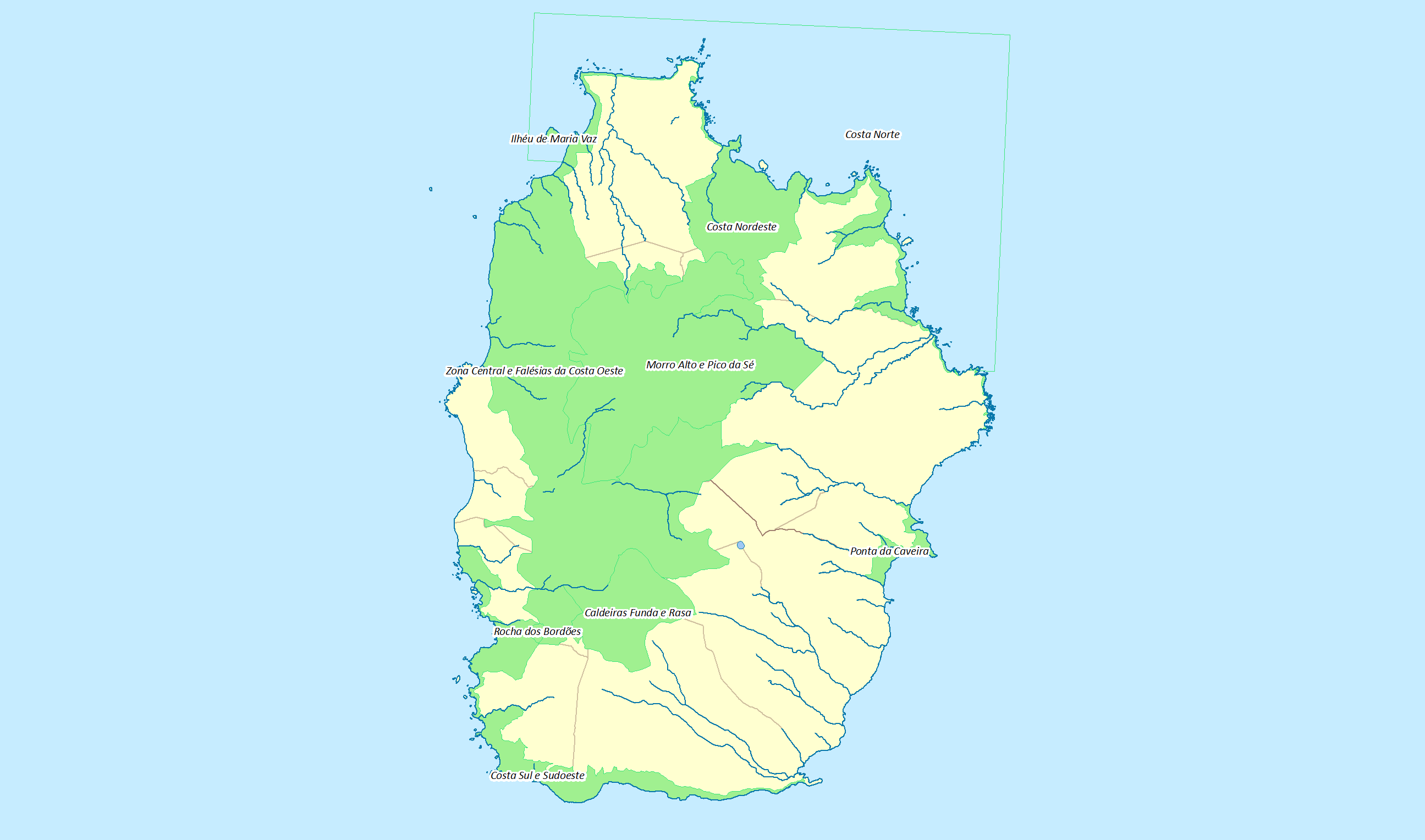
Nature Park of Flores

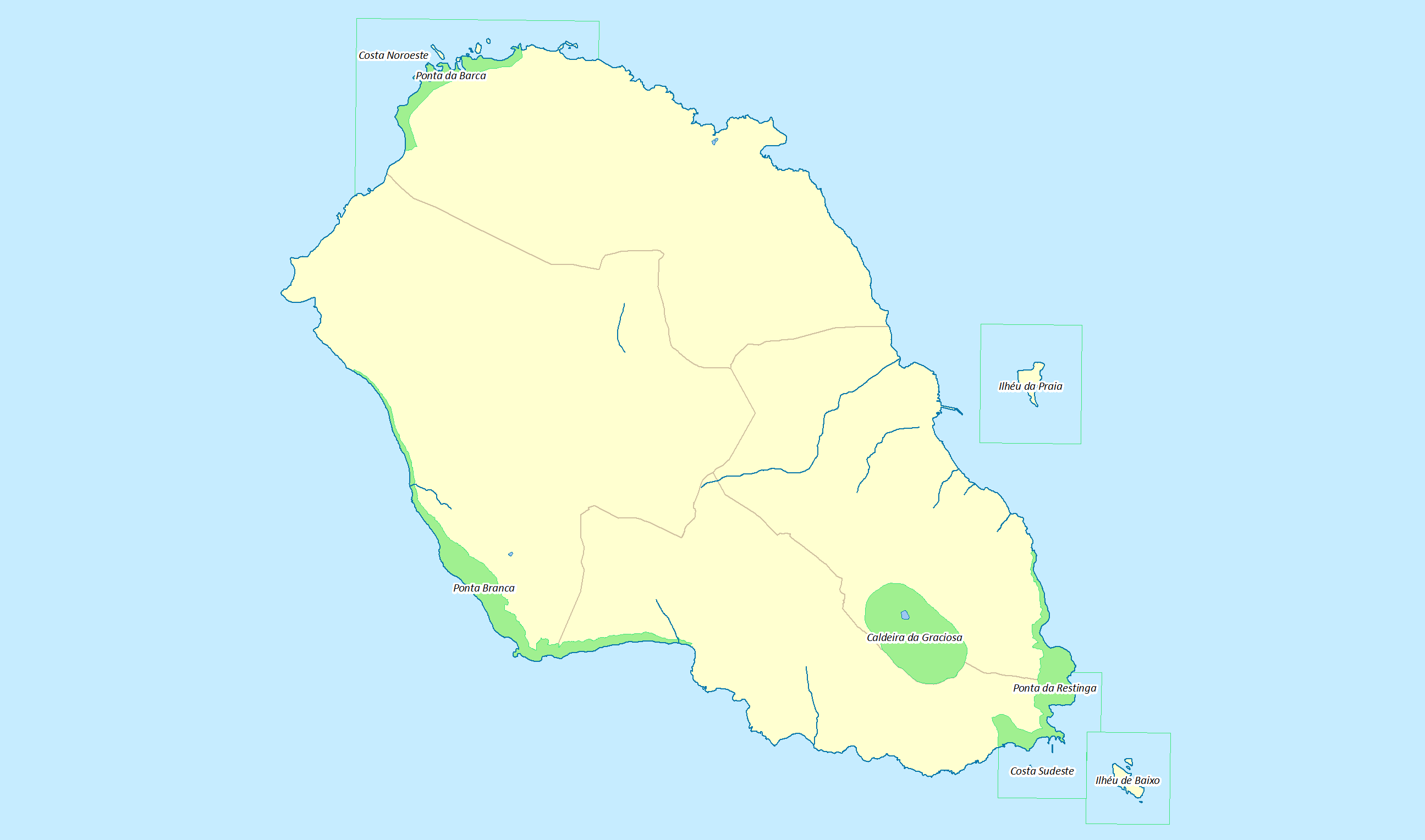
Nature Park of Graciosa

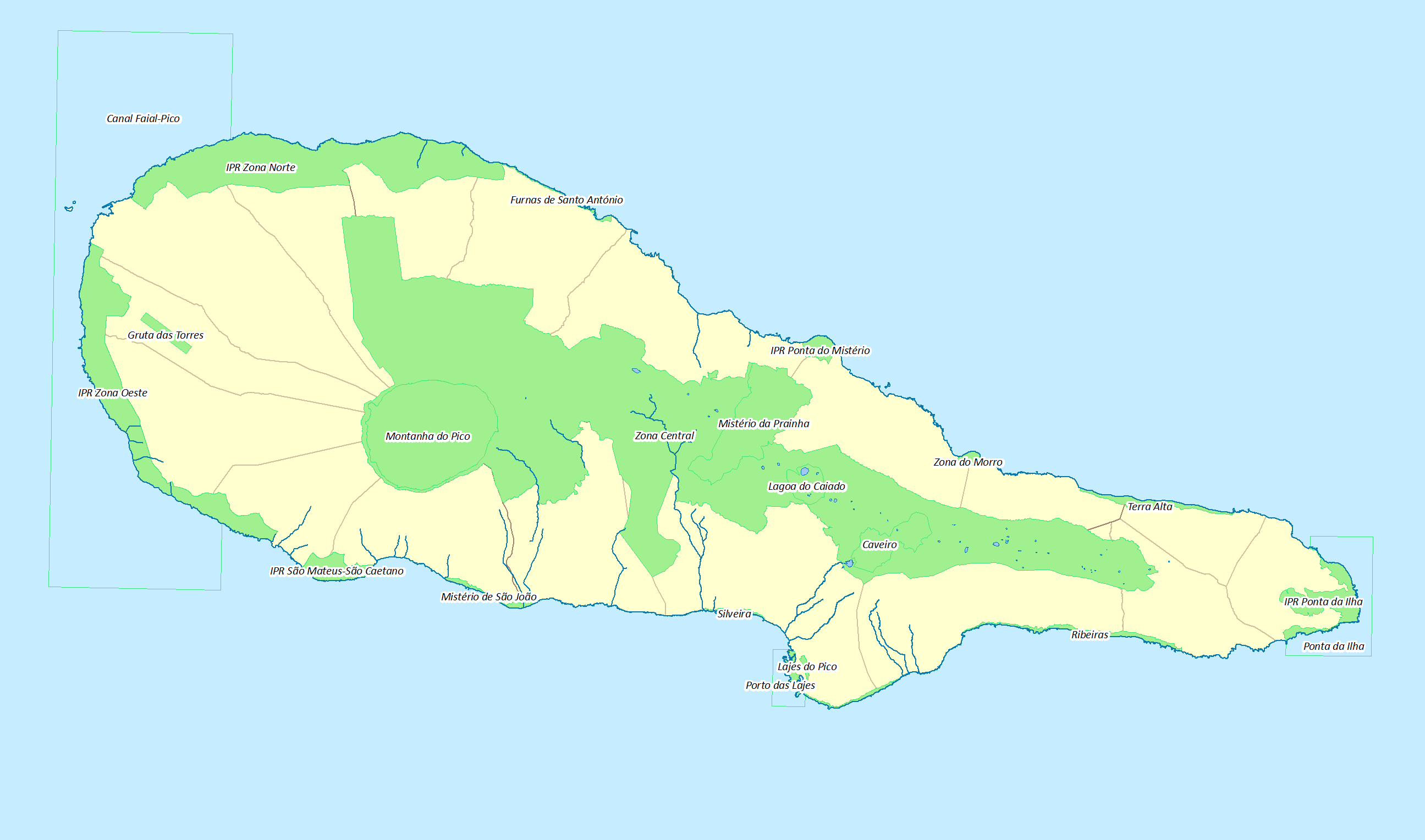
Nature Park of Pico

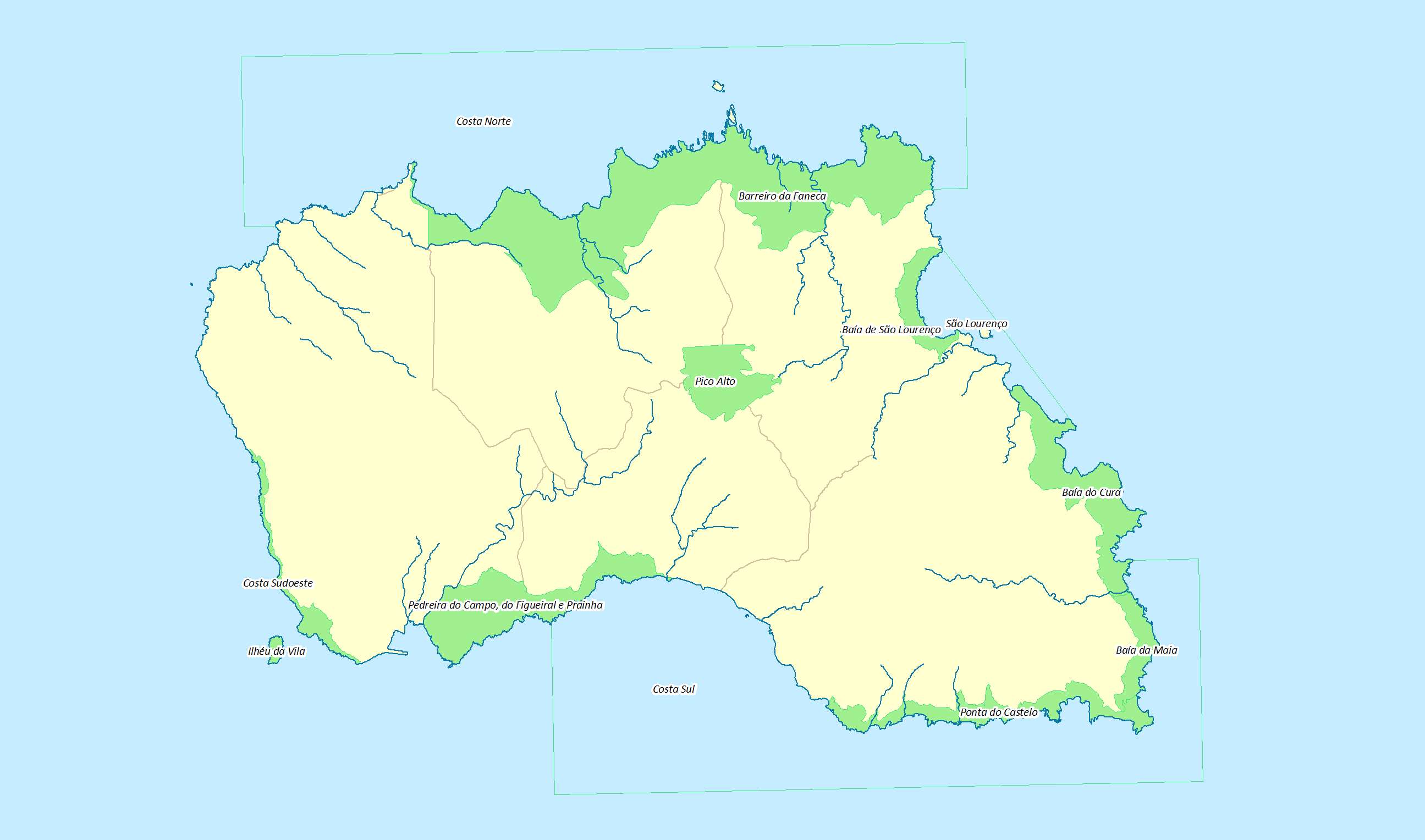
Nature Park of Santa Maria

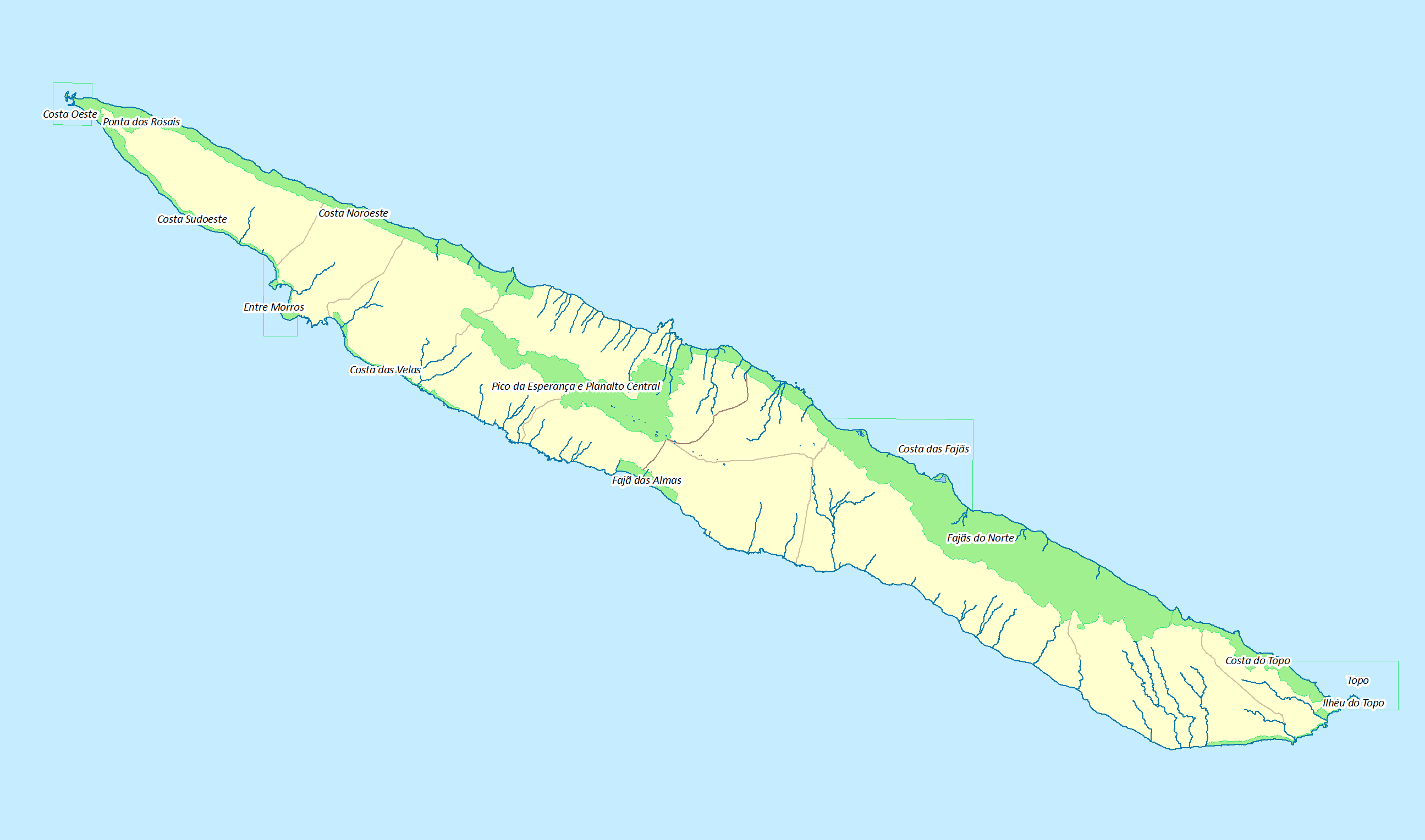
Nature Park of São Jorge

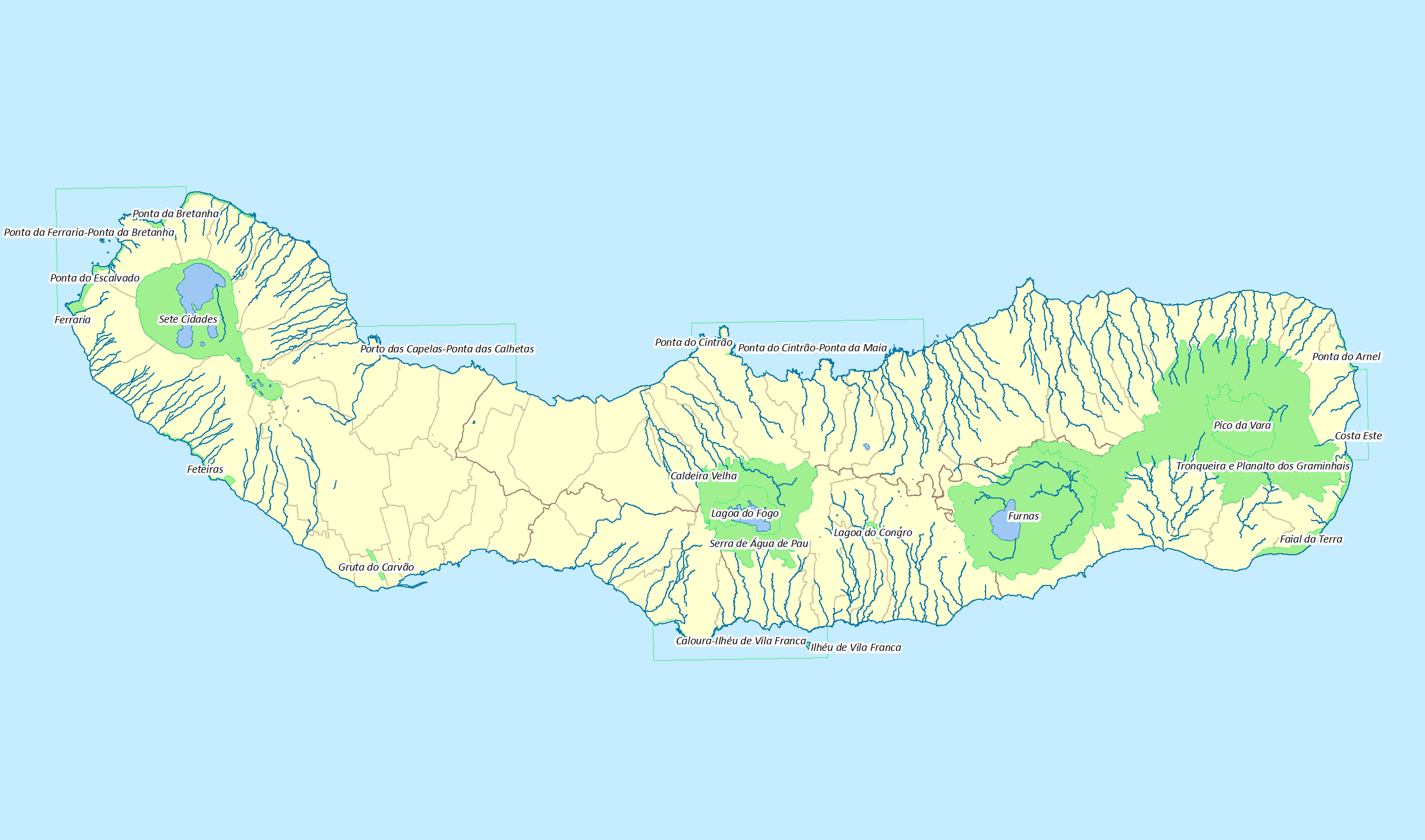
Nature Park of São Miguel

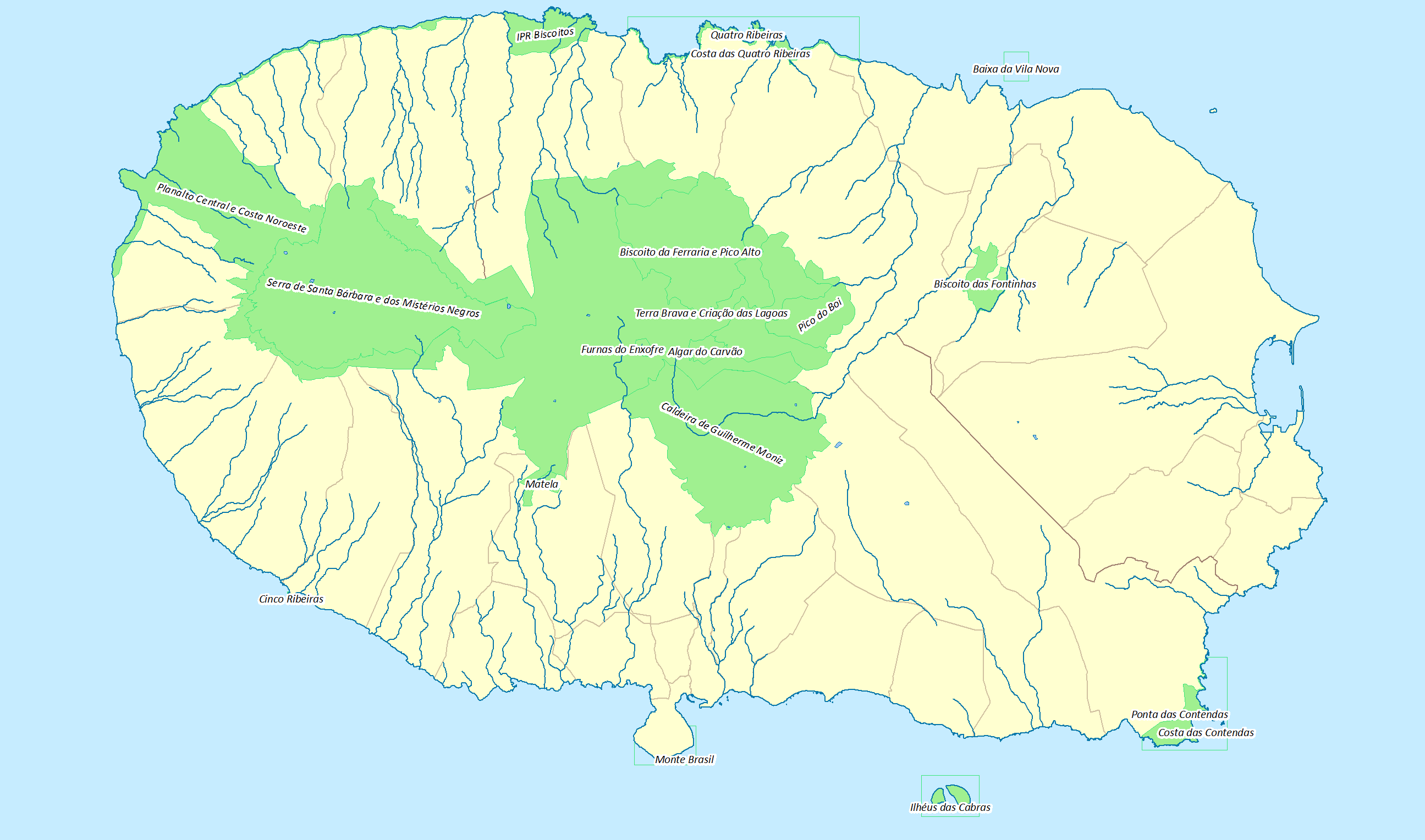
Nature Park of Terceira

The Azores consists of a network of protected areas constituted by legally delimited geographic territories, regulated and managed under specific guidelines established to advance territorial integrity and management of biodiversity. Each protected area is defined by a classification system developed by the IUCN, that sets-out specific categories for the management of protected areas. In course are revisions to the nature protection protocols.

This network of protected areas includes all the zones that may fall into pre-declared management areas, such as:

- Protected areas destined for the preservation of natural habitats, wild flora or fauna, included in the Natura 2000 network, that include:
  - Sites of communitarian importance;
  - Special zones of conversation;
  - Special protection zones;
- Protected humid zones of international importance, used in the preservation of aquatic bird habitats, under the Ramsar Convention, specifically:
  - Ramsar sites;
- Protected areas created as shelter, under terms of Annex V of the OSPAR Convention. Annex 5 includes amendments to the Convention on the Northeast Atlantic Marine Environment (OSPAR Convention), adapted in Sintra, on 23 July 1998, approved by Portugal under decrete 7/2006, 9 January:
  - OSPAR Marine Protection Areas
- Areas of regional and local importance for the conservation of nature, biodiversity and landscapes:
  - Important Bird Areas;
  - Protected Areas of Regional Importance;
  - Recreational Forest Reserves;
  - Important Local Protection Areas.

=== Management units ===
In order to administrate and manage the protected areas of the Azores, the Secretária Regional do Ambiente e do Mar (Regional Secretariat of the Environment and Sea) established the following management units:

- Island Nature Parks (Portuguese: Parque natural de ilha), the PNIs are basically island management units, that encompass all the protected domains within each individual island;
- Marine Parks of the Azores (Portuguese: Parque Marinho dos Açores), the PMAs which, outside the oceanic limits of the Azores, integrates a specific management designation to areas that may fall within or without the Economic Exclusion Zone of the Azores/Portugal; and
- Local protected areas (Portuguese: Áreas protegidas de importância local), created by local authorities to safeguard natural spaces, and include local parks, gardens, lookouts or comparable structures/spaces, that also include the Reservas Florestais de Recreio (Recreational Forest Reserves);

Owing to existing designations, the Island Nature Parks and Marine Park of the Azores, include some areas already classified under the international conventions and directives.

These management areas correspond to distinct resource-rich and ecological significant physical zones that could ensure a continuity of ecological processes, while protecting inland and coastal areas. The regional network of protected areas, therefore, adopted the International Union for Conservation of Nature (Portuguese: União Internacional para a Conservação da Natureza) categorization scheme in order to classify these natural regions due to their particular geographic, environmental, cultural and politico-administrative function in the territory, based on the following categories:

- Category 1 - Nature Reserves (Portuguese: Reserva natural)
- Category 3 - Natural Monuments (Portuguese: Monumento natural)
- Category 4 - Protected Areas for the Management of Habitats or Species (Portuguese: Área protegida para a gestão de habitats ou espécies)
- Category 5 - Protected Landscape Areas (Portuguese: Área de paisagem protegida)
- Category 6 - Protected Areas for the Management of Resources (Portuguese: Área protegida de gestão de recursos)

The Island Nature Parks, therefore, consist of various IUCN-designated areas within the administrative framework of each island. They include:

- Nature Park of Corvo (Portuguese: Parque Natural do Corvo)
- Nature Park of Faial (Portuguese: Parque Natural do Faial)
- Nature Park of Flores (Portuguese: Parque Natural das Flores)
- Nature Park of Graciosa (Portuguese: Parque Natural da Graciosa)
- Nature Park of Pico (Portuguese: Parque Natural do Pico)
- Nature Park of São Jorge (Portuguese: Parque Natural de São Jorge)
- Nature Park of São Miguel (Portuguese: Parque Natural de São Miguel)
- Nature Park of Santa Maria (Portuguese: Parque Natural de Santa Maria)
- Nature Park of Terceira (Portuguese: Parque Natural de Terceira)

In addition to the,

- Marine Archaeological Park of the Azores (Portuguese: Parque Marinho do Arquipélago dos Açores)

== Natura 2000 ==
The implementation of the Natura 2000 directives had its base in a group of areas identified between 1986 and 1987, under the CORINE Project, that included important biotopes of a primordial character. A list of CORINE biotopes was produced that served as a base to propose the listing of several sites of communitarian importance, which was adopted under resolution 30/98, 5 February 1998, later corrected under Declaration 12/98, 7 May 1998, and approving a Lista Nacional de Sítios/Açores (List of National Sites for the Azores).

This list was later recognized by the European Union, and integrated into the Sítios de Importância Comunitária (SIC) (Sites of Communitarian Importance) and published with Commission decision 2002/11/CE 28 December 2001, and adopted as part of the bio-geographic definition of Macaronesia and Azorean territory, under Directive 92/43/CEE. This decision was later altered by Commission Decision 2008/95/CE 25 January 2008 and substituted by Commission Decision 2009/1001/UE (22 December 2009), which adopted in the application of the Directive 92/43/CEE, a secondary list with updated definitions.

Another component of the Natura 2000 project implemented in the Azores, the Special Protection Zones (Portuguese: Zona de Protecção Especial, ZPE), includes the conservation of wild birds, was declared by the European Commission in 1990, and included within the Azorean legislation under Regional Regulatory Decree 14/2004/A, 20 May 2004. (later altered in 24/2004/A, 1 July 2004 and 9/2005/A, 19 April). It corresponds to a group of classified areas under Directive 79/409/CEE, 2 April 1979, and legislated into action by Regional Regulatory Decree 18/2002/A, 16 May 2002.

Article 4 of the Habitats Directive, requires that six years following the declaration of an area as a zone of communitarian importance, a status member must designate the areas as a special conservation zone. The article establishes priorities for its maintenance and the reestablishment of favourable conservation practices, in order to propagate natural habitats. This requisite was accomplished under Regional Regulatory Decree 5/2009/A, 3 June, which classified sites of communitarian importance (SIC) as special conservation zones (ZEC), in the territory of the Azores.

Initially, 23 sites of communitarian interest were identified, covering an area of approximately 33,639 ha. In addition, 15 special protection zones, associated with wild bird species, covering 11,825 ha and 8,646 ha of marine habitats were also included. Some terrestrial and marine areas of the Azores, characterized by their high richness in terms of biological diversity, were designated as SIC and SPAS.

A Commission Decision 2009/1001/UE, on 22 December 2009, implemented Directive 92/43/CEE, that provided an updated list of important sites of communitarian interest to include the Menez Gwen and Lucky Strike hydrothermal vents to the list of protected spaces.

== See also ==
- Protected areas of Portugal
