= Cabras =

Cabras may refer to the following places:

- Cabras, Sardinia, a town in Italy
- Cabras Island, on Guam
- Pino Cabras (born 1968), Italian politician
- Ilha das Cabras, an island in the municipality of Ilhabela, São Paulo, Brazil
- Ilhéu das Cabras, an island of São Tomé and Príncipe
- Cabras Islets, Island in the Azores, Portugal
