= Nature Park of Flores =

Protected area of the island of Flores

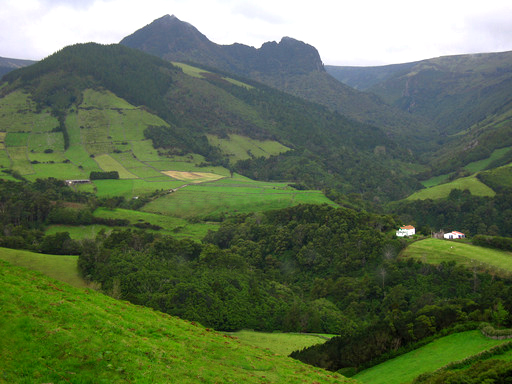
- Interior landscape of the island of Flores

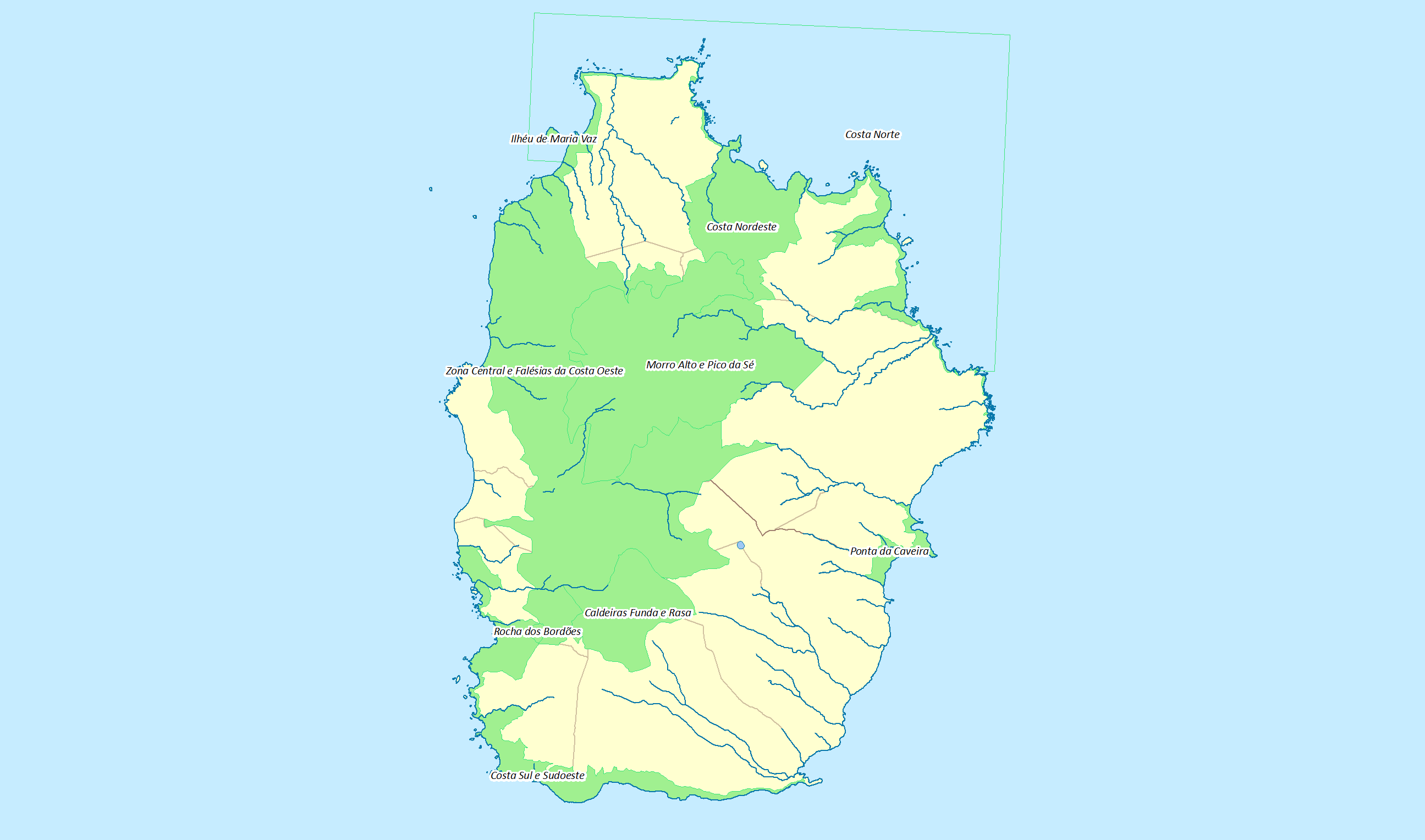
- The location of the various protected areas that constitute the Flores Nature Park
- Location: Flores, Central, Azores, Portugal
- Established: Decreto Legislativo Regional n.º 46/2008/A
- Named for: Flores
- Operator: Secretário Regional do Ambiente e do Mar
- Website: www.parquesnaturais.azores.gov.pt

The Nature Park of Flores (Portuguese: Parque Natural das Flores), or simply Flores Nature Park (PNF), developed from the intention of better managing the protected areas of the island of Flores, and was instituted by the Secretaria Regional do Ambiente e do Mar (Regional Secretariate for the Environment and Oceans), of the Autonomous Regional Government of the Azores. Although there are several ecosystems and environmentally distinct, this nature reserve includes three principal areas (the calderas Funda and Rasa, the mountain region of Morro Alto and Pico da Sé and the islet of Maria Vaz), in addition to several protected areas.

== History ==
The creation of this Nature Park was made in order to aggregate various protected areas, with various diverse protection statutes covering bio- and geo-diversity. The protected areas included are classified as nature reserves, natural monuments, protected areas for habitat preservation, areas for landscape protection and areas protected for natural resource management.

The Nature Park was created by regional legislative decree on 23 March 2011 (law 8/2011/A).

The island of Flores became part of the network of World Biosphere Reserves (UNESCO), along with the islands of Corvo and Graciosa, on 27 May 2009. The area that is included in the biosphere definition includes most of the island, in addition to the marine ecosystems around them: in total the region includes 58,619 hectares, selected for the landscapes, geological, environmental and cultural characteristics that make it unique. Part of its designation comes from its importance as nesting areas for migratory and marine bird species. The higher altitudes and humid areas of the Central Plateau is known for Atlantic peat bog and forest of Juniperus brevifolia, vital for the island's hydrology and for supporting the ravines and waterfalls that define the landscape.

== Geography ==
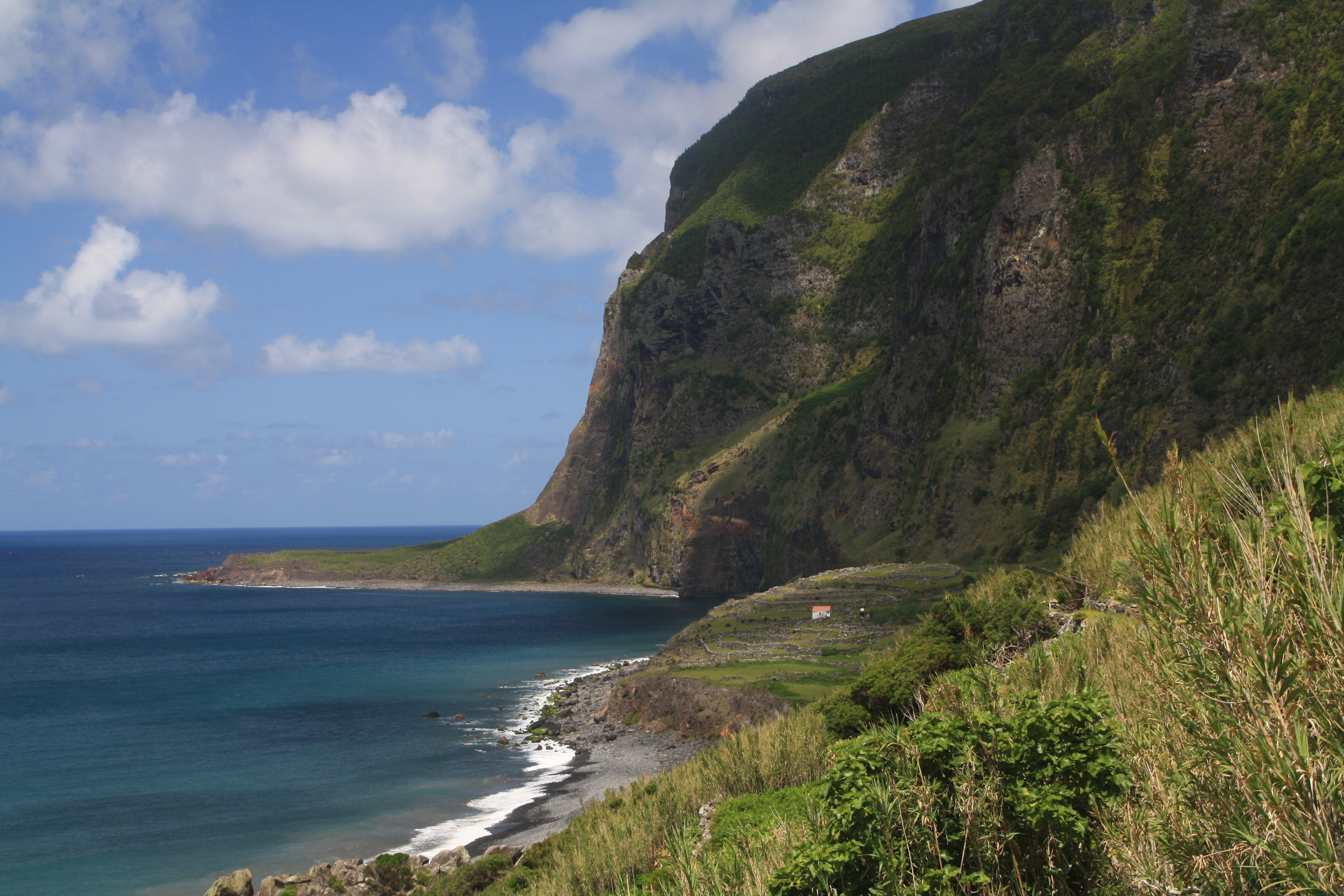
A view of the debris field of Fajã de Lopo Vaz

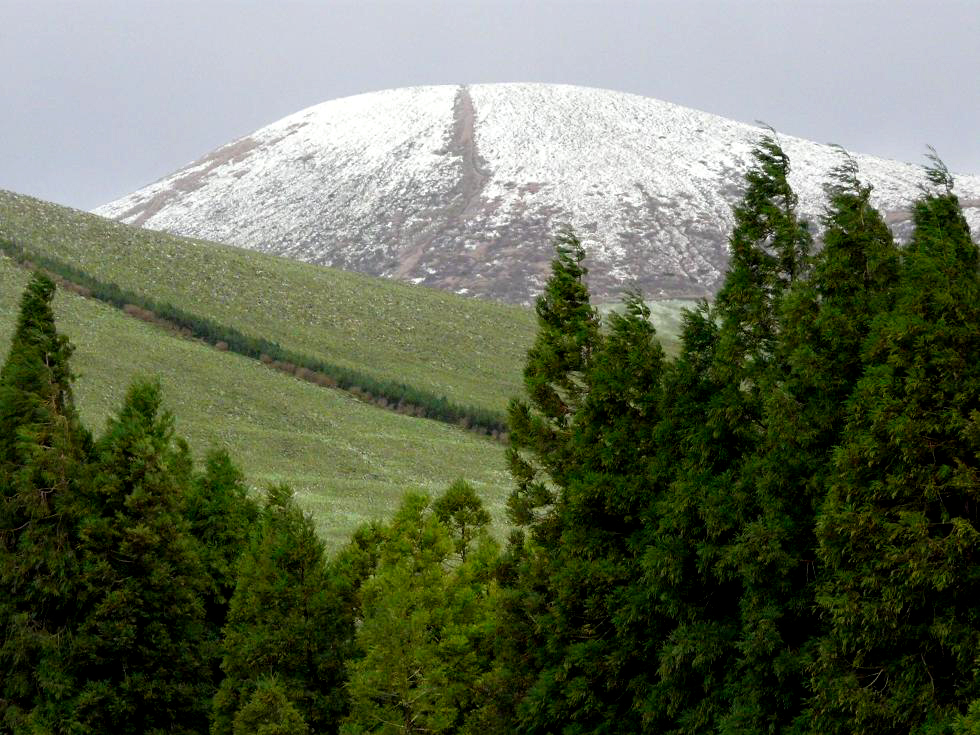
The snow-covered interior hilltops of Pico de Sé

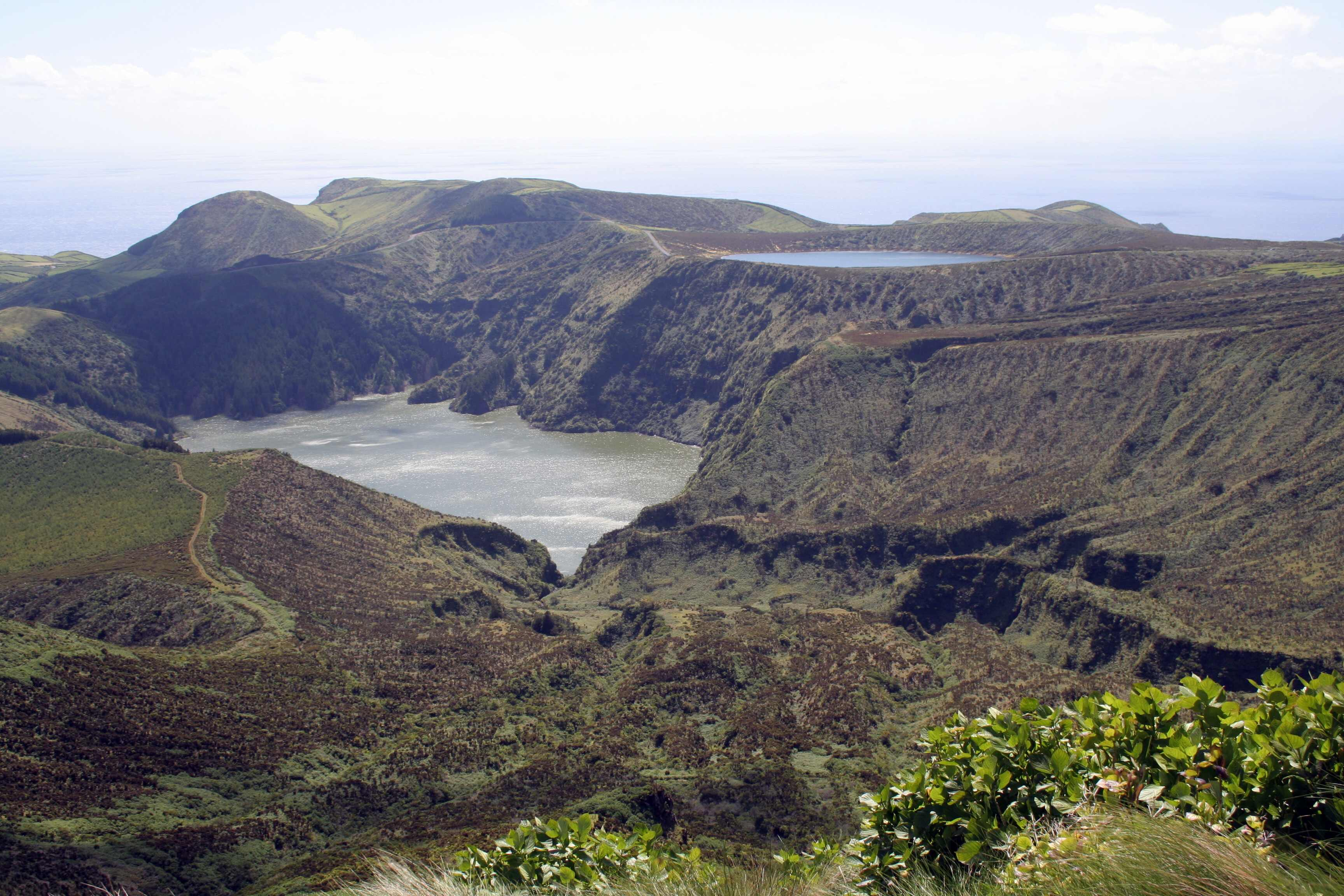
The twin lakes of Lagoa Cumprido and Lagoa Rasa

The Flores Nature Park is actually a dispersed reserve that encompasses several individual areas of protection. The nature reserve encourages the use of the spaces and promotes biodiversity, through nature tourism and the creation of local products. Meanwhile, the regional government provides incentives for promoting scientific investigation, projects to promote international cooperation and sustainable development.

=== Classified areas ===
==== Nature reserves ====
Those areas classified as Nature Reserves (Portuguese: Reserva Natural) include:

- [FLO01] Nature Reserve of the islet of Maria Vaz (Portuguese: Reserva Natural do Ilhéu de Maria Vaz)
- [FLO02] Nature Reserve of Morro Alto and Pico da Sé (Portuguese: Reserva Natural do Morro Alto e Pico da Sé)
- [FLO03] Nature Reserve of Caldeiras Funda and Rasa (Portuguese: Reserva Natural das Caldeiras Funda e Rasa), defined by a line that extends from Pico da Marcela to the 708 metres (2,323 ft) altitude and extends to the southeast, curving at a peak 769 metres (2,523 ft) that separates the water bodies of Caldeira Funda and Ribeira Funda. Then the limits advance to the south along a line delimited by the watershed hydrography of Caldeira Funda, connecting the lake area forest road, before following the tract north to the old Caminho Velho to Rochão da Ventosa, continuing the southern area of the Ribeira do Mosteiro until the confluence before extending north, until the top of Pico da Marcela and returning.

==== Natural monuments ====
- [FLO04] Natural Monument of Rocha dos Bordões (Portuguese: Monumento Natural da Rocha dos Bordões), the natural monument intersects the Estrada Regional E.R.1–2 and Ribeira do Fundão, extending to the south for 700 metres (2,300 ft), curving near Ribeira da Lapa, before extending north to the top of the Rocha dos Bordões. From this point the border extends to the west, until the 470 metres (1,540 ft) altitude before intersecting the Ribeira do Fundão back to the E.R.1–2.

==== Protected areas ====
Areas classified for Protection and Management of Habitats or Species (Portuguese: Área Protegida para a Gestão de Habitats ou Espécies):

- [FLO05] Protected Area of the Northwest Coast (Portuguese: Área Protegida da Costa Nordeste)
- [FLO06] Protected Area of Ponta Caveira (Portuguese: Área Protegida da Ponta da Caveira)
- [FLO07] Protected Area of the South and Southwest Coast (Portuguese: Área Protegida da Costa Sul e Sudoeste)

==== Protected landscapes ====
Areas classified as Protected Landscapes (Portuguese: Paisagem Protegida):

- [FLO08] Protected Landscape of the Central Zone and Western Bluffs (Portuguese: Área Protegida da Zona Central e Falésias da Costa Oeste)

==== Resource areas ====
Areas classified for Management of Resources (Portuguese: Gestão de Recursos):

- [FLO09] Protected Resource Management Area of the North Coast (Portuguese: Área Protegida da Costa Norte)

=== Trails ===
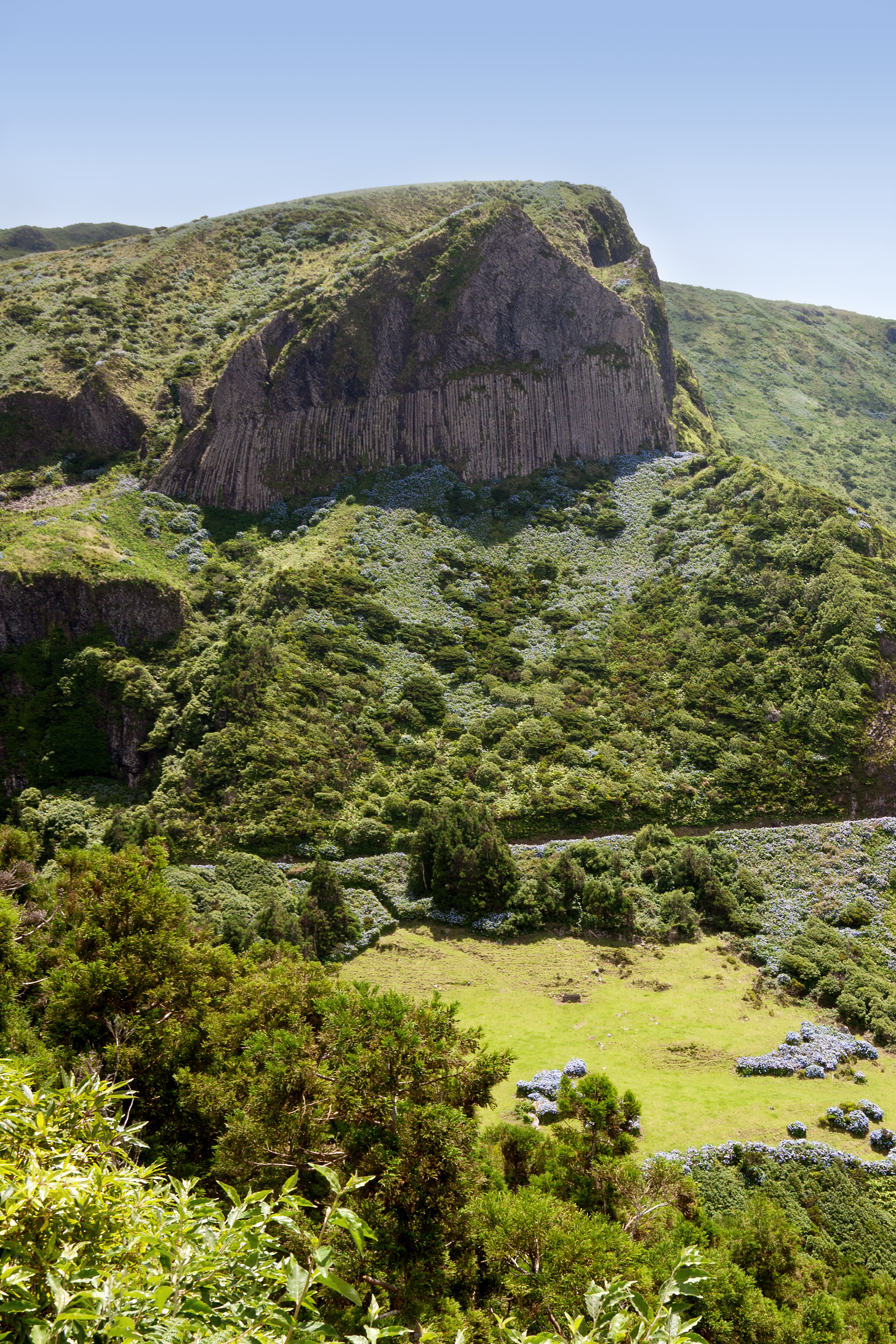
The natural monument of Rocha dos Bordões

From each of the trails, there are different points of interest that can be discovered, including varying landscapes and buildings on the journey, highlighted by common species of flora and fauna. Geological formations and various buildings mark the history of the Azores, since many of these trails were the original paths between settled areas, allowing contact between people and the exchange of agricultural products and fish, among others. The official hiking trails are:

- PR1FLO Ponta Delgada – Fajã Grande
- PR2FLO Lajedo – Fajã Grande
- PR3FLO Poço do Bacalhau
- PR4FLO Fajã Lopo Vaz

== Interpretative Center ==
Situated in the centre of Santa Cruz das Flores, in the area of Boqueiro. and created in the oil tanks used to store whale oil, produced in the whaling factory. It is an area dedicated to the promotion and learning about the local environment, and specifically, marine ecosystem. At the site it is possible to view information on migratory and local bird species, but also includes a review of the whales and marine species that abound in the hydrothermal vents off the shelf. The site includes washrooms, lounges and shops, but also access to tour guides, an auditorium for films and permanent expositions.

== See also ==
- Protected areas of the Azores
