= Cabras Islets =

Island in the Azores, Portugal

Native name: Ilhéus das Cabras
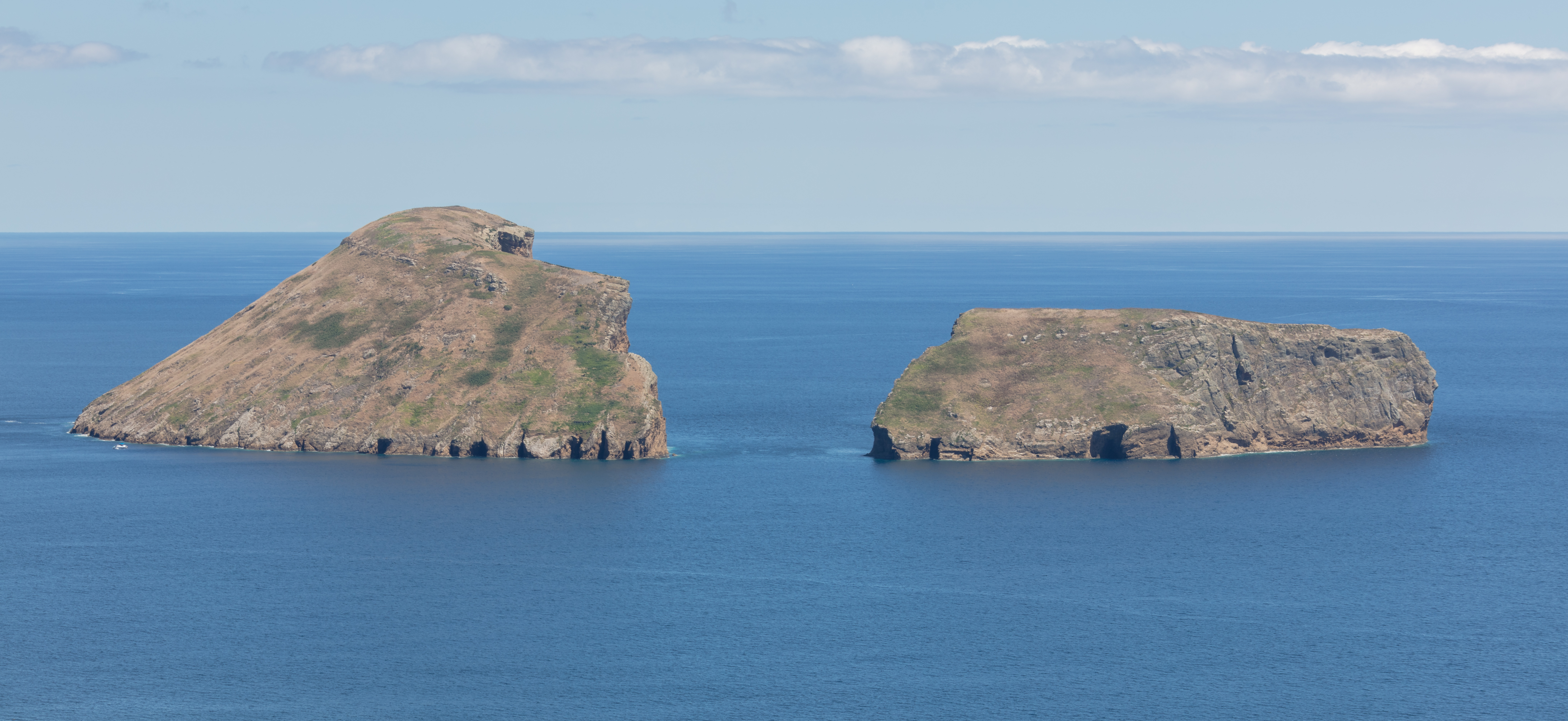
- View from Terceira Island.

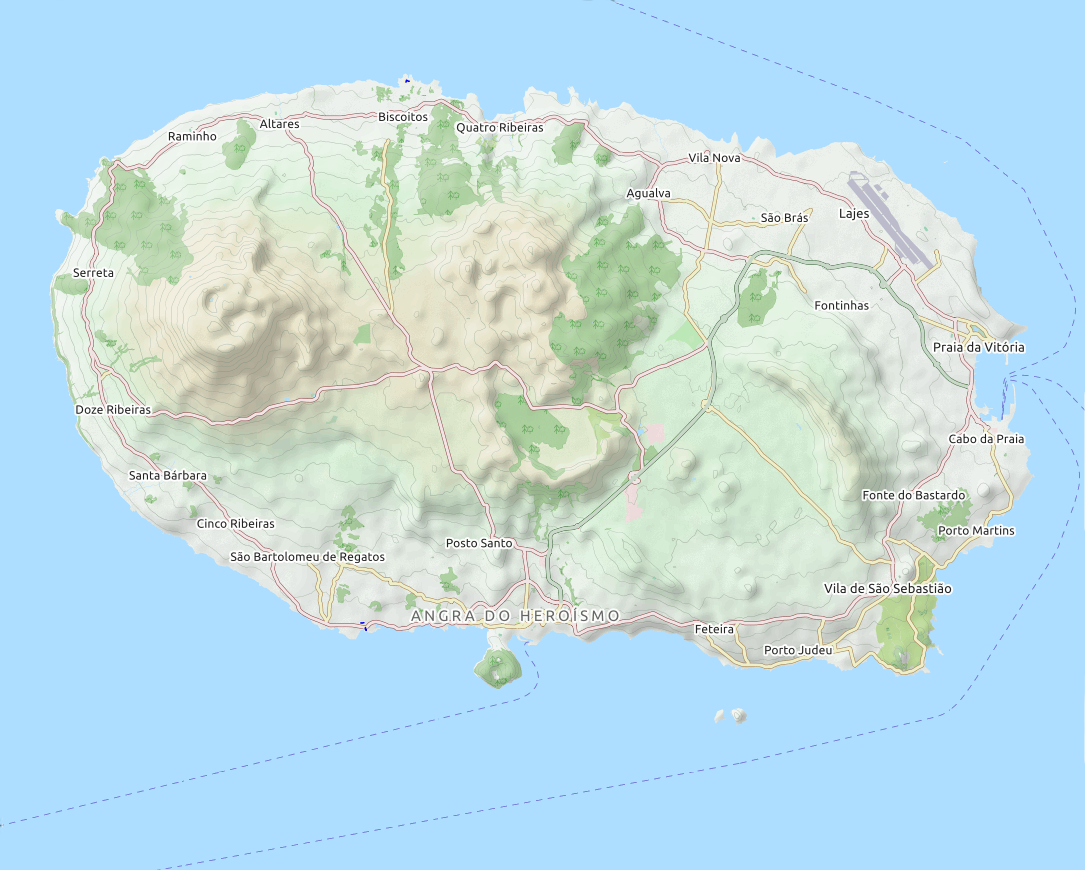
- Location of the islets off the coast of Terceira
- Etymology: "cabras" is Portuguese for "goats"

Geography
- Location: Atlantic Ocean
- Coordinates: 38°37′49.03″N 27°8′36.33″W
- Area: 0.2814 km^{2} (0.1086 sq mi)

Administration
- Portugal
- Autonomous region: Azores

Demographics
- Population: uninhabited; historically, shepherds

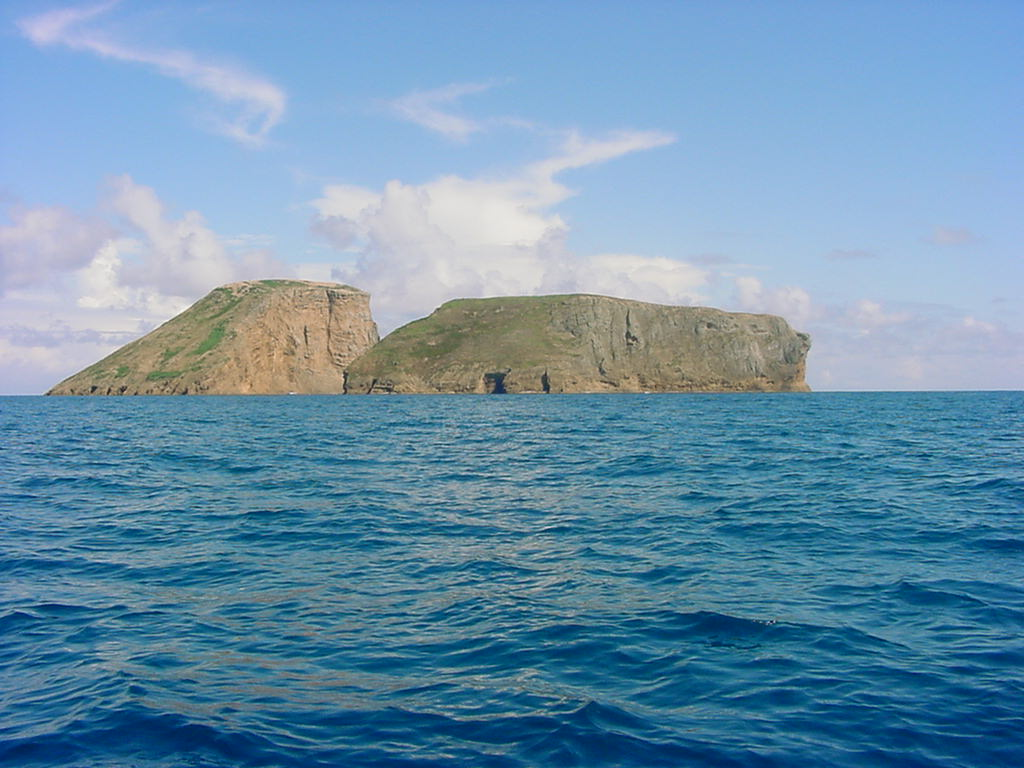
The profile of the cone that formed the islets, comprising the Ilhéu Grande (Large Islet), on the left, and the Ilhéu Pequeno (Small Islet), to the right.

The Cabras Islets or Cabras Islet (Portuguese: Ilhéus das Cabras; literally, Islets of the Goats) is an uninhabited dual islet located along the southern coast of the island of Terceira in the Portuguese archipelago of the Azores. The group, with a total area of 29 hectares (72 acres) and perimeter of 3,239 metres (10,627 ft), is the largest islet in the Azores. Locals normally refer to it as a single islet (Portuguese: O Ilhéu das Cabras), but it comprises two landforms: the Ilhéu Pequeno (Small Islet) and the Ilhéu Grande (Large Islet).

== History ==
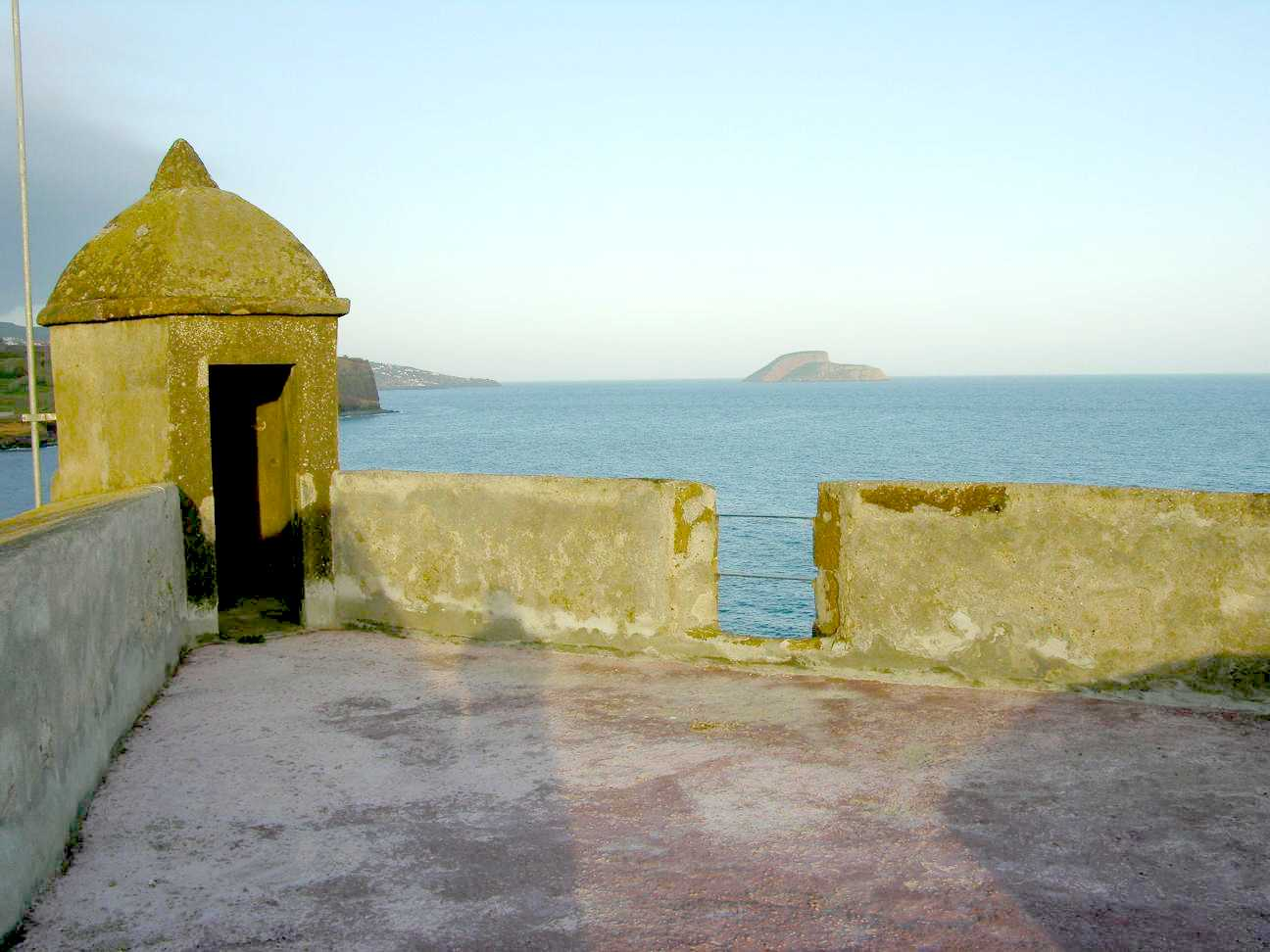
A view of the Cabras Islets from the Fort of São Sebastião

Although uninhabited today, the islets were historically used by shepherds, who foraged their goats and sheep on the islets throughout the year during early settlement of the archipelago. This practice gave the islets their name. Legend also recounts that for seven years a young Faialense man with a capricious heart was exiled to the islet by the father of his beloved maiden.

From the earliest settlement of the archipelago, the islets were embroiled in controversy associated with their ownership. In 1666, the islets were part of the property of Braz Pires do Canto, son of Sebastião Martins do Canto. Two centuries later, on 26 February 1872, the islets were registered in the name of Miguel do Canto e Castro Pacheco de Sampaio, a descendant of Braz Pires. Miguel do Canto was a Peer of the Realm and lived in Lisbon, and relied on his aunt Margarida Cândida do Canto, a resident of Angra do Heroísmo, to represent his claim. The registry office considered the claim justified, since the islets were continuously owned by the Canto family. Ownership later transferred to José Francisco do Canto's grandfather, Miguel do Canto e Castro Pacheco de Sampaio.

On 11 February 1905, the islets changed ownership, becoming the property of physician Dr. Eduardo Abreu and his wife Adelaide de Brito do Rio Abreu, residents of the city of Amares. The Abreus inherited the island from D. Maria Luísa do Canto e Castro da Silva Ataíde, who willed it to them (approved 3 November 1888). The Abreus' son Henrique Abreu, then a resident of Braga, transferred the lands into his name on 26 September 1910.

Today, the islets remain the private property of the descendants of José Luís Evangelho.

In the southern part of the island of Terceira, some people claim a German U-boat hid in the waters around the islet during World War II, conducting its attacks from the area.

Azorean writer Vitorino Nemésio, a native of Terceira, referred to the islets as "a estátua da nossa solidão" ("the statue of our solitude") in his 1956 book Corsário das Ilhas (English: Corsair of the Islands).

In 2011 the Ilhéus das Cabras ZPE (Portuguese: Zona de Proteção Especial, or Special Protection Zone in English) was formally integrated into the Nature Park of Terceira. This zone encompasses the islets and the waters around them:

- [TER07] Área Protegida dos Ilhéus das Cabras (English: Cabras Islets Protected Area), including all land above sea level, encompassing the cliffs and landforms
- [TER17] Área Marinha Protegida dos Ilhéus das Cabras (English: Cabras Islets Protected Marine Area)

The goal of this re-classification is protecting marine wildlife, specifically marine birds that nest in the cliffs and rocky outcrops of the landforms.

== Geography ==
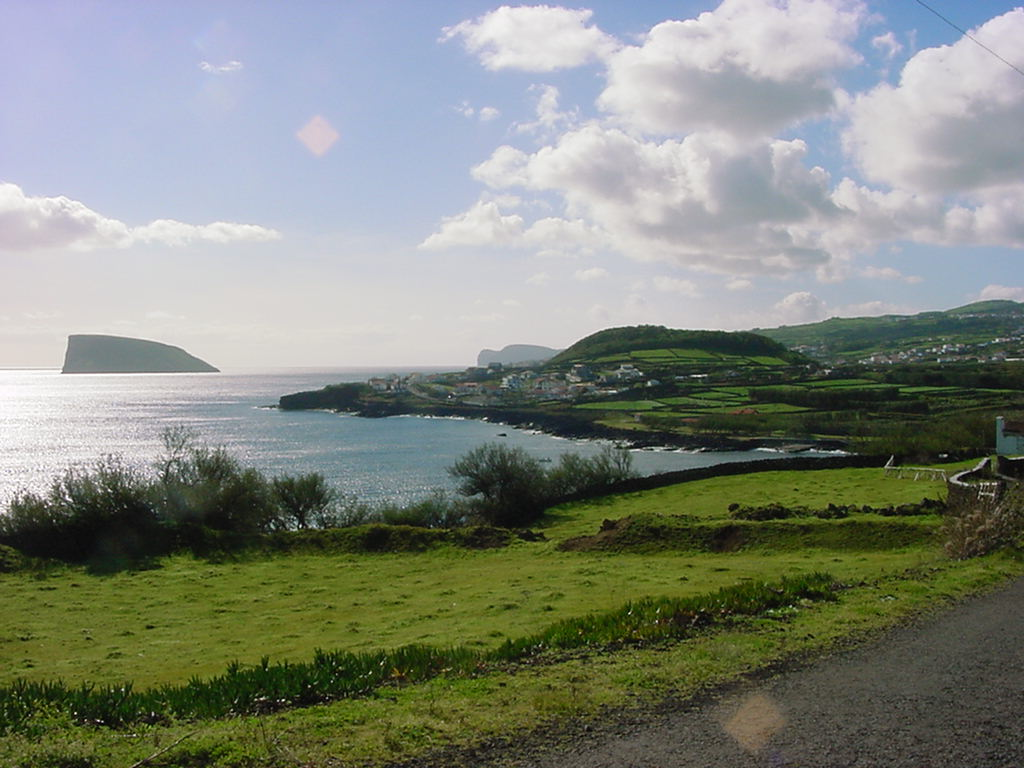
The eastern face of the Cabras Islets, as seen from the Ponta de Contendas, on the island of Terceira

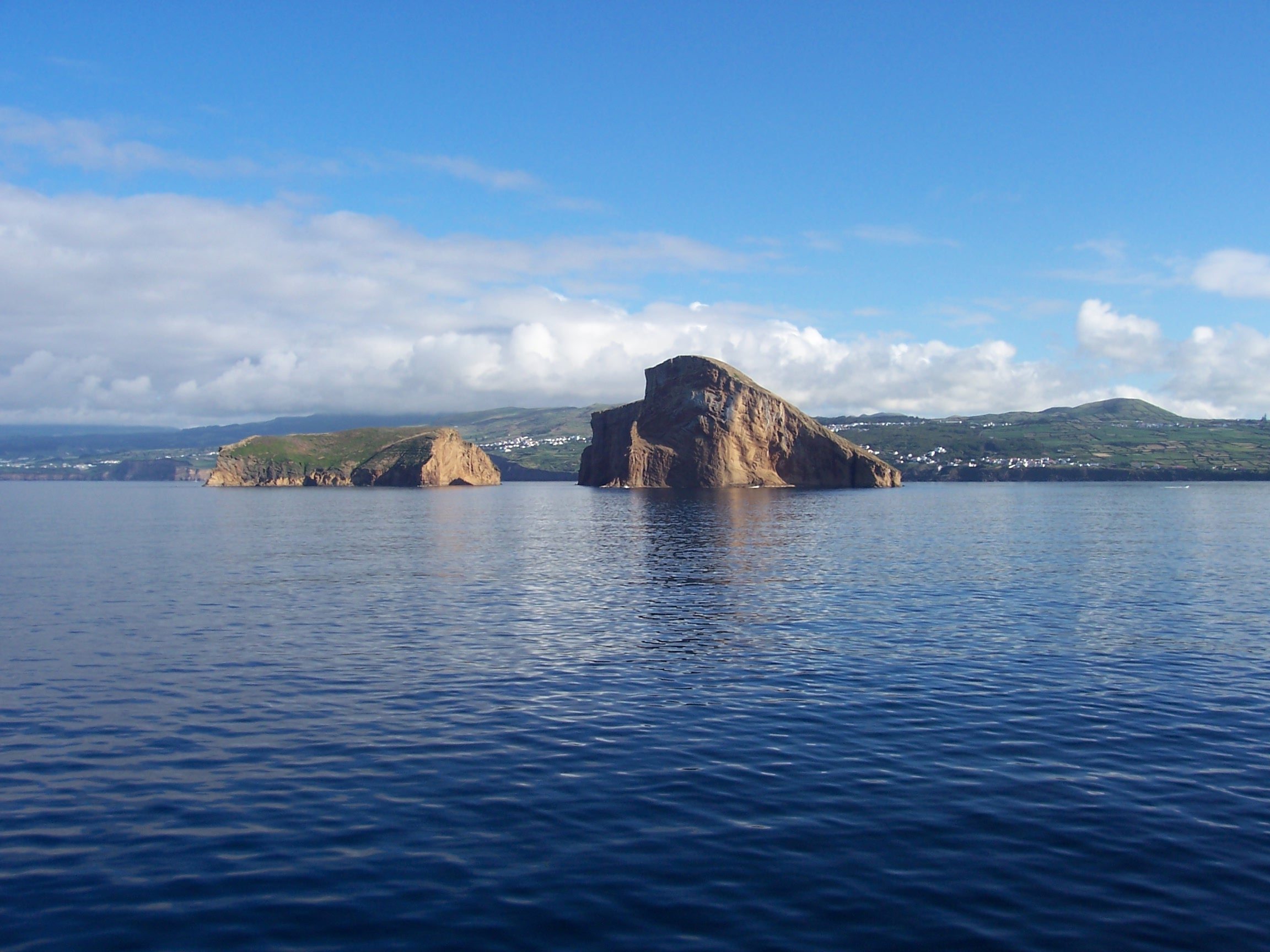
A view of the Cabras Islet, as seen from the southeast corner, with the island of Terceira in the background

The islets are located on the southeast coast of Terceira, east of Angra do Heroísmo, and politically part of the civil parish of Porto Judeu. They are volcanic islets, the remains of a cinder cone eroded by the sea and fortified by tectonic palagonite forces.

The remains of the symmetrical cone of the submarine volcano which originated the islets inspired Vitorino Nemésio to characterize the islets as "broken in half, as if badly formed".

=== Biome ===
Difficult human access and rocky cliffs makes this area an ideal location for a significant population of Cory's shearwater (Calonectris borealis) and common tern (Sterna hirundo), which annually migrate through the Azores to nest, in addition to grey heron (Ardea cinerea), sanderling (Calidris alba), Kentish plover (Charadrius alexandrinus), and other marine birds such as seagulls (family Laridae). The presence of these birds, protected by Annex I of the Habitats Directive, resulted in the islets' reclassification as a Special Protection Zone, warranting its inclusion within the listing of Important Bird Areas (Portuguese: Zonas Importantes para as Aves) in the Azores (published by BirdLife International).

The Azorean bat (Azores noctule), which also inhabits the islets, is an endemic mammal of the Azores and the smallest European bat species. This species is threatened and therefore protected by the Bern Convention and Habitats Directive, as evaluated by the International Union for Conservation of Nature.

The islets have various grottoes, caves, and niches formed by volcanic activity resulting in diverse and unique biotopes. The Ratões Grotto (Portuguese: Gruta dos Ratões, or Grotto of the Rats in English) along the northern coast of western islet is recognized by divers as one of the few places in the Azores possibly supportive of a large reproductive mass of common eagle rays (Myliobatis aquila).

The biodiversity and geographical conditions make the area around the Cabras ideal for sub-aquatic activities, including recreational diving and scientific investigations. The area is home to various fish species, as well as other marine vertebrates and invertebrates. The common bottlenose dolphin (Tursiops truncatus) and turtles, including the loggerhead sea turtle (Caretta caretta), also frequent the area (species also covered under Annex II of the Habitats Directive within the European Union).
