= Pico Nature Park =

- Parque Natural do Pico
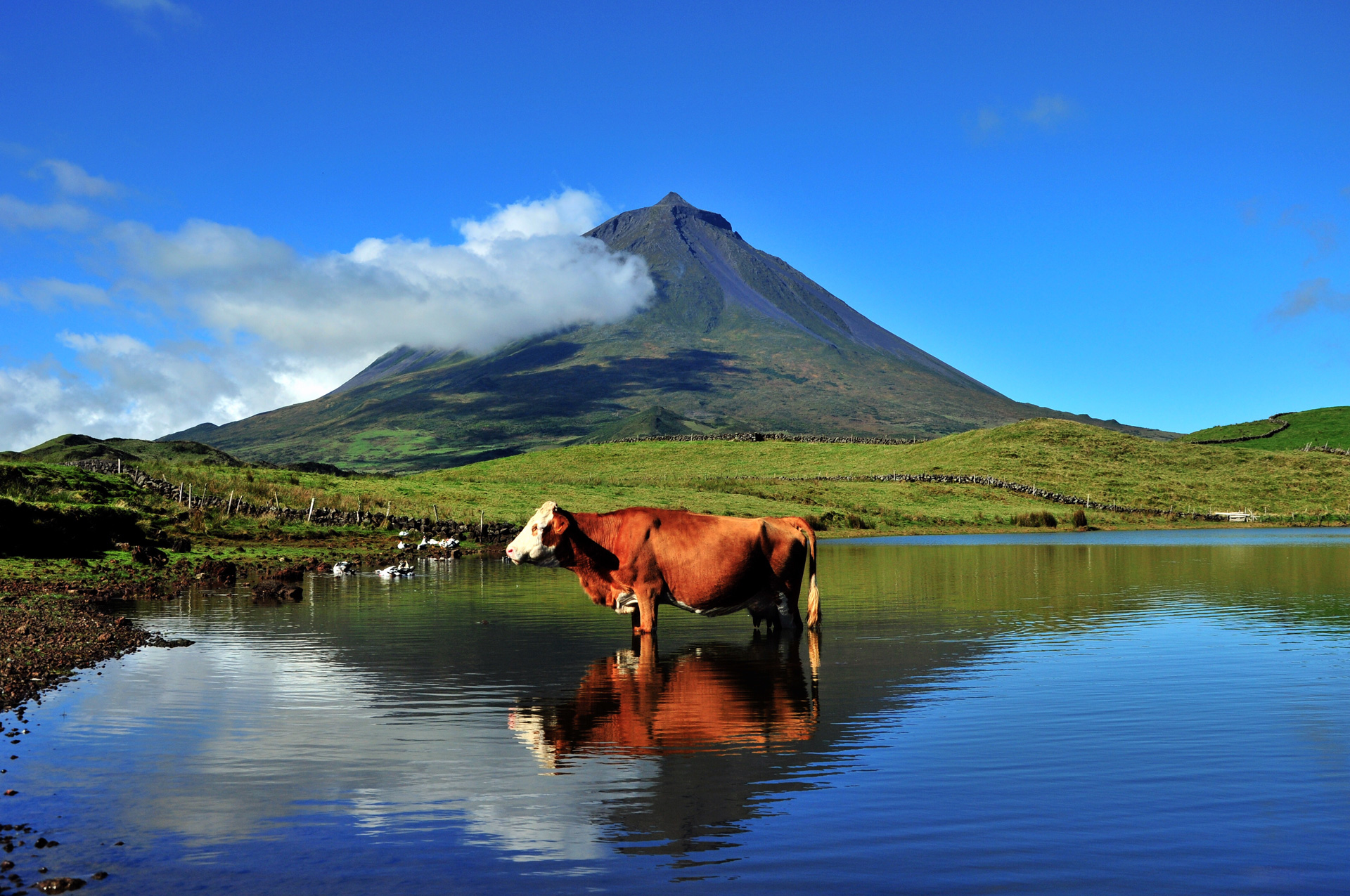
- Lagoa do Capitão and Mount Pico

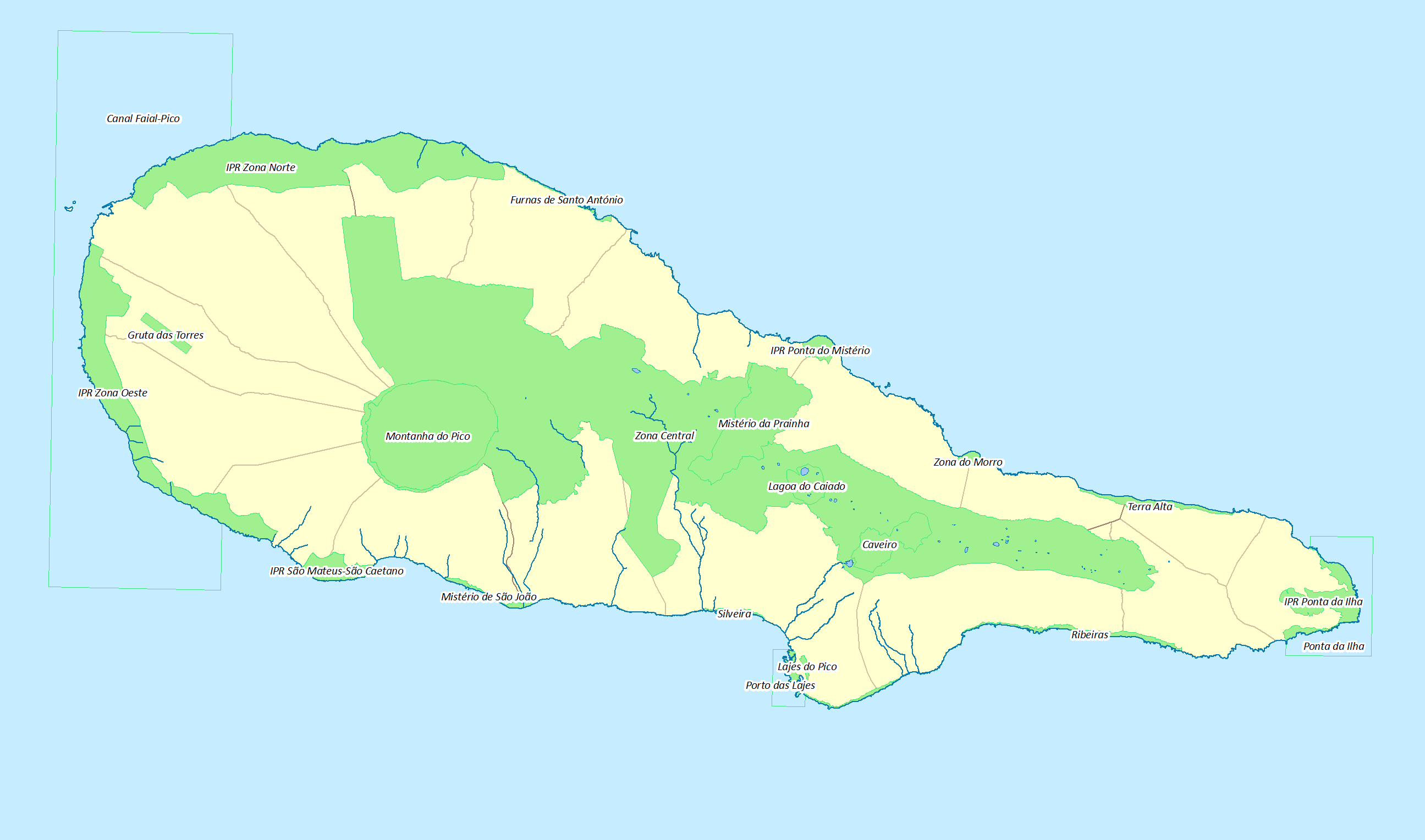
- Location of the various protected areas that englobe the nature park
- Coordinates: 38°27′53″N 28°18′50″W
- Area: 231.48 km^{2} (89.37 sq mi)
- Created: 2008

Pico Nature Park is a Portuguese nature park located on the island of Pico, on the Azores. Created in 2008, it is the largest nature park of the archipelago, occupying 35% of the island (equivalent to 157.1 km^{2} (60.7 sq mi)) plus 74.38 km^{2} (28.72 sq mi) of marine domain.
