= Praia Islet =

Islet in the Azores, Portugal

Native name: Ilhéu da Praia
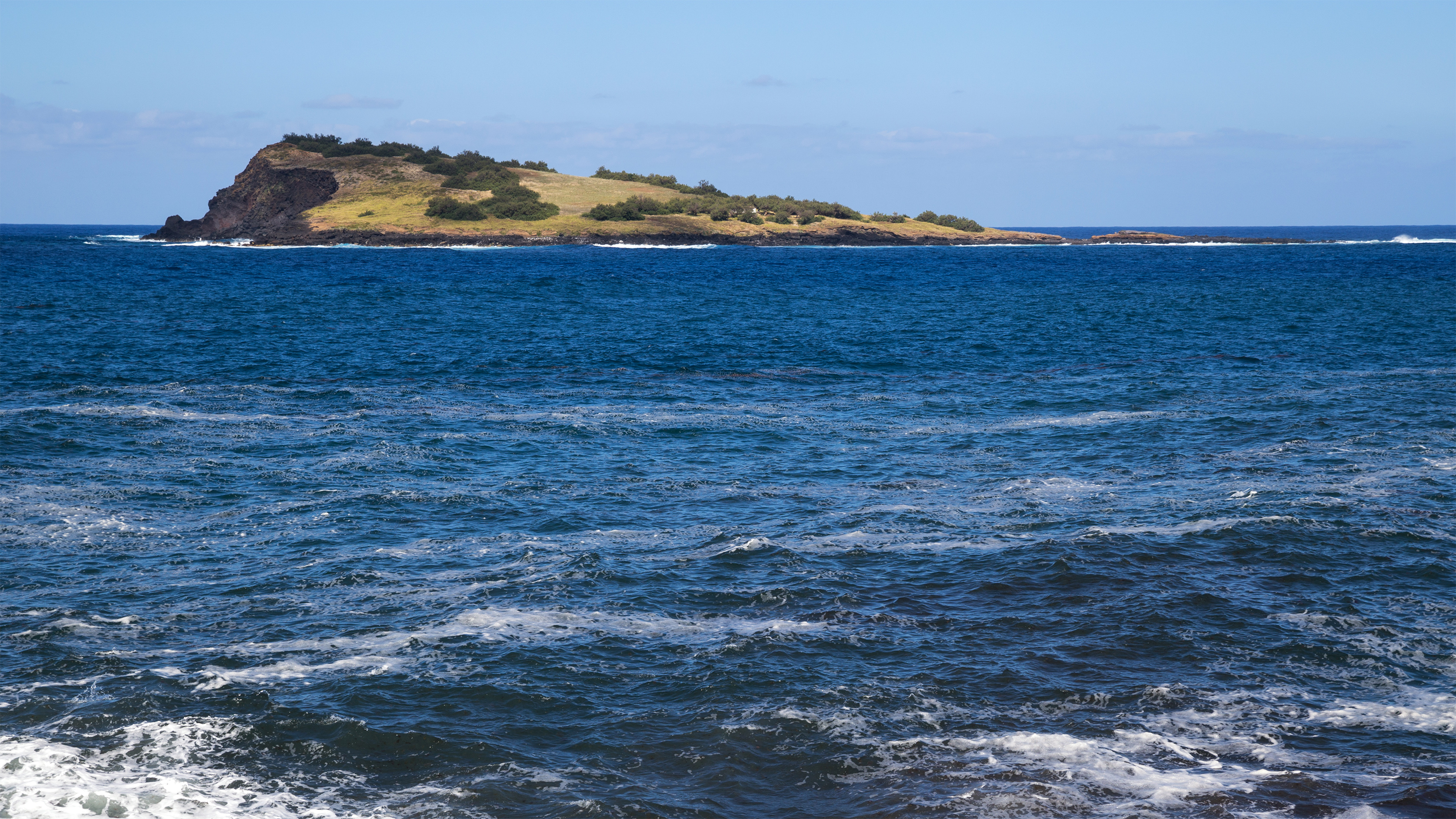
- The islet seen from Graciosa

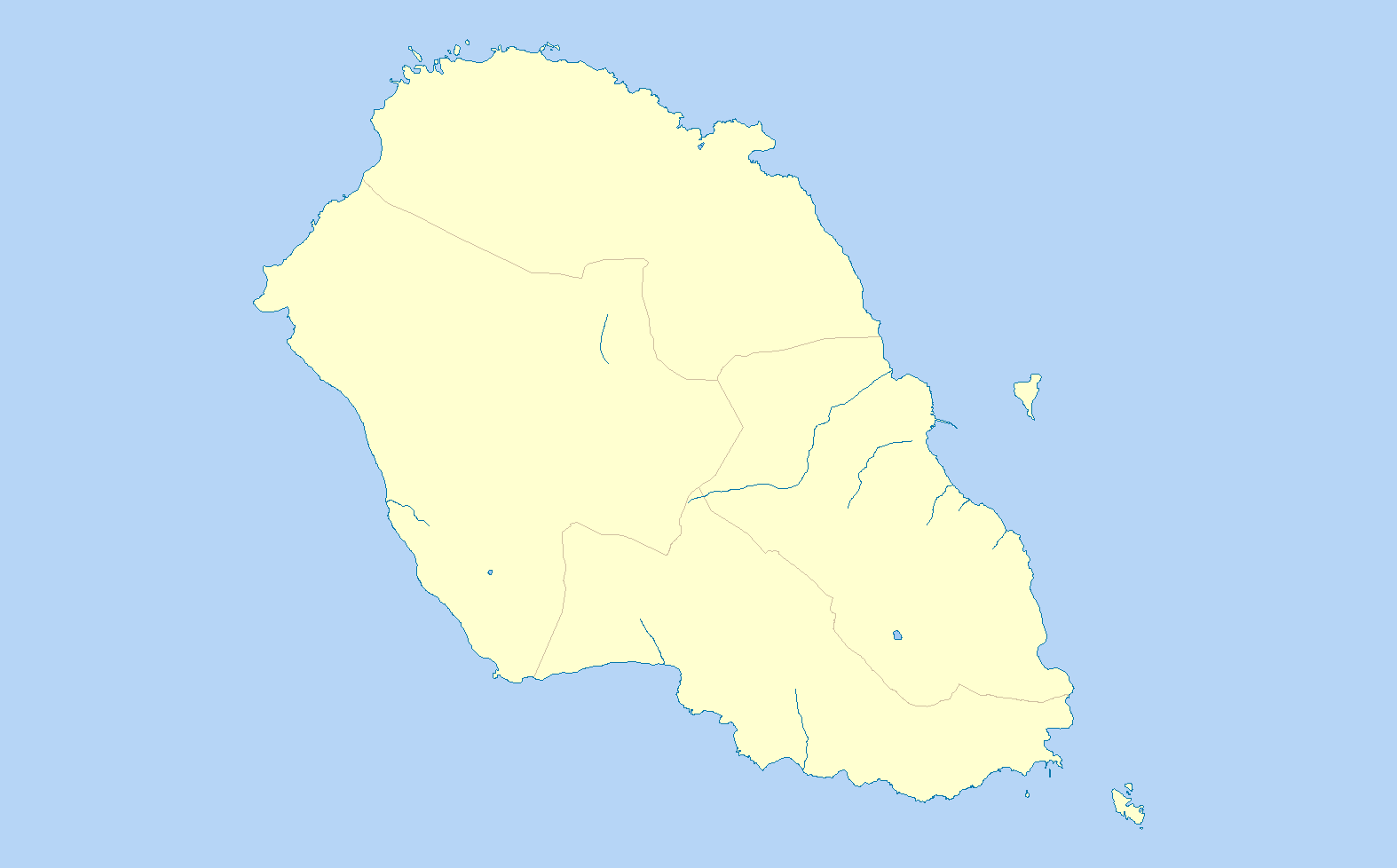
- Location of the islet off the coast of Graciosa
- Etymology: "praia" is Portuguese for "beach"; the islet is located in the harbor of the town Praia

Geography
- Location: Atlantic Ocean
- Coordinates: 39°03′24″N 27°57′18″W
- Area: 0.1 km^{2} (0.039 sq mi)

Administration
- Portugal
- Autonomous region: Azores

Demographics
- Population: uninhabited

Praia Islet (Portuguese: Ilhéu da Praia; literally, Beach Islet) is a highly vegetated uninhabited islet located approximately 1.5 kilometres (0.81 nmi; 0.93 mi) away from the town of Praia off the eastern coast of the island of Graciosa in the Portuguese archipelago of the Azores. Along with Baixo Islet to its south, Praia Islet is one of two main breeding places of Monteiro's storm petrel, an endemic marine bird of the Azores.

== History ==
On 7 February 2022 at 23:30—about half an hour after leaving the Port of Praia da Graciosa—the Portuguese fuel tanker ship São Jorge, which distributes liquid fuel throughout the Azores, ran aground off the coast of Praia Islet, causing severe damage to the ship's hull and propellers. Portos dos Açores, S.A. (the Azorean interisland port authority) stated that the ship's cargo of gasoline and diesel fuel did not leak as a result of the incident.

== Geography ==
Praia Islet is a basaltic, palagonite islet formed by pyroclastic lava flows during the Graciosa Caldera's last eruption. It measures about 10 or 11 hectares (25 or 27 acres), or 0.1 square kilometres (0.039 mi^{2}), in area and approximately 1.6 kilometres (0.99 mi) in perimeter. The islet's highest altitude is 51 metres (167 ft) above sea level.

The ocean is not very deep around the islet: its depth does not exceed 24 metres (79 ft) within a 500-metre (1,600 ft) radius around the islet. The ocean floor near Praia Islet consists of lava flows covered in boulders—much like the islet itself—with some small sandy patches in the deeper zones.

=== Biome ===
Praia Islet boasts deep soil and is highly vegetated, in contrast to some of the smaller Azorean islets. It is home to endemic Azorean flowering plants including Azorean carrot (Daucus carota azoricus), Azorean heather (Erica azorica), Festuca petraea, Carex vulcani, Spergularia azorica, Tolpis succulenta, and Azores bellflower (Azorina vidalii). These plants had to be reintroduced to the islet in the late 19th century, after extirpation of invasive rabbits.

The islet also serves as a marine bird sanctuary and breeding ground. Along with Baixo Islet to its south, Praia Islet is one of two main breeding places of Monteiro's storm petrel, an endemic marine bird of the Azores. Of the estimated 250 to 300 total breeding pairs of Monteiro's storm petrel, 71 nested on Praia Islet in 2009—up from 13 in 2001 when researchers first installed 151 artificial nests on the islet. Other seabirds breeding on the islet include band-rumped storm petrel, Barolo shearwater, Cory's shearwater, common tern, roseate tern, and sooty tern.

Terrestrial birds sometimes alight on Praia Islet. Researchers have observed Madeiran wall lizard—an introduced species endemic to Madeira—on the islet, which is of particular concern because the lizards occasionally predate on Monteiro's storm petrel chicks.

The waters around the islet are also biodiverse. They are home to barred hogfish (Bodianus scrofa), bluetail parrotfish (Sparisoma chrysopterum), bogue (Boops boops), and European spider crab (Maja squinado). Aquatic plants present in the area include the brown algae Cystoseira and Dictyota dichotoma, and the red algae Asparagopsis armata and Corallina officinalis.

Because the islet hosts endemic birds and plants, it is a protected natural area with restricted human access. Since March 1990 the islet has been protected through the European Environment Agency's Natura 2000 initiative and recognized as an Important Bird Area by BirdLife International. In 2008 the islet was protected locally as part of the Nature Park of Graciosa, one of the protected areas of the Azores. When ornithologists and other scientific researchers need to access Praia Islet, they do so easily by sea, as the islet has a small natural harbor.
