= Azores Geopark =

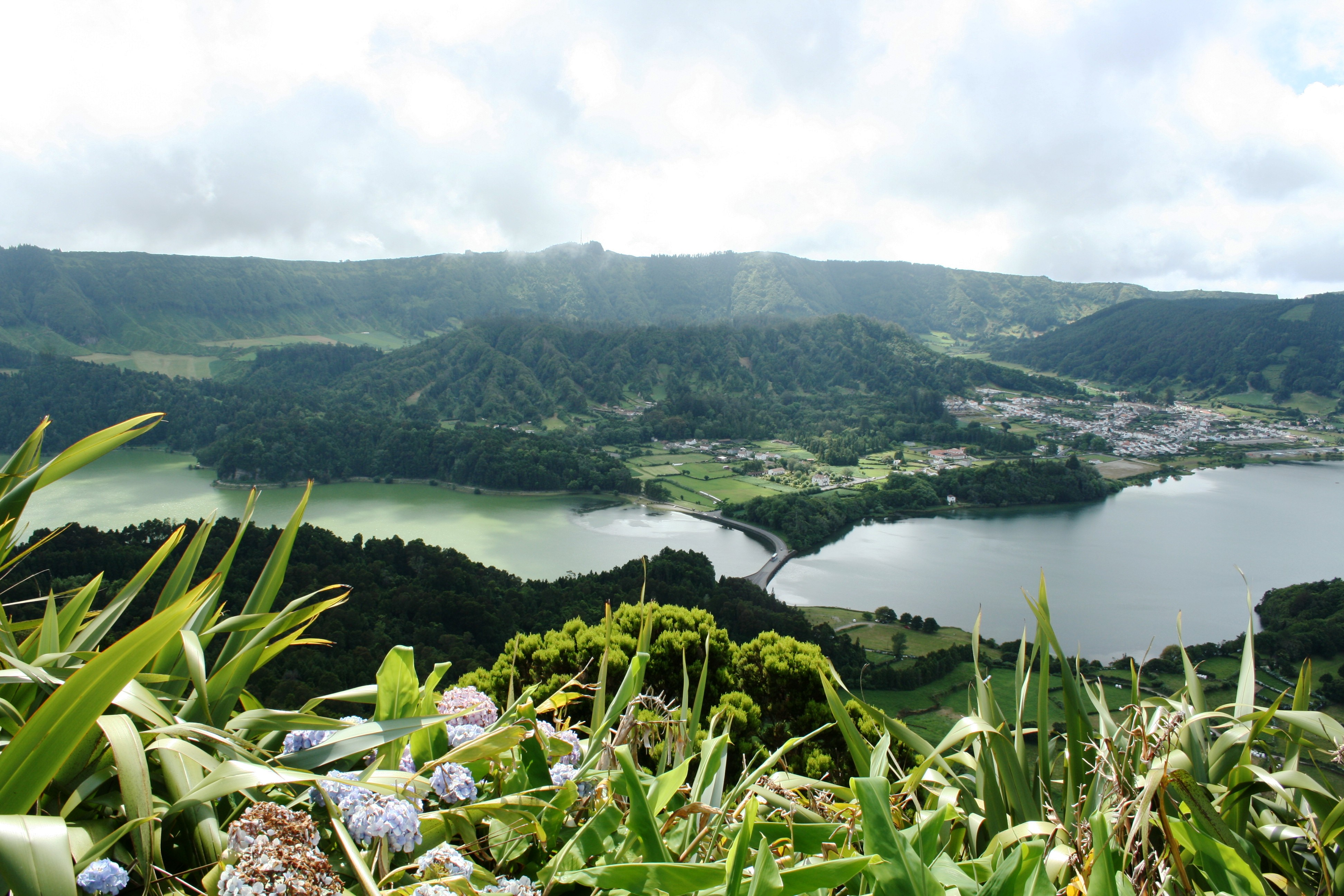
- The crater of the Sete Cidades Massif and iconic lagoons: one of the many natural and geomorphological sites that are part of the Geoparks program

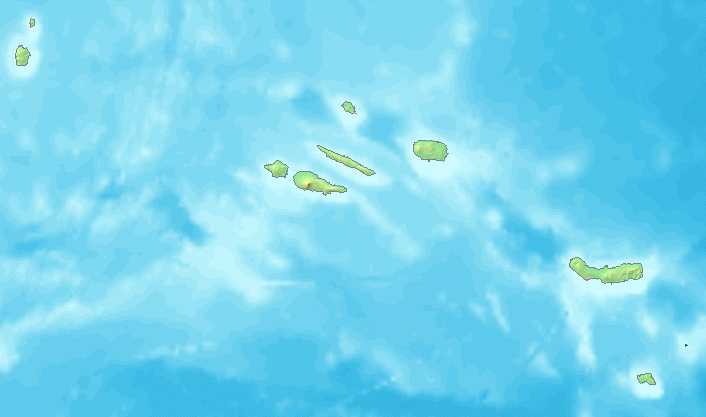
- Distribution of the islands of the archipelago of the Azores
- Location: Azores, Portugal
- Operator: Azores Geopark Association
- Website: www.azoresgeopark.com

The Azores Geopark (Portuguese: Geoparque Açores) is a network of 121 geographically-dispersed sites of geographic heritage and marine areas that covers the nine volcanic islands of the archipelago of the Azores. This network is managed by the Azores Geopark Association, a non-profit association, with its headquarters in Horta on the island of Faial, established 19 May 2010. It is part of the European Geoparks Network and the UNESCO Global Geoparks Network. The Association's mission is to ensure the geological conservation, environmental education and sustainable development, while promoting the well-being of the population and a respect for the environment.

== Geopark ==
The term is used to define a well-defined territory and boundary, whose existence is based on an exceptional geological heritage and a strategy that promotes the well-being of the population while maintaining a respect for the environment. Consequently, the Geopark includes a number of significant sites of geological interest, based on their unique or rare characteristics or which have a scientific, cultural, economic (tourist), scenic or aesthetic relevance. Similarly, if its ecology, history or cultural value, along with its thematic or comparable infrastructures can be interconnected in a network, by trails or routes.

Due to its nature, the geopark concept is based on several objectives:

- Conservation and preservation of geosites of particular importance, exploring and developing methods for geo-conservation, in order to protect the geological patrimony for future generations;
- Environmental education to promote public consciousness of the important geological heritage and its contribution to the surrounding environment; and to support scientific research and dissemination, as well as encouraging a dialogue between geoscientists and local communities;
- Stimulate economic activity and sustainable development, through the promotion of nature and rural tourism (Geotourism) for the socio-economic development of the local populations; and to develop an appreciation for the natural and cultural heritage, towards revitalizing traditional activities and products of excellence and quality.

== Geography ==
Situated 1,360 kilometres (850 mi) west of continental Portugal, about 880 kilometres (550 mi) northwest of Madeira and approximately 1,925 kilometres (1,196 mi) southeast of Newfoundland and Labrador, the Azores Geopark includes several geologically-significant sites throughout all nine islands and maritime seafloor of the Azores. There are 121 geosites in the nine islands, most of them with international or national relevance. The Geopark extends across an area of 12,884 square kilometres (4,975 mi^{2}), including 2,324 square kilometres (897 mi^{2}) of marine territory. Among these geosites, 57 were considered priority locations for the application of geoconservation strategies or for appreciation programs.

The archipelago of the Azores includes a rich and vast geodiversity, and an important geological heritage, comprising various locales of interest to the scientific and learning communities, in addition to its socio-economic importance to tourism. Due to it being an archipelago, the Azores Geopark is disperse: guaranteeing a representative geodiversity that characterizes the Azorean territory; manifesting in a history based on geological and active volcanism; with conservation strategies that are common; and based on a decentralized management structure with supports in all islands.

Characteristic of the Azorean geological history is a range of diverse features that includes (but is not limited to) volcanoes, calderas, lakes, lava fields, fumaroles, hot springs and thermal waters, volcanic caves, fajãs, fault scarps and marine fossil deposits. Beyond this heritage, there are other values of reference in the archipelago, such as its rich biodiversity, architecture, culture and ethnography.

=== Corvo ===
- COR 1 Caldeirão
- COR 2 Lava fajã of Vila do Corvo
- COR 3 Ponta do Marco
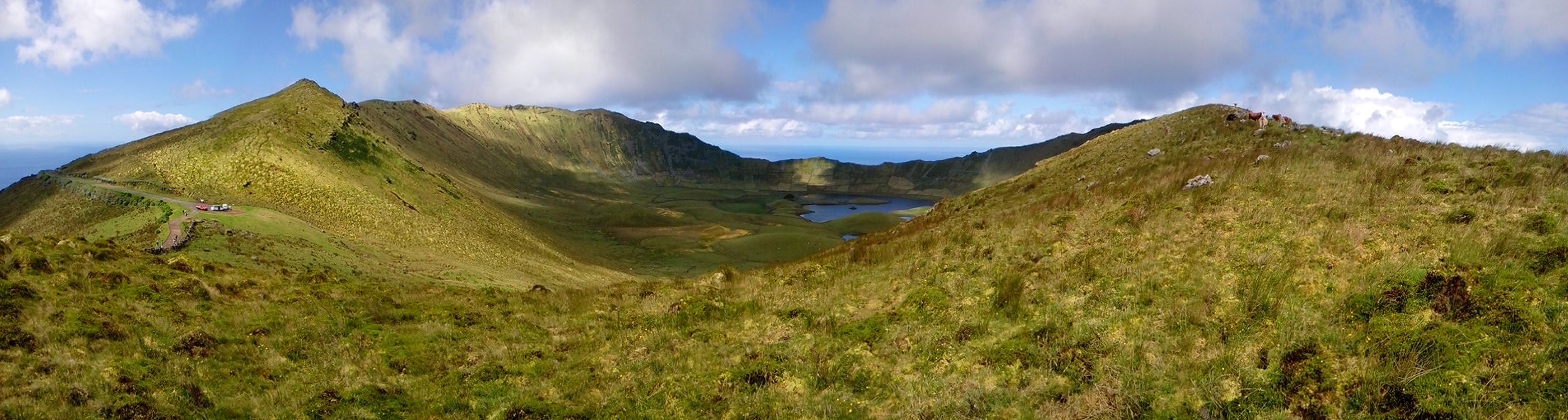
Panoramic view of the Caldeirão crater on the small island of Corvo

=== Flores ===
- FLO 1 Caldeira Negra, Caldeira Comprida, Caldeira Seca and Caldeira Branca
- FLO 2 Caldeira Funda and Caldeira Rasa
- FLO 3 Fajã Grande and Fajãzinha
- FLO 4 Pico da Sé
- FLO 5 Ponta da Rocha Alta and Fajã de Lopo Vaz
- FLO 6 Rocha dos Bordões
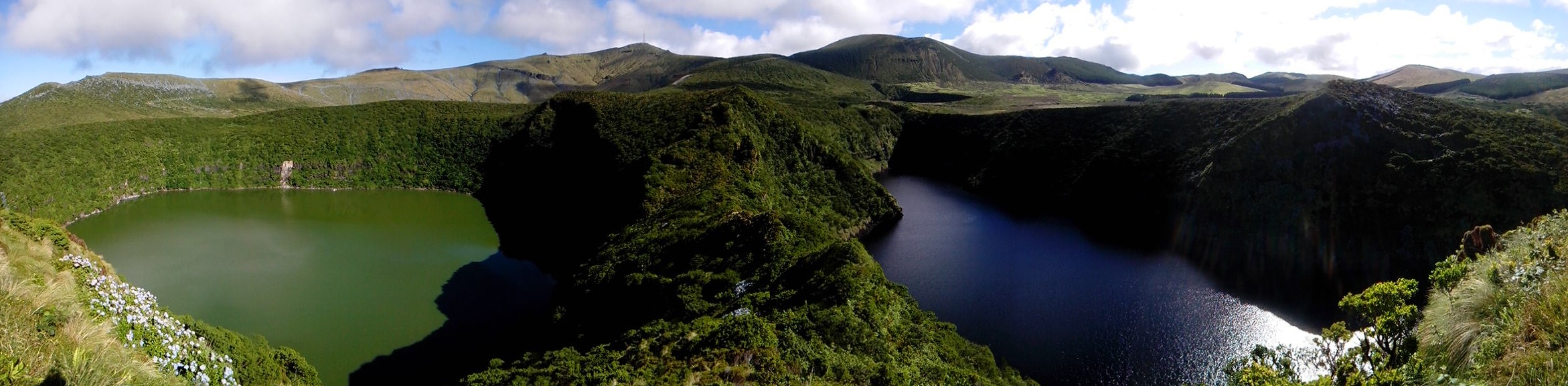
Panoramic view of Lagoa Funda and Lagoa Rasa in their respective calderas on the island of Flores

=== Faial ===
- FAI 1 Caldera
- FAI 2 Pedro Miguel Graben
- FAI 3 Monte da Guia
- FAI 4 Morro do Castelo Branco
- FAI 5 Capelo Peninsula
- FAI 6 Capelinhos e Costado da Nau
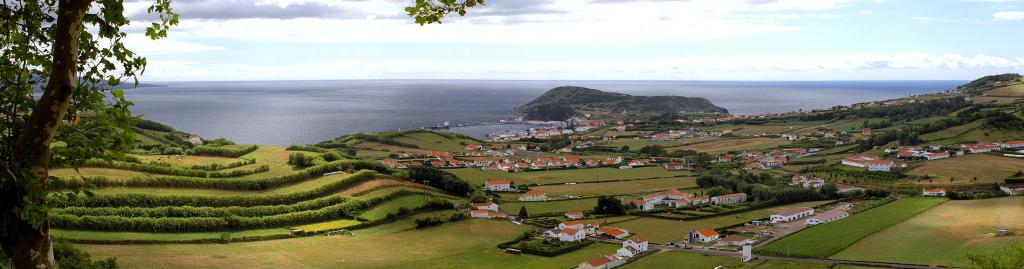
Panoramic view of the valley of Flamengos toward Monte da Guia on the island of Faial

=== Pico ===
- PIC 1 Fossil arriba of Santo António
- PIC 2 Lava fajã of Lajes do Pico
- PIC 3 Gruta das Torres
- PIC 4 Madalena Islets
- PIC 5 Lajido de Santa Luzia
- PIC 6 Mount Pico
- PIC 7 Achada Plateau
- PIC 8 Ponta da Ilha
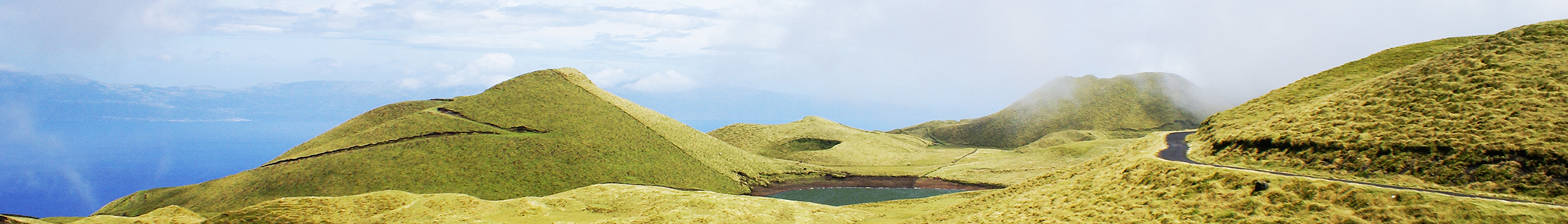
Panoramic view of the Achada Plateau

=== São Jorge ===
- SJO 1 Arribas of Fajã dos Vimes and Fajã de São João
- SJO 2 Central volcanic cordilhera
- SJO 3 Fajã do Ouvidor and Fajã da Ribeira da Areia
- SJO 4 Fajãs dos Cubres and Fajã da Caldeira do Santo Cristo
- SJO 5 Morro de Velas and Morro de Lemos

=== Graciosa ===
- GRA 1 Caldera and Furna do Enxofre
- GRA 2 Caldera Pêro Botelho
- GRA 3 Ponta da Barca and Baleia Islet
- GRA 4 Porto Afonso
- GRA 5 Ponta do Carapacho, Ponta da Restinga and Baixo Islet

=== Terceira ===
- TER 1 Algar do Carvão
- TER 3 Guilherme Moniz Caldera
- TER 2 Santa Bárbara Caldera and Mistérios Negros
- TER 4 Furnas do Enxofre
- TER 5 Monte Brasil
- TER 6 Pico Alto, Biscoito Rachado and Biscoito da Ferraria
- TER 7 Ponta da Serreta and Trachyte lava flows

=== São Miguel ===
- SMG 1 Furnas Caldera
- SMG 2 Sete Cidades Caldera
- SMG 3 Fogo Caldera
- SMG 4 Caldeira Velha
- SMG 5 Gruta do Carvão
- SMG 6 Vila Franca Islet
- SMG 7 Lagoas do Congro and Lagoa dos Nenúfares
- SMG 8 Ponta da Ferraria and Pico das Camarinhas
- SMG 9 Serra Devassa
- SMG 10 Vale da Ribeira do Faial da Terra and Fajã do Calhau

=== Santa Maria ===
- SMA 1 Barreiro da Faneca
- SMA 2 Pedreira do Campo
- SMA 3 Poço da Pedreira
- SMA 4 Ponta do Castelo
- SMA 5 Ribeira do Maloás

=== EEZ ===
- MAR 1 Dom João de Castro Bank
- MAR 2 Mid-Atlantic Ridge and hydrothermal vents

== Environmental awareness ==
The Geopark implemented various routes and trails on every island to discover the volcanic landscapes. Moreover, many educational activities are organized throughout the year to increase the environmental awareness.
