= Baixo Islet =

Islet in the Azores, Portugal

Native name: Ilhéu de Baixo Nickname: Ilhéu do Carapacho; Ilhéu dos Homiziados
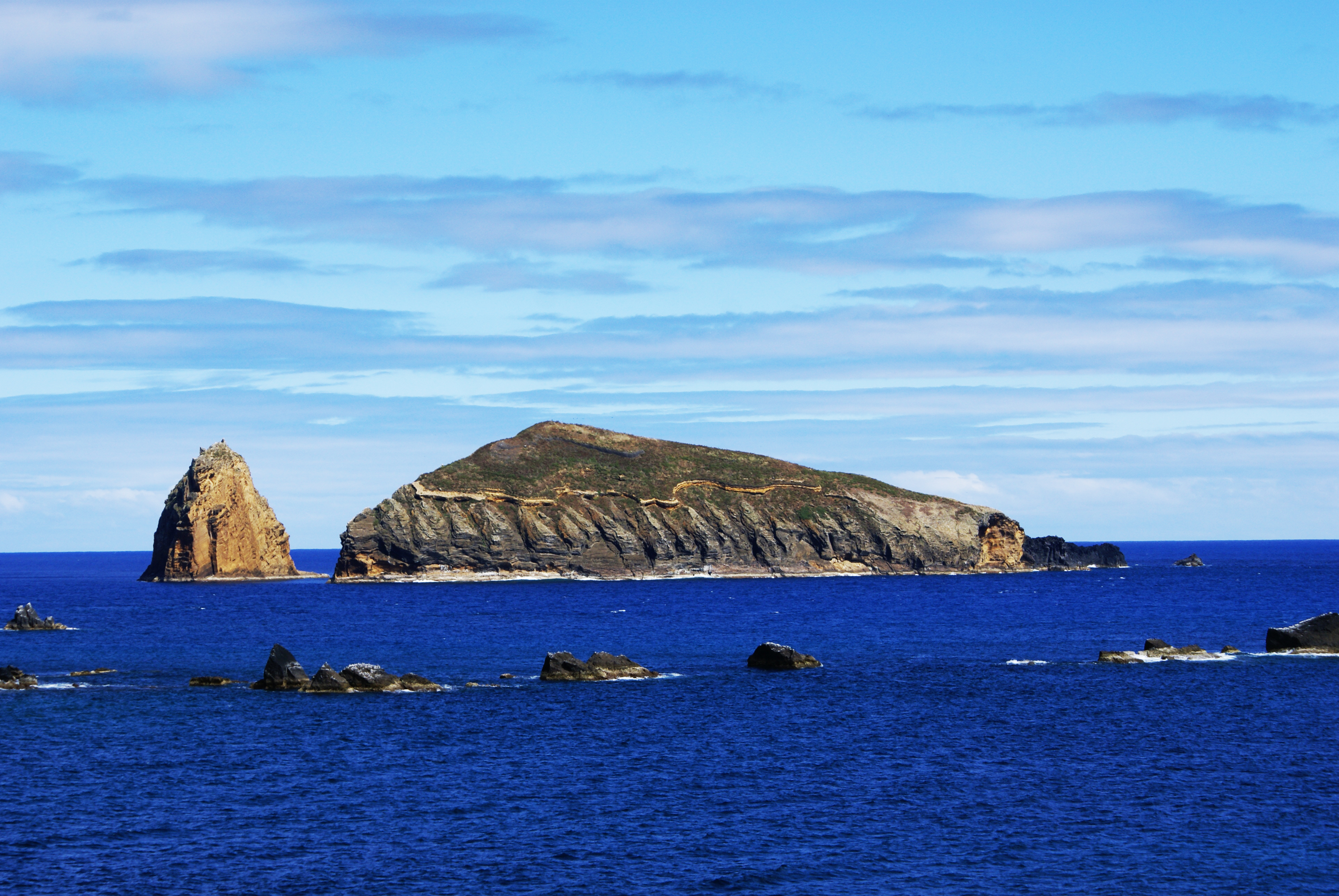
- The islet seen from Graciosa

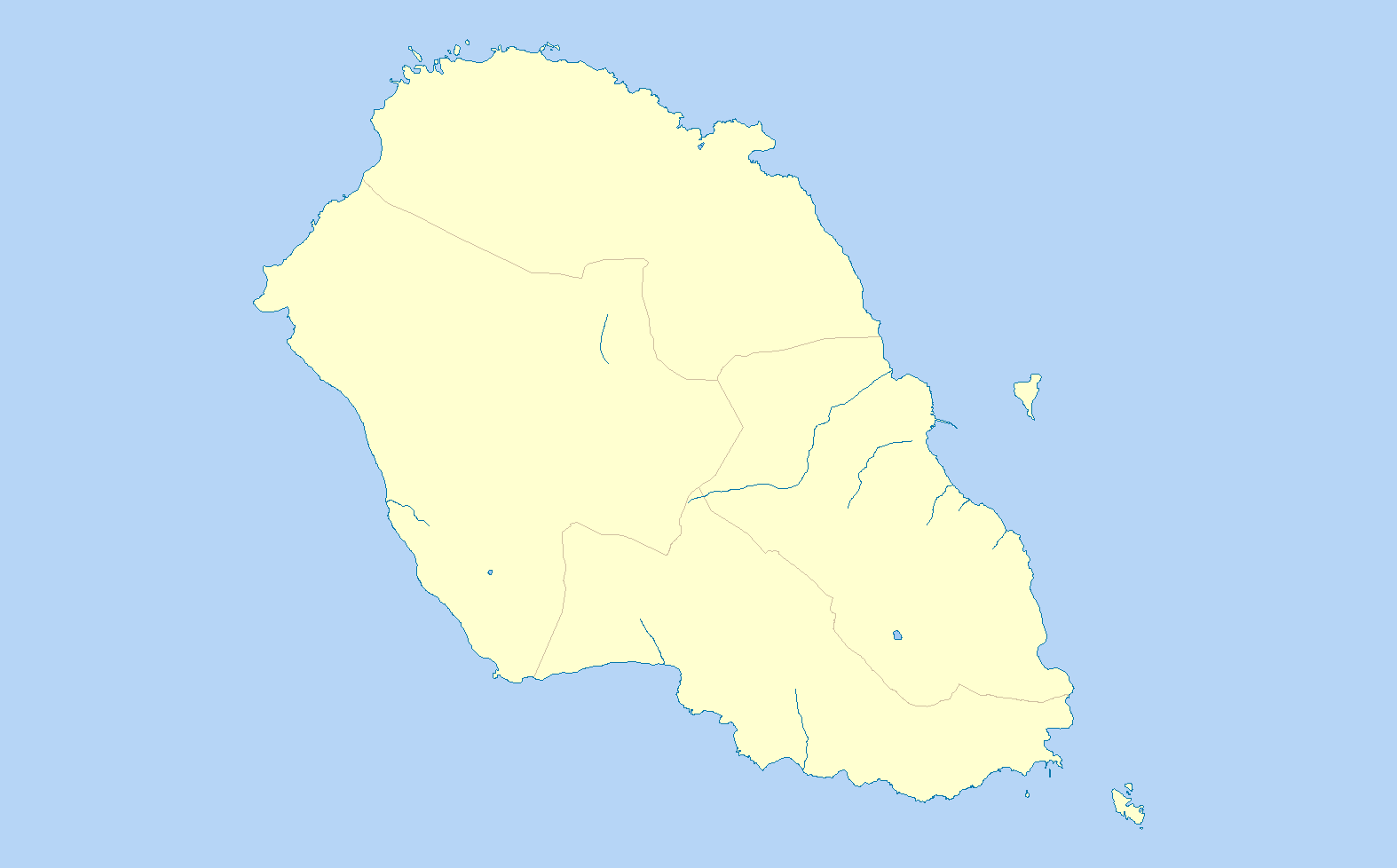
- Location of the islet off the coast of Graciosa

Geography
- Location: Atlantic Ocean
- Coordinates: 39°00′29″N 27°56′24″W
- Area: 0.09 km^{2} (0.035 sq mi)

Administration
- Portugal
- Autonomous region: Azores

Demographics
- Population: uninhabited

Baixo Islet (Portuguese: Ilhéu de Baixo; Lower Islet in English), also known locally as Ilhéu do Carapacho (Carapace Islet) and historically as Ilhéu dos Homiziados (Islet of the Fugitives), is a small uninhabited islet group located off the southeast coast of the island of Graciosa in the Portuguese archipelago of the Azores. Along with Praia Islet to its north, Baixo Islet is one of two main breeding places of Monteiro's storm petrel, an endemic marine bird of the Azores.

== Geography ==
Baixo Islet is in fact two basaltic islets, one much larger than the other. The islets are the exposed remains of a Surtseyan cone composed of volcanic tuff rock, heavily eroded by the ocean and seismic activity. The larger main islet is located about 700 metres (2,300 ft) southeastof Ponta da Restinga (Restinga Point), which is a small peninsula of Graciosa. It measures 9 hectares (22 acres) or 0.09 square kilometres (0.035 mi^{2}) in area, with a highest point of 74 metres (243 ft) above sea level.

=== Biome ===
The islet and its exposed sea cliffs provide a habitat for flowering coastal plants endemic to the Azores, some of which are endangered, including Azorean forget-me-not (Myosotis azorica), Azorean spurge or erva-leiteira (Euphorbia azorica), bracel-da-rocha fescue grass (Festuca petraea), Spergularia azorica, and vidália (Azorina vidalii).

Thanks to limited human access and a lack of predatory mammals such as cats, rats, and ferrets, the islet shelters a variety of marine birds. Along with Praia Islet to its north, Baixo Islet is one of two main breeding places of Monteiro's storm petrel, an endemic marine bird of the Azores. Other marine birds present on the islet include band-rumped storm petrel, Barolo shearwater, black-headed gull, Bulwer's petrel, common tern, Cory's shearwater, Eurasian whimbrel, Fea's petrel, great black-backed gull, grey heron, Kentish plover, little egret, ruddy turnstone, sanderling, and yellow-legged gull.

This biodiversity and abundance of endemic species led to the creation of a conservation area around the islet called the Zona Especial de Conservação do Ilhéu de Baixo e Ponta da Restinga (Baixo Islet and Restinga Point Special Conservation Zone). The conservation zone is part of the Nature Park of Graciosa, one of the locally protected areas of the Azores. Since March 1990 the islet has been protected through the European Environment Agency's Natura 2000 initiative under the Habitats Directive and Birds Directive.

== History ==
Human access to the islet is infrequent and only possible by small boat.

Historically the islet was known as Ilhéu dos Homiziados (Islet of the Fugitives). According to Azorean chronicler Gaspar Frutuoso in his publication Saudades da Terra, the moniker derived from a possibly apocryphal 1541 occurrence. Seven young men landed on the island for recreational purposes and were trapped overnight by rough seas. Five of their friends jocularly referred to them as os homiziados (the fugitives) and endeavored to rescue them. Unfortunately, en route to the islet the rescuers' boat capsized, killing four of them.

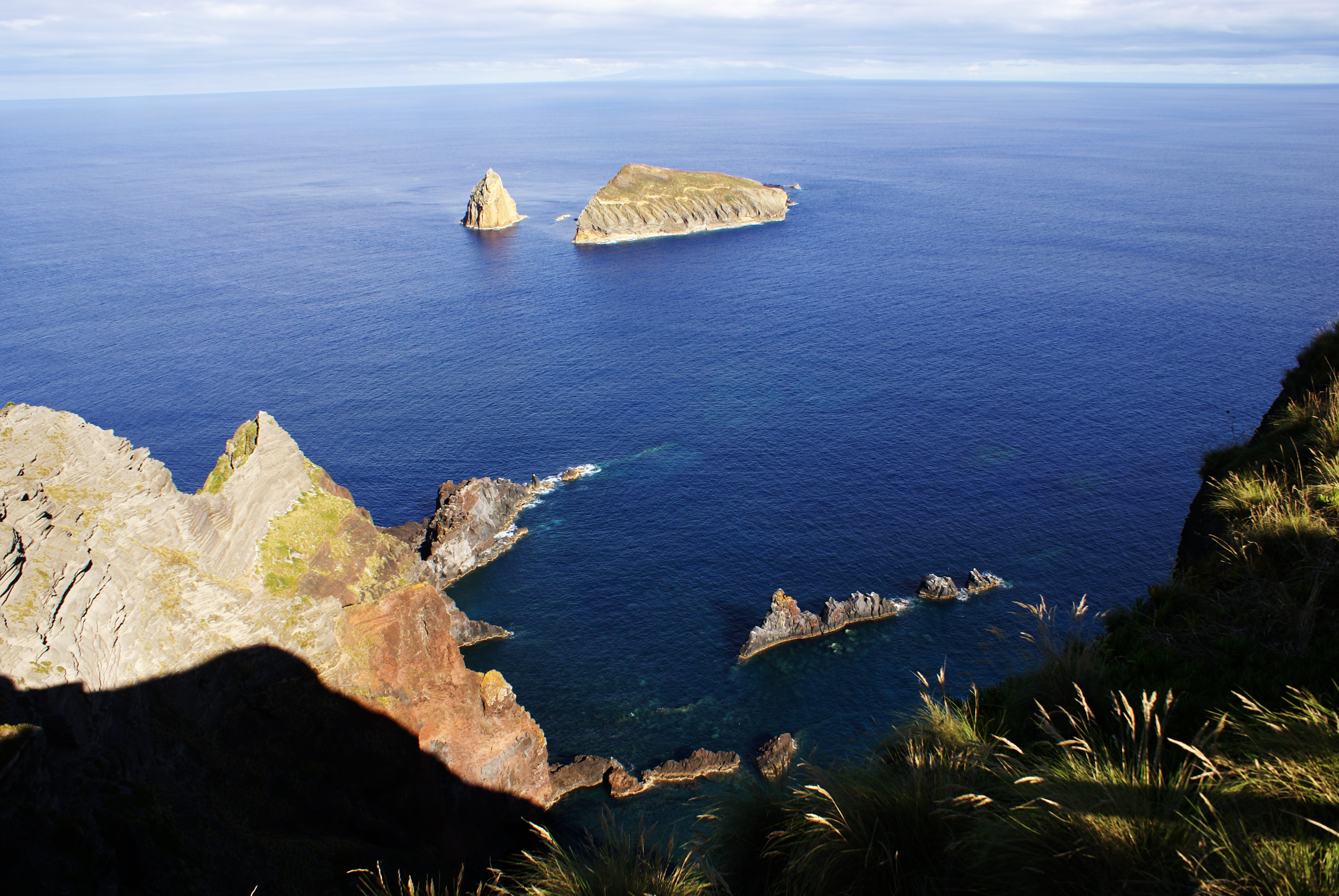
Ilhéu de Baixo as seen from Ponta da Restinga on Graciosa
