= Protected Landscape of Barreiro da Faneca =

- IUCN category V (protected landscape/seascape)
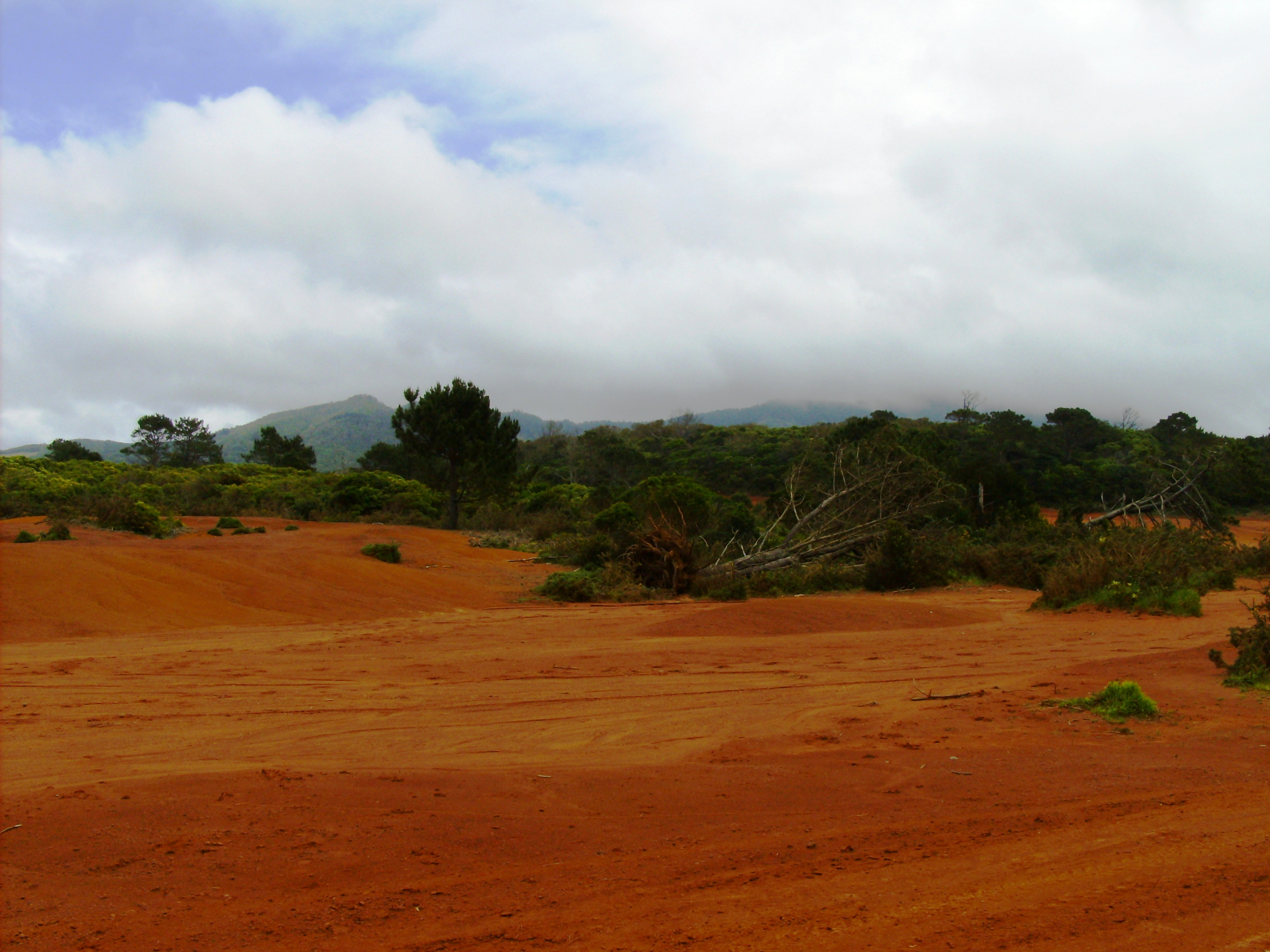
- A view of the "painted desert" of Barreiro da Faneca

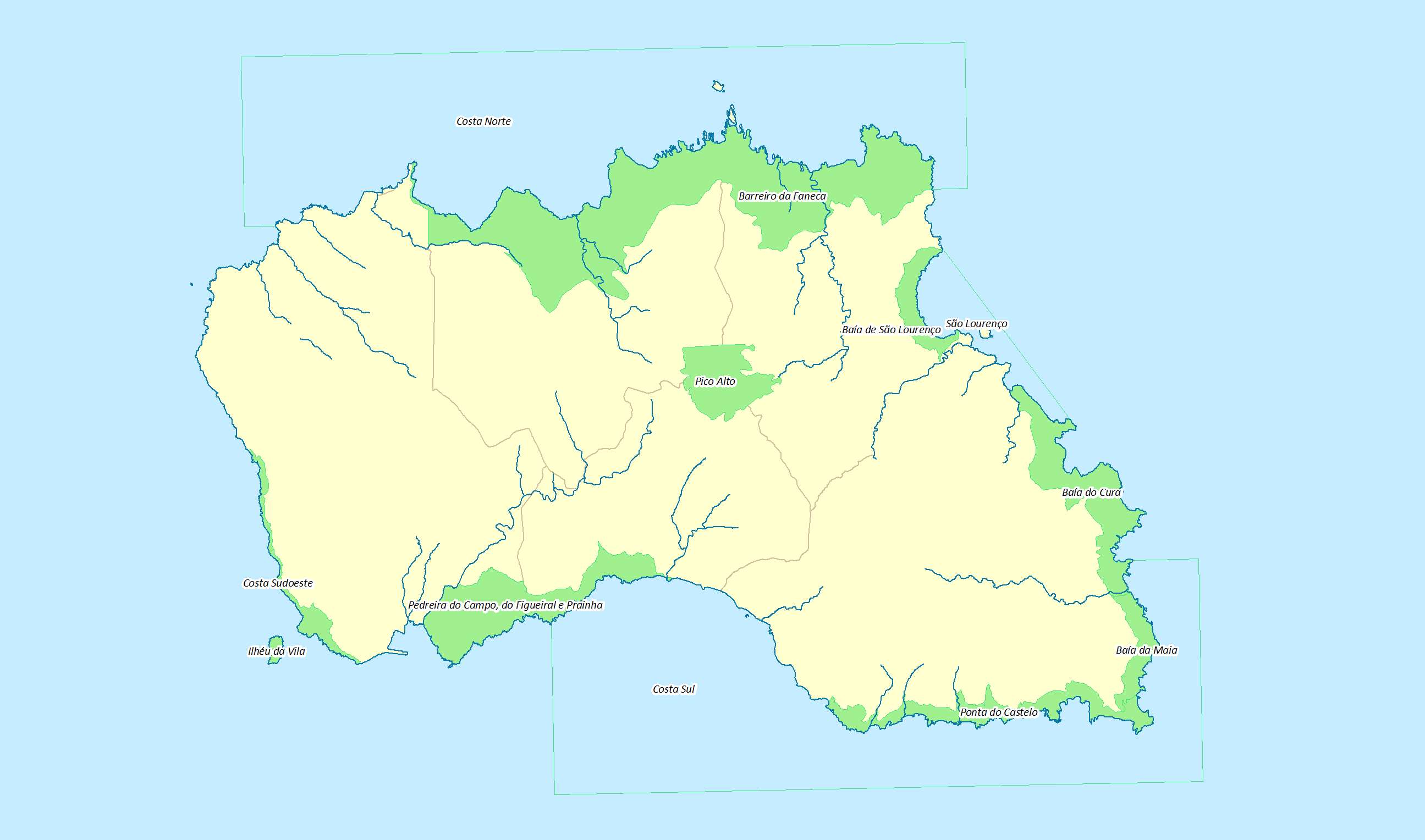
- Location within Nature Park of Santa Maria
- Location: Santa Maria, Eastern Group, Azores, Portugal
- Coordinates: 36°59′56.99″N 25°7′22.55″W
- Area: 8.35 km^{2} (3.22 sq mi)
- Elevation: 210 m (690 ft)
- Established: 2008
- Named for: A Barreiro (Portuguese for a "clayey area")
- Operator: Secretário Regional do Ambiente e do Mar

The Protected Landscape of Barreiro da Faneca (Portuguese: Área de Paisagem Protegida do Barreiro da Faneca) is a geological region and protected landscape of the Portuguese island of Santa Maria, Azores. The protected area is given its name by the Barreiro da Faneca, nicknamed the "Red Desert of the Azores", an arid and clayey landscape formed during the Pliocene, unique not only to the island but to all of Portugal.

== History ==
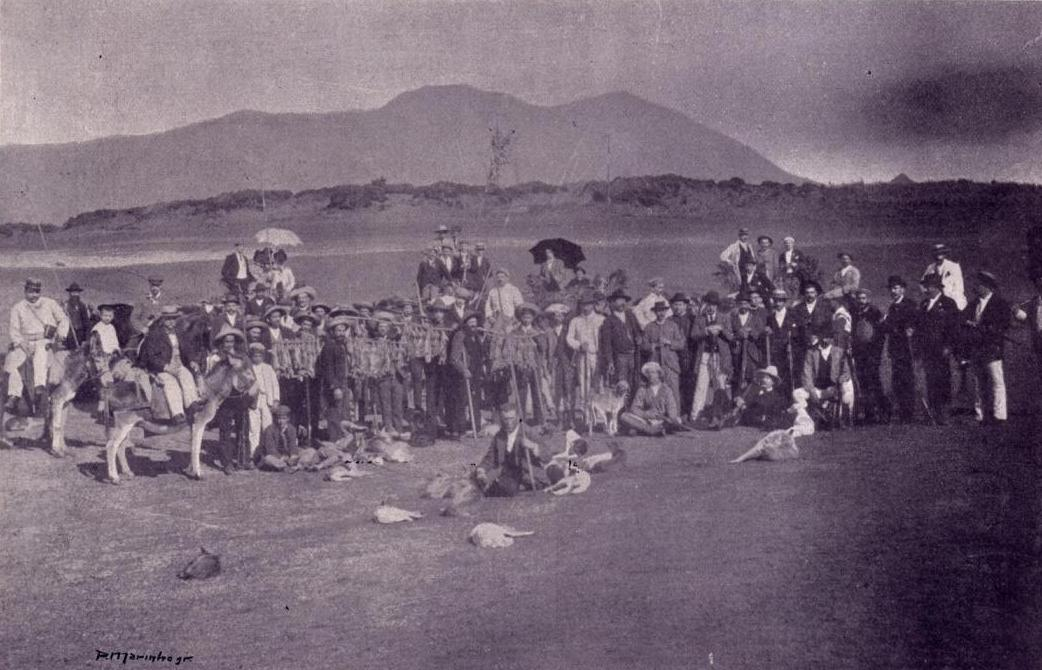
A rabbit hunt along the Faneca at the turn of the century (1903)

The Barreiro da Faneca was integrated into the Área de Paisagem Protegida do Barreiro da Faneca (Protected Landscape of Barreiro da Faneca) with the promulgation of Regional Decree 47/2008/A (7 November 2008), administered by the Secretário Regional do Ambiente e do Mar (Regional Secretariat of the Environment and the Sea).

== Geography ==
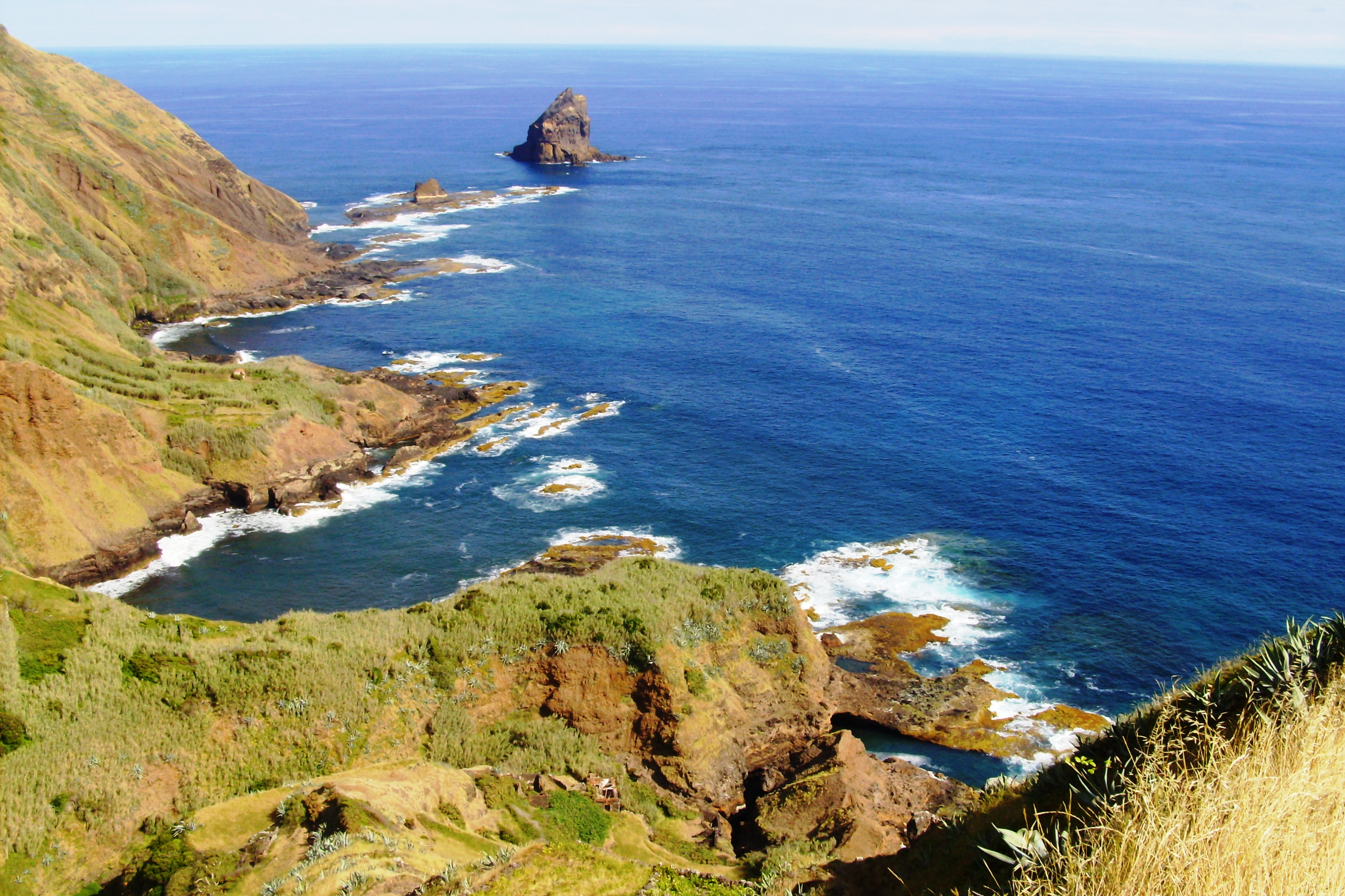
The bay of Tagarete (from the west) on the edge of the northern plateau, alongside the Faneca (with islet of Lagoinhas in the background)

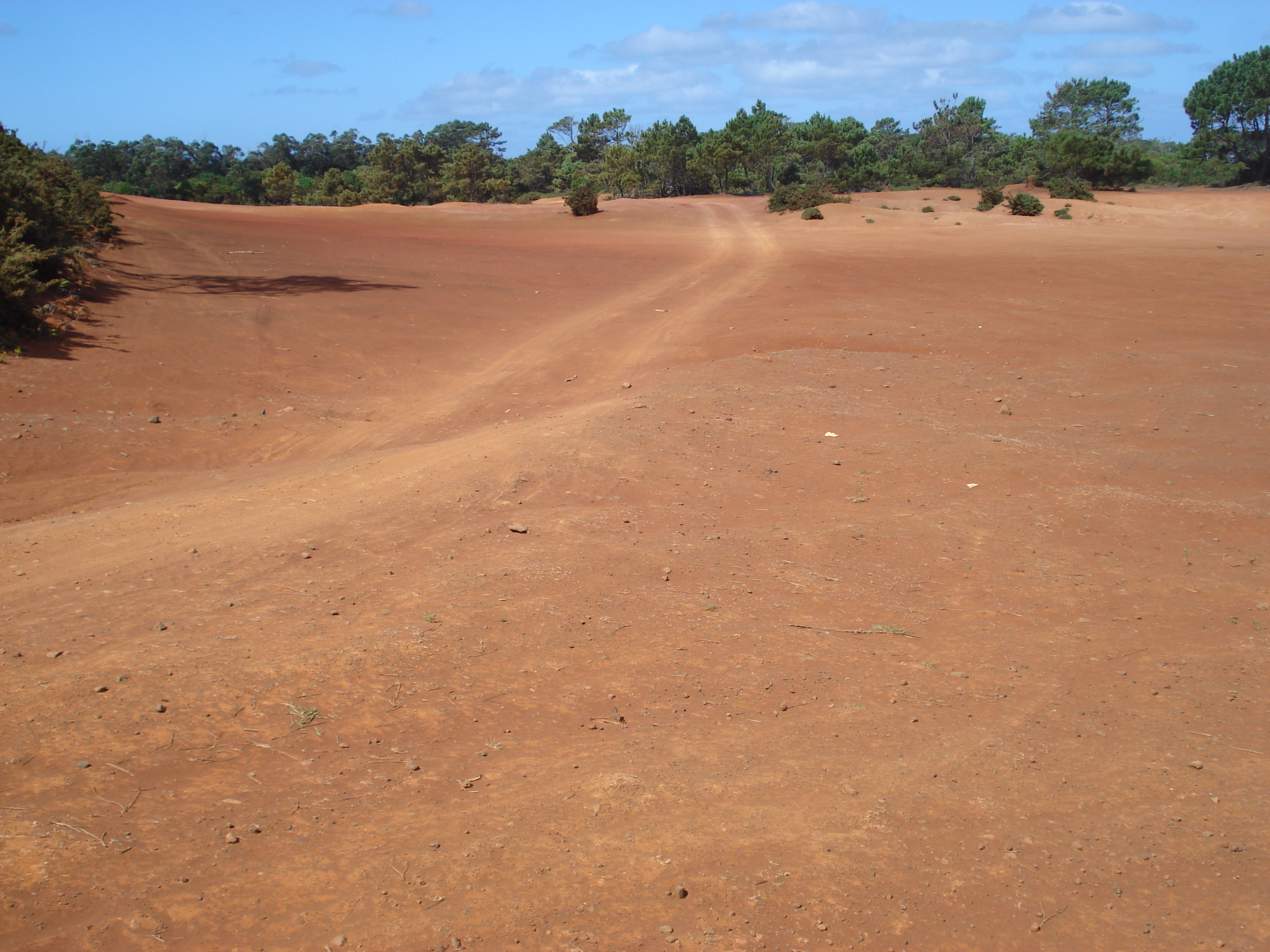
An early 21st century view of the arid reddish clays of the area

The Protected Landscape of Barreiro da Faneca occupies most of the northern coast of the island, extending from Ponta dos Frades, a promontory on the locality of Anjos, on westernmost São Pedro to the northernmost cliff of Santa Bárbara and the island, and includes not only Barreiro da Faneca but also the bays of Raposo, Cré and Tagarete; the protected area occupies around 8.35 km^{2} (3.22 sq mi) Contiguous to the protected area is the Bay of Cré, known for the accumulation of sediments, such as limestone and fossilized conglomerates, with visible marine fossils. The nearby Bay of Raposo is known for its cliffs, waterfall and river mouth, while the Bay of Tagarete is also known for deposits of marine fossils.

=== Physical geography ===
Barreiro da Faneca, along with other clayey areas of the island, is part of the geological formation known as the Feteiras Formation, the last series of volcanic eruptions on Santa Maria, the oldest island in the Azores. These clays were initially basalts formed during the Pliocene (approximately 3-4 million years ago) which were then covered by a layer of pyroclasts as a result of an essentially explosive eruption. Due to the hot and humid climate present during that epoch, the basalts were intensely altered and eroded, originating the current reddish clays and the associated semi-desert-like landscape.

The Barreiro is situated at an altitude of 210 metres (690 ft) and includes a hummocky surface, with gentle slopes of 4-5% incline and a limited drainage capability. The areas with limited or lacking vegetation are susceptible to erosion, resulting in the formation of dunes caused by surface runoff or wind-based erosion. These conditions have resulted in a landscape that is completely unique to Santa Maria and the archipelago, resulting in its nickname, the Red Desert of the Azores.

=== Biome ===
The biome of the landscape has changed a lot since its formation, with its characteristic barren terrain becoming progressively smaller as native plants gain territory. The protected area outside of the red desert, which accounts for 70% of the total area, includes endemic species such as the Azorean Heather (Erica azorica), the white wood (Picconia azorica), the Azores laurel (Laurus azorica), Myrica faya, Scabiosa nitens, Euphorbia azorica, Azorina vidalii, Aichryson santamariensis, Tolpis succulenta, Pericallis malvifolia, Asplenium azoricum, Centaurium tenuiflorum, but also the introduced Persea indica, Polygonum hydropiperoides, Elaeagnus umbellata, Oxalis purpurea and Agave americana.

The group of bays are limited by large cliffs with extreme slopes, with altitudes ranging from 50 to 150 metres (160 to 490 ft) above sea level, and are recognized for their ecological importance and distinct landscapes, that include the islet of Lagoinhas, known for support of marine bird habits and populations of migratory and marine birds like Shearwaters (Calonectris borealis) and terns (Sterna hirundo and Sterna dougallii).
