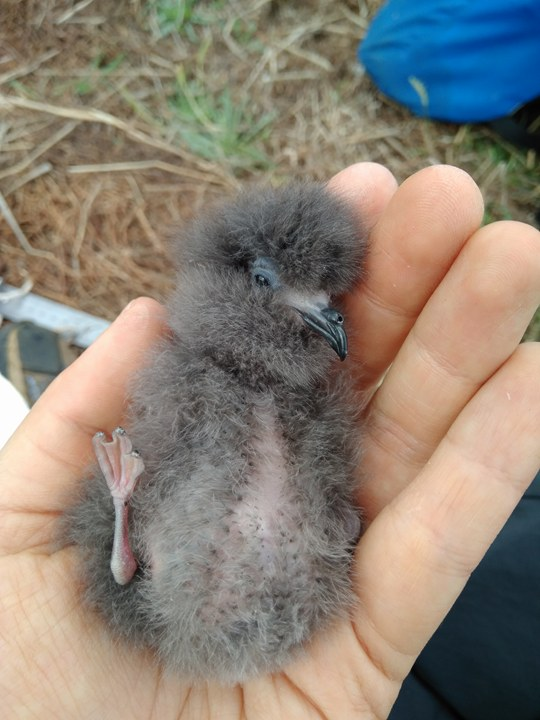
- Monteiro's storm petrel chick

Conservation status
- Vulnerable (IUCN 3.1)

Scientific classification
- Kingdom: Animalia
- Phylum: Chordata
- Class: Aves
- Order: Procellariiformes
- Family: Hydrobatidae
- Genus: Hydrobates
- Species: H. monteiroi

Binomial name
- Hydrobates monteiroi (Bolton et al., 2008)

Synonyms
- Oceanodroma monteiroi

= Monteiro's storm petrel =

Species of bird

Monteiro's storm petrel (Hydrobates monteiroi) is a seabird species from the storm petrel family, Hydrobatidae. The cryptic species was once considered to be conspecific with the band-rumped storm petrel. The species is endemic to the Azores.

== Taxonomy ==
The existence of a separate species was first hinted at by the discovery of two distinct breeding seasons of Hydrobates storm-petrels in the Azores. Both populations were initially thought to be of band-rumped storm petrels; however, one population breeds during the cool season, and the other during the hot season. A closer study of these two breeding populations found differences in their morphology and moult. Examination of the mtDNA found that the two populations were indeed genetically isolated, and the hot-season-breeding population was elevated to full species rank, Hydrobates monteiroi, Monteiro's storm petrel. The species is named for biologist Dr Luis Monteiro, who was the first to notice morphological and acoustic differences between the two seasonal populations from the Azores.

It was formerly defined in the genus Oceanodroma before that genus was synonymized with Hydrobates.

== Breeding ==
Monteiro's storm petrel is only known to breed on a few islets in the Azores, with most breeding occurring on the Baixo and Praia islets off the coast of Graciosa. Like in all Procellariiformes, a single egg is laid and is incubated by both parents. Laying occurs between late April and early July (in contrast to the band-rumped storm petrel, which on these islands lays between October and December). The earliest chicks hatch in June and the last chicks fledge by October. The young will return to the colony from 2 years old onwards.

== Foraging ecology ==
The species is thought to forage in the local seas all year round, possibly near the breeding sites; this is in contrast to the band-rumped storm petrel, which disperses to the West Atlantic. The diet of Monteiro's storm-petrel is unknown, but analyses of stable isotopes in the feathers suggest that it differs from that of the band-rumped storm petrel as well. Monteiro's storm-petrels feed at the sea surface, but they can also forage underwater by performing shallow dives of 85 centimetres (33 in) on average.

== Conservation ==
The species has a low reproductive output due to competition with other burrowing petrels, and some years, the young and some prospectors are preyed upon by the long-eared owl. The species has been assessed as Vulnerable by the IUCN because of its small population (estimated at 250–300 breeding pairs in 1999 and 328–378 pairs in 2016) and restricted breeding range.
