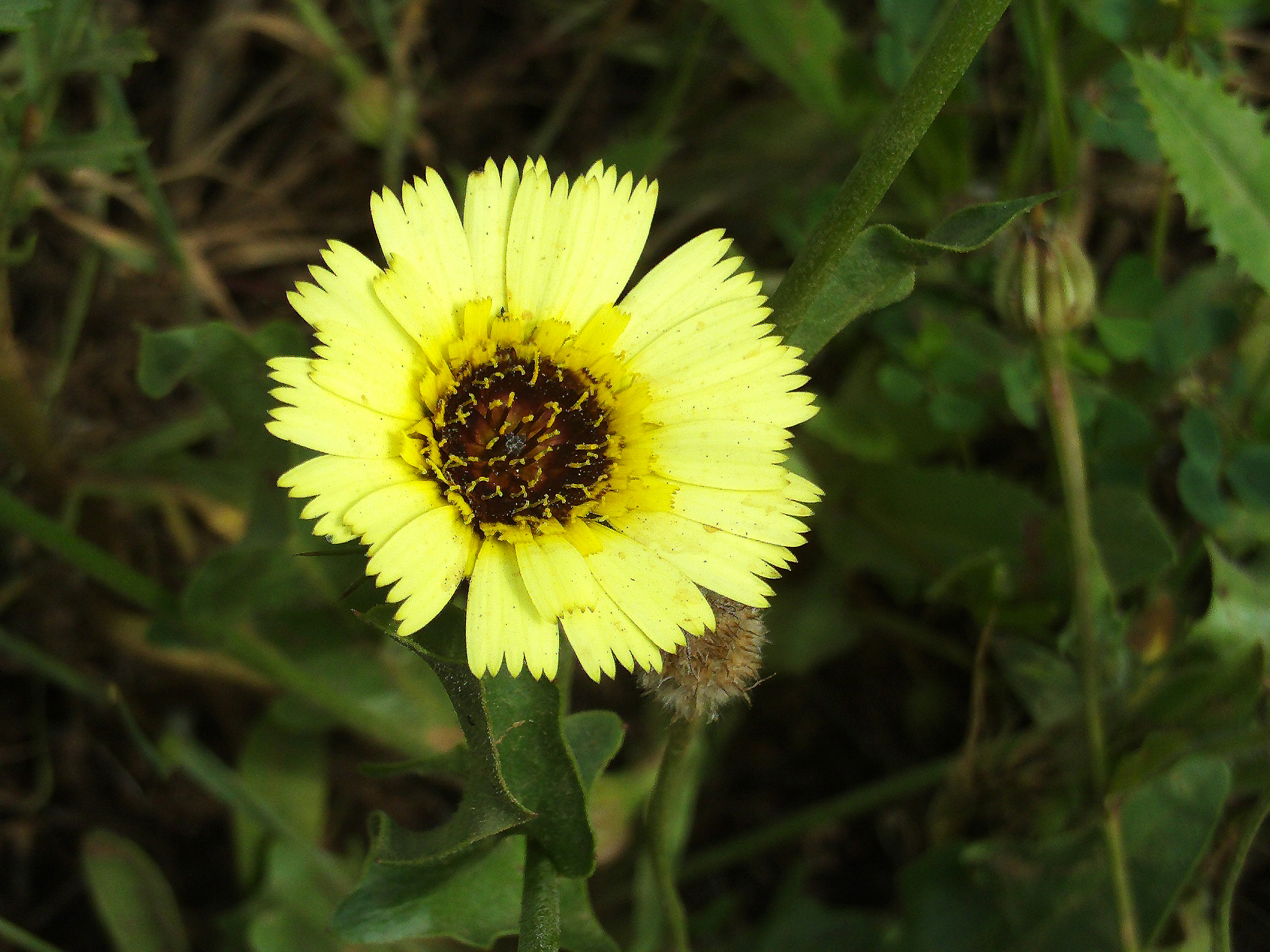

Scientific classification
- Kingdom: Plantae
- Clade: Tracheophytes
- Clade: Angiosperms
- Clade: Eudicots
- Clade: Asterids
- Order: Asterales
- Family: Asteraceae
- Genus: Tolpis
- Species: T. barbata

Binomial name
- Tolpis barbata (L.) Gaertn.

Synonyms
- Crepis barbata Tolpis umbellata

= Tolpis barbata =

Species of plant

Tolpis barbata is a species of flowering plant in the family Asteraceae known by the common name European umbrella milkwort. It is native to southern Europe, including the Mediterranean, namely in Portugal, Spain, Morocco, Algeria, Tunisia and the British territory of Gibraltar and it is known in many other places as an introduced species and a common weed, such as in California and New South Wales.
