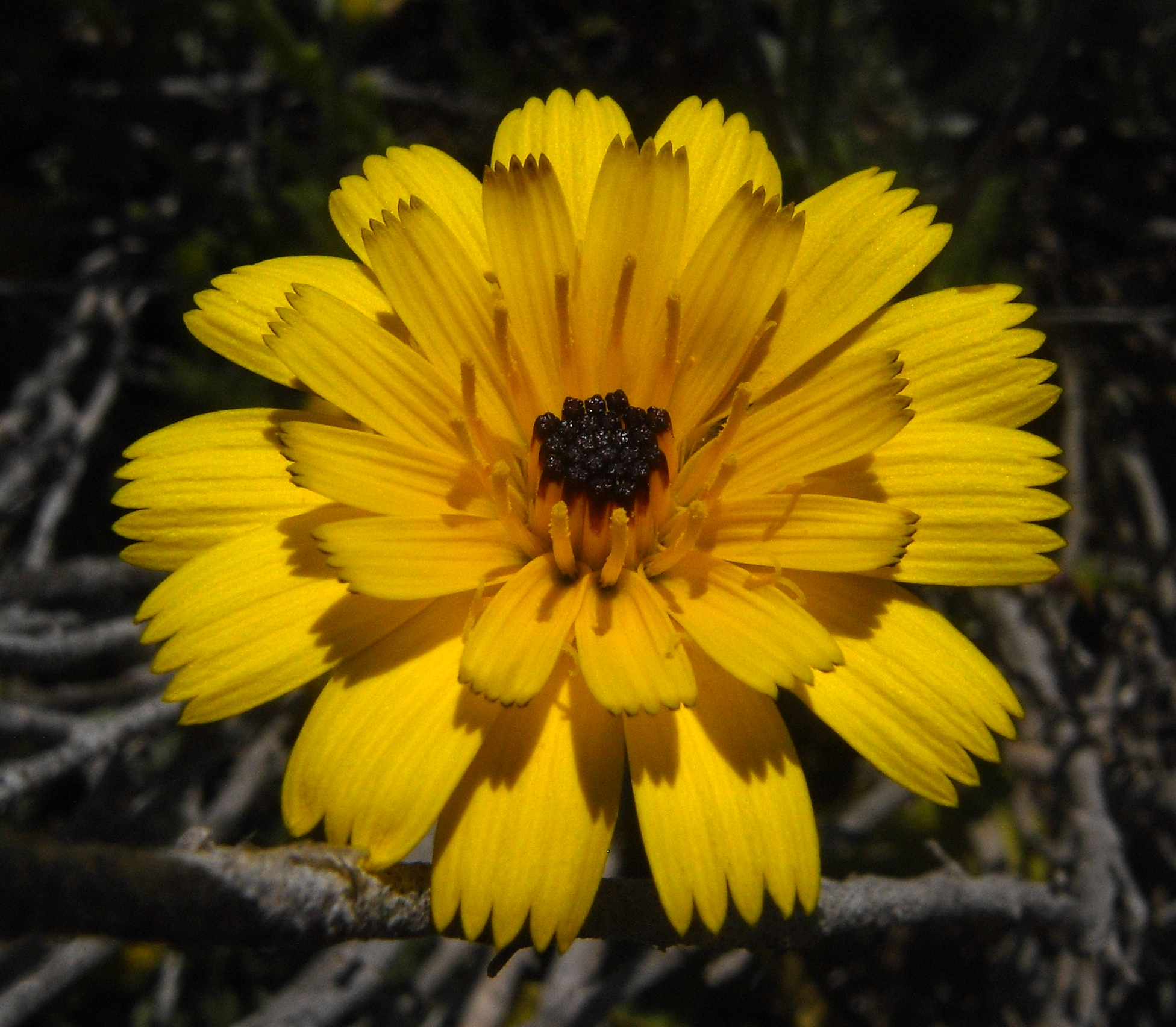
- Tolpis barbata

Scientific classification
- Kingdom: Plantae
- Clade: Embryophytes
- Clade: Tracheophytes
- Clade: Spermatophytes
- Clade: Angiosperms
- Clade: Eudicots
- Clade: Asterids
- Order: Asterales
- Family: Asteraceae
- Subfamily: Cichorioideae
- Tribe: Cichorieae
- Subtribe: Cichoriinae
- Genus: Tolpis; Adans.

Type species
- Tolpis barbata (L.) Gaertn.

Synonyms
- Chlorocrepis Griseb.; Calodonta Nutt.; Drepania Juss.; Aethonia D.Don; Schmidtia Moench 1802, rejected homonym not Tratt. 1816 nor Steud. ex J.A. Schmidt 1852; Chatelania Neck.

= Tolpis =

Genus of plants

Tolpis is a genus of flowering plants in the tribe Cichorieae within the family Asteraceae. It is native to Africa, Southern Europe, the Middle East and Macaronesia. Many species are limited to the Canary Islands.

Species

- Tolpis × grossii Talavera
- Tolpis azorica (Nutt.) P.Silva - Azores
- Tolpis barbata (L.) Gaertn. - Spain, Portugal, Morocco, Algeria, Tunisia
- Tolpis calderae Bolle - La Palma in Canary Islands
- Tolpis capensis (L.) Sch.Bip. - Africa (from Ethiopia to Cape Province), Madagascar
- Tolpis coronopifolia (Desf.) Biv. - La Palma + Gran Canaria + Tenerife in Canary Islands
- Tolpis crassiuscula Svent. - Tenerife in Canary Islands
- Tolpis crithmifolia DC.
- Tolpis farinulosa (Webb) Walp. - Cape Verde
- Tolpis filiformis DC.
- Tolpis glabrescens Kämmer - Tenerife in Canary Islands
- Tolpis laciniata (Sch.Bip.) - Tenerife + Gomera + La Palma + Hierro in Canary Islands
- Tolpis lagopoda C.Sm. ex Link - Canary Islands
- Tolpis liouvillei Braun-Blanq. & Maire - Morocco
- Tolpis macrorhiza (Lowe) Lowe - Madeira
- Tolpis mbalensis G.V.Pope - Malawi, Zambia
- Tolpis nemoralis Font Quer - Spain, Morocco
- Tolpis proustii Pit. - Gomera + Hierro in Canary Islands
- Tolpis staticifolia (All.) Sch.Bip. - south-central Europe from Germany to Albania
- Tolpis succulenta Lowe - Azores, Madeira
- Tolpis umbellata Bertol. - Mediterranean from Azores to Palestine
- Tolpis virgata (Desf.) Bertol. - Mediterranean + Middle East from Corsica to Yemen
- Tolpis webbii Sch.Bip. - Gomera + Tenerife in Canary Islands
