= Tolpis farinulosa =

Conservation status
- Endangered (IUCN 3.1)

Scientific classification
- Kingdom: Plantae
- Clade: Tracheophytes
- Clade: Angiosperms
- Clade: Eudicots
- Clade: Asterids
- Order: Asterales
- Family: Asteraceae
- Genus: Tolpis
- Species: T. farinulosa

Binomial name
- Tolpis farinulosa (Webb) Walpole

Synonyms
- Schmidtia farinulosa Webb; Tolpis glandulifera Bolle

Species of flowering plant

Tolpis farinulosa is a species of flowering plants of the family Asteraceae. The species is endemic to Cape Verde. It is listed as endangered by the IUCN. Its local name is mato-branco ("white bush"), a name that may also refer to the species Phagnalon melanoleucum and Verbascum cystolithicum.

== Distribution ==
The species is found in the west of Cape Verde, in the islands of Santo Antão, São Vicente, Ilhéu Raso, São Nicolau, Santiago, Fogo and Brava. The plant is found between 800 and 1,800 m elevation. It grows in sub-humid and humid mountain areas.
