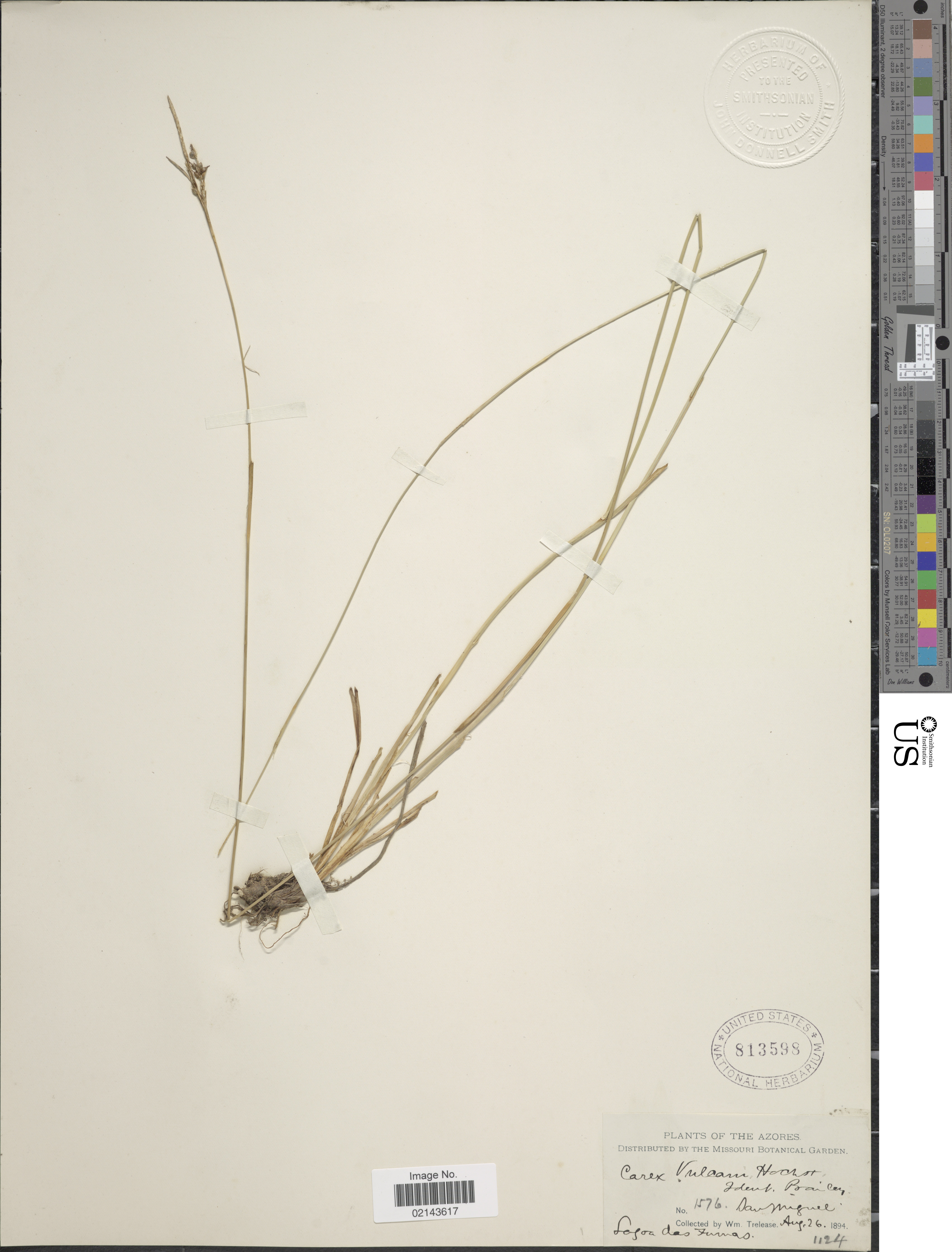

Scientific classification
- Kingdom: Plantae
- Clade: Tracheophytes
- Clade: Angiosperms
- Clade: Monocots
- Clade: Commelinids
- Order: Poales
- Family: Cyperaceae
- Genus: Carex
- Species: C. vulcani

Binomial name
- Carex vulcani Hochst. ex Seub.

Synonyms
- Carex floresiana Hochst. ex Seub.; Carex watsonii Boott

= Carex vulcani =

Species of sedge

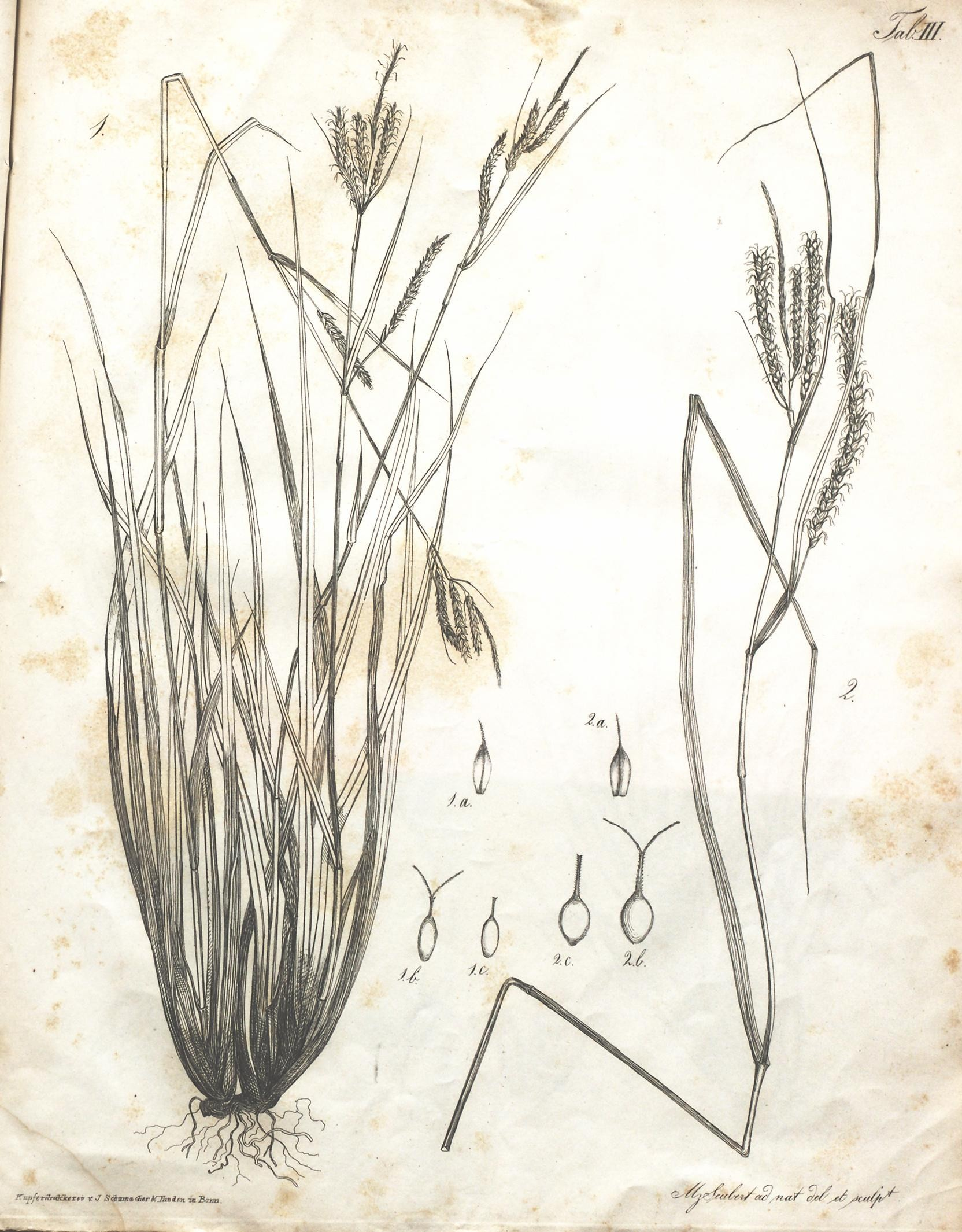
Botanical Illustration

Carex vulcani is a species of sedge native to the Azores generally found above 300 m (980 ft) altitude.
