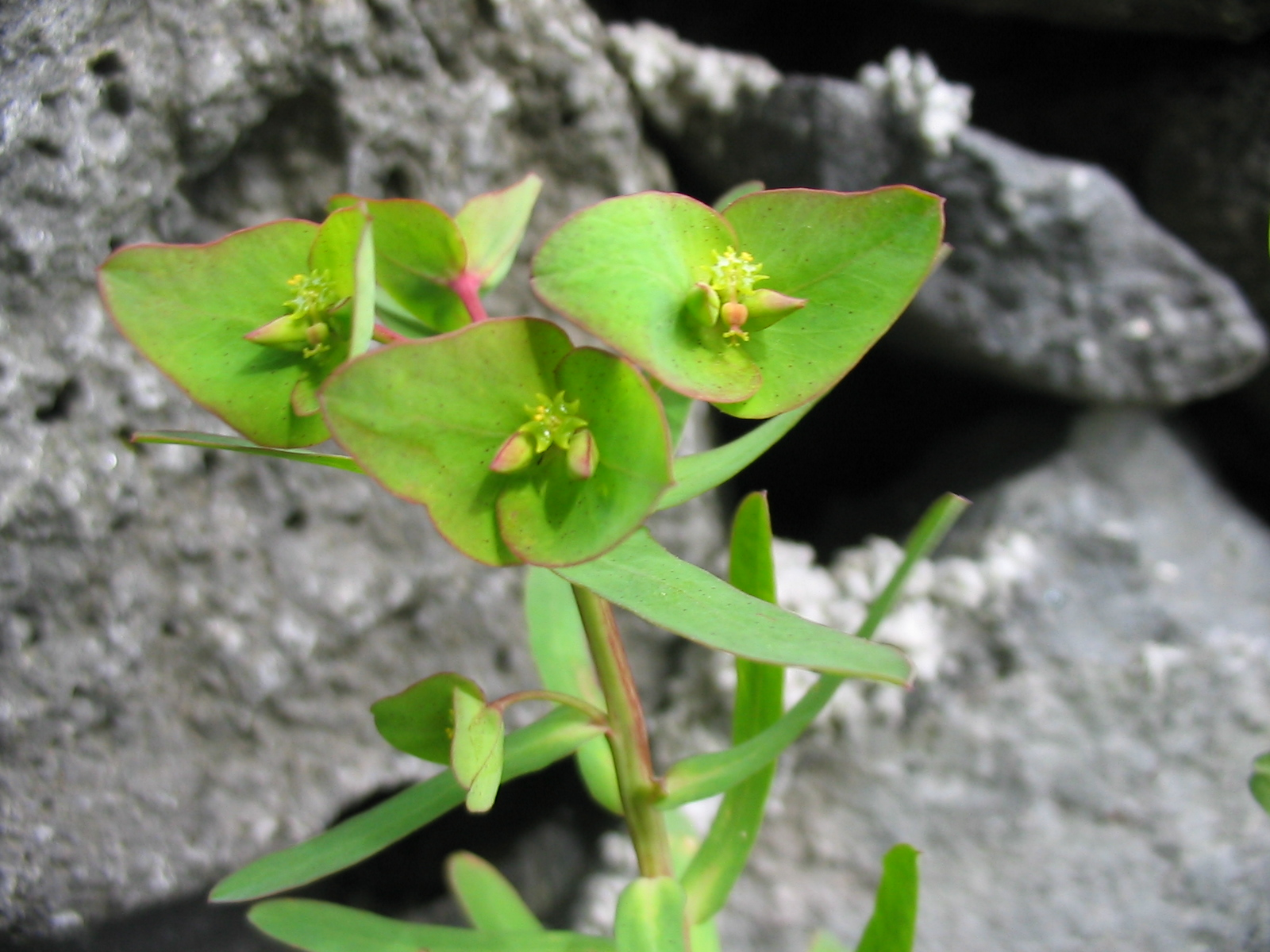

Scientific classification
- Kingdom: Plantae
- Clade: Tracheophytes
- Clade: Angiosperms
- Clade: Eudicots
- Clade: Rosids
- Order: Malpighiales
- Family: Euphorbiaceae
- Genus: Euphorbia
- Species: E. azorica

Binomial name
- Euphorbia azorica Hochst.

= Euphorbia azorica =

Species of flowering plant

Euphorbia azorica is a species of flowering plant in the spurge family Euphorbiaceae, endemic to the Azores, Portugal.

It is found in coastal rocks and sands and wastelands of the coast. It is present in all of the nine Azorean islands.

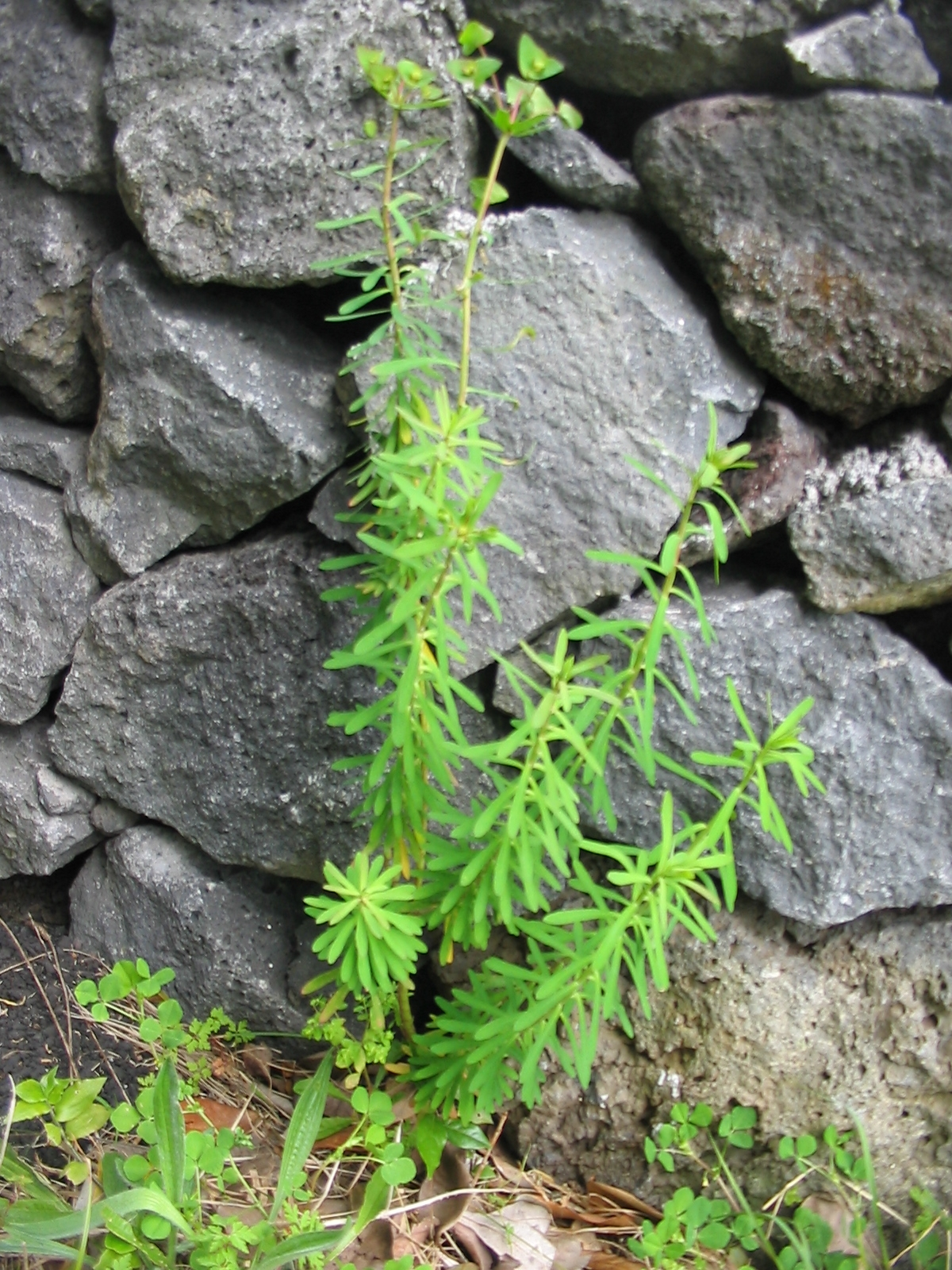
