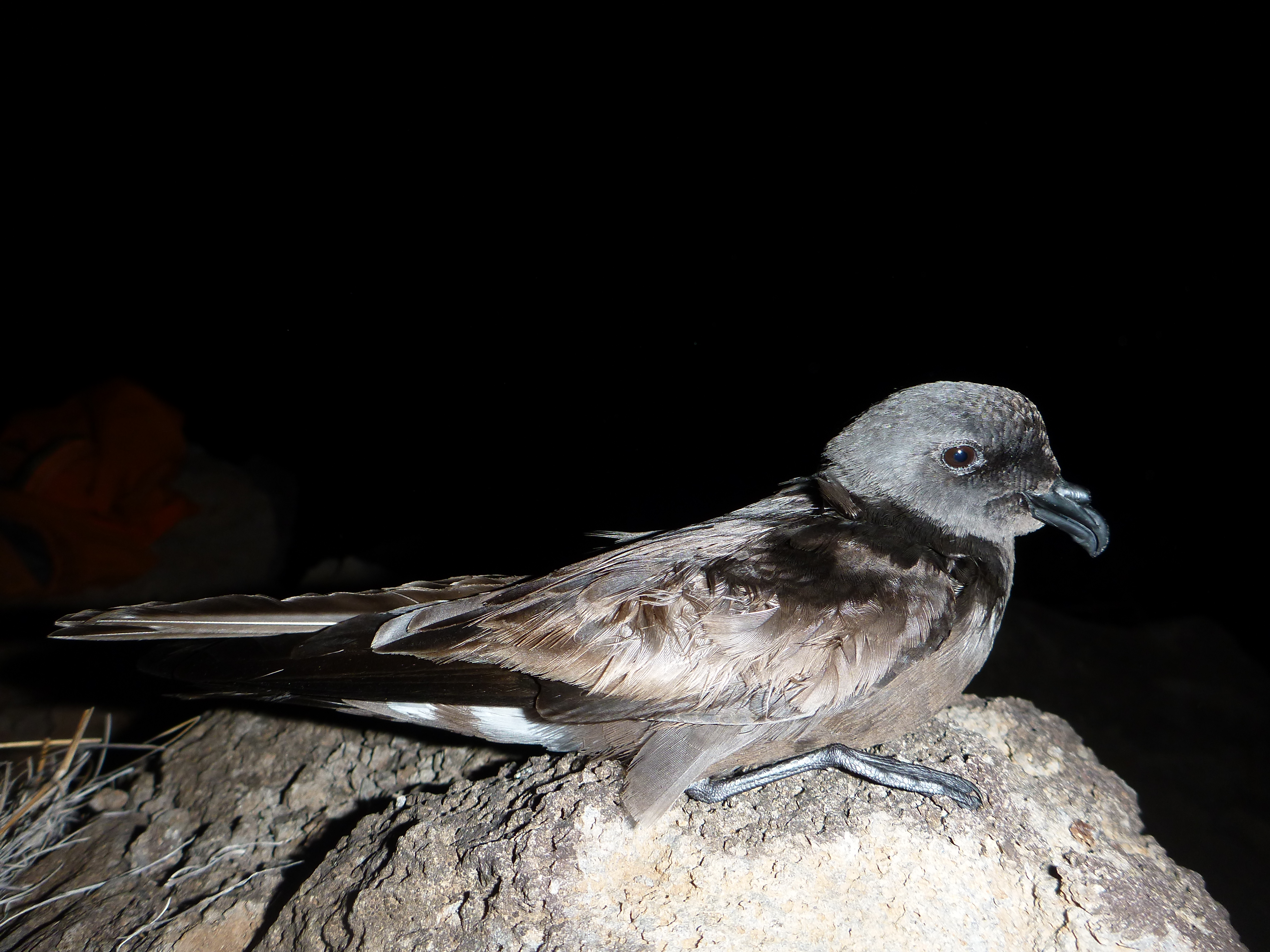

Conservation status
- Least Concern (IUCN 3.1)

Scientific classification
- Kingdom: Animalia
- Phylum: Chordata
- Class: Aves
- Order: Procellariiformes
- Family: Hydrobatidae
- Genus: Hydrobates
- Species: H. castro

Binomial name
- Hydrobates castro (Harcourt, 1851)
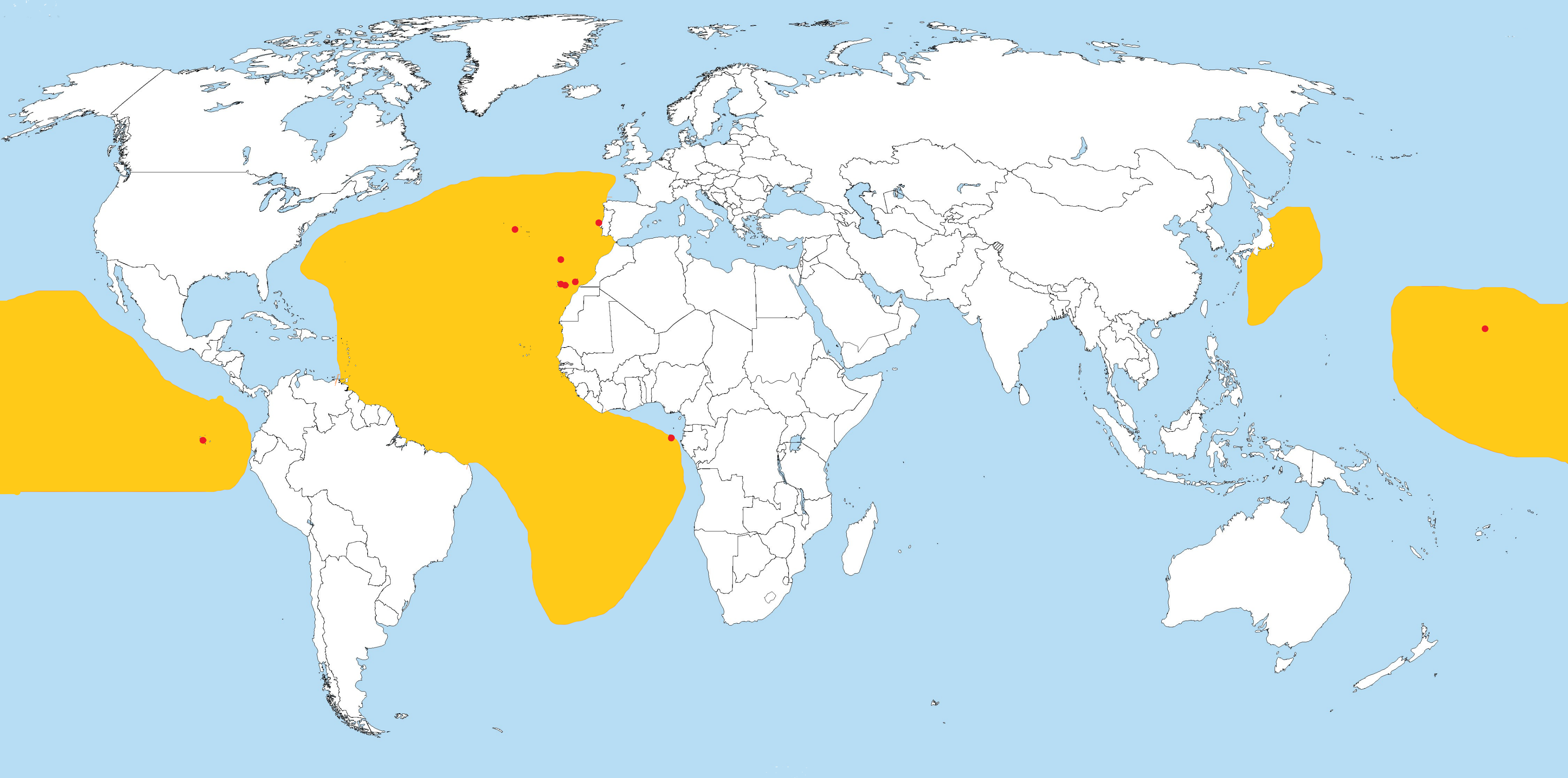

Synonyms
- Thalassidroma castro Harcourt, 1851; Cymochorea cryptoleucura Ridgway, 1882; Thalassidroma cryptoleuca Ogilvie-Grant, 1895 (emendation of the previous name); Oceanodroma castro bangsi Nichols, 1914

= Band-rumped storm petrel =

Species of bird

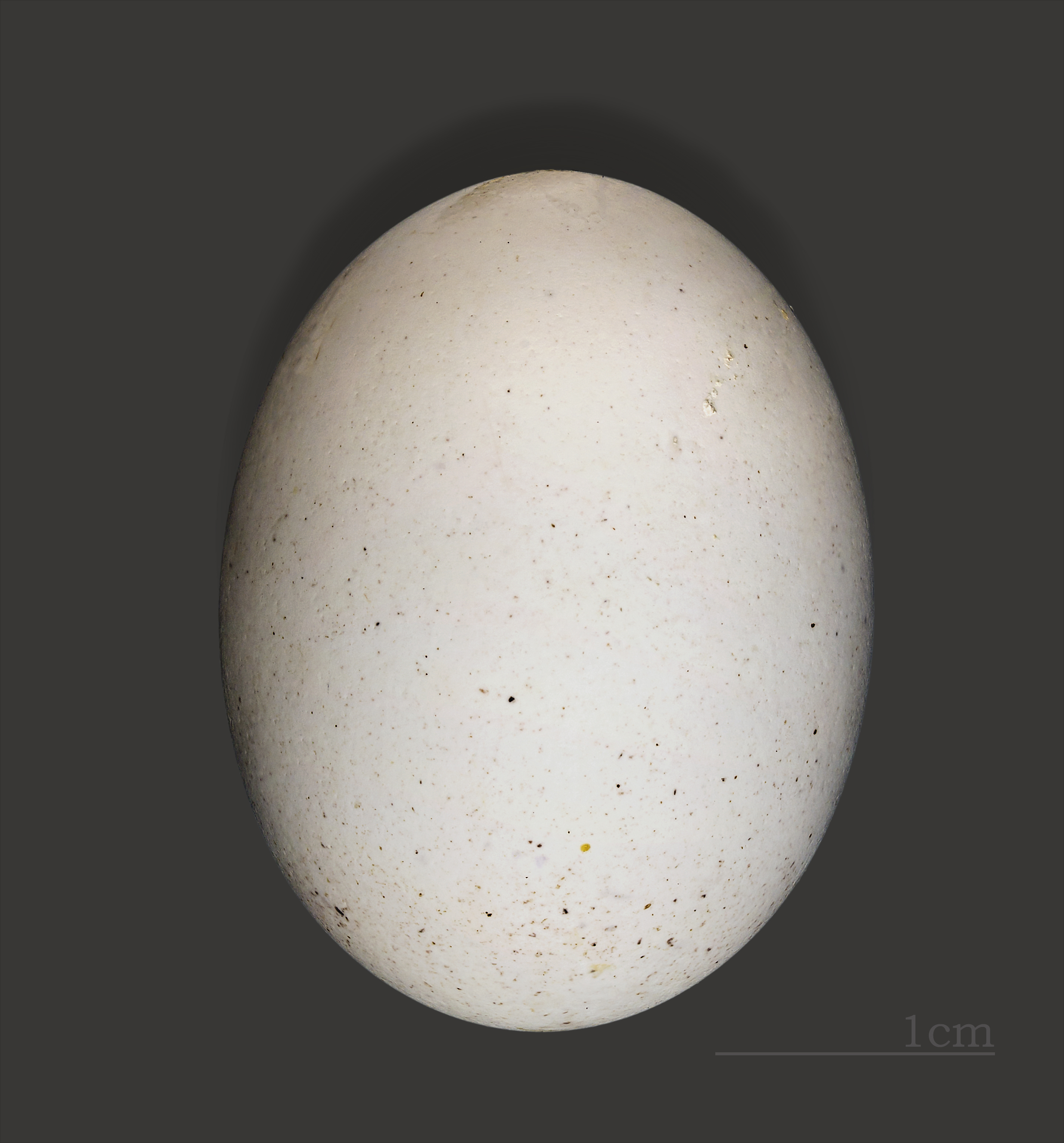
Egg (coll.MHNT)

The band-rumped storm petrel, Madeiran storm petrel, or Harcourt's storm petrel (Hydrobates castro) is a species of storm petrel in the family Hydrobatidae.

== Description ==
The band-rumped storm petrel is 19–21 cm (7.5–8.3 in) in length with a 43–46 cm (17–18 in) wingspan, and weighs 44–49 g (1.6–1.7 oz). It is mainly brownish black with an extensive white rump. Similar to Leach's storm petrel with the forked tail, long wings, but Leach's has a more deeply forked tail, a differently shaped (V-shaped or triangular) white rump, and a 'tern-like' flight, whereas the band-rumped storm-petrel has a more 'shearwater-like' flight.

== Distribution ==
The species breeds on islands in the warmer parts of the Atlantic and Pacific Oceans. These include the Berlengas (a few tens of kilometres off mainland Portugal), the Azores, Madeira, Canary Islands and Saint Helena in the Atlantic, and in the Pacific off eastern Japan, on Kauai, Hawaii, and on the Galápagos Islands. In 2016, the species was reported to have also started breeding on the Mauna Loa volcano on the island of Hawaii.

== Behaviour ==
=== Breeding ===
Birds nest in colonies close to the sea in rock crevices and females lay a single white egg per breeding attempt. The band-rumped storm petrel spends the non-breeding period at sea. It is strictly nocturnal at its breeding sites to avoid predation by gulls and diurnal raptors such as peregrines, and will even avoid coming to land on clear moonlit nights. Like most petrels, its walking ability is limited to a short shuffle from/to the burrow.

=== Feeding ===
Individuals feed by picking up prey items (invertebrates, small vertebrates and sometimes carrion) from the water surface. A study aiming to determine the diving abilities of this species was actually conducted on the 'warm season' population from the Azores, which was later recognized as a distinct species (see below).

== Taxonomy ==
Recent discoveries of 'cold season' and 'warm season' populations, which use the same nest sites at different times of year, and also differ in terms of vocalisations and moulting period, may hint at the existence of two 'cryptic species' within the currently understood limits of the species. After population genetics analyses of mtDNA, the warm season population in the Azores was recognized as a separate species, Monteiro's storm petrel.

It was formerly defined in the genus Oceanodroma before that genus was synonymized with Hydrobates. It is monotypic, but the names cryptoleucura and bangsi (see above synonyms) were each formerly regarded as separate subspecies.
