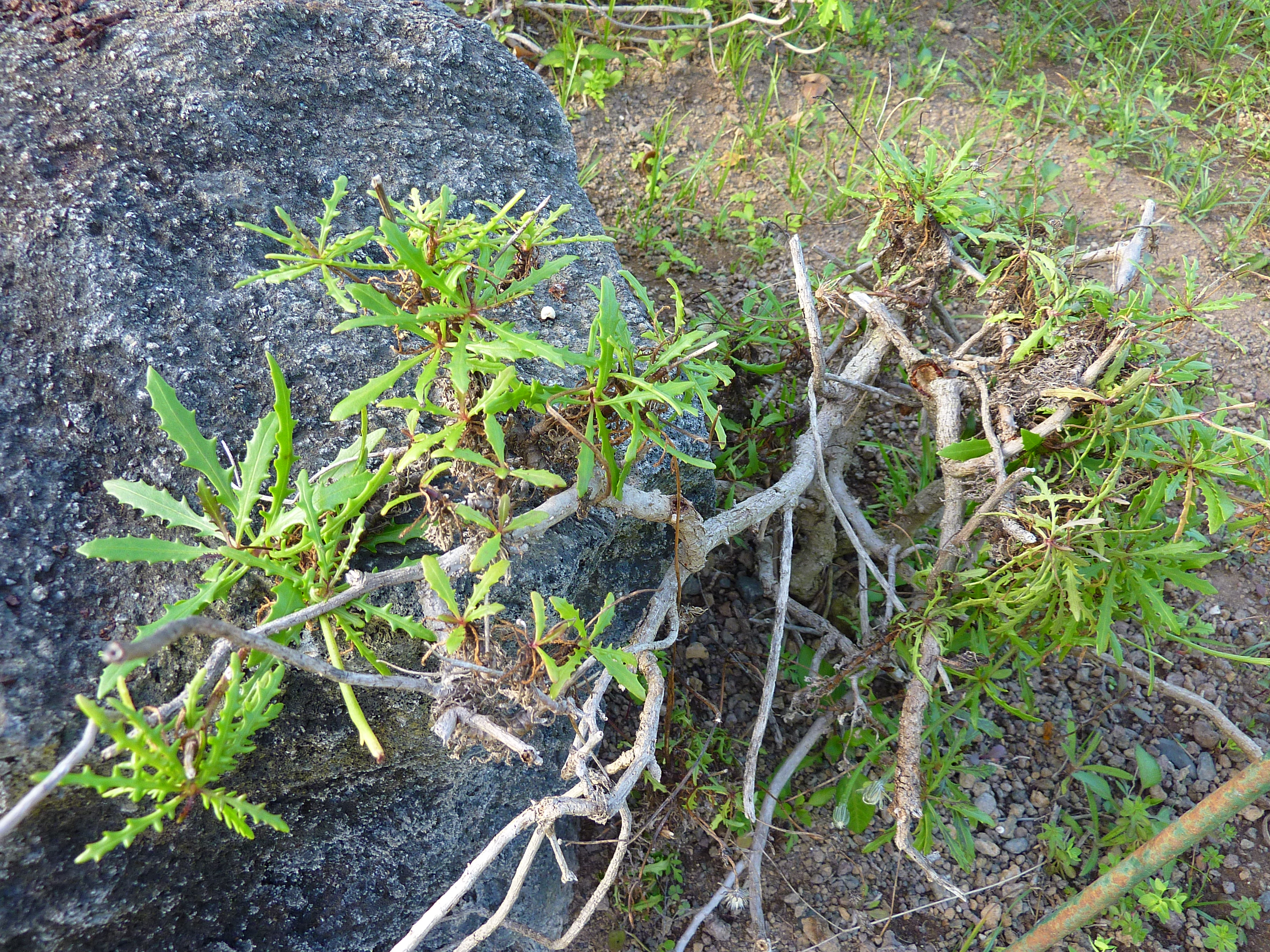

Scientific classification
- Kingdom: Plantae
- Clade: Tracheophytes
- Clade: Angiosperms
- Clade: Eudicots
- Clade: Asterids
- Order: Asterales
- Family: Asteraceae
- Genus: Tolpis
- Species: T. succulenta

Binomial name
- Tolpis succulenta (Dryand. ex Aiton) Lowe

Synonyms
- Aethonia fruticosa (Moench) D. Don; Crepis succulenta Dryand. ex Aiton; Hieracium fruticosum (Moench) Willd.; Schmidtia anethifolia Rchb.; Schmidtia fruticosa Moench; Tolpis fruticosa (Moench) Schrank; Tolpis pectinata (Lowe) DC.; Crepis pectinata Lowe; Crepis tenuifolia Sol. & Banks ex Lowe

= Tolpis succulenta =

Species of plant

Tolpis succulenta is a species of flowering plant in the family Asteraceae native to the Portuguese archipelagos of the Azores and Madeira. It inhabits all islands (excluding the Savage Islands).

== Description ==
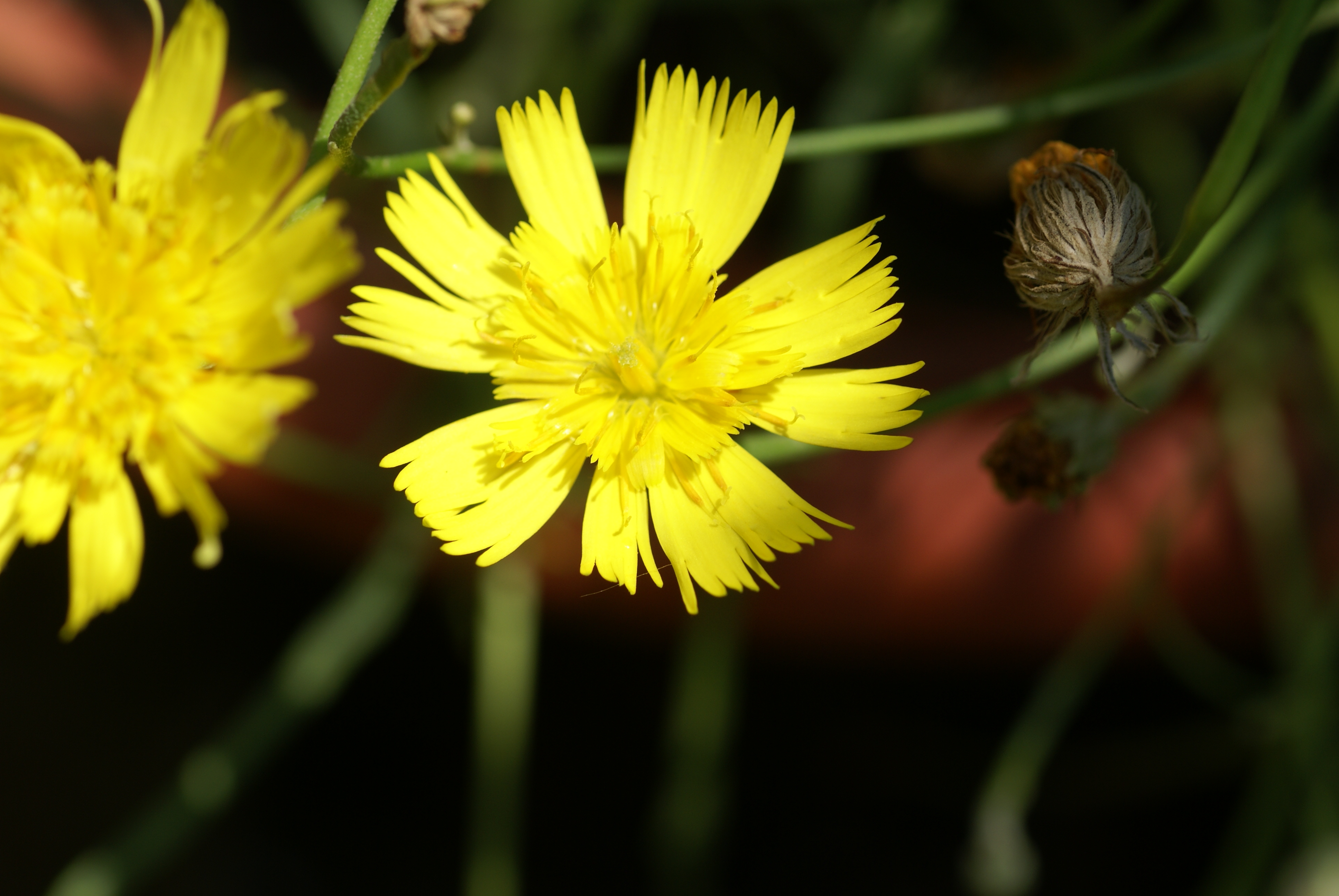
Inflorescence

Tolpis succulenta is a perennial plant and can reach more than 40 cm (16 in) in length. Older individuals present a woody base. Its leaves are glabrous and toothed. It has yellow flowers scattered along the stems.
