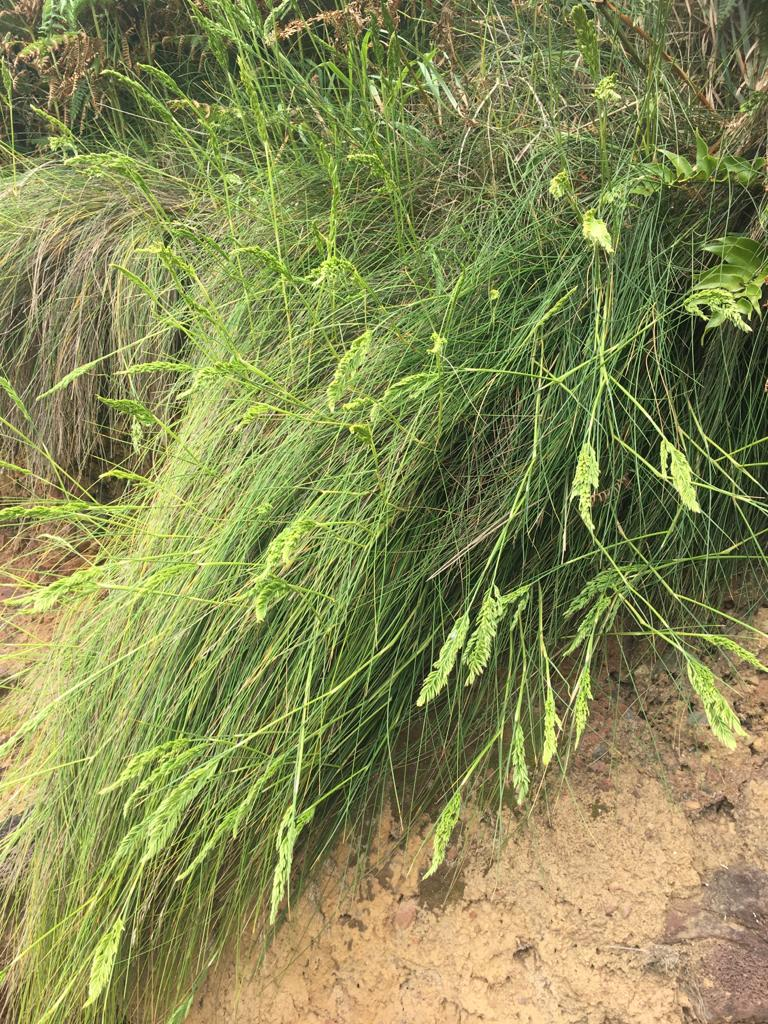
- Festuca petraea on Serreta, Terceira

Scientific classification
- Kingdom: Plantae
- Clade: Embryophytes
- Clade: Tracheophytes
- Clade: Spermatophytes
- Clade: Angiosperms
- Clade: Monocots
- Clade: Commelinids
- Order: Poales
- Family: Poaceae
- Subfamily: Pooideae
- Genus: Festuca
- Species: F. petraea

Binomial name
- Festuca petraea Seub.

= Festuca petraea =

Species of grass

Festuca petraea is a species of grass endemic to the Azores, Portugal. It is found in coastal cliffs and rocks. It is present in all of the nine islands.

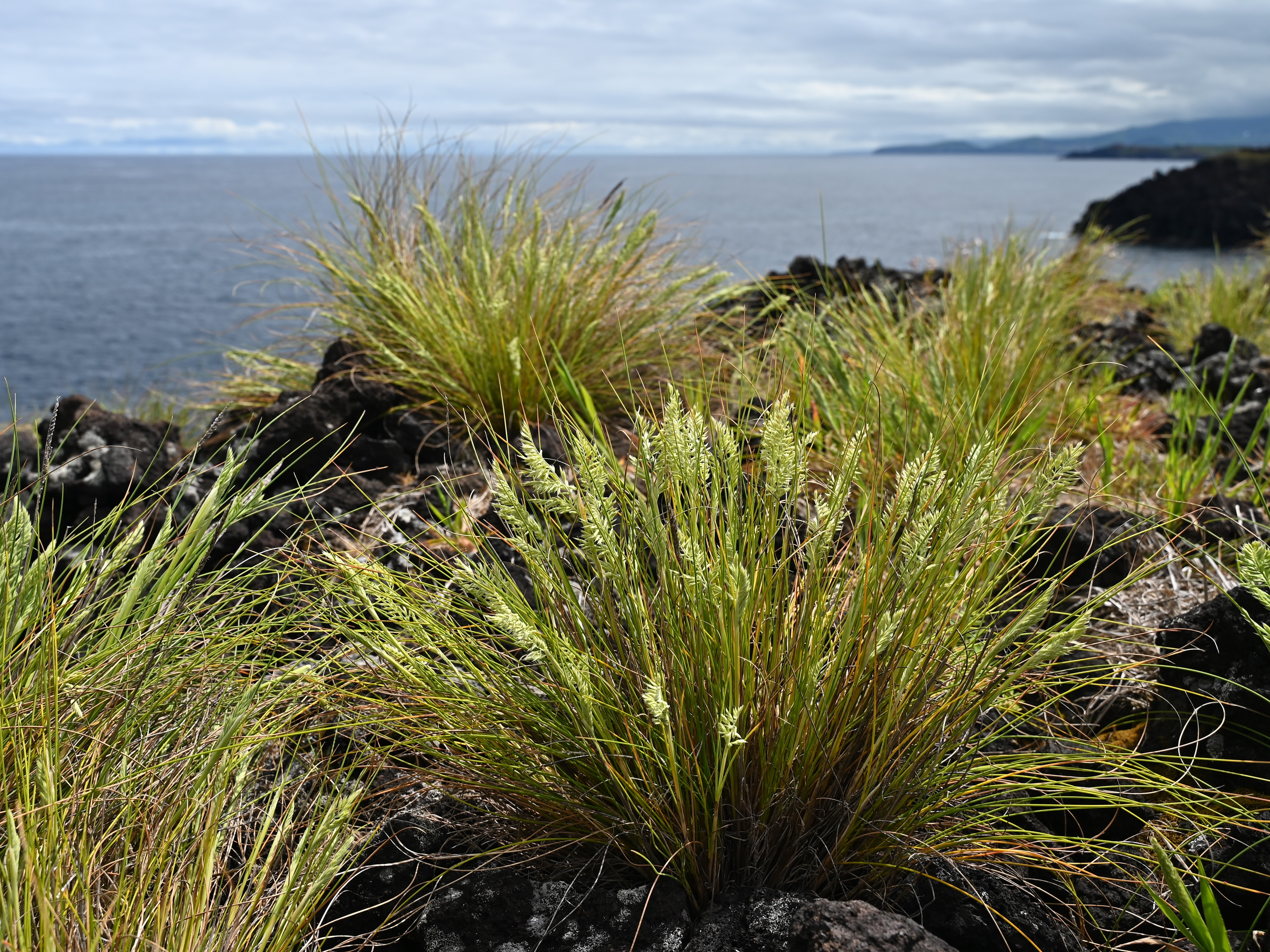
The shape of the grass

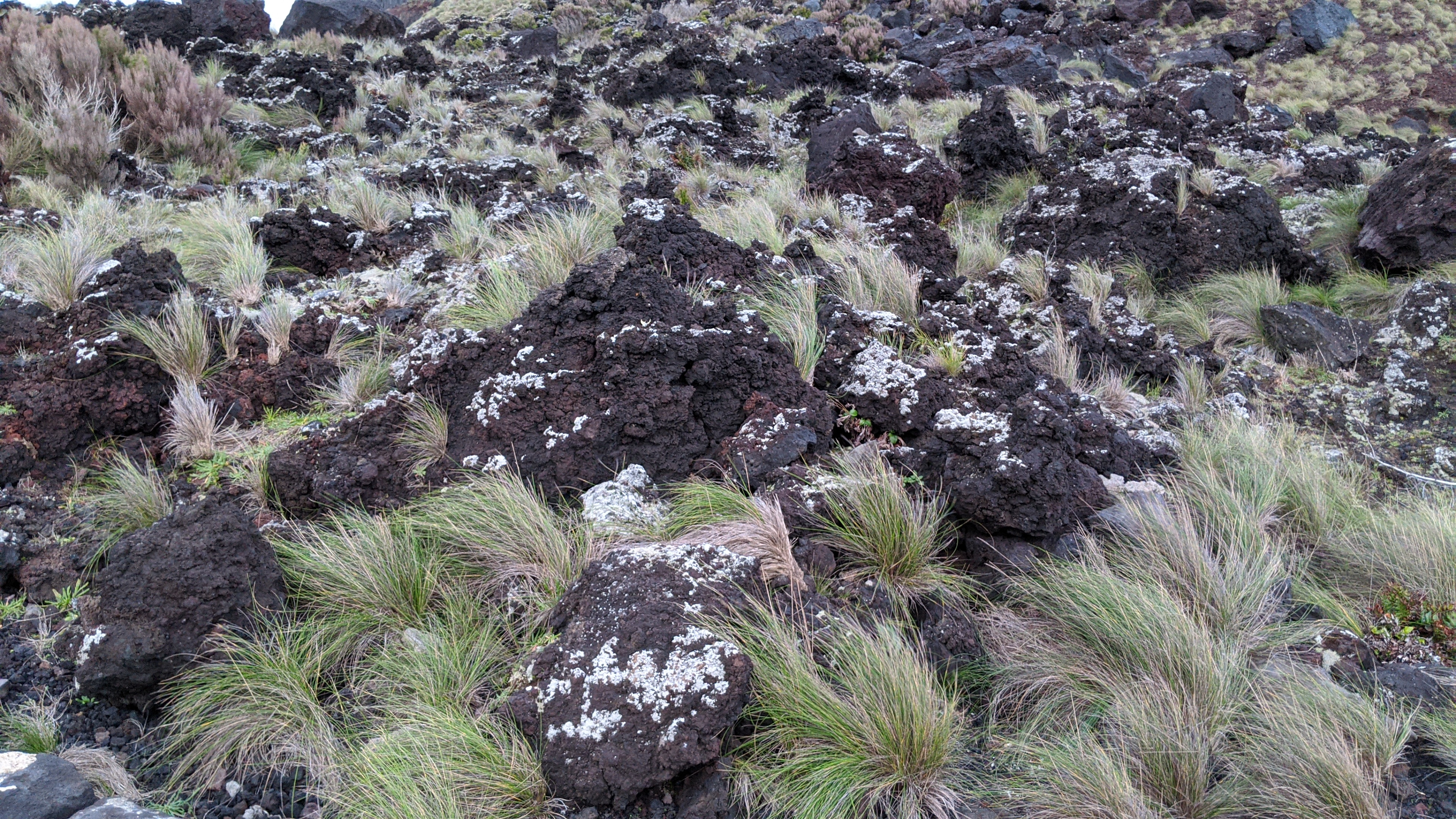
Can grow in rocky ground
