= Monchique Islet =

Island in the Azores, Portugal

Native name: Ilhéu de Monchique
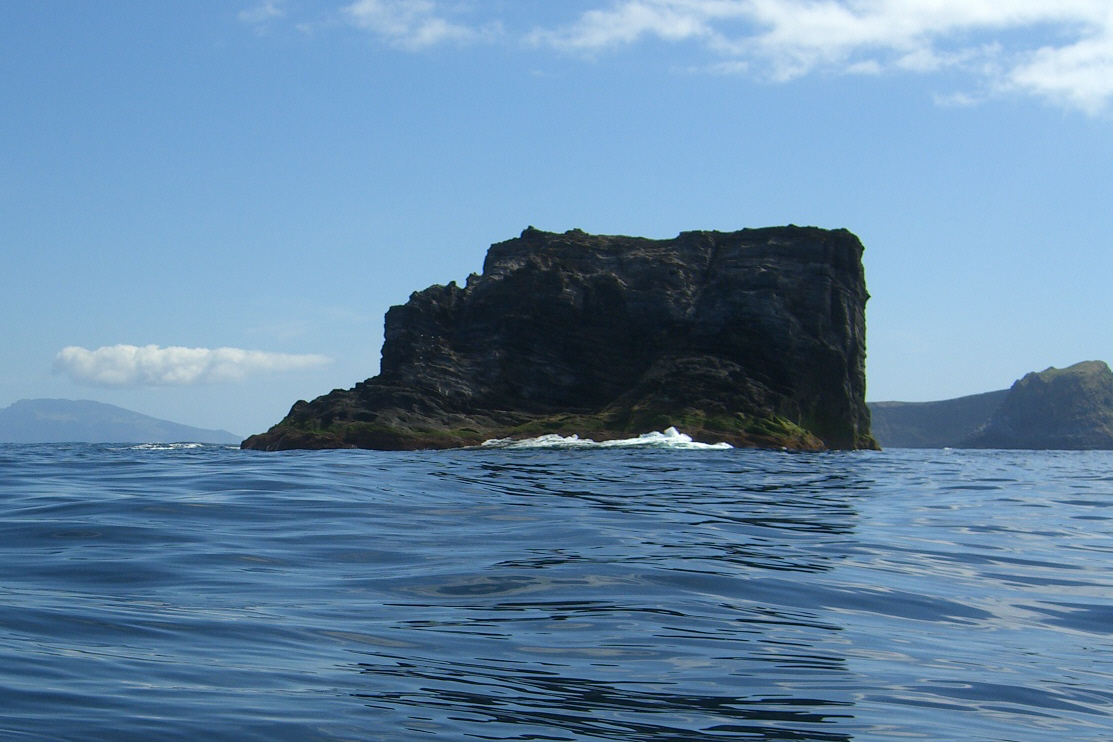
- The waters around Monchique, showing the vertical prominence of the islet

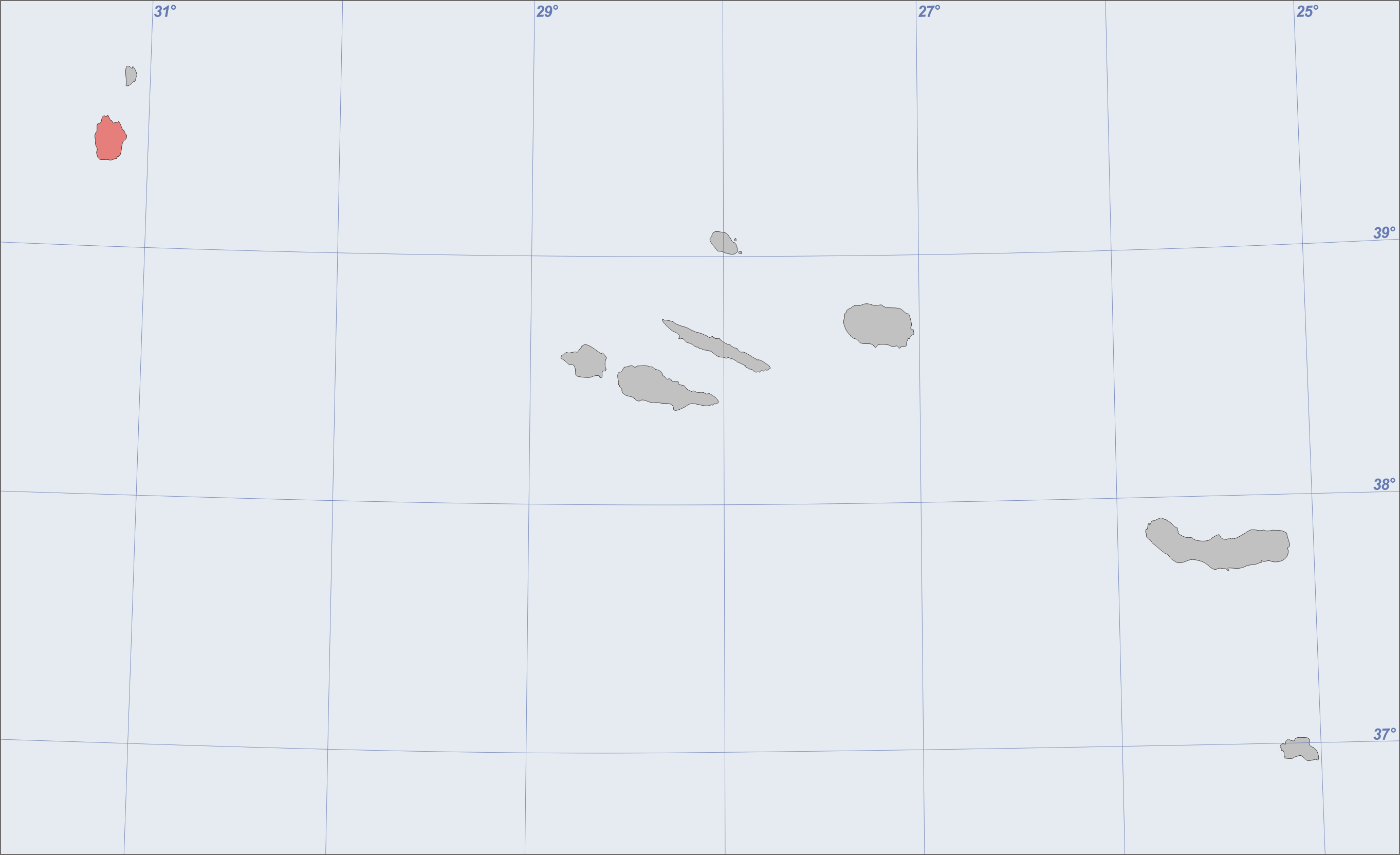
- Location of the island of Flores in the archipelago of the Azores

Geography
- Location: Atlantic Ocean
- Coordinates: 39°29′42.8″N 31°16′30″W

Administration
- Portugal
- Autonomous region: Azores

Monchique Islet (Portuguese: Ilhéu de Monchique, Portuguese pronunciation: [iˈʎɛw ðɨ mũˈʃikɨ]) is a small uninhabited islet off the coast of the island of Flores, west of the village of Fajã Grande, in the western part of the Portuguese archipelago of the Azores. It is the westernmost point of Portugal and, if considered part of Europe (although it sits on the North American Plate), is Europe's westernmost point as well.

Approachable only by boat, the 43-metre (141 ft) deep bay provides opportunities for scuba diving during the day in the summer. The islet and the waters around it are protected for their rich biodiversity. Ninety-six species of flora and fauna have been identified congregating in the waters near the islet, including brown algae, limpets, barnacles, and Mediterranean rainbow wrasse.

== History ==
Historically, the islet functioned as an astronomical or celestial navigational guide and reference mark for mariners, who calibrated their navigational equipment by referencing the islet on long Atlantic crossings. Its unique geological formation also attracted visitors traveling between Europe and America, intersecting here on their way to the ports of Lajes or Santa Cruz on Flores Island. The steep rock slopes of the islet's shoreline served as shelter from strong gales.

The islet gave its name to the defunct monthly newspaper O Monchique, the last regularly-published newspaper on Flores.

== Geography ==
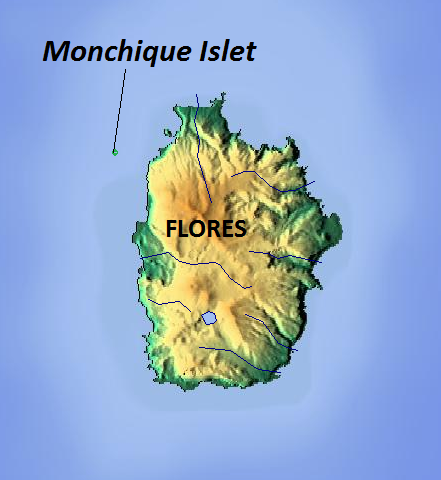
Location map of the islet of Monchique near the island of Flores

The islet is located more than 1.6 kilometres (1.0 mi) north-northwest of the island of Flores, in a bay between Ponta de Fenais (Point Fanaes or Fanais Port) and Fajã Grande. The islet is located on the North American Plate between the two westernmost Azorean islands of Flores and Corvo.

The islet is a solid monolith of black basaltic rock consisting of a vertical wall formation, remnants of a coastal volcanic cone eroded by ocean forces. It extends steeply to a height of 34 metres (112 ft) above sea level. It was formed from irregular lava flows that produced many submarine cavities along the islet's relief, with sand and boulders accumulating around the shoreline over time. The islet is an elevated area that includes two rock outcroppings above the water's surface.

A deep channel separates Monchique Islet from Flores, with only a rock shoal called the Baixa Raza separating it from the Flores shoreline. Since the channel is between 45 metres (148 ft) and 55 metres (180 ft) deep, ships are able to anchor in the bay, aiding visits to the area and providing shelter from storms. The deep channel is considered safe for navigation, though ships must navigate with care to avoid surface rocks. The Baixa Raza rock formation extends over a length of 0.64 kilometres (0.40 mi) to the west of Ponta de Fenais.

=== Biome ===
The maximum depth of water in the coastal channel is 40 metres (130 ft), with water temperatures varying between 17–23 °C (63–73 °F). The islet is the centre of a region of great biodiversity, with 96 identified species, with a Margalef index of 11.0 biodiversity. The flora along its flanks are dominated by an iridescent brown algae (Dictyota dichotoma), while numerous fauna species including limpets (Patella ulyssiponensis and Patella aspera), barnacles (Megabalanus azoricus and Megabalanus tintinnabulum), and Mediterranean rainbow wrasse (Coris julis) are found in the inner straits.

Measures to conserve the islet and its waters fall under the Plano do Ordenamento da Orla Costeira (POOC) Flores (English: Organizing the Flores Coastline Plan), which identifies the islet as part of an area of conservation and preservation for ecological and tourism reasons. The islet itself is identified as "vulnerable" and designated areas have been marked for terrestrial and marine species protection, limiting human use and access to the islet and surrounding waters.

== Recreation ==
Visits to Monchique Islet are considered ideal in late spring or early summer (June and July) when the weather is good and vegetation is green and flowers bloom. The airport nearest the islet is Flores Airport in Santa Cruz das Flores. Locally, the islet is only accessible by boat.

The water around the coast is suitable for scuba diving as the underwater visibility is good in the warm, clear, and clean waters. There is an advisory which states diving in these waters should be done only during daylight hours as a precautionary measure to avoid any surprises from sea currents. Kayakers can travel to Monchique Islet from Flores.
