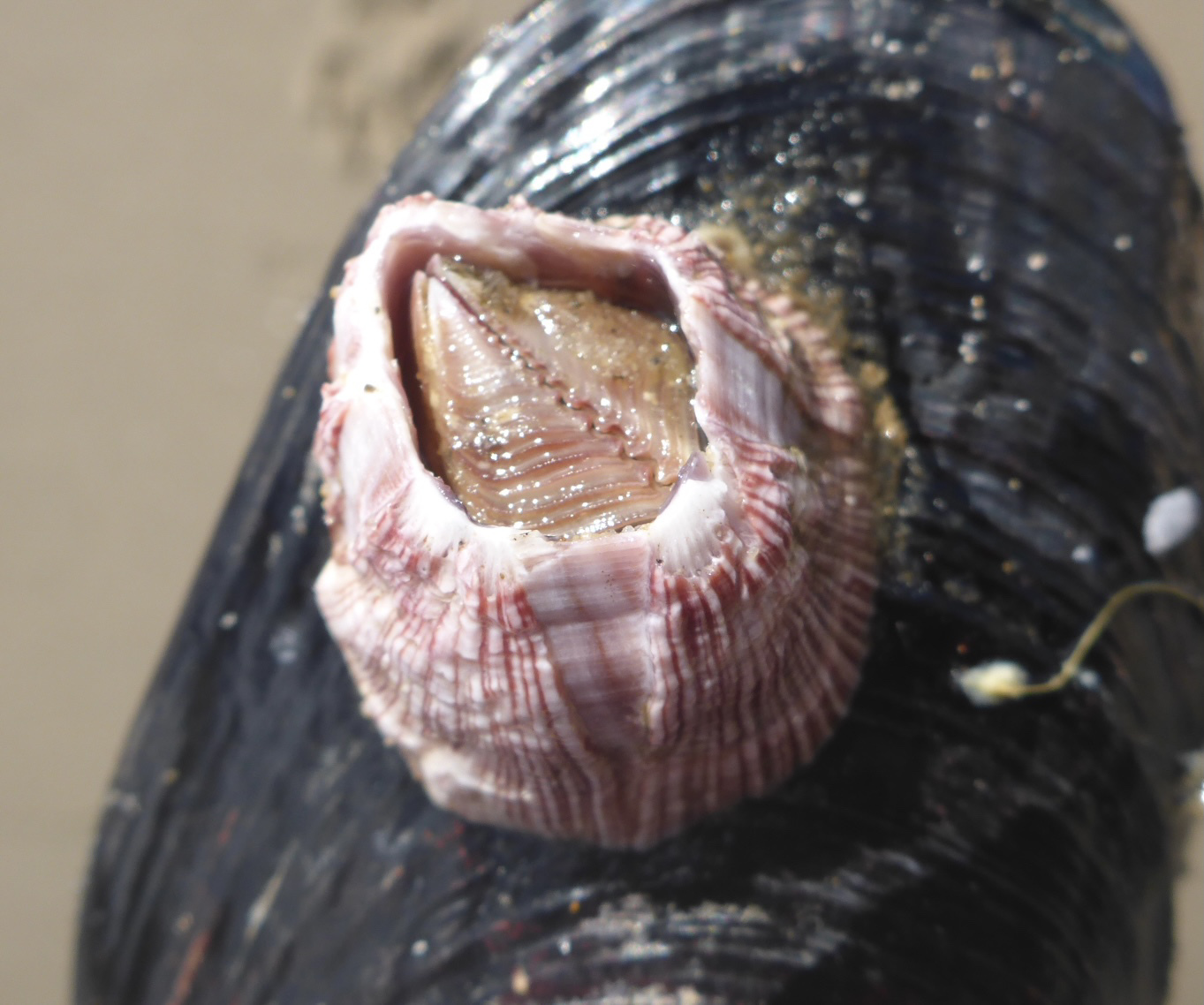

Scientific classification
- Kingdom: Animalia
- Phylum: Arthropoda
- Clade: Pancrustacea
- Class: Thecostraca
- Subclass: Cirripedia
- Order: Balanomorpha
- Family: Balanidae
- Genus: Megabalanus
- Species: M. californicus

Binomial name
- Megabalanus californicus (Pilsbry, 1916)

= Megabalanus californicus =

Species of barnacle

Megabalanus californicus, the California barnacle, is a species of large barnacle in the family Balanidae. It is native to rocky coasts in the Eastern Pacific Ocean from North California to the Gulf of California.

== Description ==
Megabalanus californicus is a large acorn barnacle with a diameter of up to 30 mm (1.2 in). The steep-sided shell is formed of six plates finely striped vertically with reddish-purple and white. There are relatively wide, reddish radii between the plates where they fuse. The mantle, visible through the wide aperture, is margined with red, orange, yellow and blue. This barnacle could be confused with Megabalanus coccopoma, but that species is paler, has a smaller aperture and narrower radii between the plates.

== Distribution and habitat ==
Megabalanus californicus occurs in the Eastern Pacific Ocean in the subtidal and intertidal zones of rocky shores. Its range extends from northern California southwards to the Gulf of California. It usually grows in groups and is most common on pilings and buoys. In a year following an El Niño event, it is often found to have increased its distribution northwards.

== Biology ==
In common with related species, Megabalanus californicus is a hermaphrodite and broadcast spawner. The eggs are retained in the mantle cavity where they are fertilised, the developing nauplii larvae becoming planktonic. After six stages these develop into zoea larvae which settle on the seabed, cement themselves to the substrate and undergo metamorphosis into juveniles.
