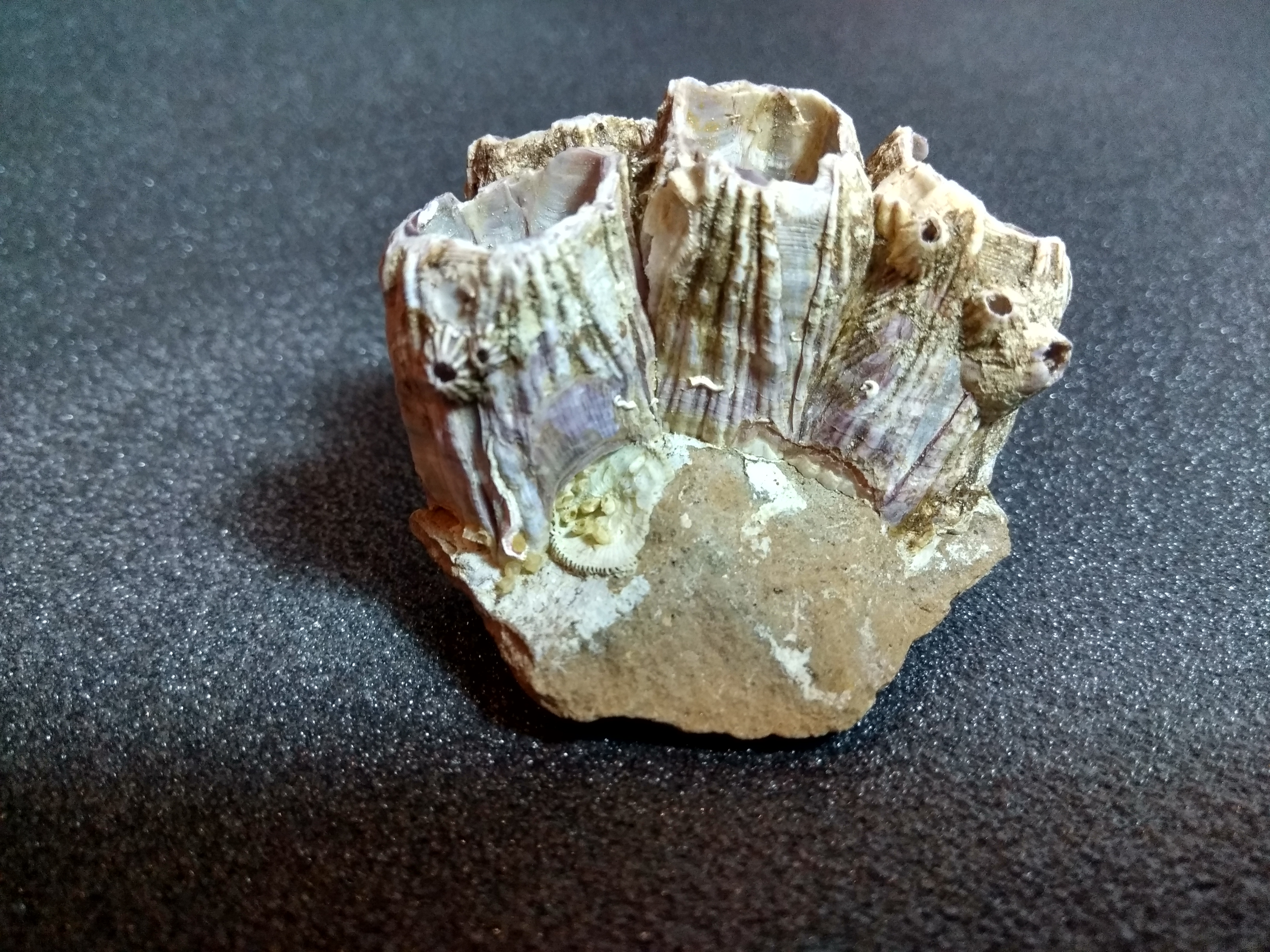

Scientific classification
- Kingdom: Animalia
- Phylum: Arthropoda
- Class: Thecostraca
- Subclass: Cirripedia
- Order: Balanomorpha
- Family: Balanidae
- Genus: Megabalanus
- Species: M. azoricus

Binomial name
- Megabalanus azoricus (Pilsbry, 1916)

Synonyms
- Balanus (Megabalanus) tintinnabulum subsp. azoricus Pilsbry, 1916

= Megabalanus azoricus =

Species of barnacle

Megabalanus azoricus, the Azorean barnacle, is a species of large barnacle in the family Balanidae. It is endemic to Macaronesia: the Azores, Madeira, the Canary Islands, and Cape Verde. It is the largest and third most common shallow water barnacle of the Azores, where it is heavily exploited for food and has a high commercial value since the colonization of the islands. It was included in the 100 species for priority management within Macaronesia. It is a thoracopodal filter feeder and the majority are hermaphrodites. It is more abundant in the first 3 m (9.8 ft) on the low intertidal and infralittoral rocky shores. The empty shells of the barnacles are a vital habitat for the blennies Parablennius ruber, P. incognitus and Coryphoblennius galerita as they provide shelter and substrata for egg deposition during reproduction. A large number of invertebrate species also use the empty shells. Although present throughout the archipelago, it is more abundant in the eastern islands. It has a genetic similarity with Megabalanus tintinnabulum. Some crucial features of the M. azoricus species are digonic hermaphroditism in sessile adults, development of planktotrophic larvae, dependence on exposed rocky shores in the intertidal habitat, and insular distribution restricted to the northeastern Atlantic oceanic islands.
