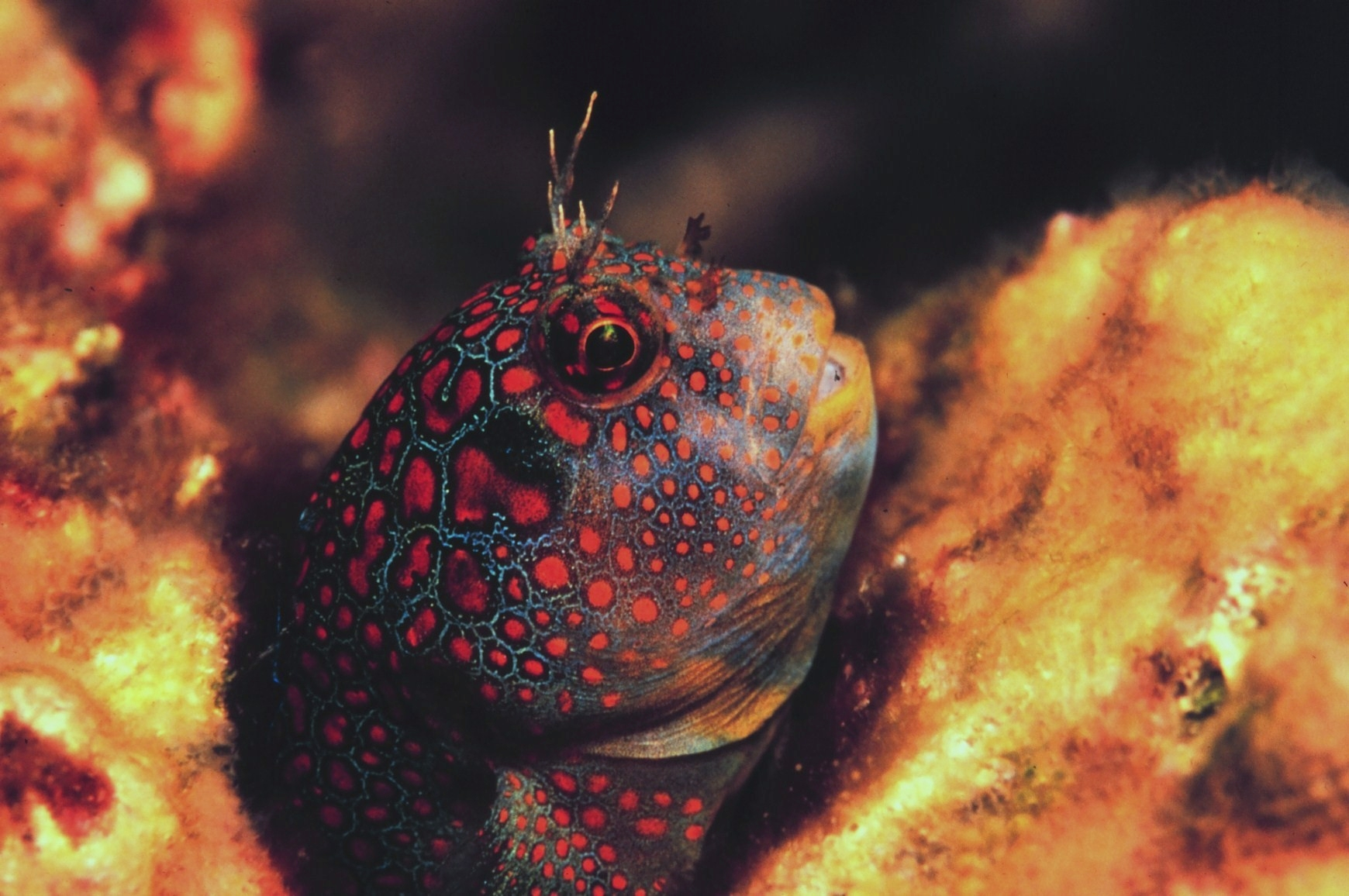

Conservation status
- Least Concern (IUCN 3.1)

Scientific classification
- Kingdom: Animalia
- Phylum: Chordata
- Class: Actinopterygii
- Order: Blenniiformes
- Family: Blenniidae
- Genus: Hypsoblennius
- Species: H. invemar

Binomial name
- Hypsoblennius invemar Smith-Vaniz & Acero P., 1980

= Hypsoblennius invemar =

Species of fish

Hypsoblennius invemar, commonly known as the tessellated blenny, is a species of combtooth blenny found in the western Atlantic Ocean.

== Description ==
The tessellated blenny can reach a maximum length of 5.8 centimetres (2.3 in) TL. The head and front half of the body are bright blue covered with small brick red spots each rimmed in black. On the top of the head the spots often merge to give a net-like pattern. There is a black spot on the head just behind the eye. The dorsal fin has 12 spines and 12 soft rays. The anal fin has 2 spines and 15 soft rays. This fish can be confused with Springer's blenny (Scartella springeri) but that species lacks a black rim to the orange spots that cover its body.

== Distribution ==
The tessellated blenny is found in shallow waters off the coasts of Brazil, Colombia, Venezuela and the Lesser Antilles. Since about 1979, it has also appeared sporadically off the coasts of Texas, Alabama and Florida in the United States. It is seldom found below about 4.5 metres (15 ft) but occasionally occurs down to 18 metres (59 ft). It has become common round the legs of oil platforms in the Gulf of Mexico. It has probably been brought to the region while inside barnacle shells that were fouling the legs of rigs towed there from South America or in barnacles on the hulls of ships.

== Biology ==
The tessellated blenny lives inside an empty shell of the large barnacle, Megabalanus tintinnabulum. It is dioecious and the male and female form a pair bond. Fertilisation is external and the male broods a clump of eggs inside the barnacle shell. There is also an association with the hydroid Thyroscyphus marginatus, this species preferring areas where the hydroid is abundant.

== Etymology ==
The specific name is an acronym, standing for the Instituto de Investigaciones Marinas de Punta de Betin in Santa Marta, Colombia, which holds some of the paratypes.
