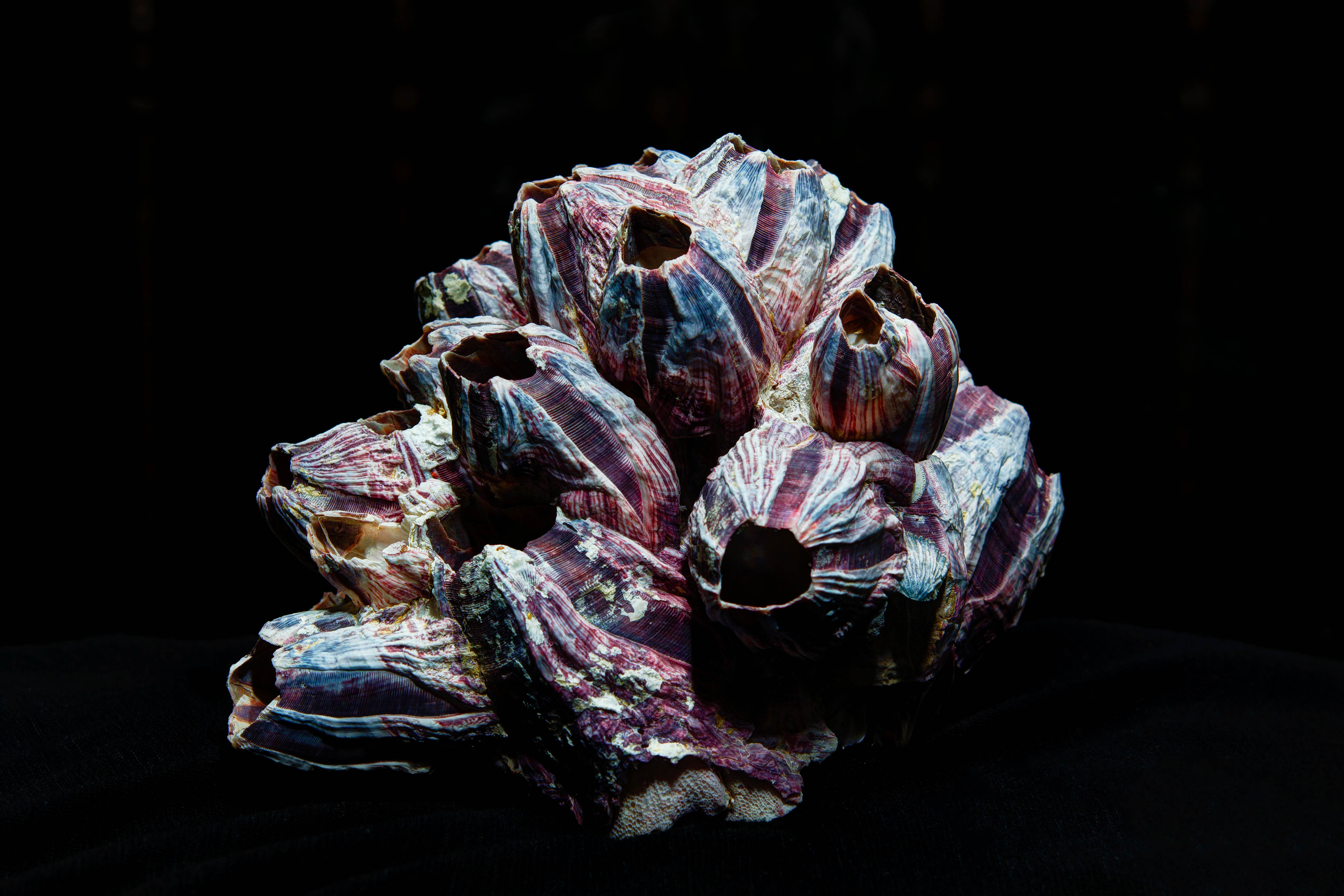

Scientific classification
- Domain: Eukaryota
- Kingdom: Animalia
- Phylum: Arthropoda
- Class: Thecostraca
- Subclass: Cirripedia
- Order: Balanomorpha
- Family: Balanidae
- Genus: Megabalanus
- Species: M. coccopoma

Binomial name
- Megabalanus coccopoma (Darwin, 1854)

= Megabalanus coccopoma =

Megabalanus coccopoma Temporal range: Oligocene–Recent

Species of barnacle

Megabalanus coccopoma, the titan acorn barnacle, is a tropical species of barnacle first described by Charles Darwin in 1854. Its native range is the Pacific coasts of South and Central America but it is extending its range to other parts of the world.

== Description ==
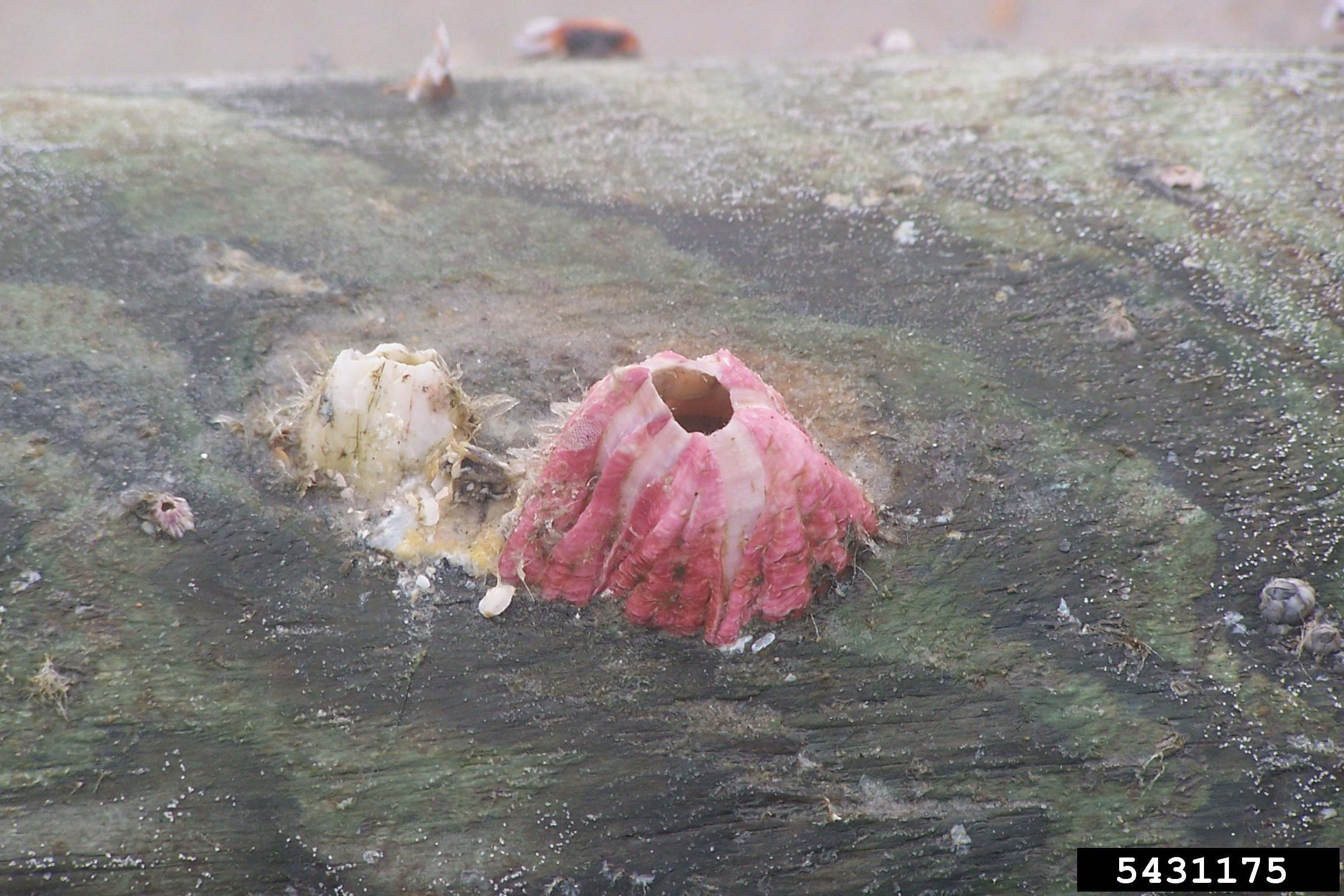

The titan acorn barnacle is a large species with calcareous plates forming a steep-sided cone which grows to a height and width of 5 centimetres (2.0 in). The plates are smooth and are fused together. They are pink and are separated by narrow purple or white radii and the aperture at the top is small. In the Pacific Ocean this species can be confused with Megabalanus californicus but that species is a darker colour, has a wider aperture and has wider rays between the plates.

== Distribution ==
The native range of the titan acorn barnacle is the Pacific coasts of Central and South America from Mazatlán, Mexico to the Ecuador/Peru border. It is found growing on rocks and other hard substrates from the low tide mark down to about 100 metres (330 ft). Fossil specimens of this barnacle have been found in rocks dating back to the Oligocene and it occurred in Baja California in the Pliocene at a time when that area was 480 kilometres (300 mi) further south.

== Range extension ==
It has expanded its range, probably as part of the fouling community on the hulls of ships, and appeared in Belgian waters in 1997. It is now also present on the coast of the United States from North Carolina southwards to Florida and in the Gulf of Mexico. It was first seen in Louisiana in 2002 and in Florida, Georgia, South and North Carolina in 2006. It may be extending its range northwards on this coast because higher surface water temperatures allow it to live and reproduce there. It suffered a setback in these areas in the cold winter of 2009–10. It appeared at San Diego in 1985 following an El Niño event in 1982–3 when sea surface temperatures were up to 4 °C (7 °F) above the average. To reach San Diego it is likely to have previously settled in one or more intermediate locations because San Diego is too far from its known range for the larvae to have drifted there in one season. In 2010, it was for the first time recorded in South Africa, on a buoy near the entrance to the Port of Durban; it is likely that the species is already present at other sites on that coast.

== Biology ==
The titan acorn barnacle is a suspension feeder, extending its cirri (modified legs) from the aperture at the top of the shell to catch plankton. As with other barnacles, sexual reproduction involves the passing of sperm along a long slender tube into the mantle cavity of a neighbouring barnacle. Fertilisation is internal and the larvae are planktonic. After passing through several stages over the course of about three weeks, they settle and undergo metamorphosis. They are gregarious and tend to settle near others of their species on rocks, on new man made structures such as cables, buoys and the hulls of boats, and also on the shells of bivalve molluscs.
