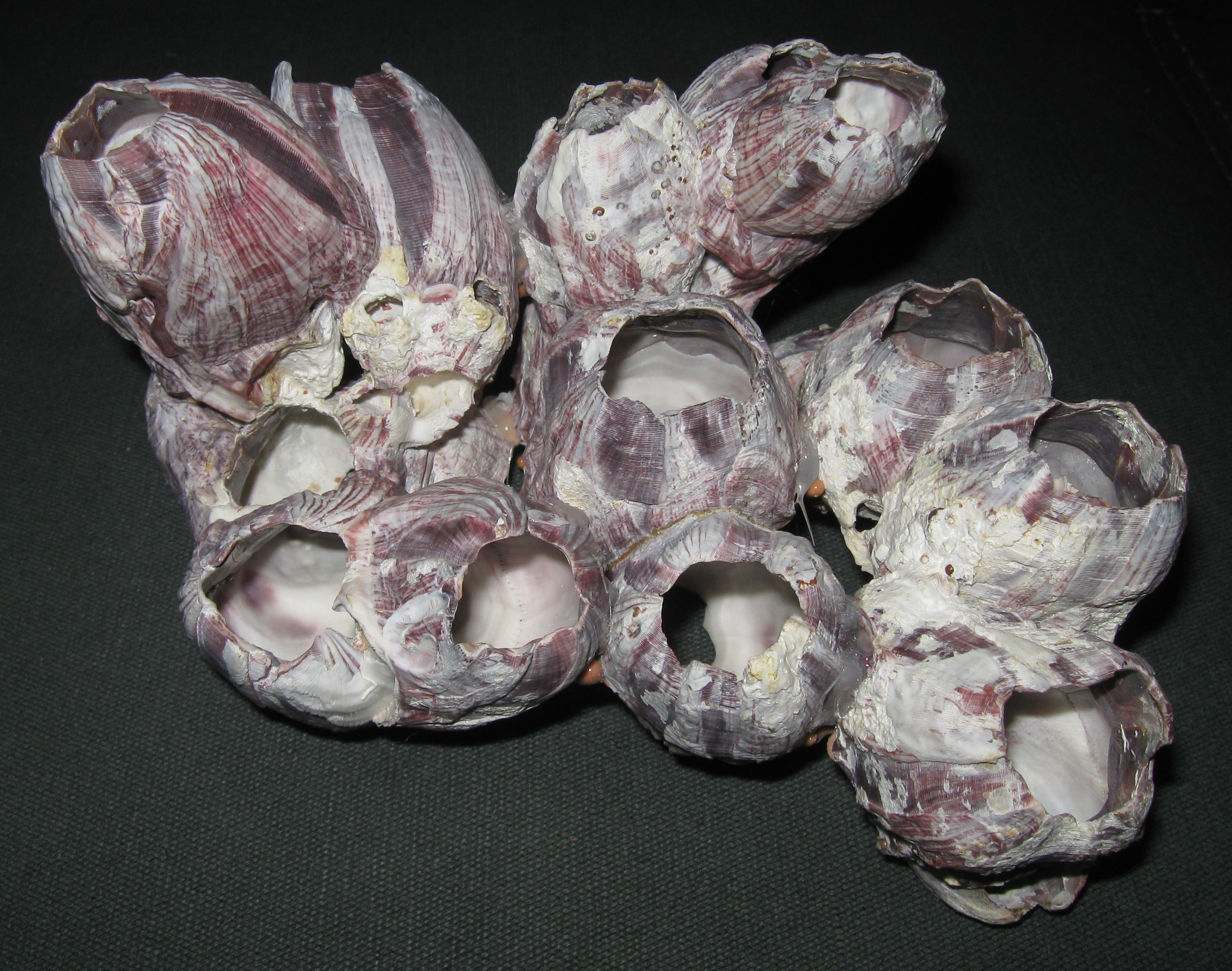
- Fossilized M. tintinnabulum shells

Scientific classification
- Kingdom: Animalia
- Phylum: Arthropoda
- Clade: Pancrustacea
- Class: Thecostraca
- Subclass: Cirripedia
- Order: Balanomorpha
- Family: Balanidae
- Subfamily: Megabalaninae
- Genus: Megabalanus; Hoek, 1913

= Megabalanus =

Megabalanus Temporal range: Miocene–Recent

Genus of barnacles

Megabalanus is a genus of barnacles in the family Balanidae. Members of the genus grow to 7 cm (2.8 in) in length and inhabit the lower intertidal zone.

== Morphology ==
Megabalanus is an acorn barnacle, a sessile crustacean that secretes a calcium carbonate shell consisting of five plates. It reaches up to 7 cm (2.8 in) in height .

== Ecology ==
Like other barnacles, they are suspension feeders, grabbing particulate matter from the water column overhead. M. tintinnabulum has a worldwide distribution and is commonly found on wave-beaten shores, in the lower intertidal zone. They tend to grow in clusters of around 12 individuals. Other species are more select, such as M. californicus of tidal habitats in California and the greater North American Pacific Coast.

While many barnacles deal with competition for space by organisms such as limpets and mussels by growing many organisms close together in colonies, Megabalanus responds by rapidly growing to a very large size. Their large size also helps reduce predation, although it makes them large enough to be harvested for human consumption.

== Geological utility ==
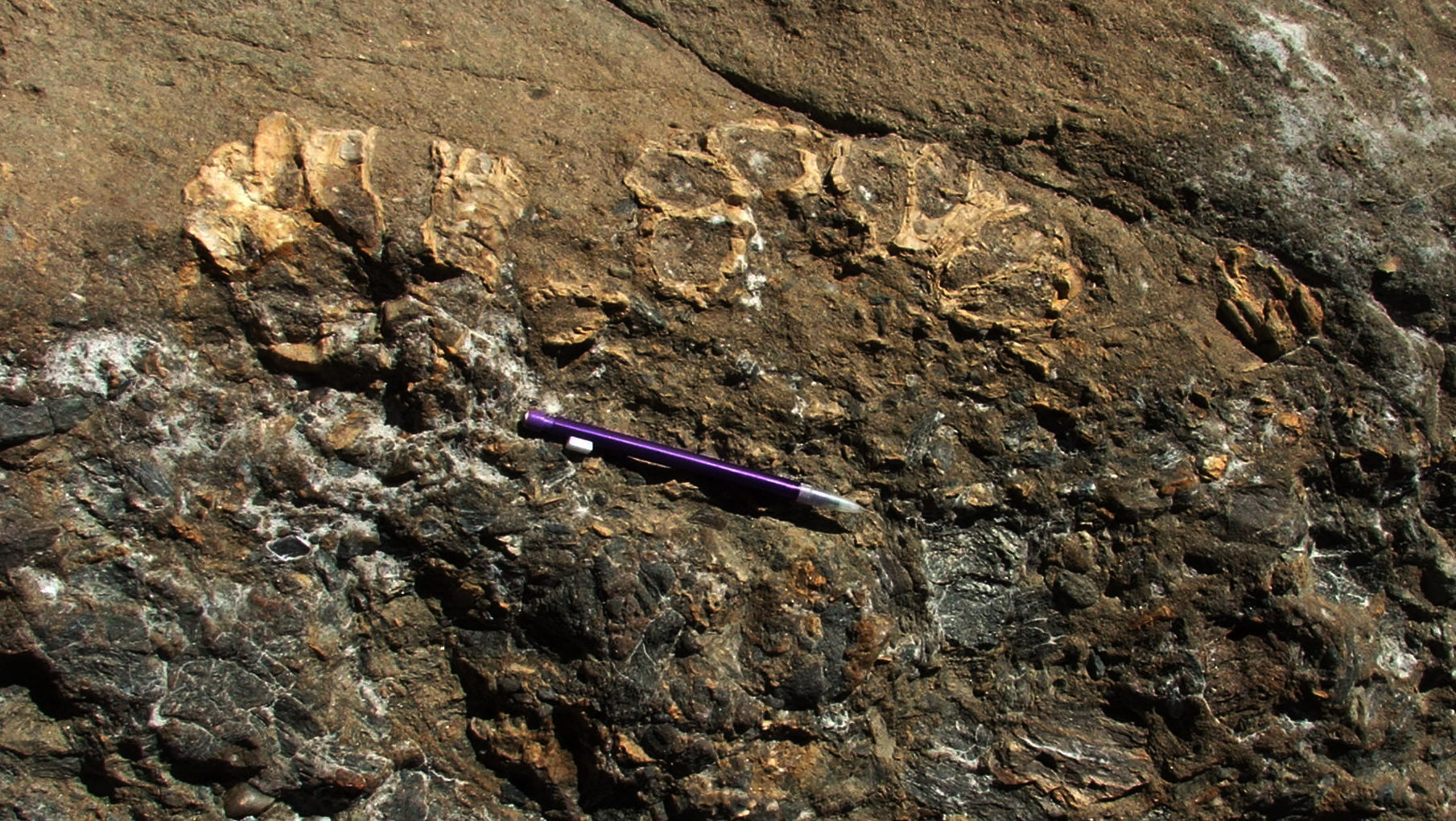
Fossilised M. tintinnabulum(?), which grew on a boulderous debris fan (preserved as dark breccia, bottom), and were smothered by deposition of sands (orange upper layer), hence preserved in situ.

Fossilised specimens of Megabalanus have been found dating back to the Miocene. Fossils bearing a close resemblance to M. tintinnabulum are preserved in large numbers in the Tabernas Basin of Spain. A case study of this area showed that the state of preservation of the organisms makes possible estimating the distance they were transported post mortem . Since the species today lives in the intertidal zone, this allows an estimate to be made of the distance from the shoreline, and by implication, the water depth. These observations are backed up by the appearance of the deep-water trace fossil Zoophycum in the predicted deepest waters, suggesting that barnacles can be a good proxy for water depth.

== Species ==
The World Register of Marine Species includes these species in the genus:

- Megabalanus ajax (Darwin, 1854)
- Megabalanus antillensis (Pilsbry, 1916)
- Megabalanus azoricus (Pilsbry, 1916) (Azorean barnacle)
- Megabalanus californicus (Pilsbry, 1916) (California barnacle)
- Megabalanus clippertonensis Zullo, 1969
- Megabalanus coccopoma (Darwin, 1854) (titan acorn barnacle)
- Megabalanus costatus (Hoek, 1913)
- Megabalanus crispatus (Schröter) Darwin, 1854
- Megabalanus dolfusii (de Alessandri, 1907)
- Megabalanus dorbignii (chenu, 1843)
- Megabalanus galapaganus (Pilsbry, 1916)
- Megabalanus giganteum (Kolosváry, 1949)
- Megabalanus honti (Kolosváry, 1950)
- Megabalanus hungaricus (Kolosváry, 1941)
- Megabalanus javanicus (Whithers, 1923)
- Megabalanus leganyii (Kolosváry, 1950)
- Megabalanus linzei (Foster, 1978)
- Megabalanus multiseptatus (Ross, 1964)
- Megabalanus occator (Darwin, 1854)
- Megabalanus peninsularis (Pilsbry, 1916)
- Megabalanus plicatus (Hoek, 1913)
- Megabalanus rosa Pilsbry, 1916 (acorn barnacle)
- Megabalanus seguenzai (de Alessandri, 1895)
- Megabalanus spinosus (Gmelin, 1791)
- Megabalanus stultus (Darwin, 1854)
- Megabalanus tanagrae (Pilsbry, 1928)
- Megabalanus tintinnabulum (Linnaeus, 1758) (titan acorn barnacle)
- Megabalanus transsylvanicus (Kolosváry, 1950)
- Megabalanus transversostriatus (Beurlen, 1958)
- Megabalanus tulipiformis (Ellis, 1758)
- Megabalanus validus Darwin, 1854
- Megabalanus venezuelensis (Weisbord, 1966)
- Megabalanus vesiculosus (Darwin, 1854)
- Megabalanus vinaceus (Darwin, 1854)
- Megabalanus volcano (Pilsbry, 1916)
- Megabalanus xishaensis (Ren & Liu, 1978)
- Megabalanus yamaguchii Karasawa & Kobayashi, 2025
- Megabalanus zebra Russell et al., 2003
