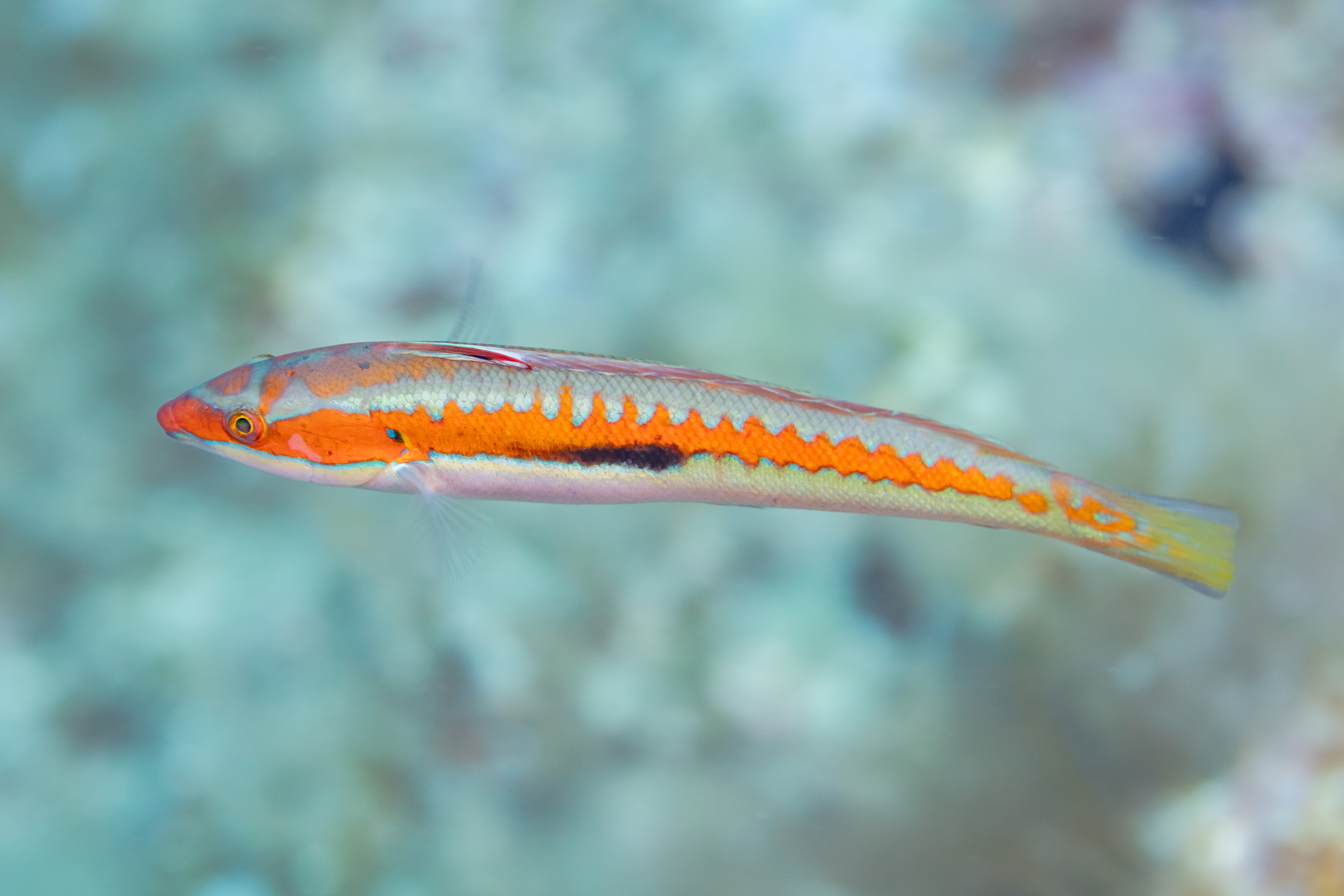
- Male in the coast of Cape Palos (Spain)

Conservation status
- Least Concern (IUCN 3.1)

Scientific classification
- Kingdom: Animalia
- Phylum: Chordata
- Class: Actinopterygii
- Division: Teleostei
- Order: Labriformes
- Family: Labridae
- Genus: Coris
- Species: C. julis

Binomial name
- Coris julis (Linnaeus, 1758)

Synonyms
- List: Labrus julis Linnaeus, 1758; Julis julis (Linnaeus, 1758); Labrus paroticus Linnaeus, 1758; Labrus perdica Forsskål, 1775; Labrus infuscus Walbaum, 1792; Labrus subfuscus Bloch & Schneider, 1801; Labrus keslik Lacépède, 1801; Labrus cettii Rafinesque, 1810; Labrus giofredi Risso, 1810; Julis mediterranea Risso, 1827; Julis speciosa Risso, 1827; Coris speciosa (Risso, 1827); Julis vulgaris J. Fleming, 1828; Julis melanura R. T. Lowe, 1839; Coris festiva (Valenciennes, 1839); Julis vulgaris Valenciennes, 1839; Coris taeniatus Steindachner, 1863; Julis azorensis Fowler, 1919

= Mediterranean rainbow wrasse =

Species of fish

Coris julis also known by its common name, the Mediterranean rainbow wrasse, is a Mediterranean and Eastern Atlantic fish. Phylogenetically they belong to the Labridae family, also known as the wrasses. Within their genus, Coris, there are a total of 28 species. As discussed more in the Life History section below, they can present with more than one coloration. This is because they are diandric protogynous hermaphrodites. These fish are born as what scientists term primary males and females and can transition from a female to a secondary male. Primary individuals are described to be less than 18cm in length and all those larger are secondary males.

== Coloration ==
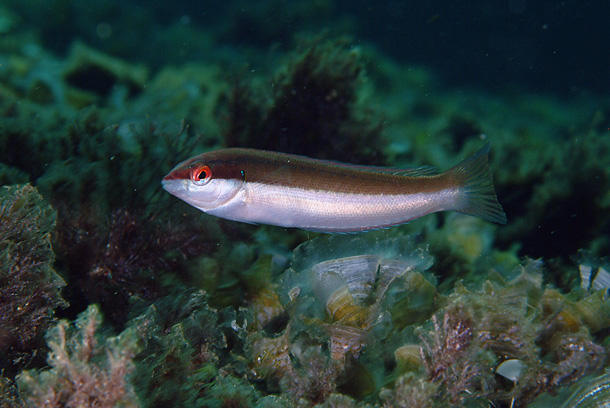
Female near Livorno (Mediterranean population)

C. julis were once thought to be two separate species with C. julis only representing the brightly colored fish (now known as secondary or terminal phase males) and the primary individuals referred to as C. giofredi. Though it is now known that this coloration can be both male or female. Primary individuals typically showcase an orange-brown back with a whiteish-yellow bellow and black horizontal stripe.

Secondary males are bluish grey to greenish brown with a white belly and orange zig zag. An orange stripe extends from the snout of the individual to the base of its caudal fin (tail) as well as a black band below the orange one extending from pectoral axil to anal fin origin.

Intermediate males are black or purple/brown with an orange eye, orange-brown stripe below their snout through their eye and opercle (bony gill covering) upper edge extending to the base of the caudal fin. Their lower body is white with a bluish/black spot on the upper side of the pectoral axil and opercle. In addition, the caudal fin is noticeably grey at the base and yellow posteriorly, with a more yellow anal and dorsal fin as well.

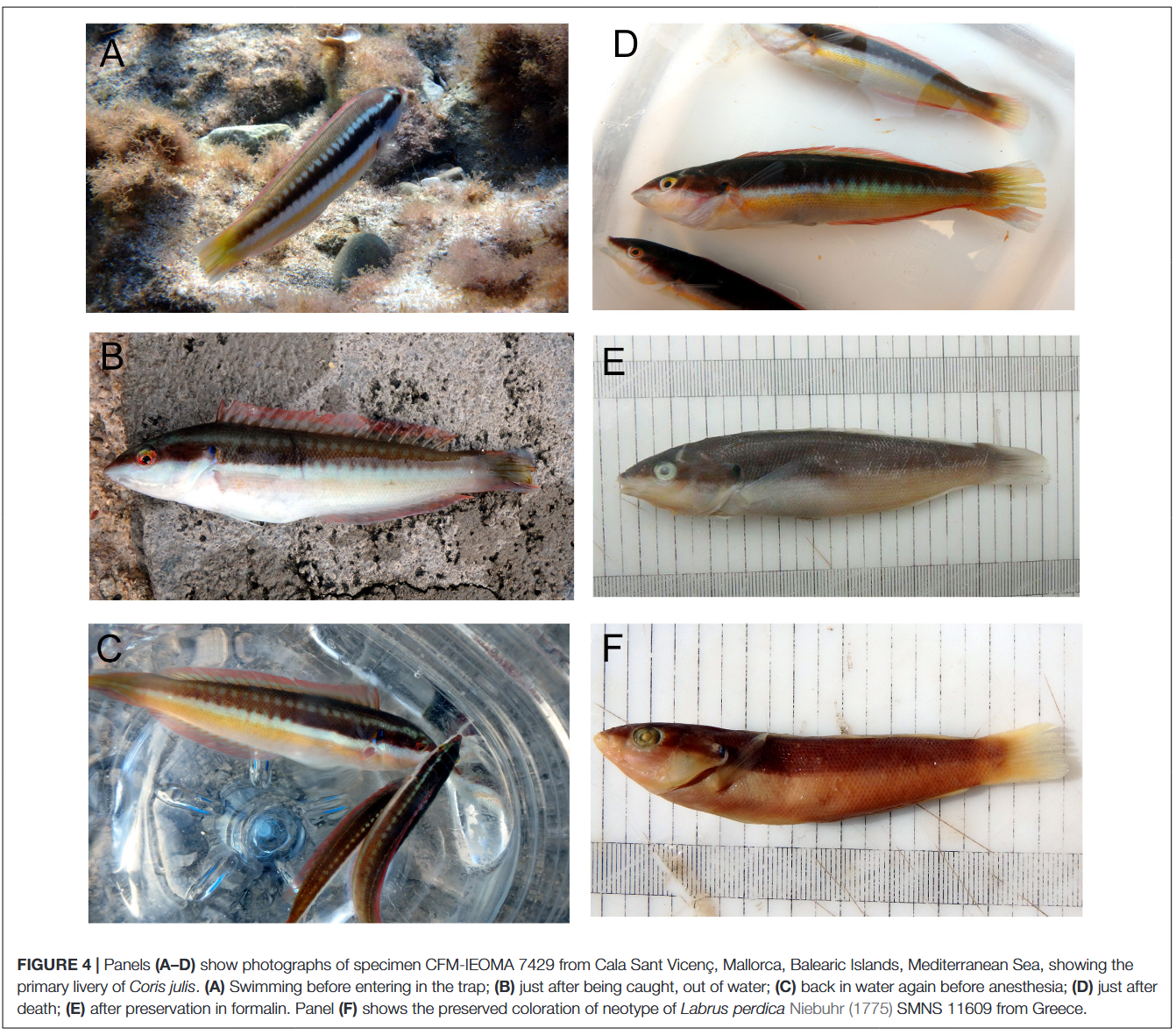
Coris julis primary individual (Ramirez-Amaro et al., 2021)

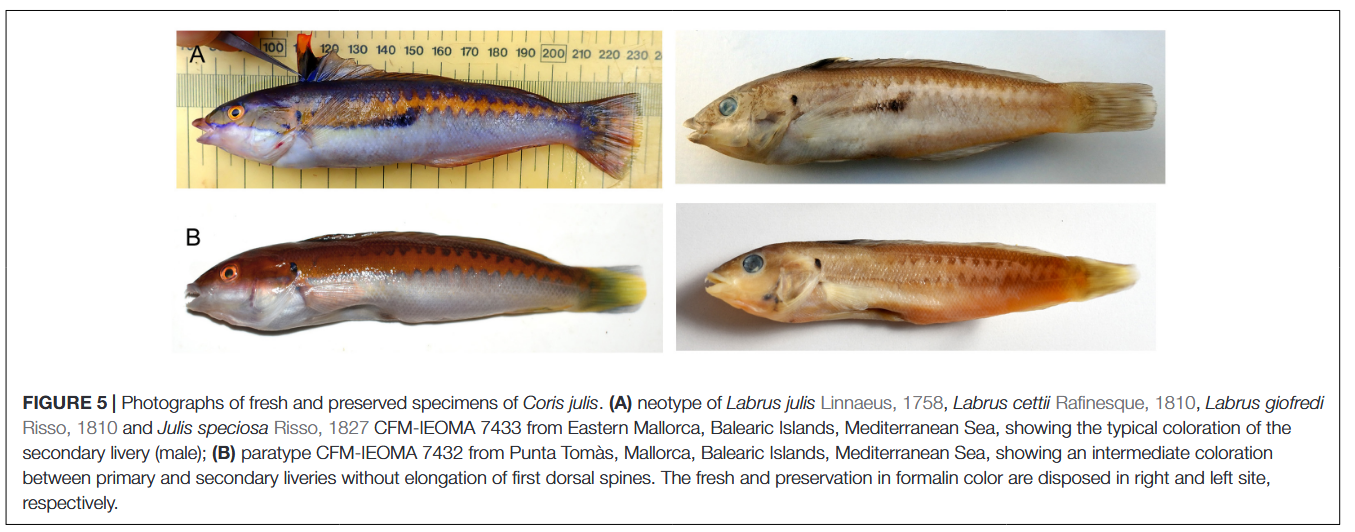
Coris julis secondary individual (Ramirez-Amaro et al., 2021)

== Body description ==
Characteristics of the species include body shape and structural anatomy. Though secondary males are longer, all individuals have been described with either a long and slender, slightly compressed, or fusiform body shape. Their flexible bodies allow them to make sharp turns, swimming mainly with their pectoral fins and using the caudal and ventral for stability.

They have a terminal mouth that is slightly oblique, in which the upper and lower jaws have recurved canine teeth. There is more space in the upper jaw to allow for the lower jaw to fit in when the mouth is closed. The second tooth is 2/3 the length of the first one and recurved. The upper jaw contains 9-11 more teeth which get progressively smaller and less pointed. The same is true for the lower jaw except there are only 9–10 more teeth. The upper pharyngeal plates both contain 15–25 teeth which are conical and blunt. There are 3 molars on the posterior side of the median edge, the largest being twice the size of the second largest.

They have cycloid scales, a feature of Teleostei fishes, and are derived from ganoid scales. These scales grow with the fish, producing growth rings much like those in a tree and can be used to age the fish. In addition, these scales overlap, giving Teleostei fishes increased flexibility. These scales appear on their chest and sides which get smaller both ventrally (towards the belly) and anteriorly (towards the head). Their lateral line scales are roughly equal in size except for the last one pored scale at the base of the caudal fin which is larger. There are no scales present at the base of the dorsal fin which begins at the 5th lateral line scale, or the anal or paired fins. Additionally scales cover around 1/5 of the caudal fin. Within the fins, there are 8–10 dorsal rays, 12 soft rays in the dorsal fin, 3 anal spines and 11–12 soft rays, 12 pectoral rays, and 72–74 lateral line scales. There are 4–6 cephalic pores (small openings in head, part of lateral line sensory system) in the snout.

== Close relatives ==
While C. julis is well known as a close relative of C. atlantica, the species C. melanura is a much less recognized relative. The 2021 study by Ramirez-Amaro et al. discussed evidence based on morphological analysis for a separation of C. julis into two distinct sister species. Coris melanura or the Blacktail rainbow wrasse is described to have the same number of soft dorsal rays, lateral line scales, and 1 more pectoral ray. In terms of coloration, this species is described to have a few different identifying marks including primary individuals possessing a thin black line from the upper half of its body starting behind the orbit and reaching all the way to half of the caudal fin. It also has a small triangle dark spot between the second and third dorsal spines, and 6–8 longitudinal red dots on its white belly. The secondary males are described to have a black caudal fin and a longitudinal series of black, yellow, or red spots along their sides.

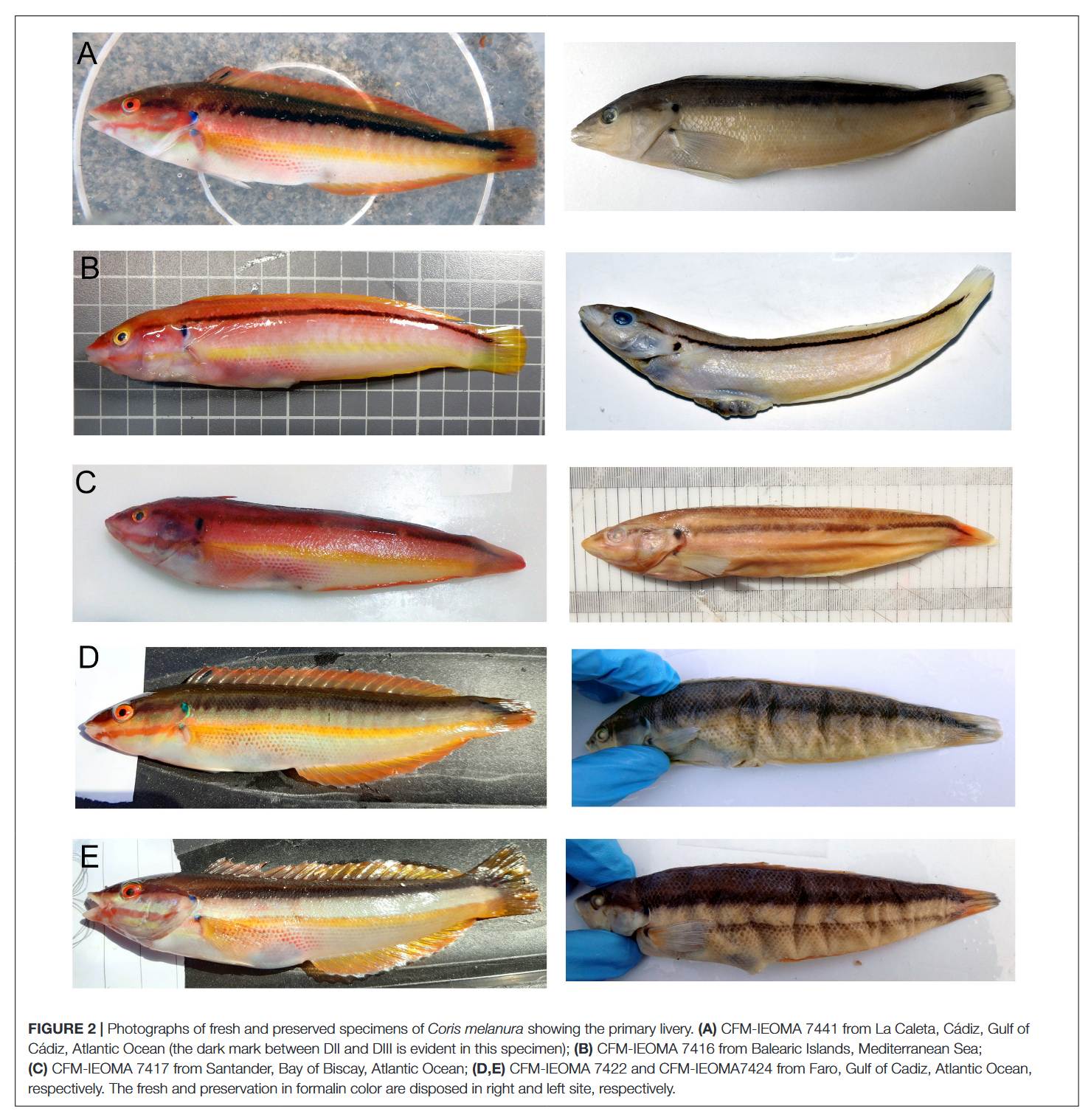
Coris melanura primary individual (Ramirez-Amaro et al., 2021)

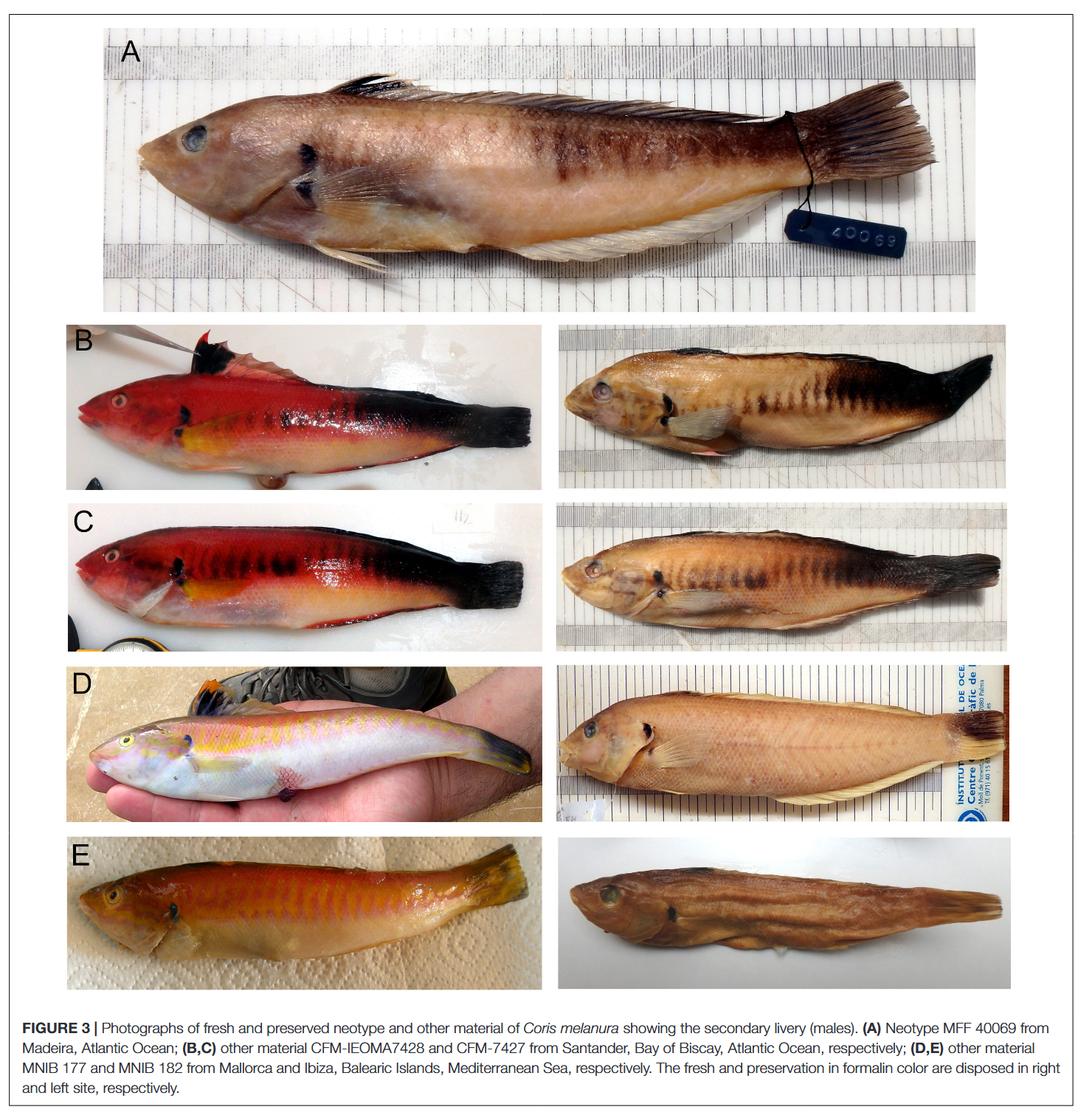
Coris melanura secondary individual (Ramirez-Amaro et al., 2021)

== Distribution ==
C. julis typically inhabits rock/sandy substrates at the oceans floor and can commonly be found in seagrass beds. They also bury themselves in sand between sunset and sunrise. These habitats are in shallower coastal waters, and their standard depth range has been described as 0–50m with extremes of 0–120m. Geographically, as their name indicates, these fish are found in the Mediterranean Sea with an apparently even distribution. However, it can also be found as far North as Norway and as far South as Senegal. Further south you begin to see the related species Coris atlantica which is less widespread and lives in Western-central Africa. These two species represent the only 2 in the genus Coris found in the Eastern Atlantic. The other 26 are found in the Indo-Pacific. Although based upon the study mentioned under Species Description, C. julis should be split into C. julis and C. menalura.

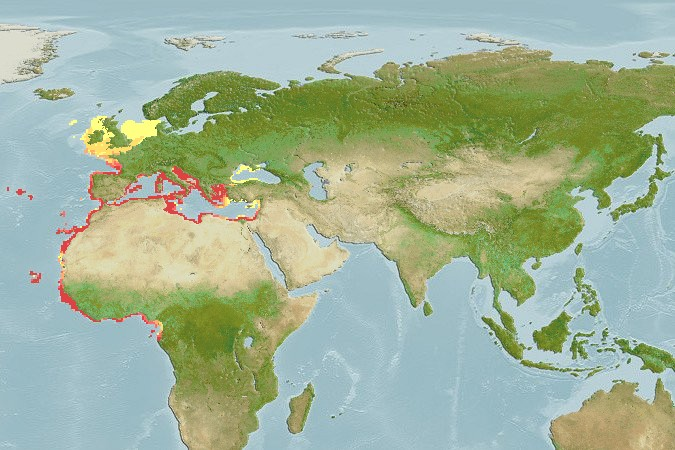
Computer-generated distribution map (Aqua Maps)

== Life history ==
Behavior and feeding

As mentioned above, this species lives in rocky or sandy substrates as well as seagrass beds at typical depths of 0–50 m. They feed on benthic organisms such as mollusks and crustaceans. They forage in groups by day, disappearing before sunset by burying themselves in the sand and reemerging at sunrise. One study even showed that the fish are in a sleeplike state at night, indicated by their lowered reactiveness. C. julis are also documented to be territorial, though only the secondary males exhibit this behavior. Although they are territorial, they do not control the movements of females within their territory or where they spawn. One study showed that secondary males are more likely to be territorial with other males when they can distinguish between long and short-wave colors. This is notable as colors like red and orange don't penetrate far into the water column, but secondary males do display a bright orange stripe.

== Reproduction, mating, and sex reversal ==
When mating, the terminal males swim rapidly with their dorsal fins erect in short up and down motions. Both phases of males can mate but secondary males have higher success rates for spawning. After the mating ritual, eggs are fertilized and hatch about two days later. They live as larvae with the zooplankton for about a month then fall to the bottom of the ocean and begin their juvenile stage. They are known to be reproductively active between May and July in the Balearic Islands. This life history strategy of non-year-round reproduction allows C. julis to put resources toward growth the rest of the year without sacrificing reproductive success. It is also during this post spawning season time between August and December that they undergo sex inversion. C. julis is classified as a diandric protogynous hermaphrodite. Diandric species are those with two male categories and protogyny is the sex-inversion from female to male. Sex change is common in the Labridae family, and for C. julis the shift in color occurs at the same time. Spermatongial nets appear along the ovarian wall and spread inward. This makes telling secondary and primary males apart difficult. All stages and sexes are functional, including primary males who are male at first maturation and do not undergo sex inversion.

== Conservation status and recreation ==
According to the IUCN redlist, C. julis is listed as stable and of Least Concern as of the 2019 assessments. There are no commercial fisheries known for this fish however, it is possible they could be caught as bycatch and have been known to be caught for food. They also face the same issues that all marine fish face in the 21st century such as pollution, coastal development, etc. Mediterranean rainbow wrasse are also common aquarium fish. Some recommendations are for a tank of at least 55 gallons with a pH of 8.1–8.4 and a temperature of 60–70F. Providing rocky structures and sea grass with a sandy bottom deep enough to bury themselves in is recommended as it mimics their natural habitat. It is not recommended to keep them with much smaller fish as Rainbow wrasse are predators, so if you want to place other species in the tank, larger and more aggressive fish are recommended. They are also prone to common diseases like ich or dropsy and retail for around $30–50.

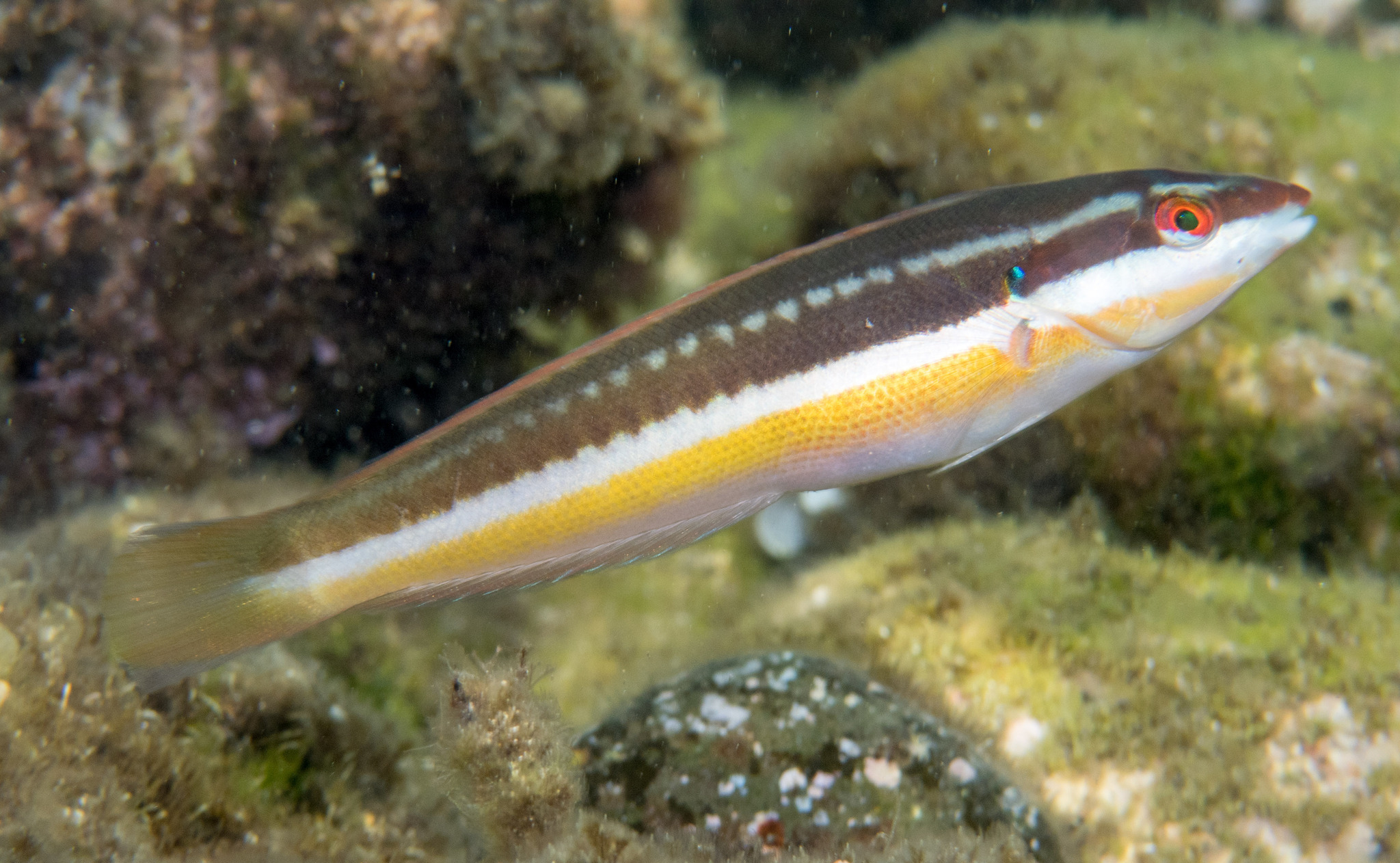
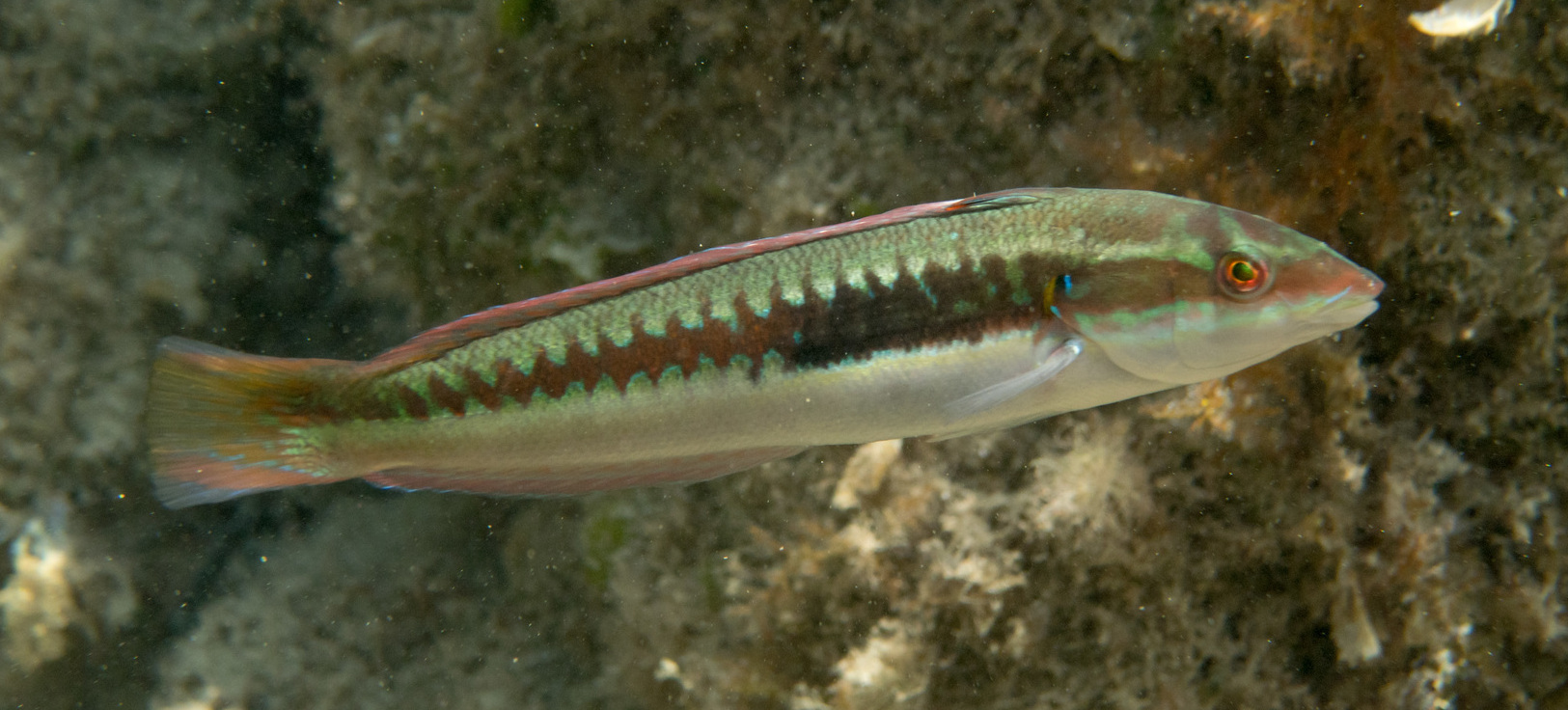
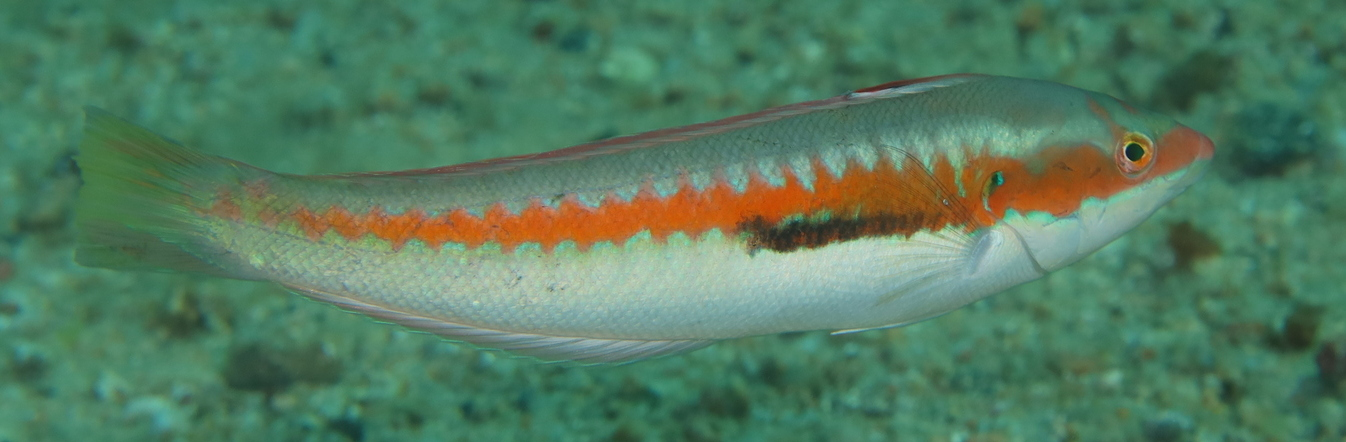
Showing colour changes as females (left) transition into males (right)

== Gallery ==
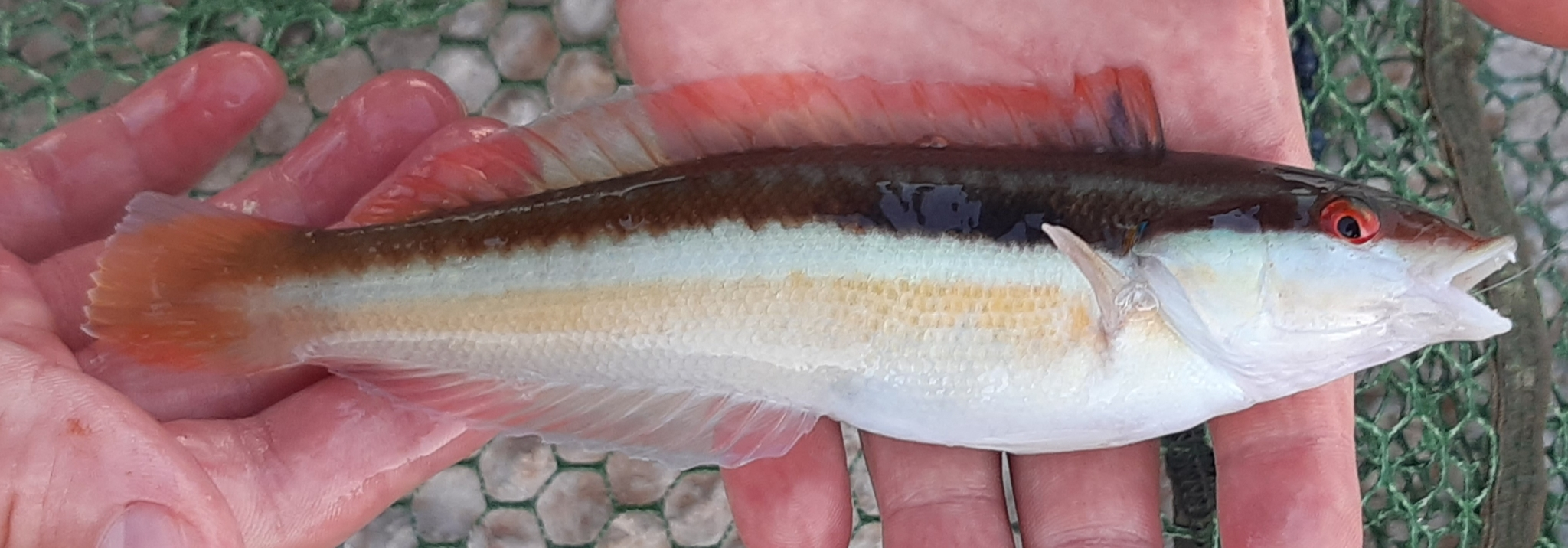
Primary Individual

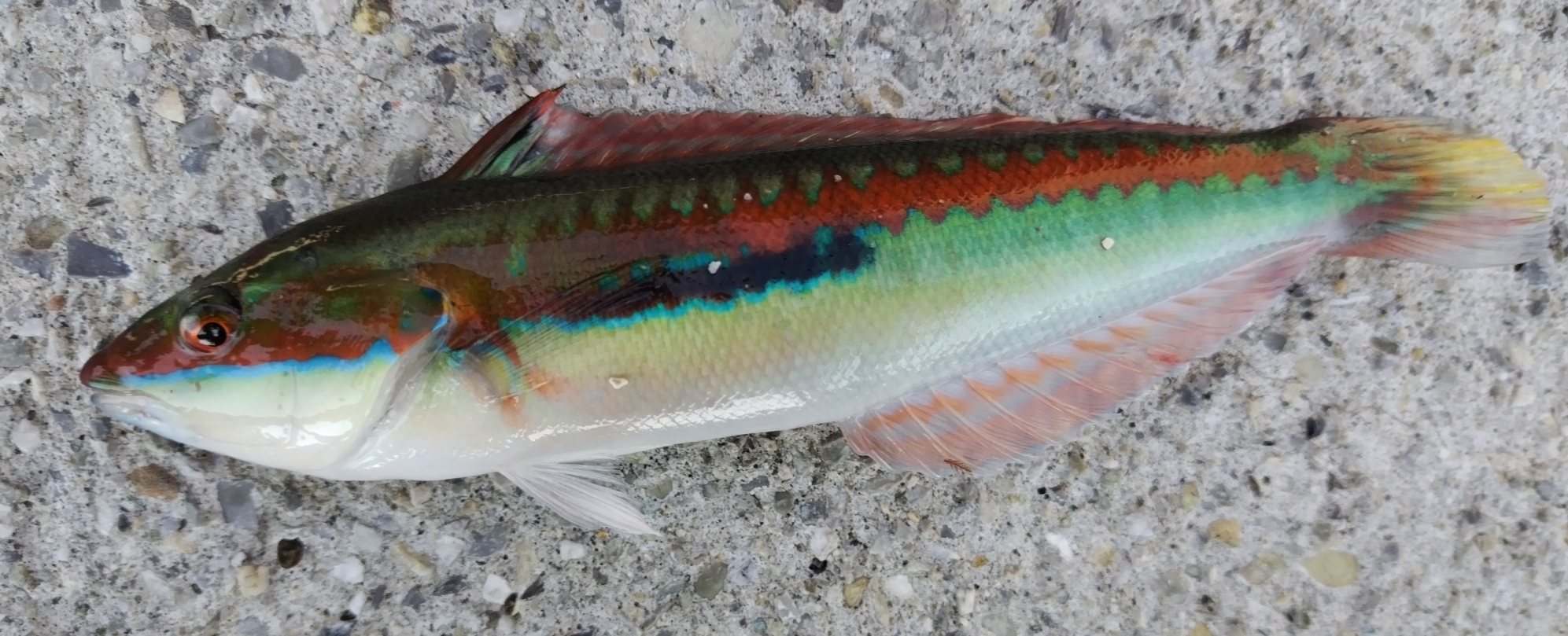
Secondary Male

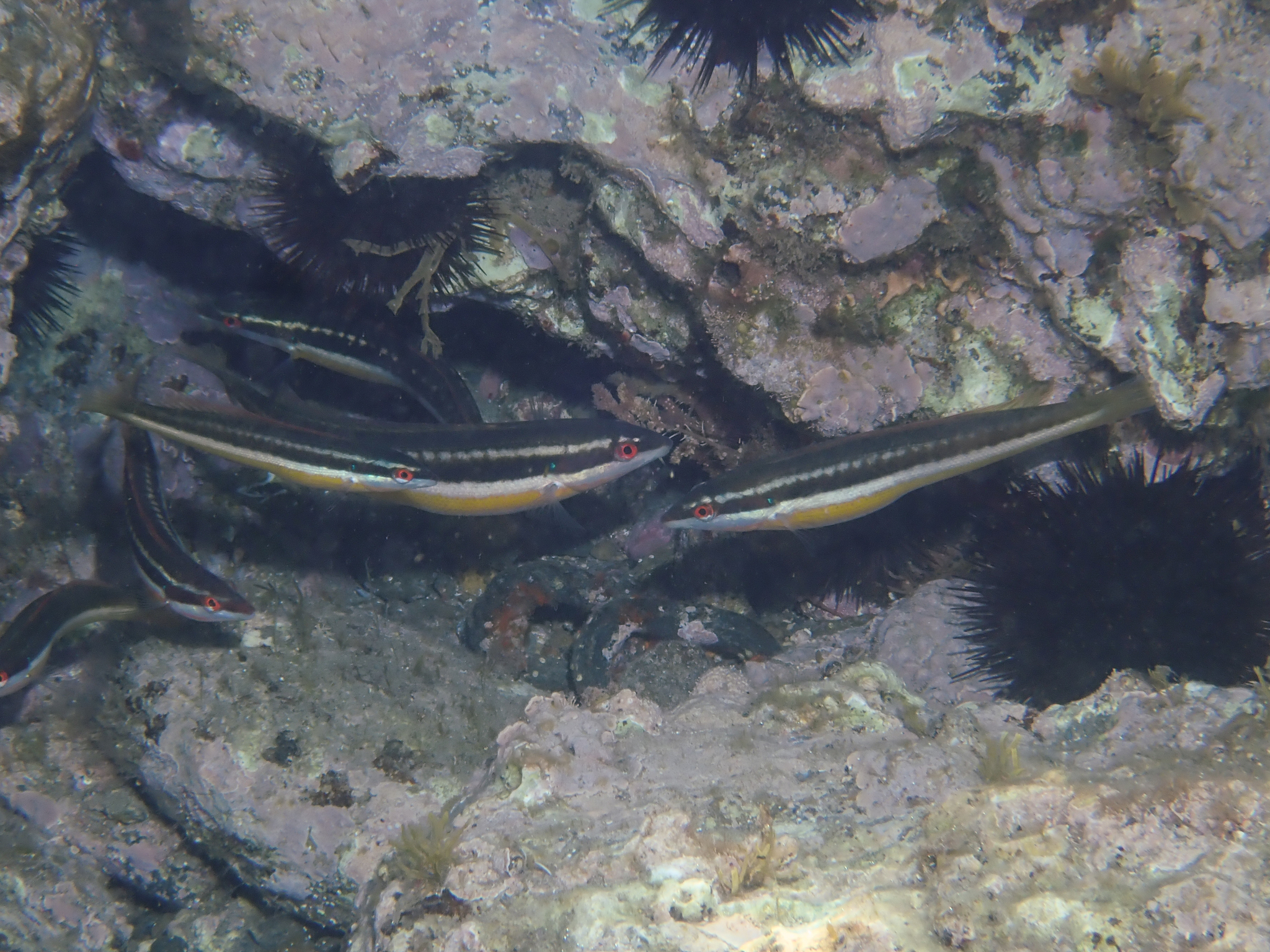
Primary Individuals

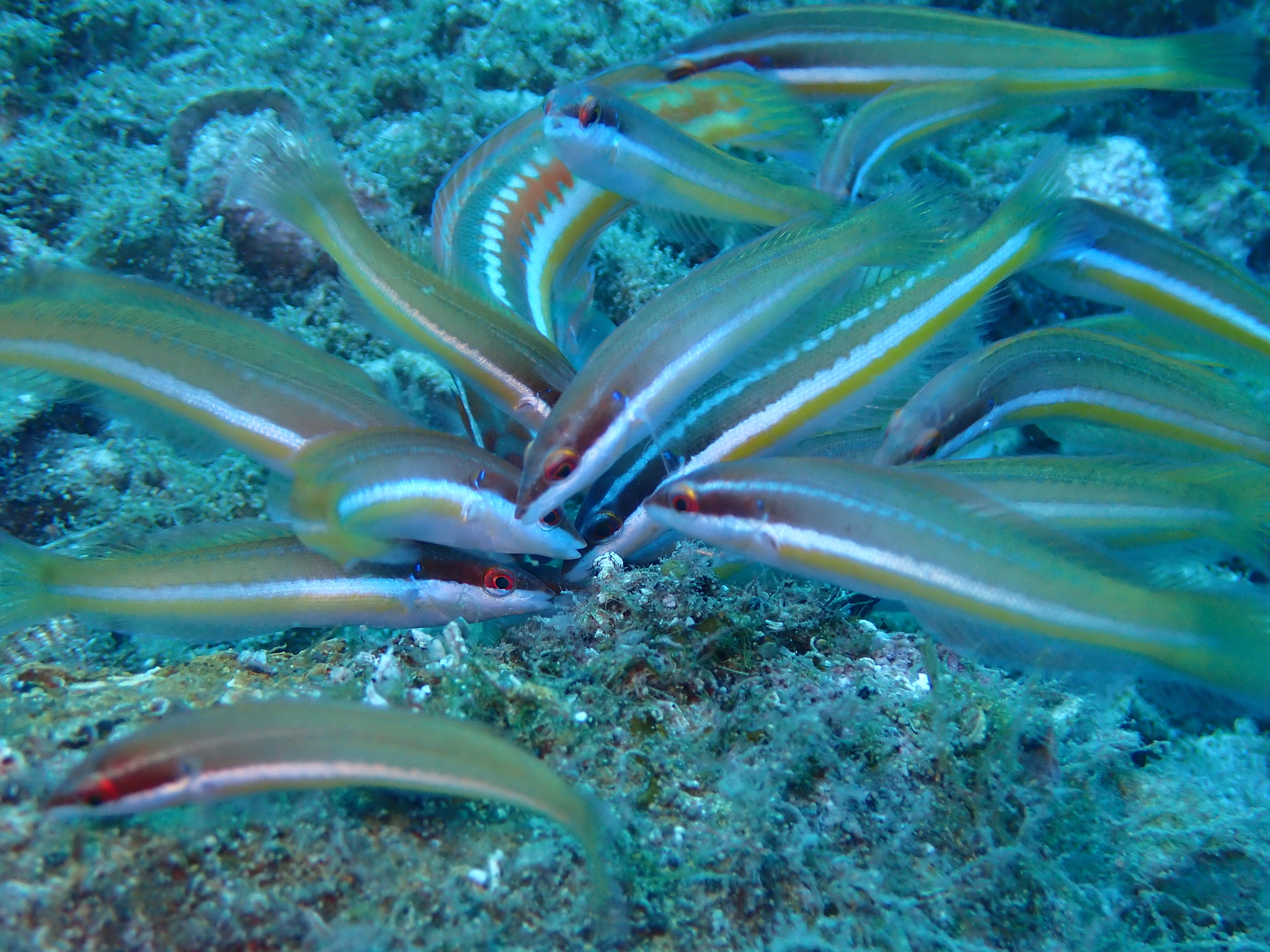
Feeding

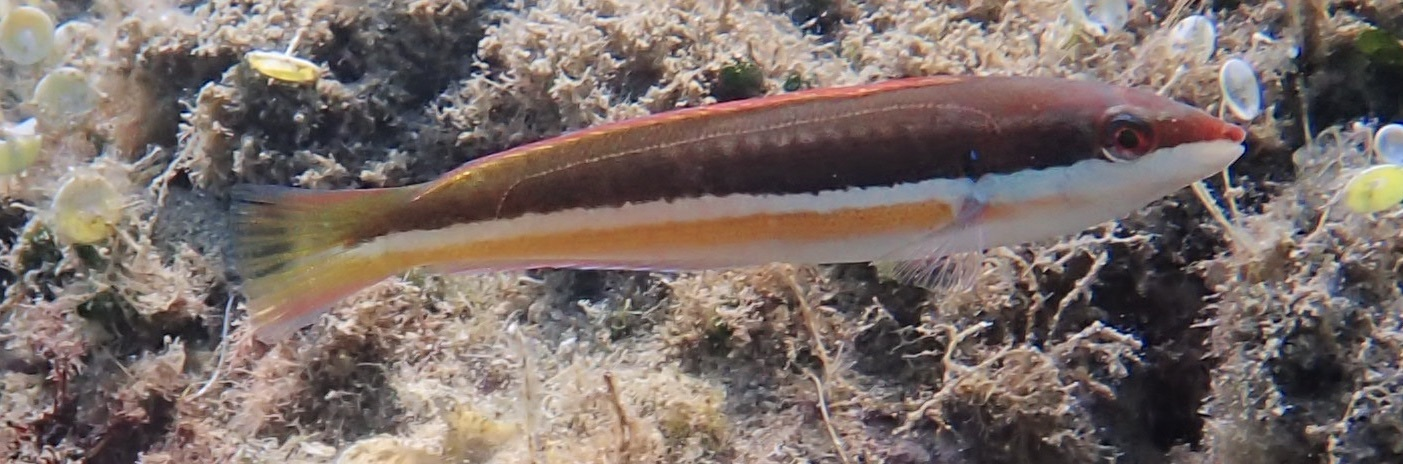
Primary Individual

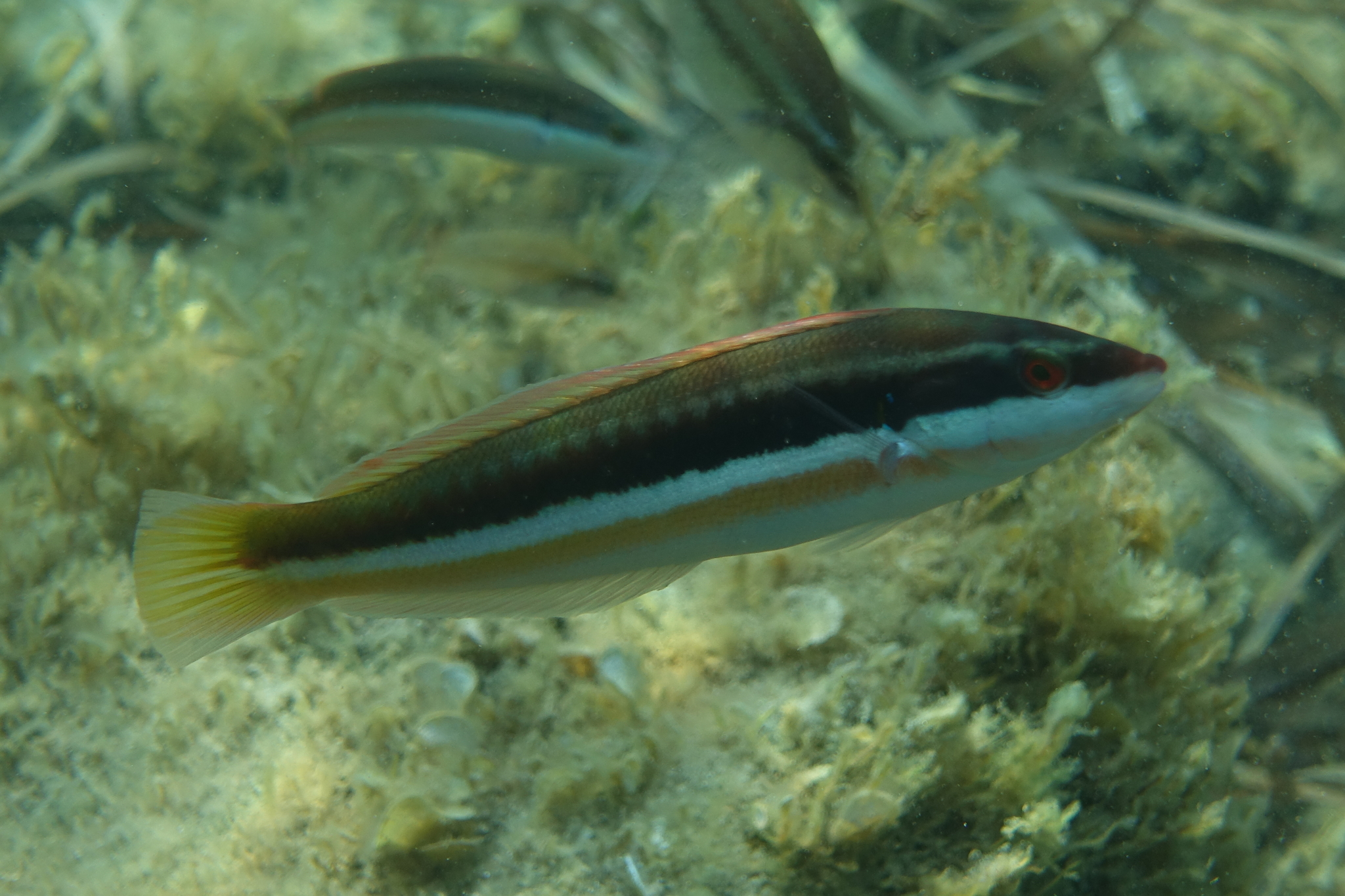
Female

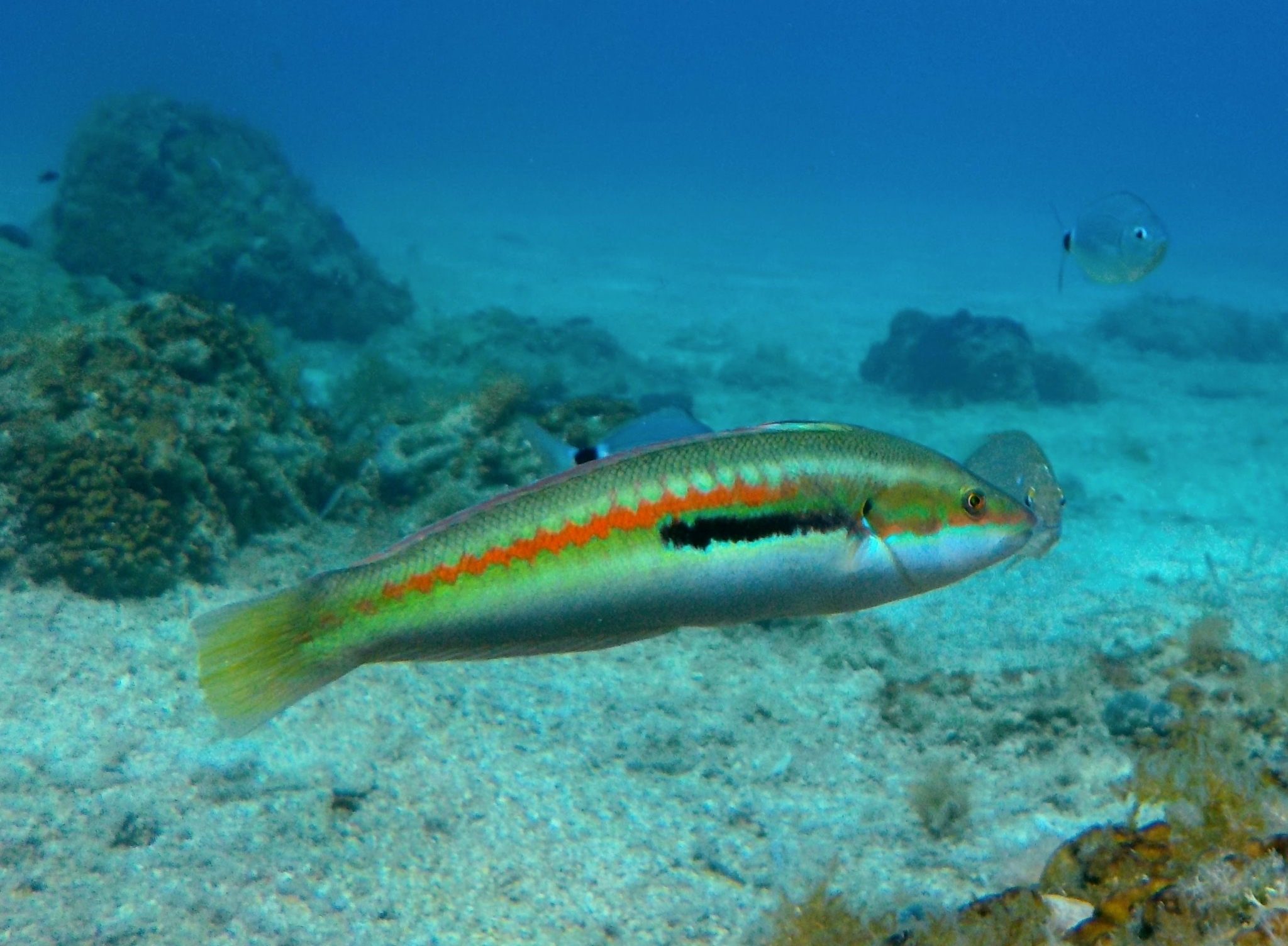
Secondary Individual

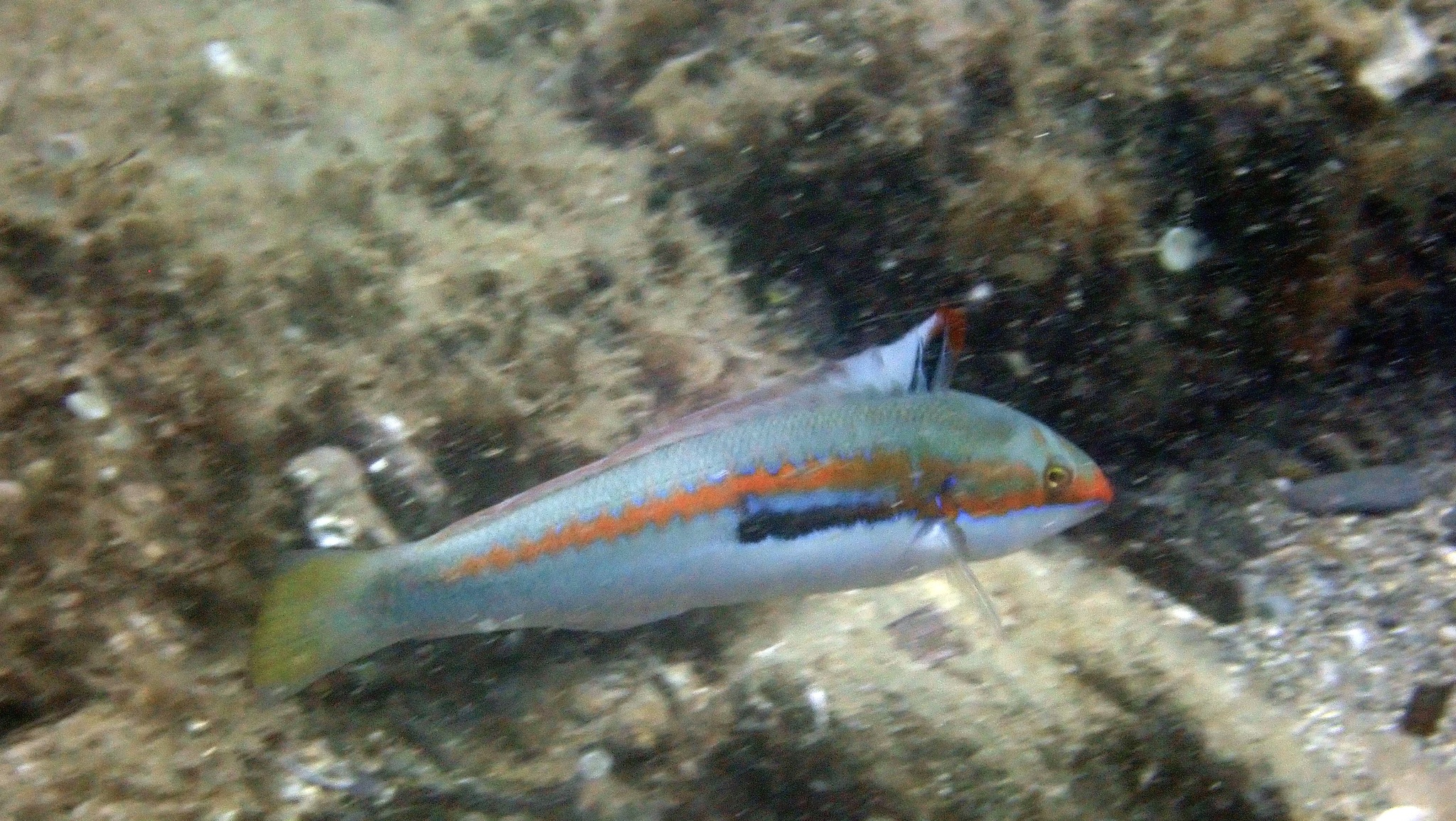
Secondary Male displaying dorsal fin

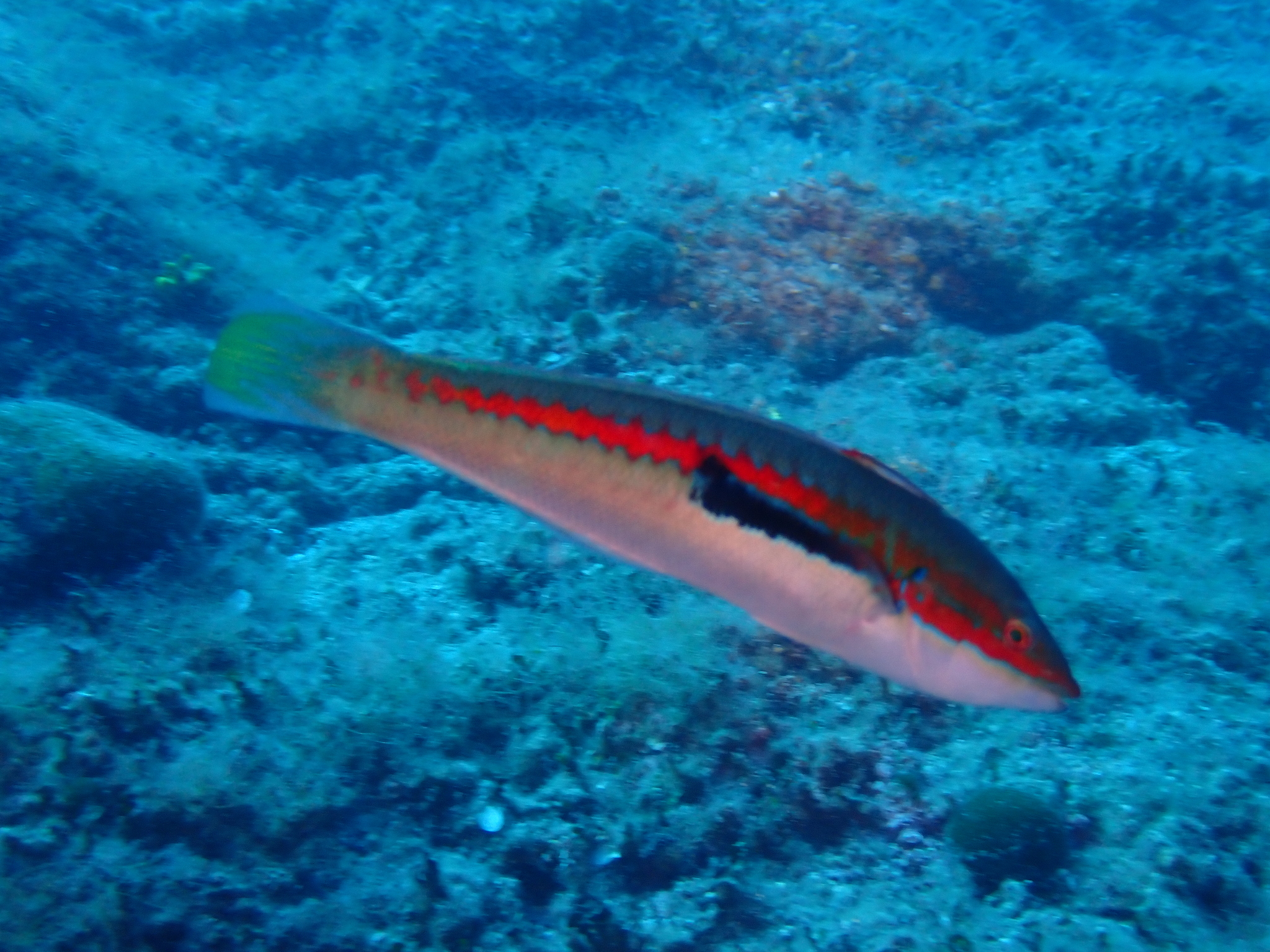
Secondary Male

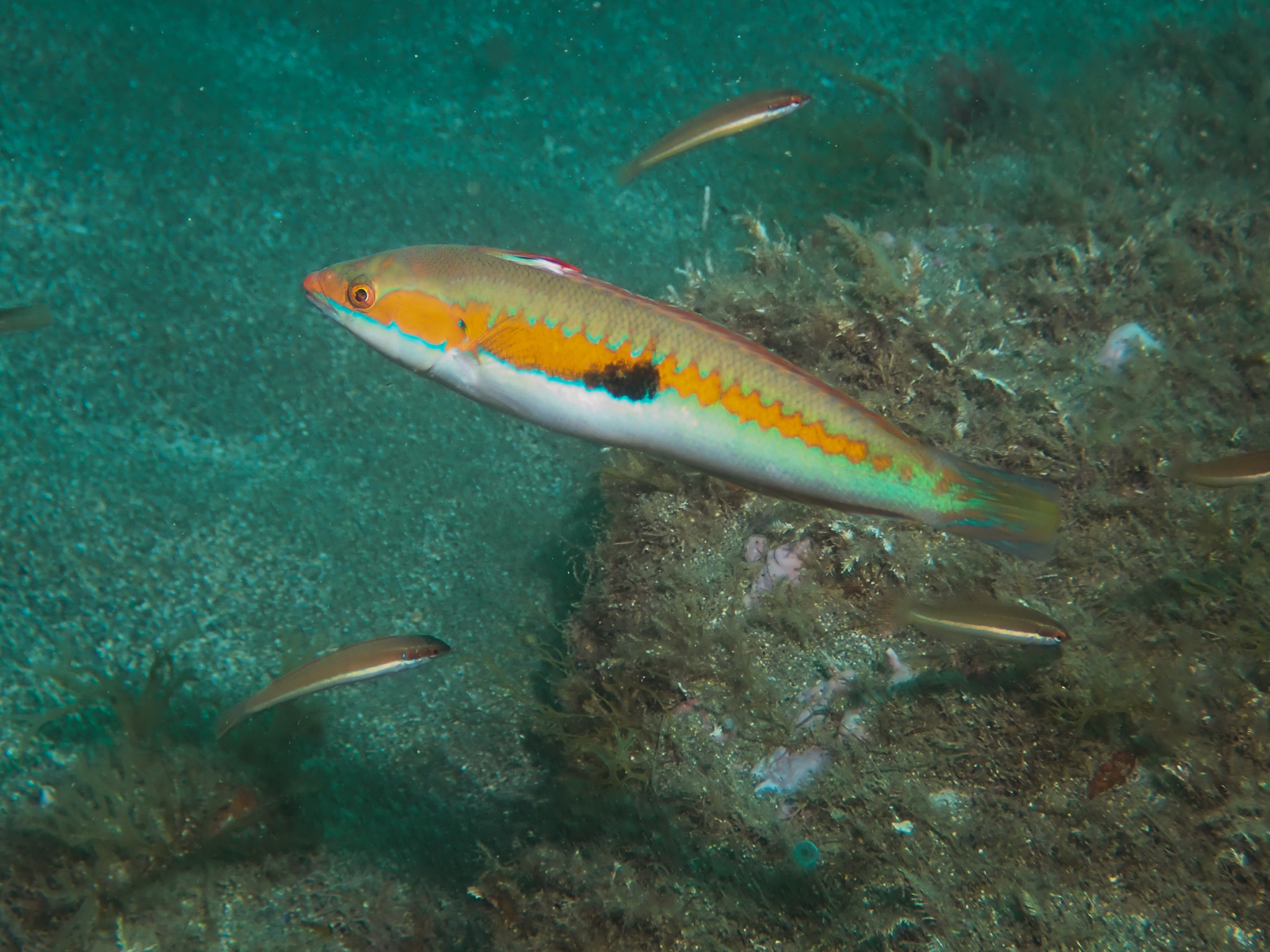
Secondary Male Male
