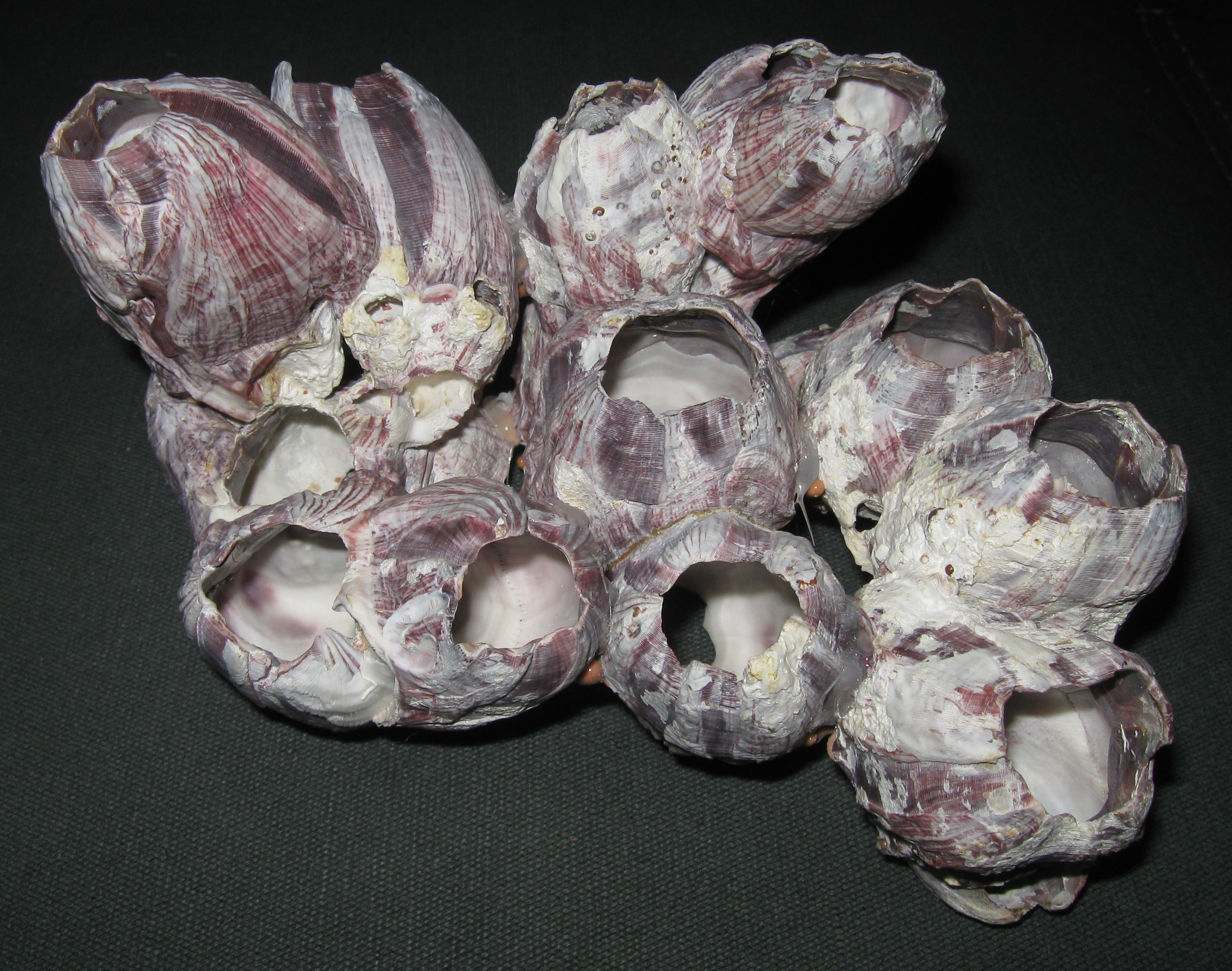
- A group of empty shells

Scientific classification
- Kingdom: Animalia
- Phylum: Arthropoda
- Clade: Pancrustacea
- Class: Thecostraca
- Subclass: Cirripedia
- Order: Balanomorpha
- Family: Balanidae
- Genus: Megabalanus
- Species: M. tintinnabulum

Binomial name
- Megabalanus tintinnabulum (Linnaeus, 1758)

Synonyms
- Balanus tintinnabulum Linnaeus, 1758

= Megabalanus tintinnabulum =

Species of barnacle

Megabalanus tintinnabulum is a species of large barnacle in the family Balanidae. It is the type species of the genus. The specific name comes from the Latin tintinnabulum meaning a handbell and probably refers to the fact that small groups of barnacles resemble clusters of miniature bells.

== Taxonomy ==
When Carl Linnaeus first described this species in 1758, he named it Balanus tintinnabulum. The lectotype was depicted by Georg Eberhard Rumphius in 1705, the type locality being Ambon, Indonesia. In a monograph on barnacles in 1854, Charles Darwin described the species as being very variable and assigned it to Section A of the genus Balanus, characterised by having the parietes, basis, and radii (different plates in the shell wall) permeated by minute pores. In 1916, Henry Augustus Pilsbry elevated Balanus tintinnabulum to subspecies rank and in subsequent years a number of varieties were described. Later it was placed in the subgenus Megabalanus and in 1976, Newman and Ross elevated Megabalanus to generic rank, giving species rank to each of the 22 subspecies of what had previously been known as Balanus (Megabalanus) tintinnabulum.

== Description ==
Megabalanus tintinnabulum is a large barnacle, barrel-shaped or narrowly conical, up to 5 cm (2 in) tall and 6.5 cm (2.6 in) in diameter. It is distinguished from other members of the genus by having ungrooved growth ridges on the scutum and by the parietes having no spines or spiny projections. The parietes can be either rough or smooth, and they are sometimes slightly folded. The basal margin of the shell is either straight or slightly sinuous. The colour is a pale shade of reddish or bluish purple, sometimes streaked longitudinally with a darker or lighter shade and sometimes with transverse bands of colour.

== Distribution and habitat ==
Megabalanus tintinnabulum is of tropical origin, perhaps being native to West Africa and parts of the Indo-Pacific. It is common on both the eastern and western coasts of India. It has spread to other parts of the world attached to the hulls of ships. It was observed on ships' hulls in the Netherlands in 1764, and in 1998, it was found attached to buoys off the Belgian coast. It was first observed in Western Australia in 1949 and arrived on the east coast of Australia by 1990. It is also found on reefs, bedrock, boulders, and timber structures down to about 40 m (130 ft) deep.

== Biology ==
Like other acorn barnacles, M. tintinnabulum is a filter feeder. Specially adapted legs called cirri are extended through the opening at the top of the shell and are waved about at right angles to the flow of water past the shell. Food particles are caught by these, and the cirri are periodically withdrawn into the shell and the food scraped off.

Eggs of M. tintinnabulum are fertilized internally by sperm from another barnacle nearby and start to develop into larvae within a few days. These are planktonic and disperse in the water column. They pass through six naupliar stages and one cypris larval stage before settling on the seabed, undergoing metamorphosis and developing into juveniles. These cement themselves to the substrate and remain sessile for the rest of their lives.

== Ecology ==
Megabalanus tintinnabulum is found at or below the low-tide mark in the littoral zone and is part of the fouling community. It is found on the hulls of ships and on man-made structures in ports. It has a stable population structure and low mortality rate, and is a long-lived species. In the South China Sea, molluscs and acorn barnacles, including Megabalanus tintinnabulum, were primary foulers of hulls and other man-made structures and that their presence allowed algae, hydrozoans, and bryozoans to take hold.

Empty but still attached shells of M. tintinnabulum are sometimes occupied by the tessellated blenny (Hypsoblennius invemar). It not only uses a shell for a refuge, but the male also broods the fish's eggs inside.
