= List of islets in the Azores =

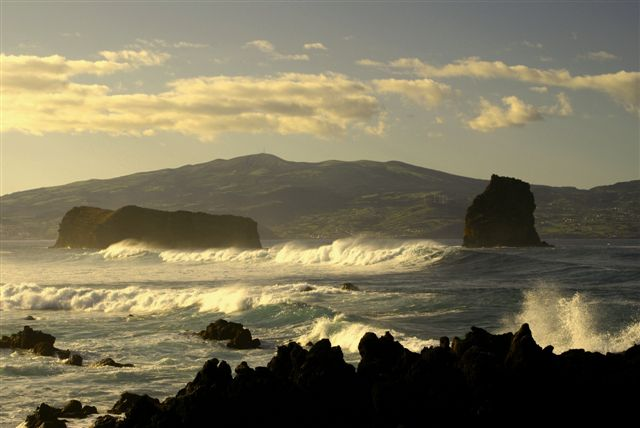
The twin Madalena Islets

The following is a list of the prominent islets or volcanic stacks in the archipelago of the Azores:

== Corvo ==
- Ilhéu de Lagoinhas

== Flores ==
- Ilhéu Maria Vaz
- Ilhéu do Monchique
- Ilhéu Alagado

== Graciosa ==
- Ilhéu da Praia
- Ilhéu de Baixo
- Ilhéu da Baleia
- Ilhéu da Gaivota
- Ilhéu do Navio
- Ilhéus do Barro Vermelho
- Ilhéus da Ponta da Barca

== Pico ==
- Ilhéus da Madalena
- Ilhéu Delgado
- Ilhéu Escamirro
- Ilhéu Pesqueiro
- Ilhéu das Moças

== São Jorge ==
- Ilhéus dos Rosais
- Ilhéu do Topo

== São Miguel ==
- Ilha Sabrina (historic)
- Ilhéus dos Mosteiros
- Ilhéu de Vila Franca
- Ilhéu de Rosto de Cão

== Santa Maria ==
- Ilhéu da Vila
- Ilhéu de Lagoinhas
- Ilhéus das Formigas

== Terceira ==
- Ilhéus das Cabras
- Fradinhos
- Ilhéu do Norte
