= Transmaçor =

Ferry operator in the Azores

- Native name: Transmaçor – Transportes Marítimos Açorianos, Lda
- Type: Public
- Industry: Transport
- Predecessors: Empresa das Lanchas do Pico, Lda; Empresa Açoriana de Transportes Marítimos, Lda; Transcanal-Transportes Marítimos do Canal, Ld.a
- Founded: December 22, 1987 Horta (Azores), Portugal
- Fate: Merged with Atlânticoline
- Headquarters: Horta, Portugal
- Number of locations: 3
- Area served: Central Group
- Owner: Regional Government, Empresa Açoriana de Transportes Marítimos, Lda.

Transmaçor (Portuguese: Transmaçor – Transportes Marítimos Açorianos, Lda) was a sea transport/ferry operator in the Central Group of islands of the Azores, headquartered in the city of Horta, on the island of Faial.

== History ==
Transmaçor was founded on 22 December 1987, from the merging of smaller operators that operated within the waters of the central group of Azorean islands. These included the Empresa das Lanchas do Pico, Lda., operator of the inter-island launches Espalamaca and Calheta; Empresa Açoriana de Transportes Marítimos, Lda, that operated the yacht Terra Alta; and Transcanal – Transportes Marítimos do Canal, Lda, owners of the traditional seagoing launches Picaroto and Manuel José.

Transmaçor operated with 80% social equity in the operation, while the regional government (in order to secure inter-island passage) held the remaining common shares.

In 2011, the Regional Government of the obtained 88.37% of the common shares, with the remaining 11.63% stake taken by Empresa Açoriana de Transportes Marítimos, Lda.

On 22 November 2012, the regional secretary for Tourism and Transport, Vítor Fraga, indicated the need to integrate and coordinate inter-island travel between land, air and maritime traffic, resulting in an Integrated Plan for Transport (Portuguese: Plano Integrado de Transportes). Fraga indicated that it was necessary to "rationalize the [maritime] system, evolving into an integrated management of Atlânticoline and Transmaçor, by fusion, that permitted the desired economies of scale and a better optimization of operational results", noting that "on concluding, the construction of two new mixed-transport vessels for passengers and vehicles" was necessary (then in construction).

By the beginning of 2014, the proposed merger of the inter-island operators had not occurred. While maintaining the brand Atlanticoline, the Government of the Azores would reform the new entity at the end of the mandate of the old Atlanticoline administrative council on 31 December 2013, but maintain the daily operation independent. The arrival of the two new RORO-enabled mixed-use vessels Gilberto Mariano and Mestre Simão at the end of the summer, in the colours of Atlanticoline did not indicate a separate-but-equal operation of the new operator.

== Operations ==
The ferry service concentrated on inter-island travel between the five islands of the Central Group, in the Azores, maintaining regular service through its launches MV Cruzeiro das Ilhas, MV Cruzeiro do Canal, MV Expresso do Triângulo and MV Expresso das Ilhas.

- Cruzeiro das Ilhas; constructed by Estaleiros de São Jacinto in Aveiro (1986), was originally launched as Cruzeiro do Canal, and began operations in March 1986. In January 1988, it began operations under Transmaçor, securing connections to five islands in the Central Group, with its capacity for 208 passengers and space for two hammocks (for transporting the injured or sick);
- Cruzeiro do Canal; also constructed by Estaleiros de São Jacinto, at the same time that Ilhas was laid down, the boat was originally christened as Cruzeiro das Ilhas and started operating in Azorean water in July 1987. In January 1988, it began operating for Transmaçor, securing connections between Horta and Madalena, with a capacity for 244 passengers and two hammocks;
- Expresso do Triãngulo, constructed by the Norwegian Estaleiros Fjellstrand (owned by Siturjorense, SA) in Omastrand (1983), the two-hul catamaran began operating in the Azores in August 2001. By December 2001, it was in the Transmaçor fleet securing links between the islands of Faial, Pico and São Jorge, the Islands of the Triangle, with its capacity for 160 passengers;
- Expresso das Ilhas, twin-sister to Triânglo, nonetheless, the ship was constructed by Estaleiros Marinteknik Verkstads AB, a Swedish company (May 1990) and began operating in the Azores in September 2003, securing vital interland connections between the five islands of the Central Group in the important summer season, with its capacity for 224 passengers.

This modest fleet secured inter-island service between Faial, Pico and Island, connecting daily service throughout the year (baring meteorological conditions):

- In the Faial-Pico Channel between the ports of Horta and Madalena, where 5–7 daily origin-destination pairs connected the terminal port of Santa Cruz (Horta) with the Cais da Madalena (Madalena);
- In the Triangle group of islands (Faial, Pico and São Jorge) two daily connections existed between Cais de Santa Cruz, Cais do Pico (in São Roque do Pico) and port of Velas.
- During the months of June and September the port of Calheta received two connections weekly.
