= Mosteiros =

Mosteiros, Portuguese for monasteries, may refer to the following places:

== Cape Verde ==
- Mosteiros, Cape Verde, a town on the island of Fogo
- Mosteiros, Cape Verde (municipality), a municipality on the island of Fogo

== Portugal ==
- Mosteiros (Ponta Delgada), a civil parish in the municipality of Ponta Delgada, Azores
- Mosteiros Islets, a group of islets off the coast of the civil parish of Mosteiros (not to be confused with the islet in Príncipe mentioned below)
- Mosteiros, a civil parish in the municipality of Arronches

== São Tomé and Príncipe ==
- Ilhéu dos Mosteiros, an islet near Príncipe

== See also ==
- Mosteiro (disambiguation)
