= Uninhabited island =

Island without human residents

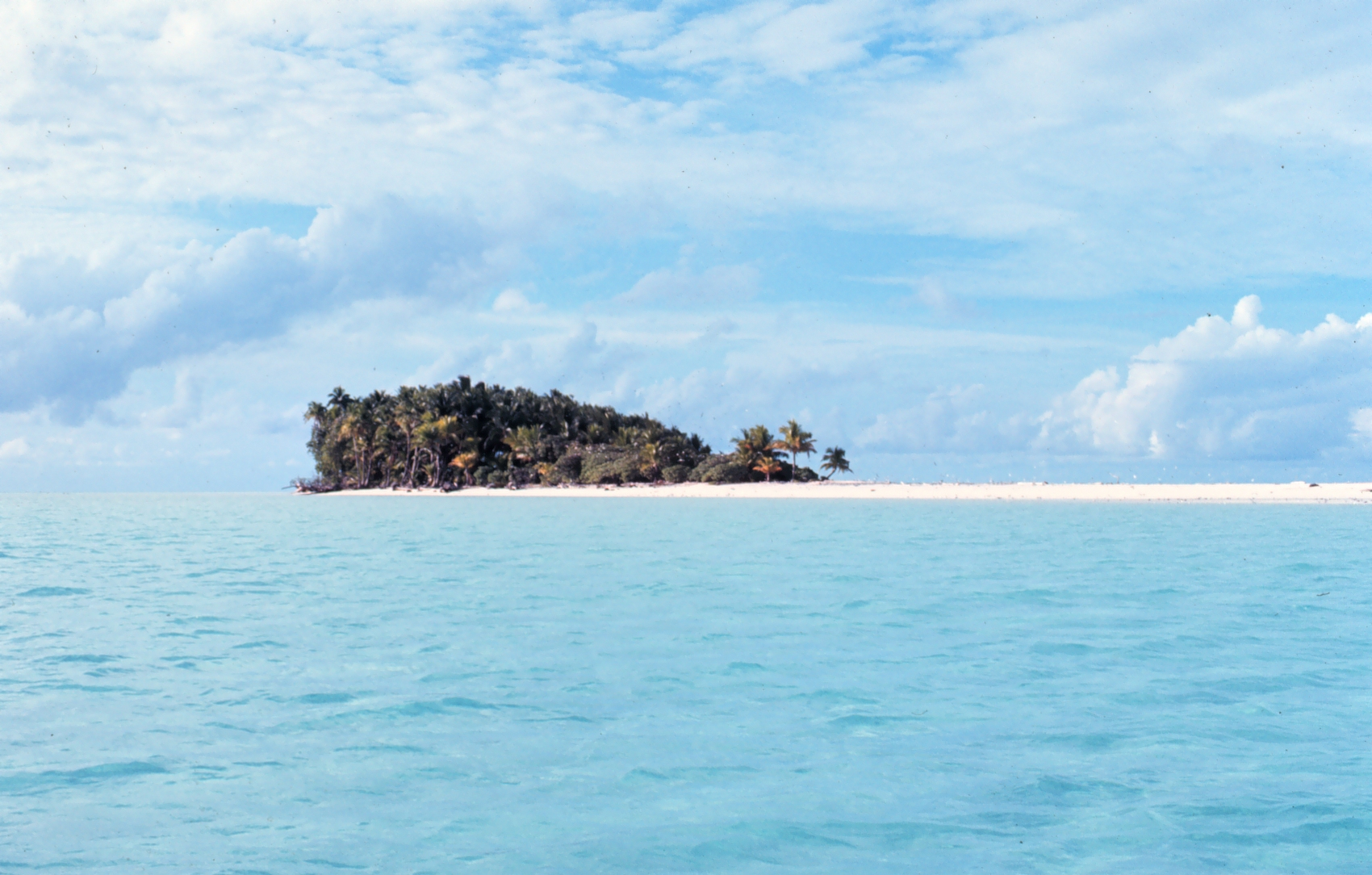
Helen Reef, Palau

An uninhabited island, desert island, or deserted island, is an island, islet, or atoll which lacks permanent human population. Uninhabited islands are often depicted in films or stories about shipwrecked people, and are also used as stereotypes for the idea of "paradise". Some uninhabited islands are protected as nature reserves, and some are privately owned. Devon Island in Canada's far north is the largest uninhabited island in the world.

Small coral atolls or islands usually have no source of fresh water, but occasionally a freshwater lens can be reached with a well.

== Terminology ==
Uninhabited islands are sometimes also called "deserted islands" or "desert islands". In the latter, the adjective desert connotes not desert climate conditions, but rather "desolate and sparsely occupied or unoccupied". The word desert has been "formerly applied more widely to any wild, uninhabited region, including forest-land", and it is this archaic meaning that appears in the phrase "desert island".

The term "desert island" is also commonly used figuratively to refer to objects or behavior in conditions of social isolation and limited material means. Behavior on a desert island is a common thought experiment, for example, "desert island morality".

== Biodiversity ==
Desert islands are partly sheltered from humans, making them havens for a number of fragile wildlife species such as sea turtles and ground-nesting seabirds. Many species of seabirds use them as stopovers on their way or especially for nesting, taking advantage of the (supposed) absence of terrestrial predators such as cats or rats.

However, tons of waste from far away countries accumulate on their beaches from the sea, and the absence of surveillance also makes them desirable spots for poachers of protected species.

== Selected uninhabited islands ==
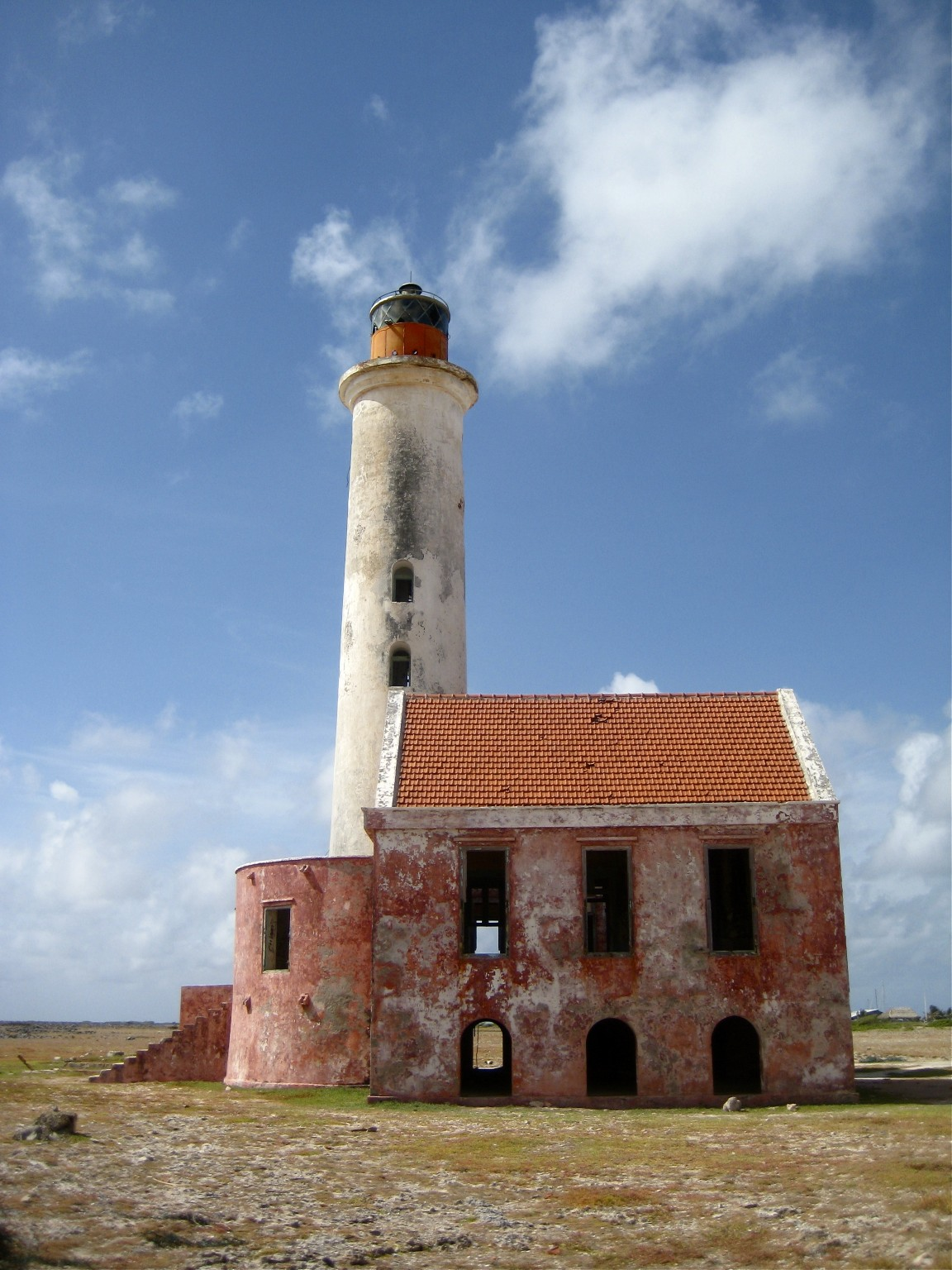
The abandoned lighthouse at Klein Curaçao

- Amatignak Island, southernmost point of Alaska, US
- Appat Island, Greenland
- ʻAta, the southernmost island of the Kingdom of Tonga
- Auckland Islands in the South Pacific, which are part of New Zealand
- Astola Island, Pakistan
- A majority of the Barra Isles, the Outer Hebrides, Scotland. The most famous of these is Barra Head.
- Blasket Islands in County Kerry, Ireland
- Ball's Pyramid, a tall volcanic mountain located close to Lord Howe Island in the South Pacific
- Binlang Islet, Taiwan
- Most of the Canadian Arctic Archipelago
- Bouvet Island in the South Atlantic, the world's most remote island
- Caquorobert, Guernsey
- Clipperton Island, a Pacific island of France
- Coral Sea Islands off the northeastern coast of Australia
- De Long Islands in the Arctic Ocean, part of Russia
- Desertas Islands, Portugal
- Devon Island, the largest uninhabited island in the world at 55,247 km^{2}
- Gotska Sandön, Sweden
- Heard Island and McDonald Islands, Australia
- Many islands within the waters of Hong Kong, with the largest being Double Island
- Ilha da Queimada Grande "Snake Island", Brazil
- Isle Royale in Lake Superior
- Jarvis Island, United States
- Kaffeklubben Island, Greenland, the northernmost undisputed point of land on Earth
- Keros, Rineia, and other small islands off the coast of Greece
- Žut and other islands off the coast of Croatia
- Kermadec Islands, part of New Zealand
- Korzhin Island in Lake Balkhash
- Klein Curaçao, Curaçao
- Lampione, Sicily
- Lítla Dímun, Faroe Islands
- Luci Island in Xiuyu District, Putian, Fujian, China
- Oeno Island (Pitcairn Islands, British Overseas Territories)
- Ogurchinsky Island in the Caspian Sea
- Rat Islands, a volcanic island in the Aleutian Islands
- Santa Luzia, Cape Verde
- Savage Islands, Portugal
- Severny Island, Russia
- Shag Rocks (South Georgia)
- Surtsey, a volcanic island located south of Iceland
- Tetepare Island, the largest uninhabited island in the South Pacific
- Topo Islet, Azores, Portugal
- Most of the United States Minor Outlying Islands, such as Johnston Atoll, Wake Island and Midway Atoll. Palmyra Atoll has no permanent residents but it has private landholdings that are continuously occupied by temporary residents.
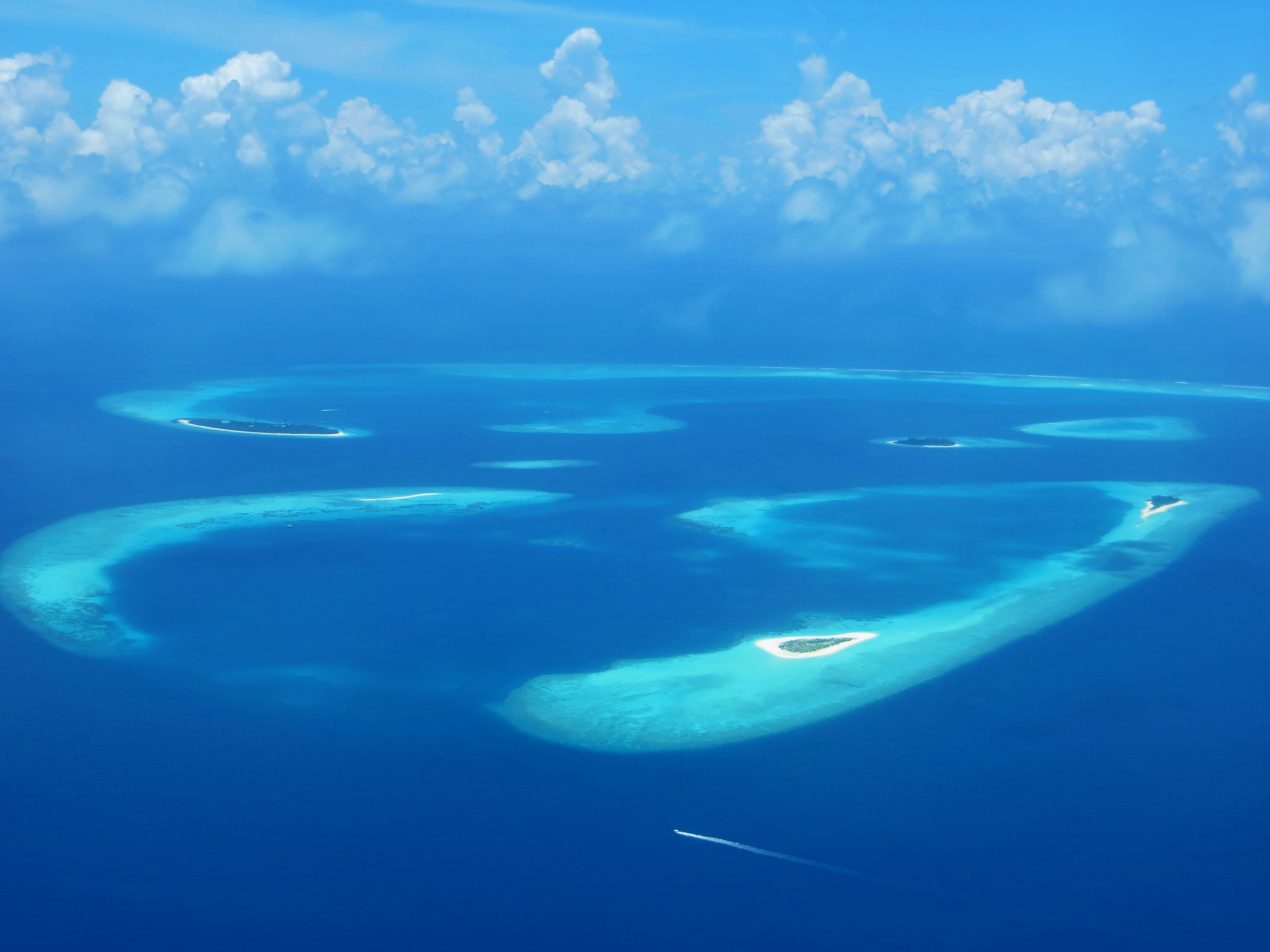
Aerial view of Baa Atoll, Maldives

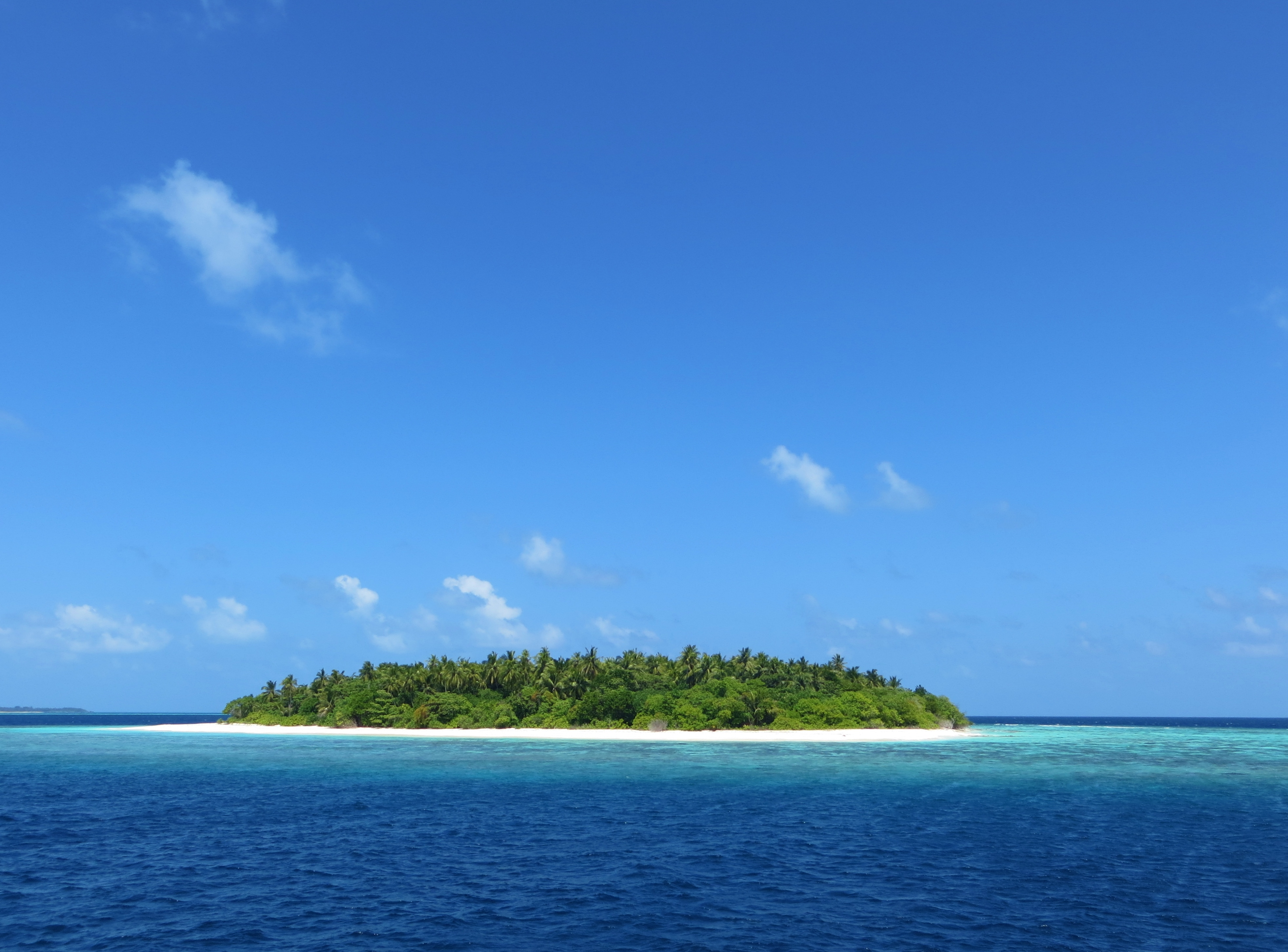
Desert island in the Baa Atoll

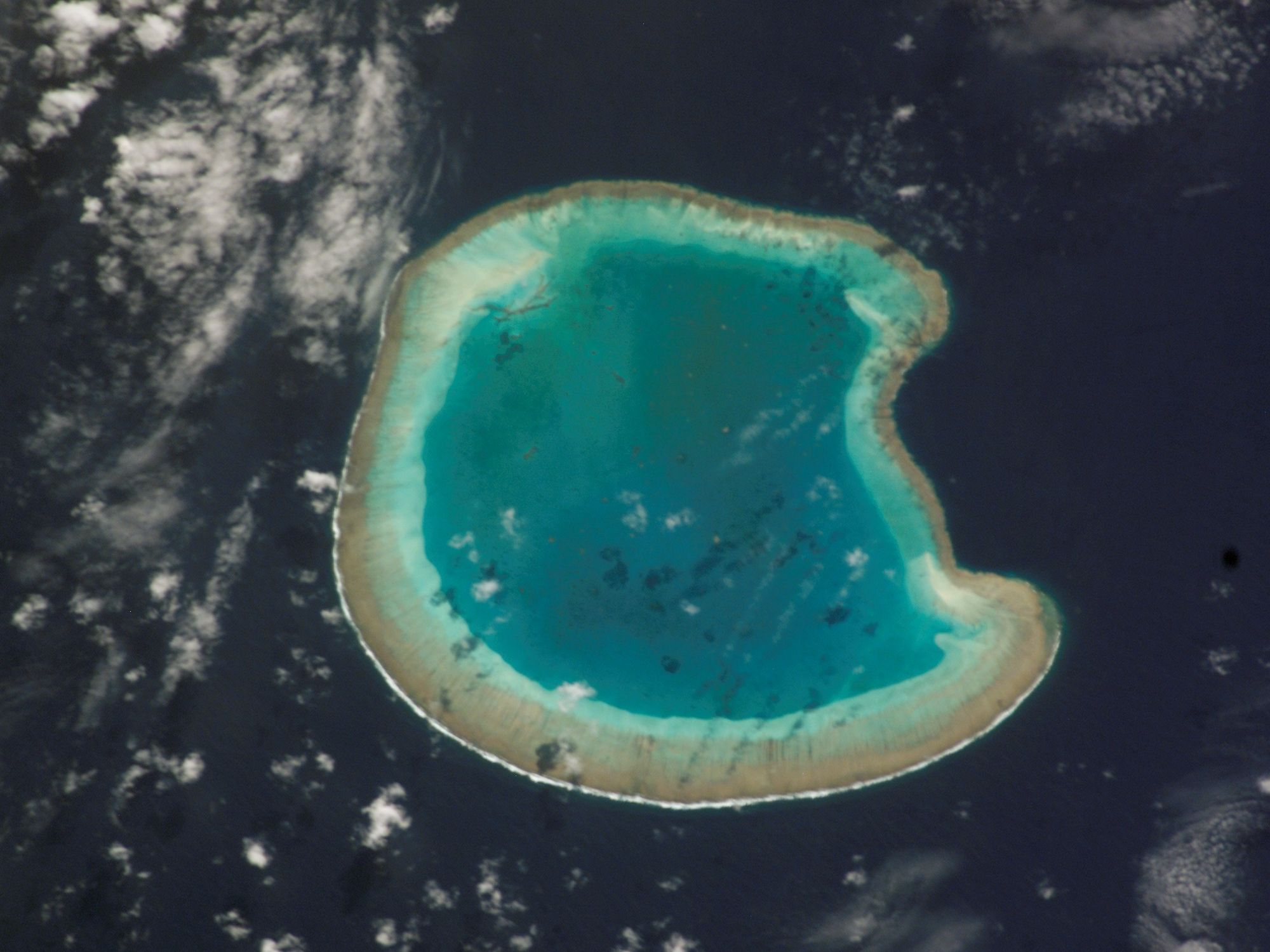
The French atoll of Bassas da India in the Mozambique Channel

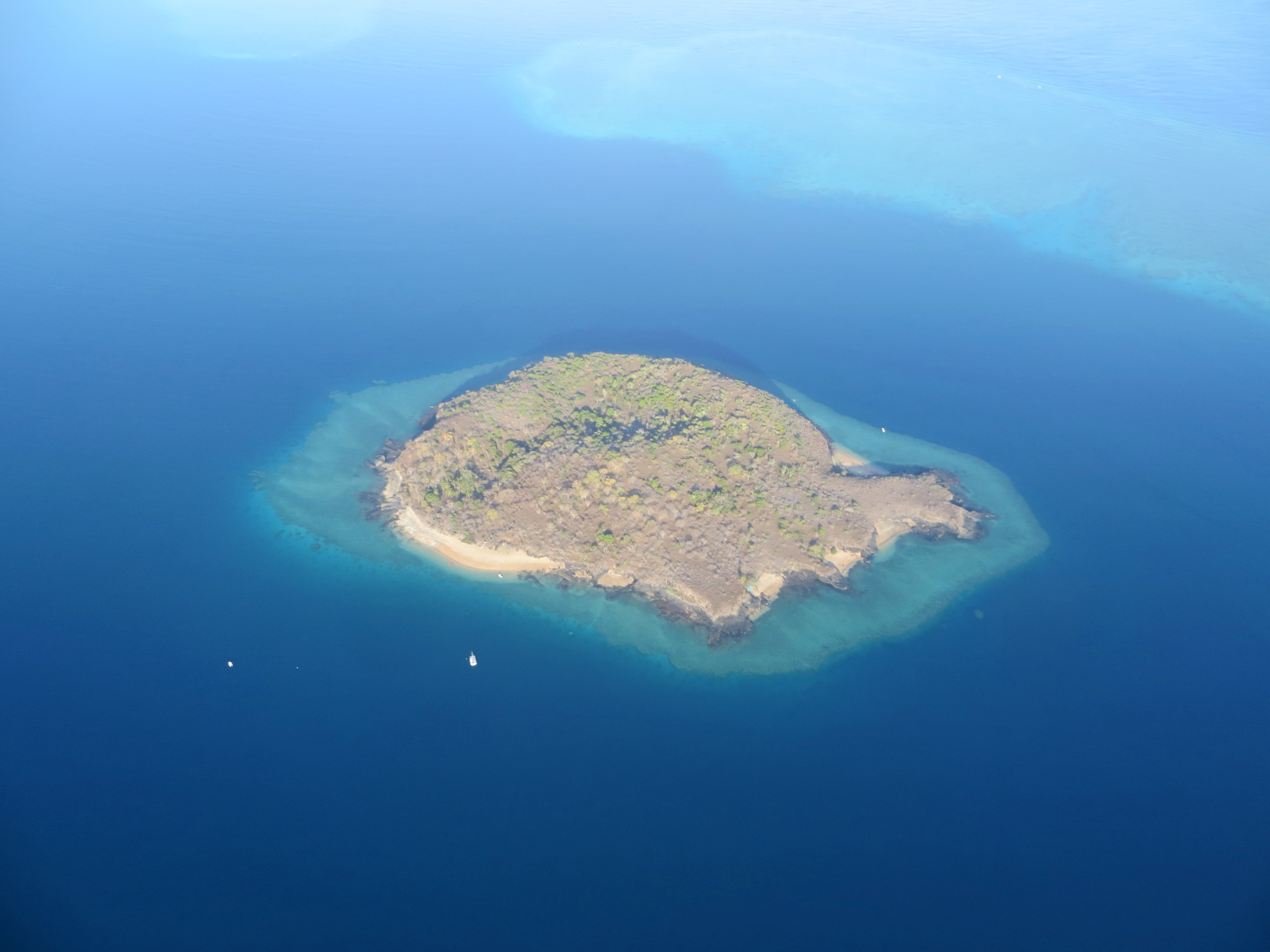
Chissioua Bandrélé, Mayotte

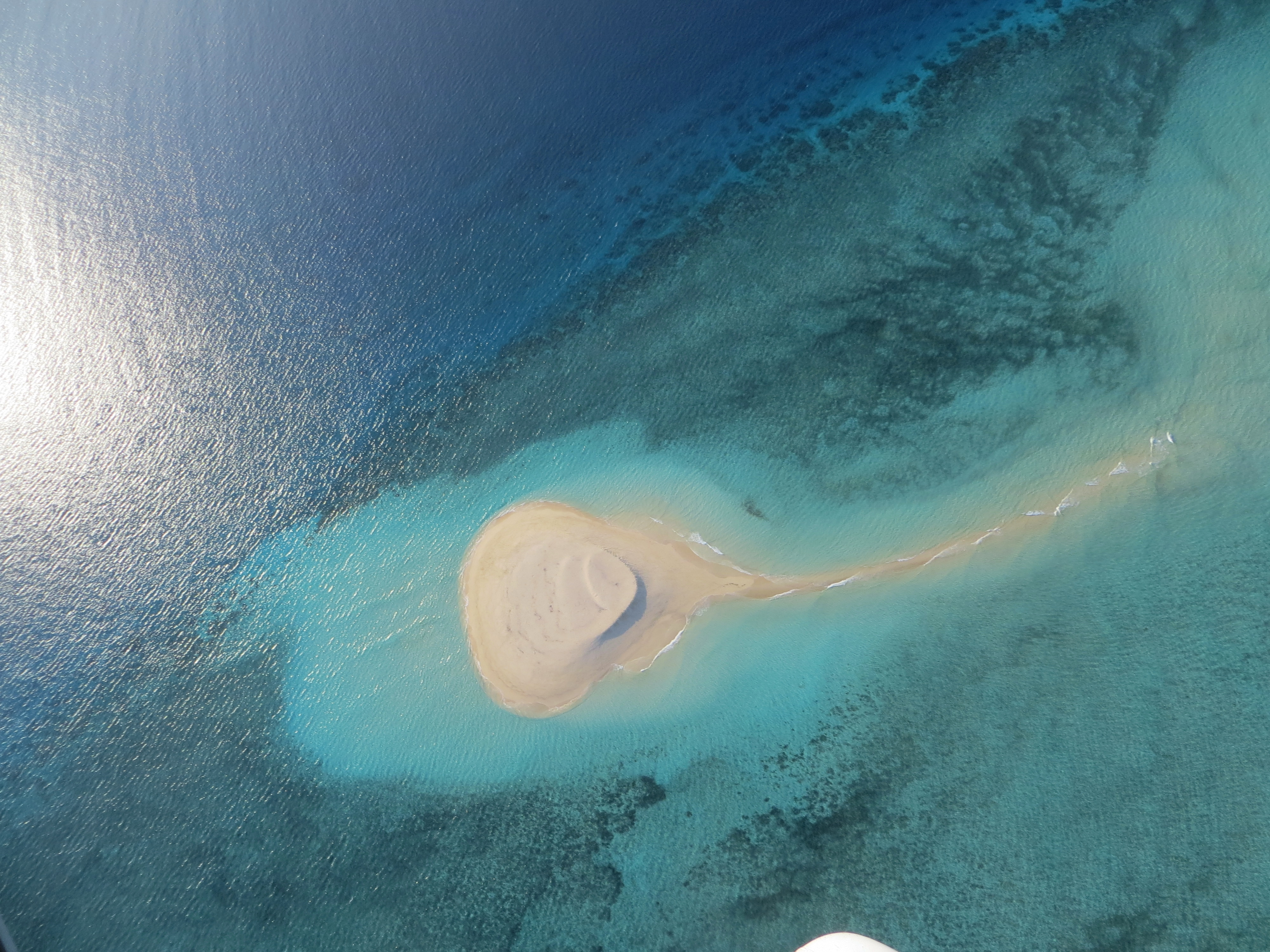
Mtsanga Tsoholé, Mayotte

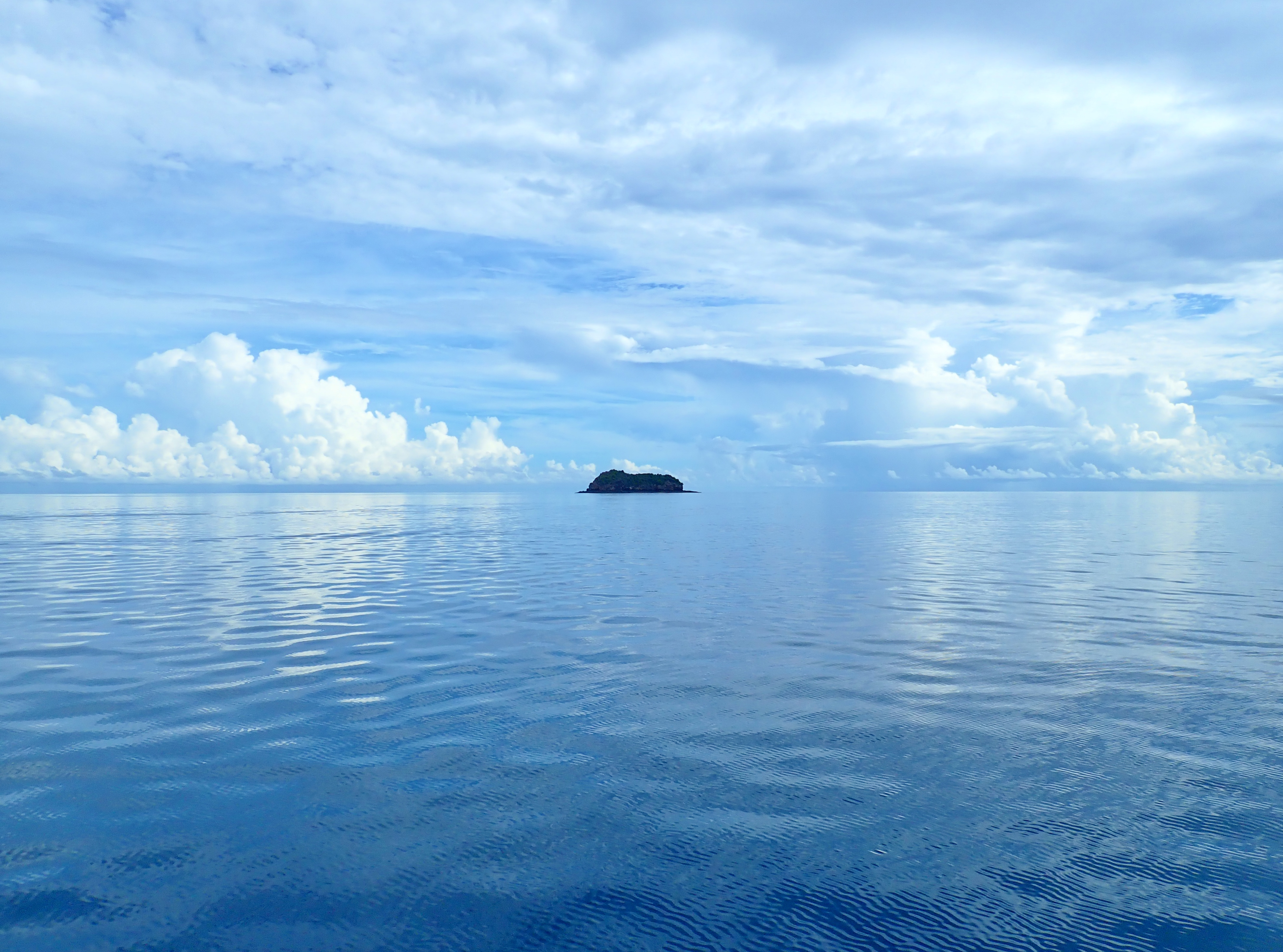
Gombé Ndroumé, Mayotte

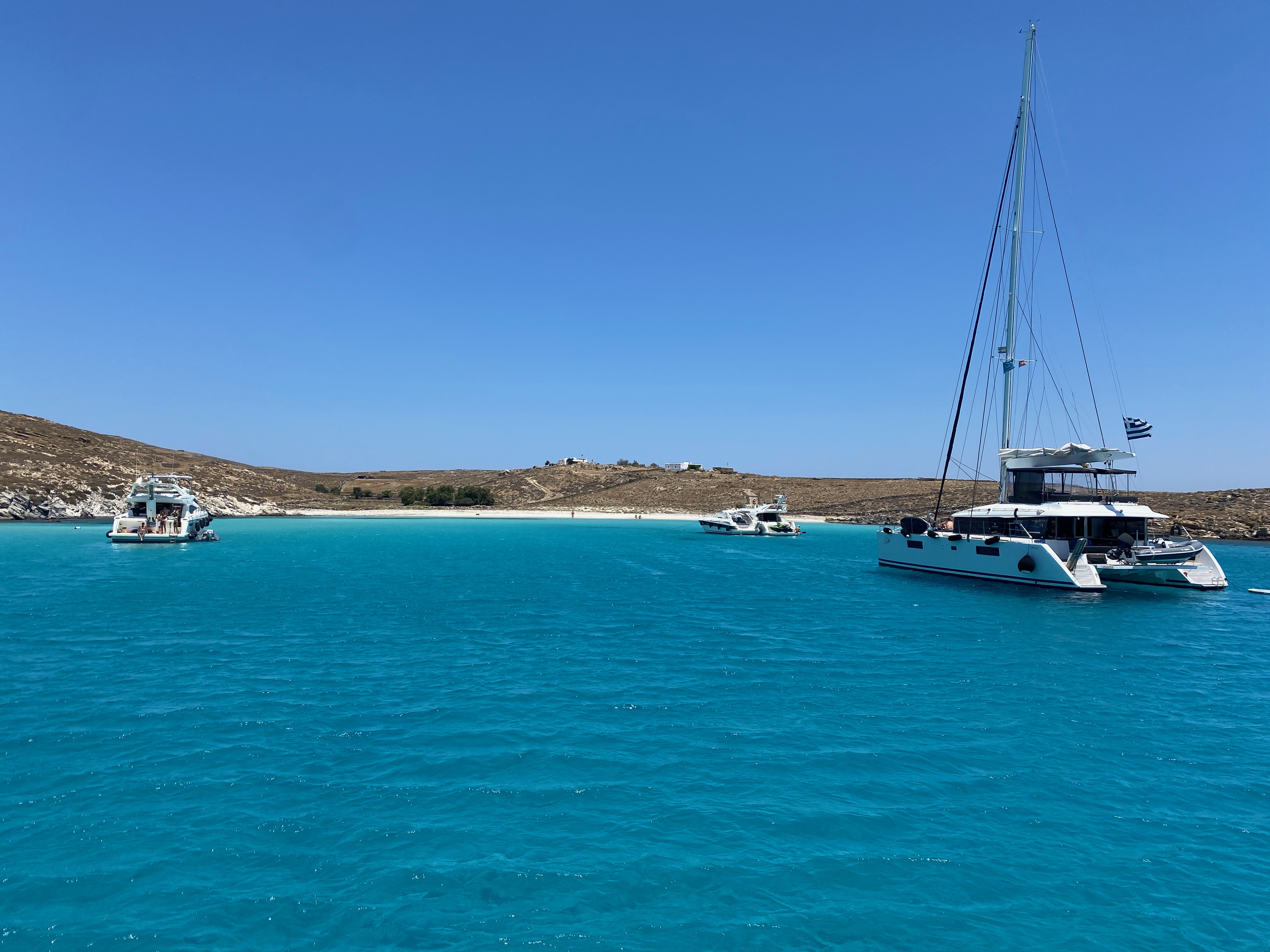
Yachts docked in a bay at Rineia, Greece

== Largest uninhabited islands ==
Rank	Area Rank	Island	Area (km^{2})	Area (sq mi)	Country/Countries	Coordinates
1	27	Devon Island (Tallurutit)	55,247	21,331	Canada (Nunavut)	75°08′N 87°51′W
2	28	Alexander Island (Isla Alejandro I)	49,070	18,950	None (Antarctic territorial claims by Argentina, Chile, and the United Kingdom)	71°00′S 70°00′W
3	30	Severny Island (Severnyy Ostrov)	48,904	18,882	Russia (Arkhangelsk Oblast)	75°30′N 60°00′E
4	31	Berkner Island (Isla Berkner)	44,000	17,000	None (Antarctic territorial claims by Argentina and the United Kingdom)	79°30′S 47°30′W
5	32	Axel Heiberg Island (Umingmat Nunaat)	43,178	16,671	Canada (Nunavut)	79°26′N 90°46′W
6	33	Melville Island (Ilulliq)	42,149	16,274	Canada (Northwest Territories and Nunavut)	75°30′N 111°30′W
7	40	Prince of Wales Island (Kinngailak)	33,339	12,872	Canada (Nunavut)	72°40′N 99°00′W
8	46	Somerset Island (Kuuganajuk)	24,786	9,570	Canada (Nunavut)	73°15′N 93°30′W
9	47	Kotelny Island (Olgujdaah Aryy)	24,000	9,300	Russia (Sakha Republic)	75°20′N 141°00′E
10	54	Bathurst Island	16,042	6,194	Canada (Nunavut)	75°46′N 99°47′W
11	55	Prince Patrick Island	15,848	6,119	Canada (Northwest Territories)	76°45′N 119°30′W
12	56	Thurston Island	15,700	6,100	None	72°6′S 99°0′W
13	57	Nordaustlandet	14,467	5,586	Norway (Svalbard)	79°48′N 22°24′E
14	59	October Revolution Island	14,170	5,470	Russia (Krasnoyarsk Krai)	79°30′N 97°00′E
15	68	Ellef Ringnes Island	11,295	4,361	Canada (Nunavut)	78°30′N 102°15′W
16	69	Bolshevik Island	11,270	4,350	Russia (Krasnoyarsk Krai)	78°38′N 102°29′E
17	71	Bylot Island	11,067	4,273	Canada (Nunavut)	73°16′N 78°30′W
18	77	Prince Charles Island	9,521	3,676	Canada (Nunavut)	67°47′N 76°12′W
19	82	Komsomolets Island	9,006	3,477	Russia (Krasnoyarsk Krai)	80°29′N 94°59′E
20	85	Carney Island	8,500	3,300	None	73°57′S 121°00′W
21	107	Coats Island	5,498	2,123	Canada (Nunavut)	62°35′N 82°45′W
22	111	Amund Ringnes Island	5,255	2,029	Canada (Nunavut)	78°20′N 96°25′W

Most of the largest uninhabited islands are well within the Arctic or Antarctic circles, indicating that the reason for their desertedness is the freezing climate.

== In literature and popular culture ==
The first known novels to be set on a desert island were Hayy ibn Yaqdhan written by Ibn Tufail (1105–1185), followed by Theologus Autodidactus written by Ibn al-Nafis (1213–1288). The protagonists in both (Hayy in Hayy ibn Yaqdhan and Kamil in Theologus Autodidactus) are feral children living in seclusion on a deserted island, until they eventually come in contact with castaways from the outside world who are stranded on the island. The story of Theologus Autodidactus, however, extends beyond the deserted island setting when the castaways take Kamil back to civilization with them.

William Shakespeare's 1610–11 play, The Tempest, uses the idea of being stranded on a desert island as a pretext for the action of the play. Prospero and his daughter Miranda are set adrift by Prospero's treacherous brother Antonio, seeking to become Duke of Milan, and Prospero in turn shipwrecks his brother and other men of sin onto the island.

The Isle of Pines by Henry Neville, published in 1668 is an account of a man shipwrecked on a desert island with three women. It's a mixture of satire and fantasy.

A Latin translation of Ibn Tufail's Hayy ibn Yaqdhan appeared in 1671, prepared by Edward Pococke the Younger, followed by an English translation by Simon Ockley in 1708, as well as German and Dutch translations. In the late 17th century, Hayy ibn Yaqdhan inspired Robert Boyle, an acquaintance of Pococke, to write his own philosophical novel set on a deserted island, The Aspiring Naturalist. Ibn al-Nafis' Theologus Autodidactus was also eventually translated into English in the early 20th century.

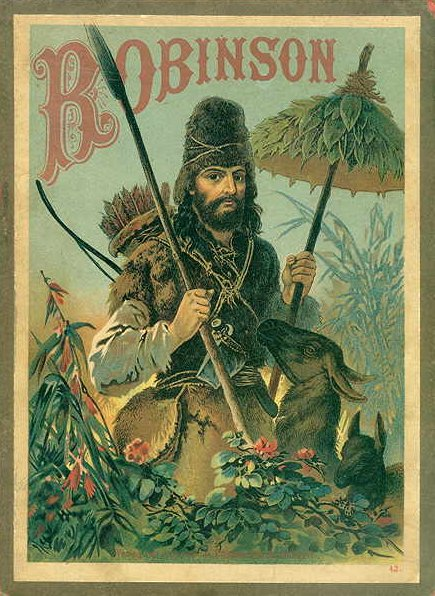
Robinson Crusoe in an 1887 German illustration

Published in 1719, Daniel Defoe's novel Robinson Crusoe, about a castaway on a desert island, has spawned so many imitations in film, television and radio that its name was used to define a genre, Robinsonade. The novel features Man Friday, Crusoe's personal assistant. It is likely that Defoe took inspiration for Crusoe from a Scottish sailor named Alexander Selkirk, who was rescued in 1709 after four years on the otherwise uninhabited Juan Fernández Islands; Defoe usually made use of current events for his plots. It is also likely that he was inspired by the Latin or English translations of Ibn Tufail's Hayy ibn Yaqdhan.

Noel Paul Stookey wrote a song about living on a desert island called "On a Desert Island (With You in My Dreams)" on Peter, Paul & Mary's 1965 album See What Tomorrow Brings.

Tom Neale was a New Zealander who voluntarily spent 16 years in three sessions in the 1950s and 1960s living alone on the island of Suwarrow in the Northern Cook Islands group. His time there is documented in his autobiography, An Island to Oneself.

In the popular conception, such islands are often located in the Pacific, tropical, uninhabited and usually uncharted. They are remote locales that offer escape and force people marooned or stranded as castaways to become self-sufficient and essentially create a new society. This society can either be utopian, based on an ingenious re-creation of society's comforts (as in Swiss Family Robinson and, in a humorous form, Gilligan's Island) or a regression into savagery (the major theme of both Lord of the Flies and The Beach).

In Kensuke's Kingdom, both the book and the film, a boy, Michael, is swept overboard during a storm in the Pacific Ocean while sailing with his family. He washes ashore on an island, where he meets Kensuke, a Japanese Navy sailor from World War II, who washed ashore in the last days of the war. Although Michael is rescued, Kensuke stays on the island to defend its wildlife, especially orangutans, from poachers.

Desert island jokes are also a hugely popular image for gag cartoons, the island being conventionally depicted as just a few yards across with a single palm tree (probably due to the visual constraints of the medium). 17 such cartoons appeared in The New Yorker in 1957 alone.

A special variation of the desert island theme appears in H. G. Wells's The War in the Air. As part of the cataclysmic global war depicted, the bridges linking Goat Island in the middle of the Niagara Falls to the mainland are cut, and with civilization fast breaking down a few survivors stranded on the island cannot expect rescue and must rely on their own resources—embarking on a grim life-and-death struggle.

The top "dream vacation" for heterosexual men surveyed by Psychology Today was "marooned on a tropical island with several members of the opposite sex".

== Historical castaways ==
=== Essex ===
In 1820, the crew of the American whaler Essex spent time on uninhabited British Henderson Island. There they gorged on birds, fish, and vegetation and found a small freshwater spring. After one week, they had depleted the island's resources and most of the crew left on three whaleboats, while three of the men decided to remain on the island and survived there for four months until their rescue.

=== Strathmore ===
Survivors of the British Strathmore survived for seven months at a small island of the French Crozet Islands from 1875 to 1876. They survived by eating eggs and flesh of geese, albatrosses and other seabirds. They also ate root vegetables and fish. The survival was the input for among others the book Survival on the Crozet Islands: The Wreck of the Strathmore in 1875.

== See also ==
- Bonin Islands, whose name derives from the Japanese for 'desert island'
- Castaway depot
- Desert Island Discs
- List of islands by population
- List of uninhabited regions
- Shipwreck, Marooning, Exile, & Castaway
