= MV Terra Alta =

History
- Name: Terra Alta
- Owner: Transmaçor
- Operator: 1944–1988: EATM; 1988–2000: Transmaçor
- Port of registry: Portugal Horta
- Builder: Manuel Joaquim Melo
- Laid down: 1946
- Launched: 21 April 1948
- Christened: 22 April 1948
- Completed: 1947
- Acquired: 11 April 1949
- Maiden voyage: 25 April 1948
- In service: 29 April 1946
- Out of service: 1995
- Identification: H-24-TL
- Fate: Dismantled

General characteristics
- Tonnage: 154.73 GT
- Length: 30.33 m (99.5 ft)
- Beam: 5.58 m (18.3 ft)
- Draught: 2.83 m (9.3 ft)
- Installed power: 365 horsepower
- Propulsion: 2 Cummins
- Crew: 5

The Terra Alta was a Portuguese motor yacht, constructed in the shipyards of Santo Amaro, the municipality of São Roque do Pico. It was a major ship that transported passenger and cargo in the waters of the central group of islands in the archipelago of the Azores, transformed from private hands into the fleet of Transmaçor. With a storied history, it had several incidents throughout the late 20th century, that eventually lead to it being broken-up and destroyed by the beginning of the 21st century.

== History ==
On 20 April 1946, José Serpa Diogo ordered from Manuel Joaquim Melo (a project of the Nunes brothers, Manuel Inácio and António Nunes) in Santo Amaro the construction of the ship Terra Alta for 1400 contos. In 1947, H-24-TL was launched, with a 30.33 metres (99.5 ft) length, 5.58 metres (18.3 ft) beam 2.83 metres (9.3 ft) draught and 154.73 tonnes (341,100 lb) gross weight, and with two 140 horsepower Alfa Romeo motors, permitting it to reach 12 miles per hour (19 km/h). The original project was criticized, principally due to the boat being excessively straight; one of the boatbuilders at the time (Manuel Bento, baptized Manuel António Furtado Simas) opined that the boat should have been 3–3.5 feet (0.91–1.07 m) wider. Another problem was the motors installed were below the recommended horsepower needed to ply the waters of the central group, requiring the motors to be run excessively and increasing the possibility of damage. In its first voyage between São Miguel and Terceira, the boat was stopped for various hours.

The day after its launch, the ship arrived in Horta, covered in flags and was celebrated by its locals. The newspapers of the period, O Telegrafo and Correio da Horta referred to Terra Alta as a modern ship, that transported 100 passengers, "magnificently installed because it was equipped with bunk beds for 16 people and upholstered benches for anyone and had a bar restaurant to provide food and drinks". The ship was blessed by Father Manuel Silveria Brasil and was christened with a bottle of Pico wine, by Maria Manuela de Melo Carvalho, daughter of the Commandane Melo de Carvelo, then captain of the Port of Horta. Melo Carvalho then presented an inscription stone, inscribed with the words "May God guide you". In Horta, Manuel Emílio dos Santos was responsible for further installation of the remainder of the fixtures, while the technicians at Fayal Coal (led by Manuel E. da Costa) installed the motors.

On 29 April 1948, the Terra Alta began inter-island service, delivery 67 passengers to Horta, and owing to the festival of Senhor Santo Cristo dos Milagres, it transported 200 Terceirense to Ponta Delgada for the festival. On arriving in Terceira, the shipped was met with fanfare, including band Fanfarra Operária, flag-waving and a small cortege of ships from Monte Brasil until its anchorage. With a reception of many notables and invited, the captain was met by the Civil Governor and many of the principal authorities of Angra.

Three years later, on 11 April 1949, José Diogo sold the ship to the Empresa Açoriana de Transportes Marítimos for the original purchase value.

In 1952, the Alfa Romeo motors were substituted for two 102 horsepower Deutz variants, and later (in 1960), for 150 horsepower Deutz motors.

On 8 September 1955, after a stopover at the port of Velas (with a destination to Cais do Pico and Horta), the Terra Alta made an incorrect manoeuvre that resulted in it returning to port, unloading passengers, before sinking at dock. After a rescue operation, it was towed to Horta, by the ship Cachalote and repaired.

In the 1960s, the Terra Alta hit ground along the north coast of Pico, and sunk at the port of Madalena.

On 21 July 1975, the ships suffered a fire while in the port of Horta, resulting in the damage to machine; the fire was rapidly fought by the Faialense fire-fighters and ships from Velas and bay of Velas.

In October 1979, its motors were substituted by two 365 horsepower Cummins.

In 1988 it was integrated into the fleet of Transmaçor and suffered further alterations. It returned to the Pico-Faial Channel as a passenger ship, but it safety became an issue, owing to cargo and excessive passengers on its decks.

Sent to Madalena in 1995, it effectively left service, and was dismantled on 3 June 2000 and burned.
