= Madalena Islets =

Islets in the Azores, Portugal

Native name: Ilhéus da Madalena Nickname: Ilhéu Deitado and Ilhéu em Pé
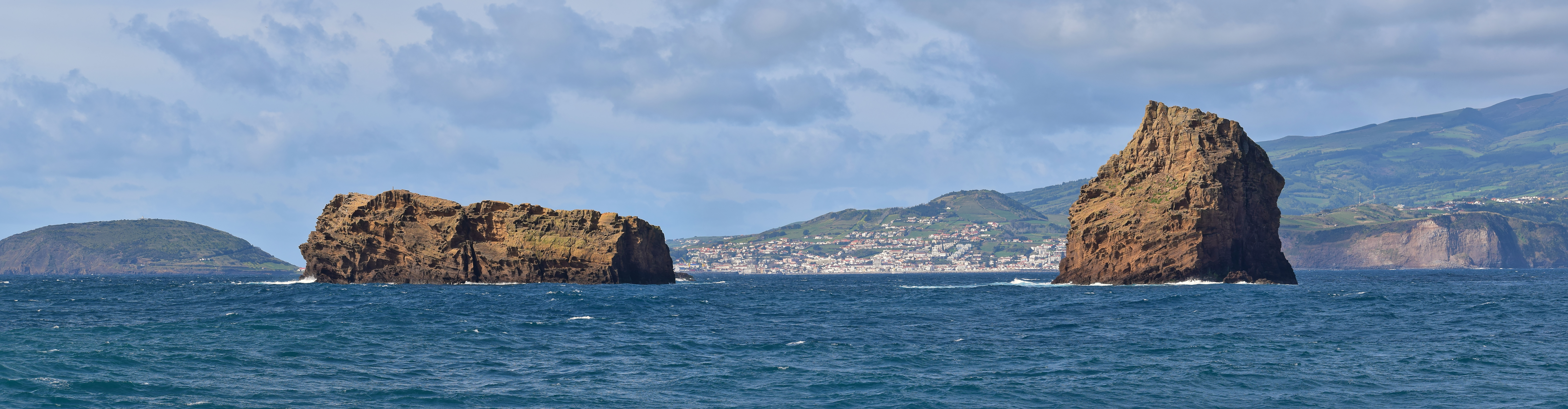
- The islets as seen from Pico, with Horta in the background.

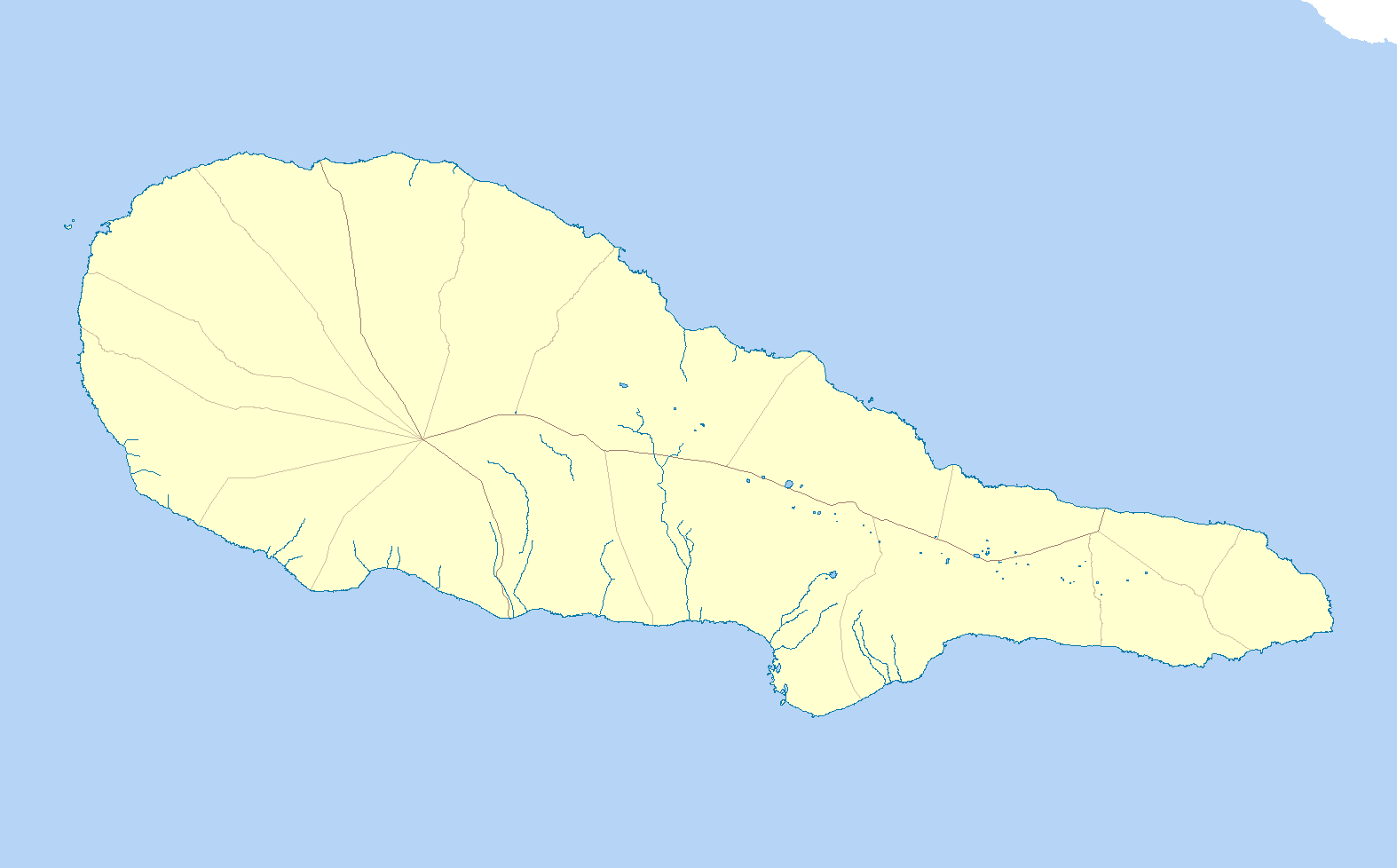
- Location of the islets off the coast of Pico

Geography
- Location: Atlantic Ocean
- Coordinates: 38°31′00″N 28°32′00″W

Administration
- Portugal
- Autonomous region: Azores

Demographics
- Population: uninhabited

The Madalena Islets (Portuguese: Ilhéus da Madalena) are two uninhabited islets located in the Faial-Pico Channel about 0.5 nautical miles (0.93 km; 0.58 mi) away from Madalena harbor, off the coast of the island of Pico in the Portuguese archipelago of the Azores. The islets are also visible from Horta, Faial, and from the ferries which travel regularly between Horta and Madalena. Locally, the shorter of the two islets is known as Ilhéu Deitado ("Lying Down" Islet), while the taller islet is known as Ilhéu em Pé ("Standing Up" Islet).

== Geography ==
The Madalena Islets are the exposed remains of a submarine volcano which have been eroded by the sea and seismic activity over the ages. The space between the two islets is the old volcanic crater formed of tuff rock and is approximately 20 metres (66 ft) deep. The rocks are composed mainly of compacted palagonite tuff. Surrounding waters include sandy clearings and areas of small sea-eroded rocks called calhau rolado ("rolled pebbles") in Portuguese.

Ilhéu Deitado is approximately 52 metres (171 ft) in height and Ilhéu em Pé is approximately 59 metres (194 ft) tall.

=== Biome ===
Terrestrial plants present on the islets include endemic Azorean flowering plants such as Spergularia azorica and vidália (Azorina vidalii). Aquatic plants growing in the waters around the islets include the brown alga Sphacelaria plumula, and the red algae Lithophyllum incrustans and Pterocladiophila capilacea.

Various marine birds shelter on the islets, including common tern, Cory's shearwater, Eurasian whimbrel, grey heron, Kentish plover, roseate tern, ruddy turnstone, and sanderling. The waters surrounding the islets are home to common bottlenose dolphins, Atlantic bonito, groupers, and needlefish.

Since June 1995 the Madalena Islets have been recognized as a protected Natura 2000 site by the European Environment Agency under the Habitats Directive. There are ongoing efforts to formally protect the islets locally as one of the protected areas of the Azores, thus far unsuccessful.

Experienced scuba divers may visit the islets, particularly the small bay between them. Divers should exercise immense caution leaving this protected bay due to the strong currents in the Faial-Pico Channel, and so as to avoid the ferries and other vessels plying the channel.
