= Faial-Pico Channel =

Coordinates: 38.54°N 28.57°W

- Canal Faial-Pico
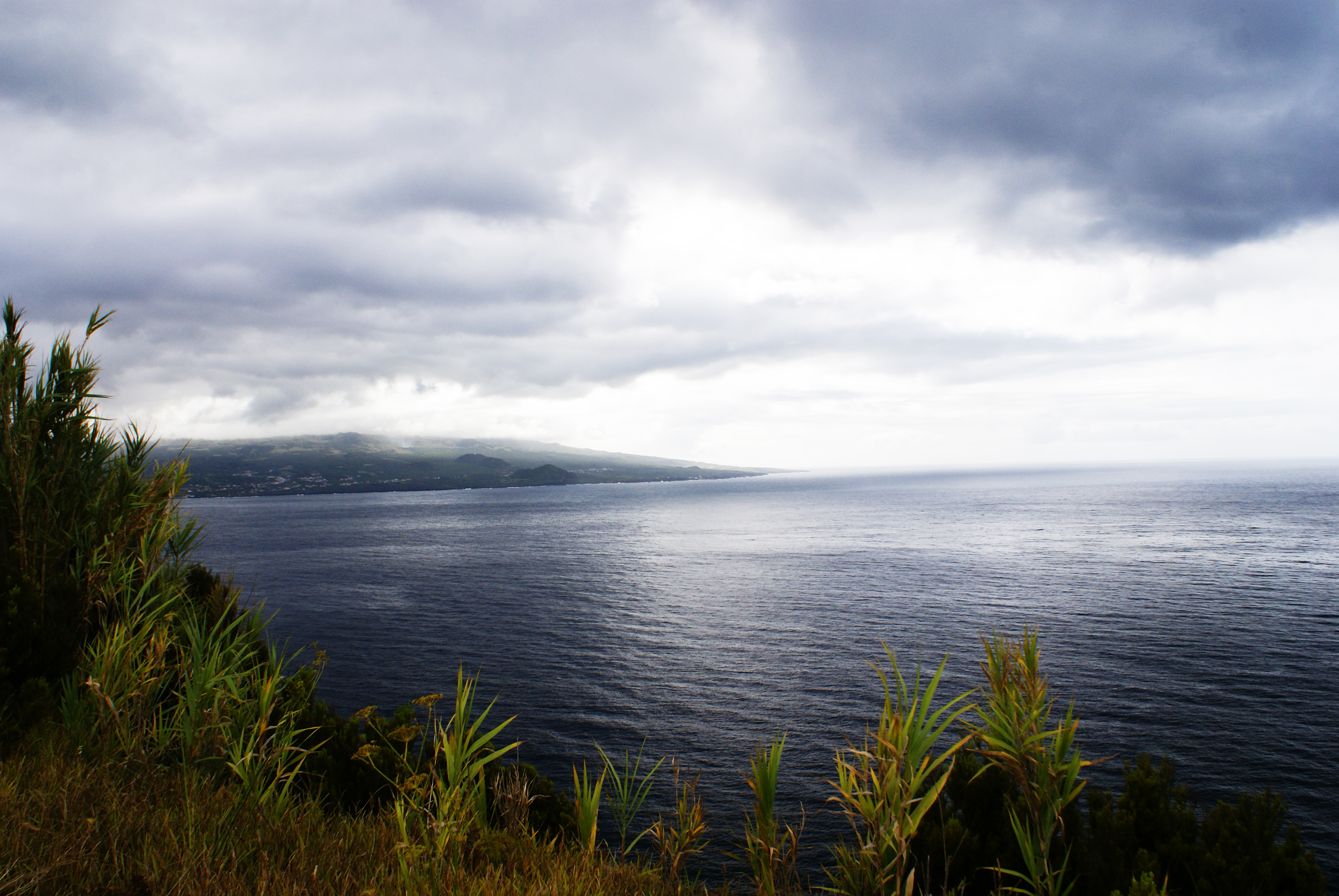
- A view of Monte da Espalamaca, as seen from Pico, showing the Channel dividing the two islands

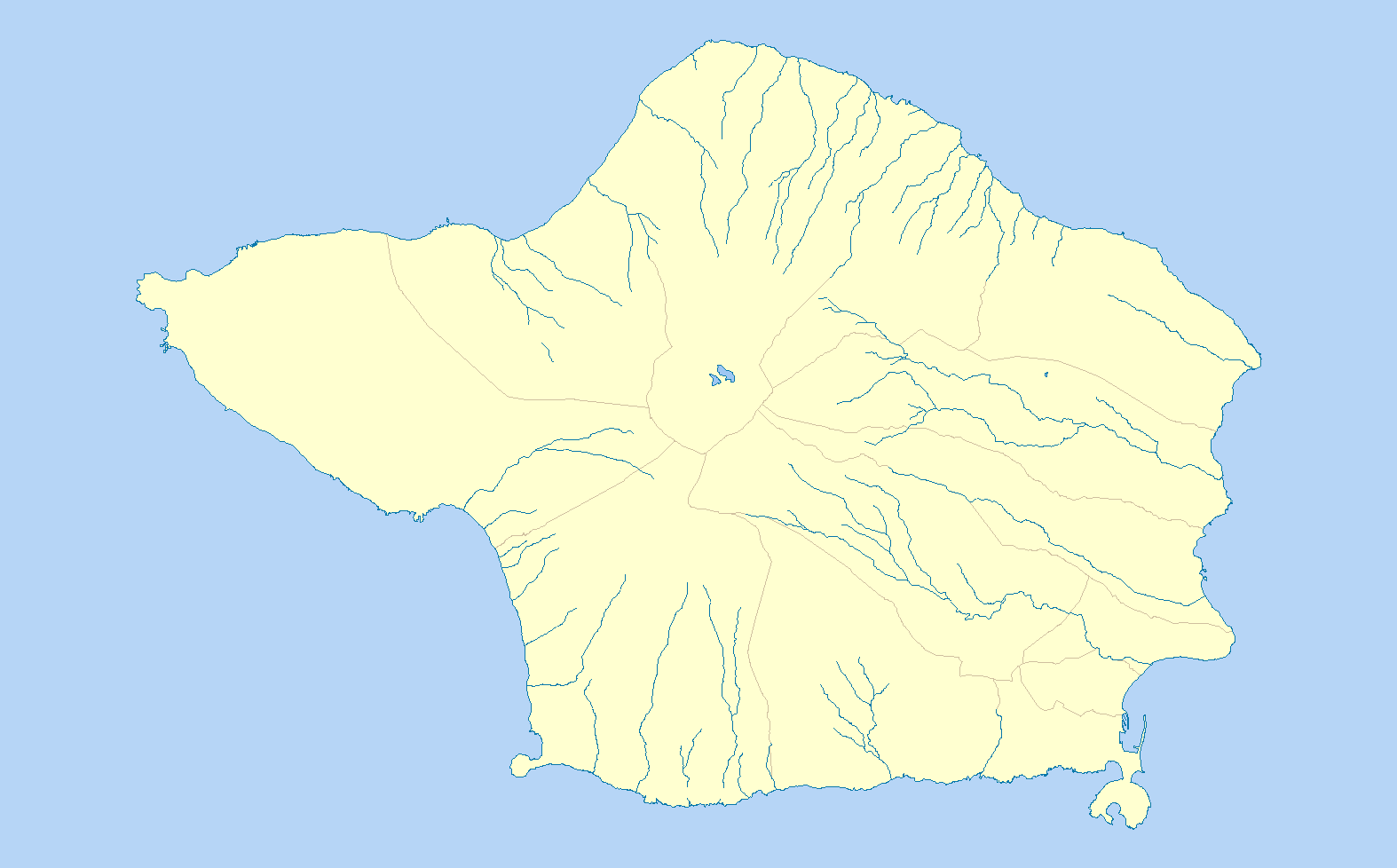
- Location within Faial
- Location: Azores
- Type: Channel
- Basin countries: Portugal

The Faial-Pico Channel (Portuguese: Canal Faial-Pico) is an 8.3 kilometres (5.2 mi) long channel that separates the islands of Faial and Pico in the central group of the archipelago of the Azores. The strait is divided into various depressions, calderas and micro-systems, referred to as Baixas.

== Geography ==
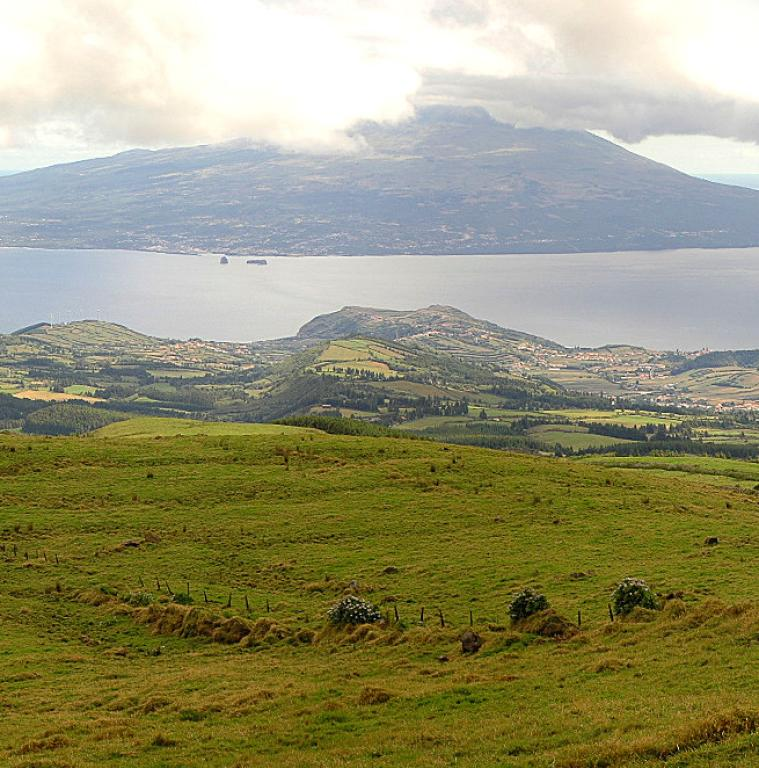
The ubiquitous view of Pico (background) and island of Faial (foreground)

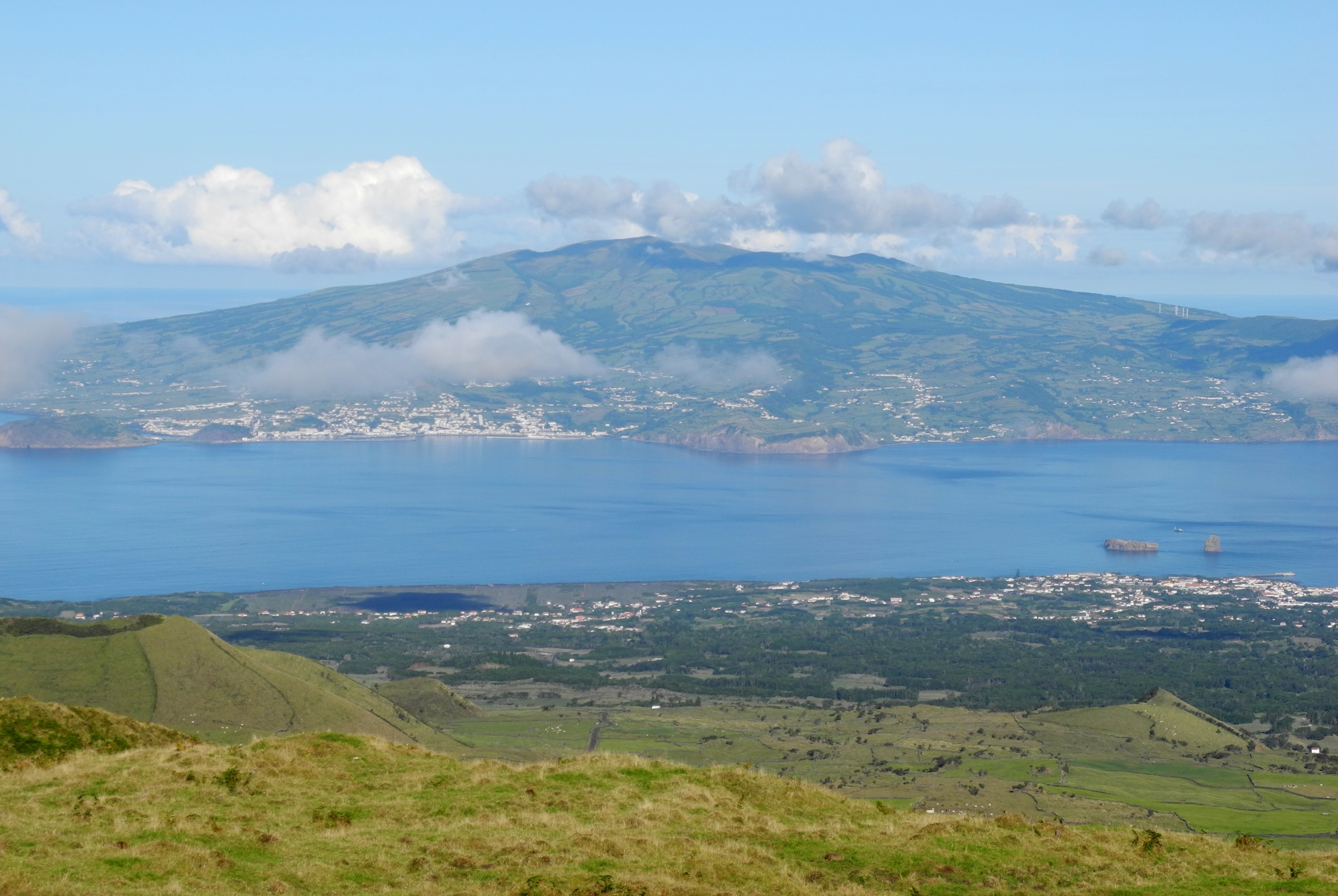
A view of the Faial-Pico Channel, showing the island of Faial in the distance and Pico in the foreground

The Baixa do Norte is located 2 kilometres (1.1 nmi) from Ponta da Espalamaca, at a depth of approximately 100–150 metres (330–490 ft), to a depth reaching 17 metres (56 ft) below sea level. The leading edge of the Baixa do Norte reef includes a series of large rocky outcrops, of less than 5 metres (16 ft) in size. Considered a minor reef, the Baixa do Norte has been used by some fishers, who extended their catches from the Baixa da Barca. The Baixa is characterized by peaks at the 25 metres (82 ft) depth, with large blocks of rock and a fishery of considerable dimension. In comparison, the southern margins is characterized by peaks to about 30 metres (98 ft) consisting of peaks and valleys.

The southern or Baixa do Sul is a meridianal reef situated 2 nautical miles (3.7 km) southeast of the port of Horta. It is located approximately 8 metres (26 ft) below sea level. The entire channel is distinguished by geological structures, including two sub-aquatic caldeiras, between 3–8 metres (9.8–26.2 ft) diameter.

Until about 30 metres (98 ft) below sea level, the area is dominated by extensive uninterrupted boulders, with a terrain that is rugged and divided by metres. Some of these cassums are broken by abrasive calderas, formed from large boulders grinding into the reef floor. These covas de gigante (giants' holes), some 8 metres (26 ft) deep and 3 metres (9.8 ft) diameters that permit movement.

=== Biome ===
The regions gather a variety of organisms, that include small algae and crustaceans to large pelagic species, searching for these large concentration of fish. Due to the importance of these location, various studies by investigators at the regional Department of Oceanography and Fishing (DOP) and University of the Azores (UAç) have delineated these areas by the temporal differences between spring and summer seasons (based on 1997 research), noting a differentiation in marine life during the period, owing to a reduction of anthropological pressures.

The area was designated a ZEC, Zonas Especiais de Conservação (Special Conservation Zone) owing to the important habitats for common terns (Sterna hirundo), loggerhead sea turtle (Caretta caretta) and common bottlenose dolphin (Tursiops truncatus), as well as the Vidália (Azorina vidalii) and Spergularia azorica. The area is marked by two islets situated on the northwest coast of the island of Pico, in front of the seat of Madalena do Pico: the Madalena Islets, also known as the Ilhéu em Pé and Ilhéu Deitado. These islets are the remains of a volcanic cone that has devolved following a submarine and substratus eruption. It is an area of refuge and nesting for marine birds, and encircled by a regular ocean depth of sand and cliff at a maximum of 20 metres (66 ft) depth. At these depths there is a rich diversity of resident species, in addition to pelagic species, and spawning grounds of grey triggerfish.
