= Mosteiro =

Mosteiro, Portuguese for monastery, may refer to the following places in Portugal:

- Mosteiro (Lajes das Flores), a civil parish in the municipality of Lajes das Flores, Azores
- Mosteiró (Santa Maria da Feira), a parish in the municipality of Santa Maria da Feira
- Mosteiro (Oleiros), a civil parish in the municipality of Oleiros
- Mosteiro (Torre de Dona Chama), a village in the parish of Torre de Dona Chama
- Mosteiro (Vieira do Minho), a parish in the municipality of Vieira do Minho
- Mosteiró (Vila do Conde), a parish in the municipality of Vila do Conde

== See also ==
- Mosteiros (disambiguation)
