= MV Cruzeiro do Canal =

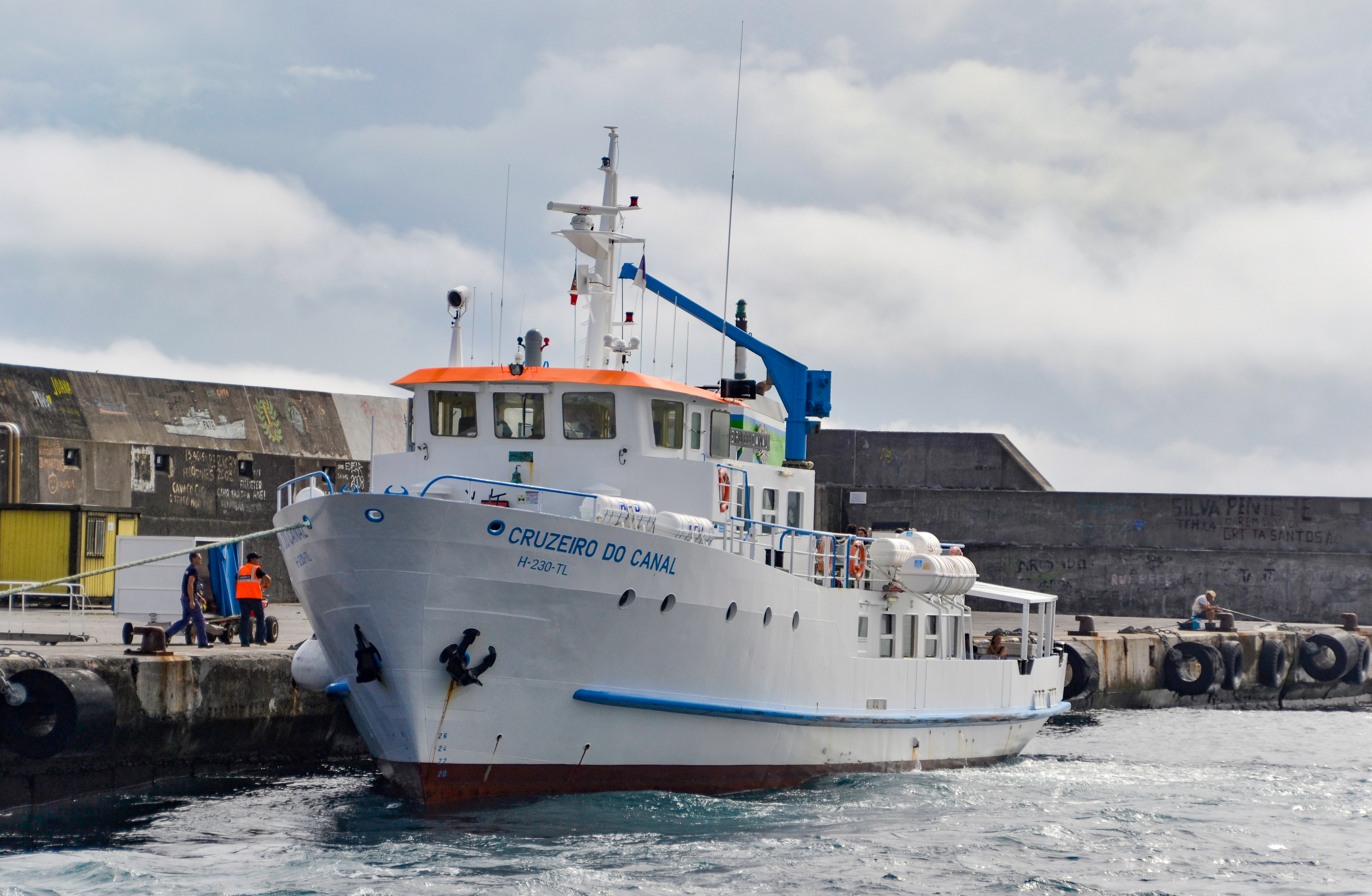
- The bow of the Cruzeiro do Canal at dock in the port of São Roque do Pico

History
- Name: Cruzeiro do Canal
- Owner: Atlânticoline
- Operator: 1986-2013: Transmaçor; 2013–present: Atlânticoline
- Port of registry: Portugal Horta
- Builder: Estaleiros São Jacinto
- Laid down: 1986
- Launched: 7 July 1987
- Christened: 1987
- Completed: 1987
- Acquired: 1986
- Maiden voyage: 1987
- Identification: IMO number: 8419922
- Fate: Standby
- Status: Active

General characteristics
- Tonnage: 227 GT
- Length: 32 m (105 ft)
- Beam: 8 m (26 ft)
- Installed power: 2 Cummins KTA19-M4, 522 KW 2100 rpm
- Speed: 12 knots (22 km/h; 14 mph)
- Capacity: Passengers: 244
- Crew: 5

MV Cruzeiro do Canal is a motor-vessel/ferry that is owned by Atlânticoline (previously operated by Transmaçor), that provided daily or irregular ferry service between the islands of Pico, Faial and/or São Jorge, in the archipelago of the Azores throughout the year.

== History ==
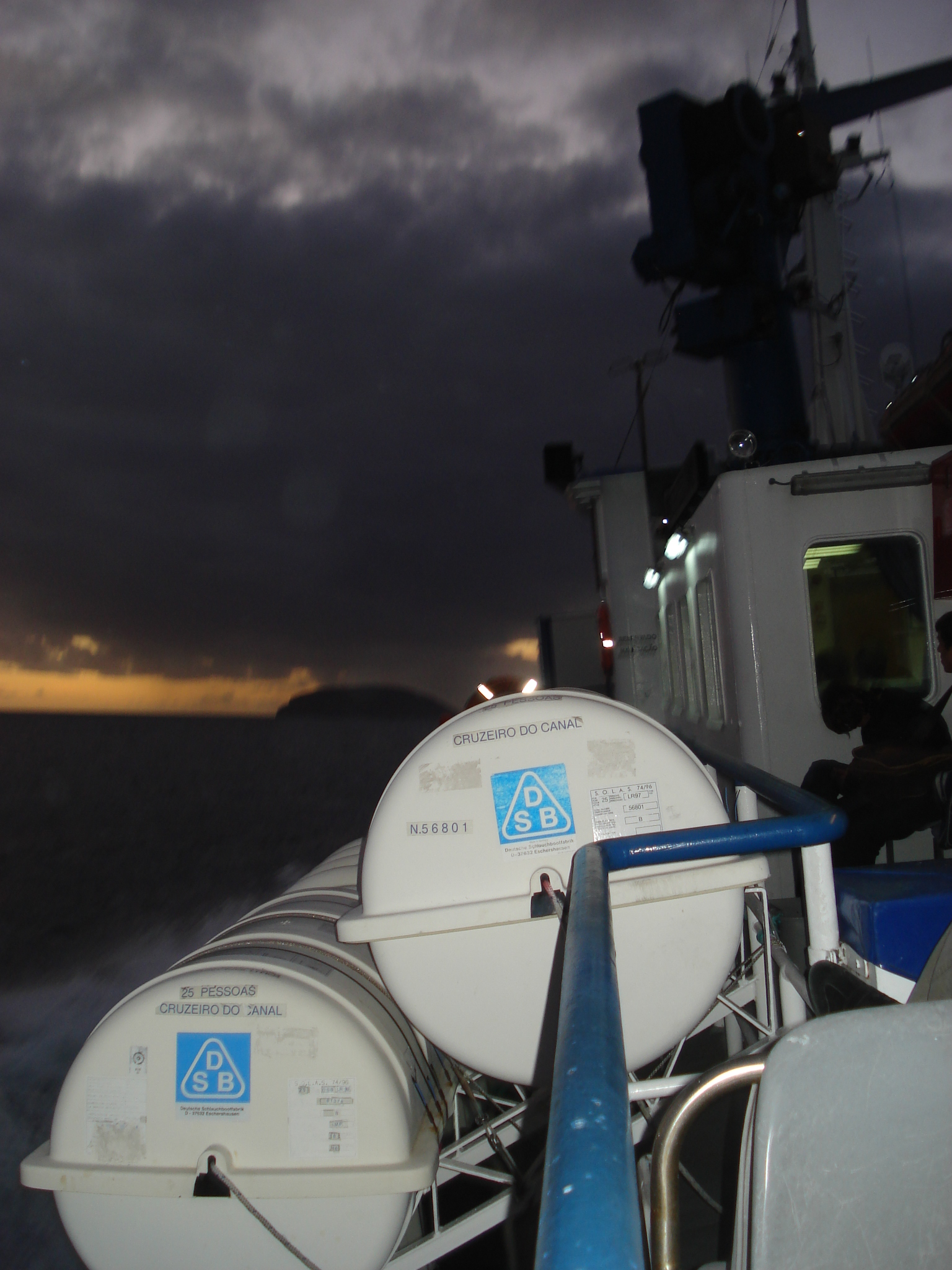
The inter-island Faial-Pico route is the most active in the Azores, no matter the meteorological conditions

The ferry was constructed by Estaleiros São Jacinto, of Aveiro, in 1987, under contract from the Regional Government of the Azores. The ship, and its sister-ship, were constructed to replace the lower-capacity launches used until that time, specifically the motor-launches Espalamaca and Calheta, that were decommissioned and sent to the shipyards of Madalena. Cruzeiro do Canal was originally inaugurated as the Cruzeiro das Ilhas, and entered into service in the waters of the archipelago on 7 July 1987.

In January 1988 it began operating for Transmaçor, in order to service the vital Horta-Madalena, cross-channel route.

=== Later life ===
In June 2006, during his visit to São Jorge, then-Regional Secretary for Economy (Portuguese: Secretário Regional da Economia) Vasco Cordeiro announced that the government of the Azores would invest 40 million Euros for the purchase of ships to enter into service in the archipelago. The government wanted to purchase four ships: two smaller vessels to substitute the aging Cruzeiro das Ilhas and Cruzeiro do Canal; of these one would be permanently docked in Velas (to maintain the São Roque-Horta line) and the other in the port of Horta (to secure the vital Horta-Pico route), both ships would have a 40 metres (130 ft) length and capacity for 300 passengers, in addition to space for 15 vehicles. The two remaining vessels in the tender were larger ferries, to secure the longer, inter-island routes between the islands.

Owing to the age of the Cruzeiro do Canal and her sister-ship and persistent technical and/or mechanical problems, CDS-PP leader Artur Lima addressed parliament, noting:

"...we continue to follow the investments of the Regional Government of hundreds-of-thousands of Euros in successive and unnecessary repairs to the ships Cruzeiro do Canal and Cruzeiro das Ilhas, boats with a long history to tell, but whose thirty years do not guarantee an auspicious future..".

In fact, after three-and-a-half months of repairs, the Cruzeiro do Canal returned to active service in Christmas 2010, after several tests and certification of navigability from IPTM. Until that time, Cruzeiro das Ilhas continued the half-hour trip between Madalena and Horta.

Eventually, Cruzeiro do Canal accompanied the arrival of its replacement ferry Gilberto Mariano from the Port of Madalena, on its arrival in the Central Group on 17 December 2013, at 11:00 a.m. The ship, while still commissioned, is used on intermittent and irregular service, in support of the newer vessels Gilberto Mariano and Mestre Simões.

== See also ==
- Aviation in the Azores
