= Mosteiros Islets =

Islets in the Azores, Portugal

Native name: Ilhéus dos Mosteiros
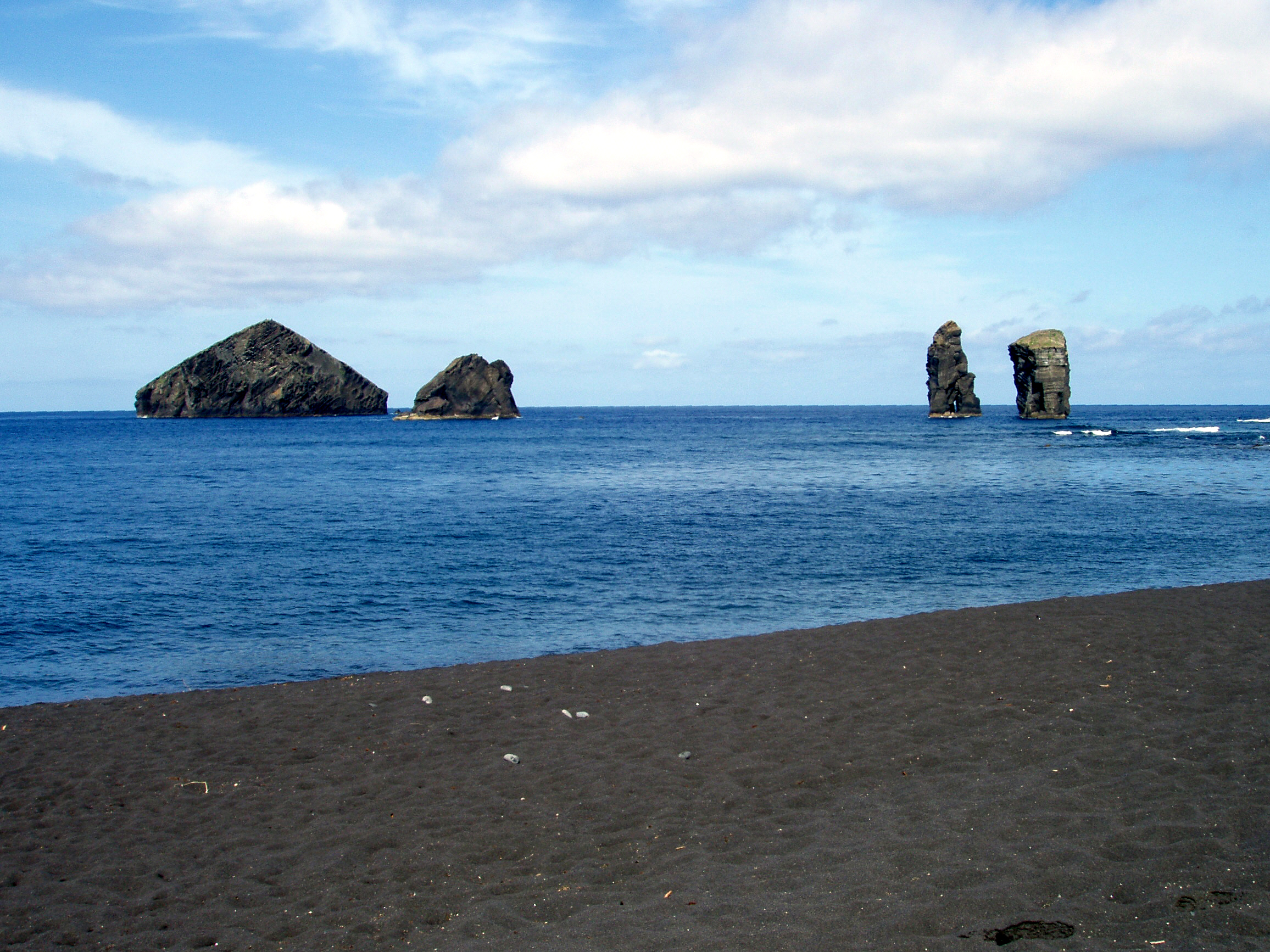
- The Mosteiros Islets seen from the shore

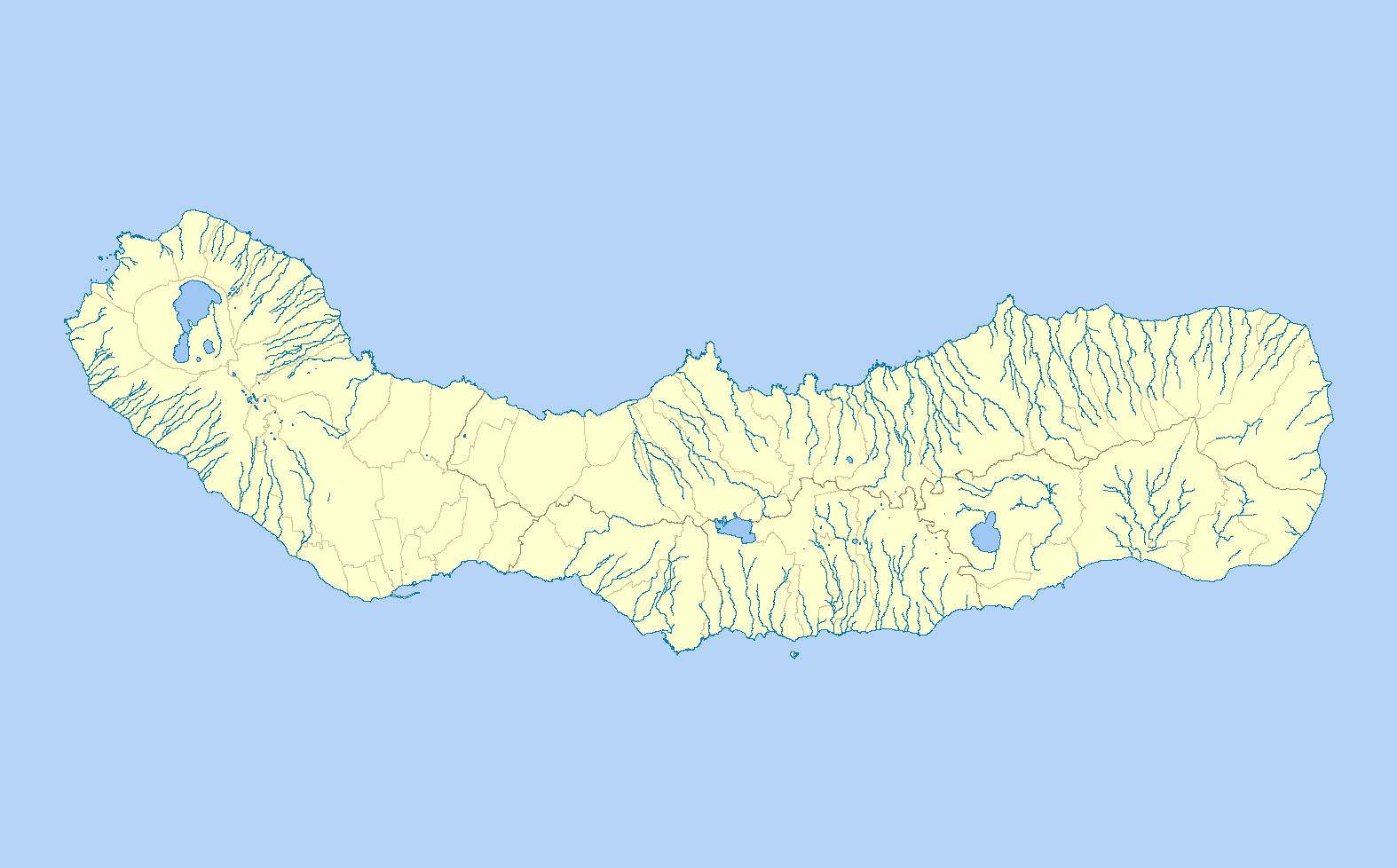
- Location of the islets off the coast of São Miguel
- Etymology: "mosteiros" is Portuguese for "monasteries"

Geography
- Location: Atlantic Ocean
- Coordinates: 37°53′20″N 25°50′04″W

Administration
- Portugal
- Autonomous region: Azores

Demographics
- Population: uninhabited

The Mosteiros Islets (Portuguese: Ilhéus dos Mosteiros; literally, Islets of the Monasteries) are four uninhabited rocky islets located about 0.5 nautical miles (0.93 km; 0.58 mi) from the settlement of Mosteiros, off the extreme northwestern coast of the island of São Miguel in the Portuguese archipelago of the Azores.

== History and etymology ==
The Mosteiros Islets gave the neighboring municipality of Mosteiros its name. According to Azorean chronicler Gaspar Frutuoso, the earliest settlers to the area thought the largest of the islets looked like a church or monastery, and therefore named the islets and their settlement Mosteiros. Frutuoso noted:

"Between the large islet and Ponta Ruiva, by the cliffs, until the promontory of Escalvados, there are some large depressions and well made fumaroles, in the form of a church, or monasteries, or of both things, that older settlers called the monasteries [Mosteiros], situated on the fajã that ran from the peak in Sete Cidades."

== Geography ==
The Mosteiros Islets are the exposed remains of a submarine volcanic cone heavily eroded by the sea over time. The islets are composed of compacted palagonite tuff rock.

The maximum altitude of the islets is 72 metres (236 ft) above sea level. Their picturesque quality makes them a sought-out tourist destination in the Ponta Delgada region.
