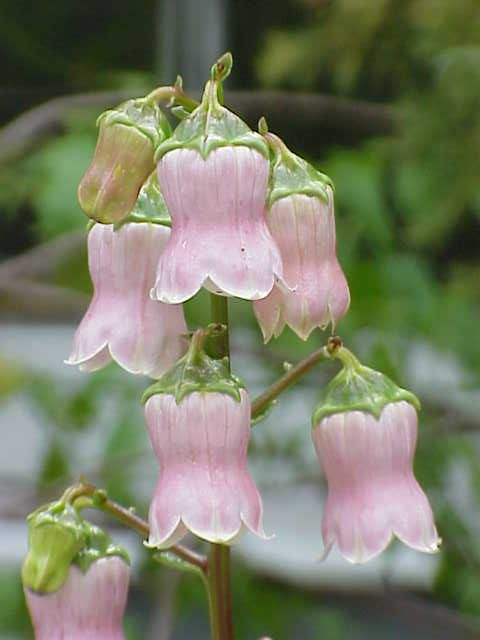

Conservation status
- Endangered (IUCN 3.1)

Scientific classification
- Kingdom: Plantae
- Clade: Tracheophytes
- Clade: Angiosperms
- Clade: Eudicots
- Clade: Asterids
- Order: Asterales
- Family: Campanulaceae
- Subfamily: Campanuloideae
- Genus: Azorina; Feer
- Species: A. vidalii

Binomial name
- Azorina vidalii (H.C.Watson) Feer

= Azorina =

Genus of flowering plants

Azorina is a monotypic genus of flowering plants within the family Campanulaceae, whose sole species, Azorina vidalii, the Azores bellflower, is endemic to the Azores. Its fragmented population is made up of fewer than 1000 mature plants limited to the coastlines of several of the islands. It is also the only species in this family native to the Azores.

== Description ==
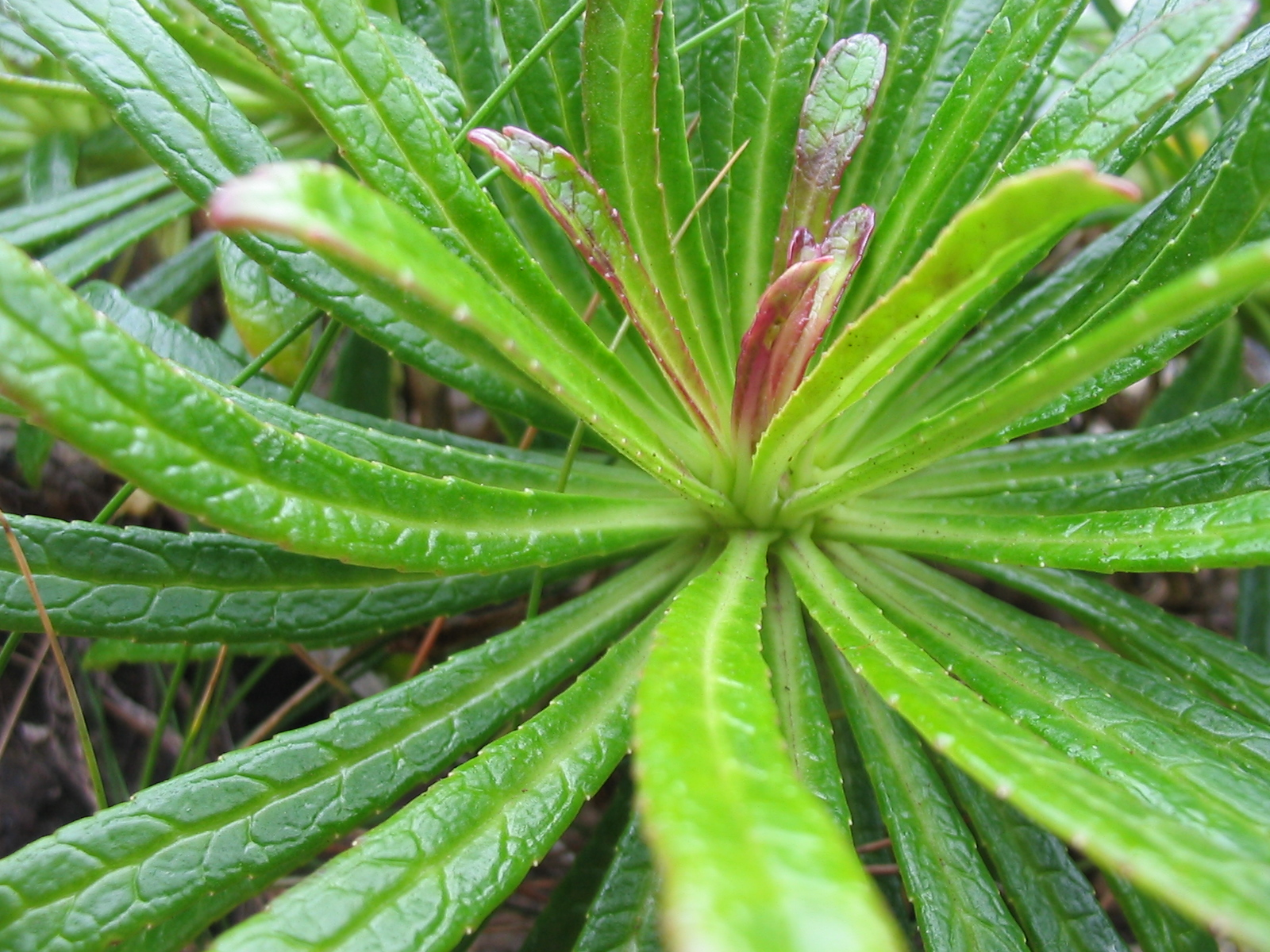
Leaves

Azorina is a small perennial shrub about 30 cm (12 in) tall, but can reach heights of up to 2 m (6 ft 7 in). It has glabrous branches. Leaves are 3–9 cm (1.2–3.5 in) long and 3–9 mm (0.12–0.35 in) wide, glabrous and dark green or reddish-green. The flowers are white or pinkish-pale, up to 3 cm (1.2 in), and bell-shaped. It forms a capsule with numerous seeds.

== Ecology ==
Azorina vidalii is found in all nine islands of the Azores. It grows in association with other species tolerant to the sea breeze, mainly in the crevices of the coastal cliffs, but also in steep slopes with sandy deposits, always in heavily exposed habitats. It also appears in replacement habitats such as roofs and walls. It is planted as an ornamental in some of the native islands and other parts of the world. Its leaves are edible and can be eaten raw.

== History ==
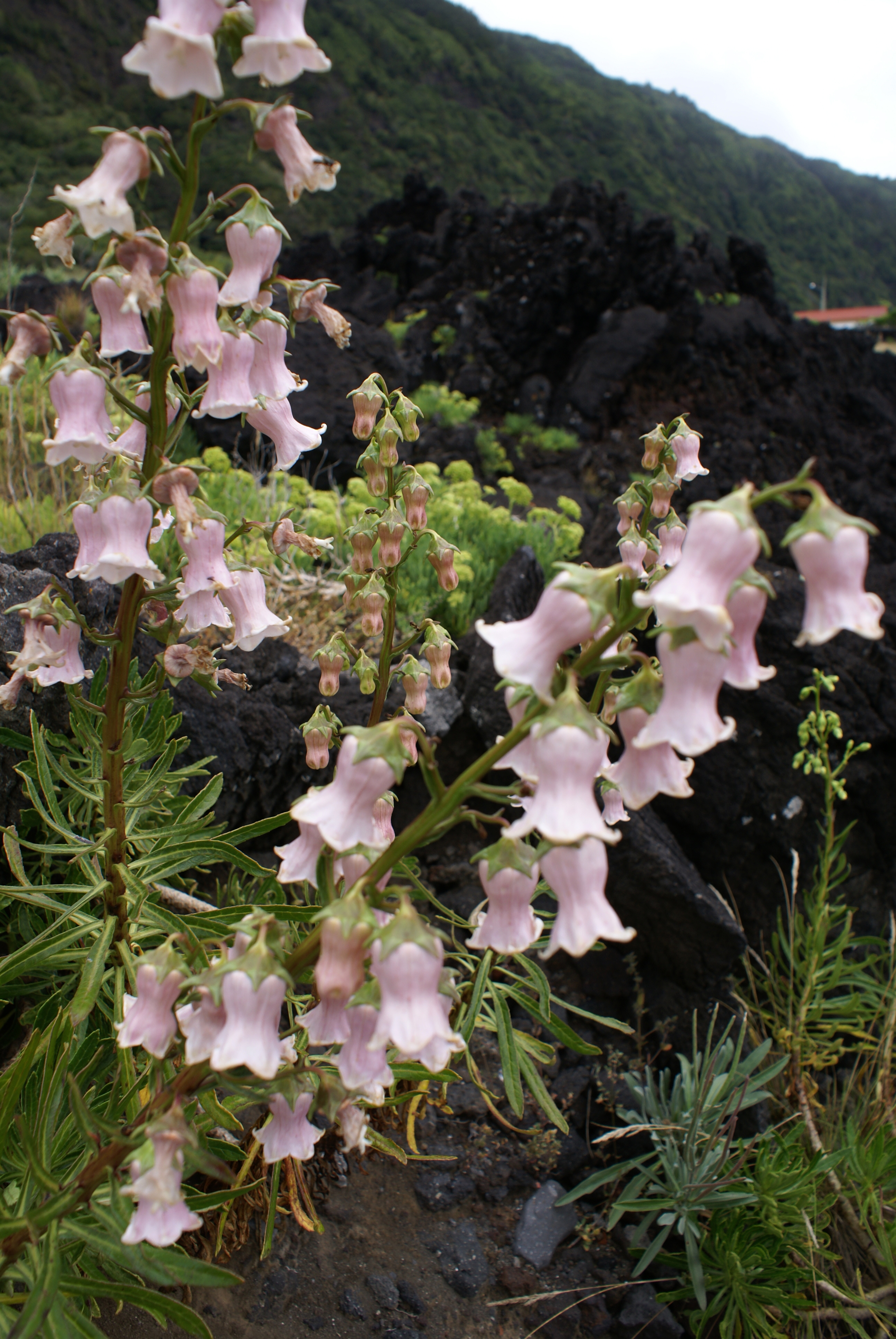
A cluster of Vidalii on the coast of Manadas on the island of São Jorge

It was first harvested by Watson, along the coast of Santa Cruz on the Azorean island of Flores, during his botanical expedition in 1843. It was initially designated Campanula vidalii by Watson and published in 1844.

Its ecology has been presented in an inconsistent manner; it has been referred to as adapting to cracks in the sea cliffs, or to deposits, and in abrupt and sandy slopes.

Azorina vidalii was protected by the Bern Convention in 1992 (Annex I) and by the Habitats Directive 140/99 (Diário da República, Anexo 2B), where it was considered a priority species in critical risk; it is an endangered species due to habitat degradation by invasive species, pollution, and development.

It diverged from its ancestral descendants around 8.3±1.7 million years ago, associated with its first island of colonization, Santa Maria (Olesen et al., 2012), which formed 8-10 million years ago (Serralheiro & Madeira, 1993). Carine et al. (2004) and Fernández-Palacios et al. (2011) also refer to the existence of submarine mounts, formerly immersed, that functioned as stepping-stones from the continent. At the same time, Azorina vidalii is not vulnerable to the rise in temperature and prefers the zones along the coast to propagate.
