= Topo Islet =

Islet in the Azores, Portugal

Native name: Ilhéu do Topo
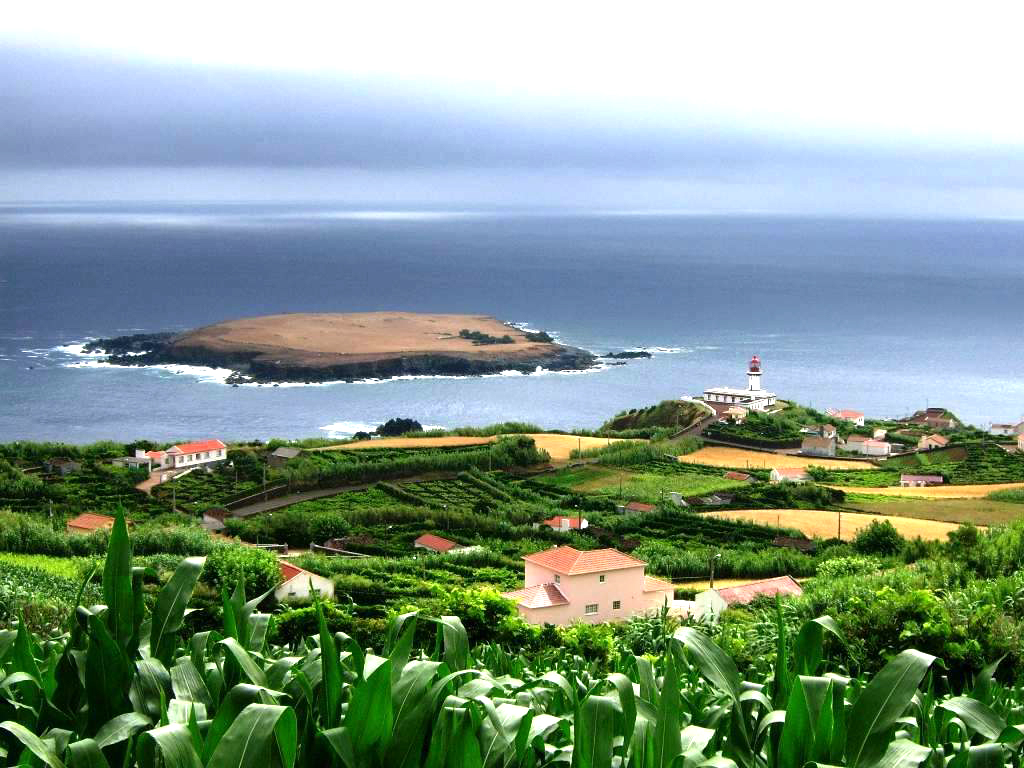
- The islet seen from São Jorge

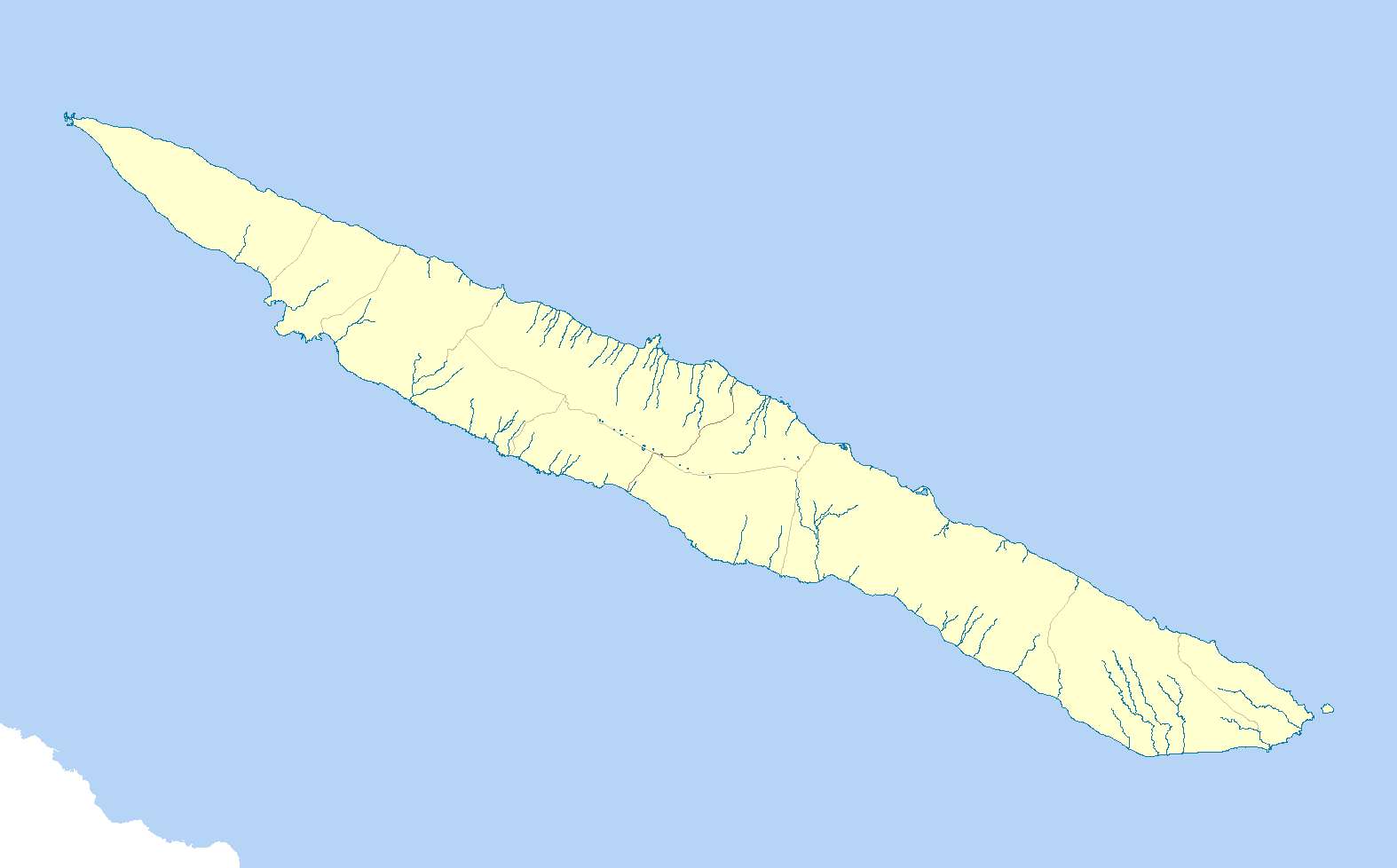
- Location of the islet off the coast of São Jorge

Geography
- Location: Atlantic Ocean
- Coordinates: 38°33′03″N 27°44′48″W
- Area: 0.1214 km^{2} (0.0469 sq mi)

Administration
- Portugal
- Autonomous region: Azores

Demographics
- Population: uninhabited

Topo Islet (Portuguese: Ilhéu do Topo) is a vegetated uninhabited islet just off the extreme southeastern tip of the island of São Jorge in the Portuguese archipelago of the Azores.

== Geography ==
Topo Islet is approximately 12.14 hectares (30.0 acres; 0.0469 sq mi) in area. It is about 100 metres (330 ft) off the southeasternmost tip of São Jorge, adjacent the civil parish of Topo in the Calheta municipality.

Waters around the islet range from 5 to 22 metres (16 to 72 ft) deep. The area is suitable for more experienced divers due to strong currents. Though the islet is just off the coast, most diving expeditions leave from the port of Velas, about 75 minutes away by boat.

The islet has no permanent human population or structures. However, prior to Topo Islet's local protection as a nature reserve, people visited the islet and its waters to camp and spearfish.

=== Biome ===
The islet serves as a marine bird sanctuary. Marine birds inhabiting or visiting the islet include black-headed gull, common tern, Cory's shearwater, Eurasian whimbrel, great black-backed gull, little egret, little shearwater, roseate tern, ruddy turnstone, and sanderling. In recognition of the islet's role as a marine bird habitat, in 1984 the regional Legislative Assembly of the Azores decreed the islet a "partial" nature reserve. Since March 1990 the islet and adjacent coastline on the main island of São Jorge have been protected through the European Environment Agency's Natura 2000 initiative under the Birds Directive.

In 2011 the original Topo Islet reserve and adjacent coastline was named Área Protegida para a Gestão de Habitats ou Espécies do Ilhéu do Topo (Topo Islet Protected Area for Habitat and Species Restoration) and integrated into the newly established Nature Park of São Jorge, one of the locally protected areas of the Azores. The entire terrestrial area of the islet is protected.

As sheep and cattle pasture on the islet—damaging the natural habitat—its plant diversity is low. However, researchers have found exemplars of the endemic Azorean bracel-da-rocha fescue grass (Festuca petraea) on Topo Islet.

The waters around Topo Islet are biodiverse. Fish observed in the area include Atlantic bonito, Azores chromis, barred hogfish, bluefish, Canary damsel, dusky grouper, longfin yellowtail, Mediterranean rainbow wrasse, moray eels of various species, ornate wrasse, white trevally, and yellowmouth barracuda. The common octopus also habitates the area.
